= Jean Arthur filmography =

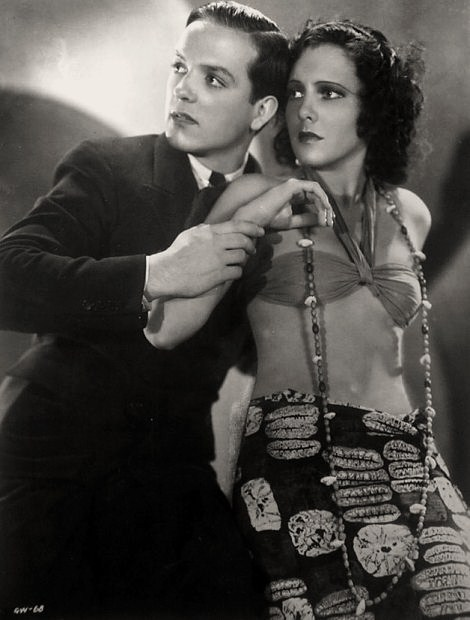
Eric Linden and Jean Arthur in The Past of Mary Holmes (1933)

This is the filmography of Jean Arthur (October 17, 1900 – June 19, 1991), including her television work.

== Film ==
Year	Title	Role	Notes
1923	Cameo Kirby	Ann Playdell	
1923	Somebody Lied		Short subject
1923	Spring Fever		Short subject
1924	Case Dismissed		Short subject
1924	The Powerful Eye		Short subject
1924	Wine of Youth	Automobile Reveler	Uncredited role
1924	The Iron Horse	Reporter	Uncredited role
1924	Fast and Fearless	Mary Brown	Incomplete
1924	Biff Bang Buddy	Bonnie Norton	
1924	Bringin' Home the Bacon	Nancy Norton	
1924	Thundering Romance	Mary Watkins	
1924	Travelin' Fast	Betty Conway	
1925	Seven Chances	Receptionist "Miss Smith" at country club	Uncredited role
1925	The Drug Store Cowboy	Jean	
1925	The Fighting Smile	Rose Craddock	
1925	Tearin' Loose	Sally Harris	
1925	A Man of Nerve	Loria Gatlin	
1925	The Hurricane Horseman	June Mathews	
1925	Thundering Through	Ruth Burroughs	
1926	Under Fire	Margaret Cranston	
1926	The Roaring Rider	Mary Watkins	as Miss Jean Arthur
1926	Born to Battle	Eunice Morgan	
1926	The Fighting Cheat	Ruth Wells	
1926	Eight-Cylinder Bull		Short subject
1926	The Mad Racer		Short subject
1926	Double Daring	Marie Wells	
1926	Lightning Bill	Marie Denton	
1926	Twisted Triggers	Ruth Regan	
1926	The Cowboy Cop	Virginia Selby	
1926	The College Boob	Angela Boothby	
1926	The Block Signal	Grace Ryan	
1927	Winners of the Wilderness	Bit Role	Uncredited role
1927	Husband Hunters	Lettie Crane	
1927	Hello Lafayette		Short subject
1927	The Broken Gate	Ruth Hale	Lost film
1927	Horse Shoes	Miss Baker	
1927	Bigger and Better Blondes		Short subject
1927	The Poor Nut	Margie Blake	
1927	The Masked Menace	Faith	Lost film
1927	Flying Luck	The Girl	
1928	Wallflowers	Sandra	
1928	Easy Come, Easy Go		Lost film
1928	Warming Up	Mary Post	First sound feature for Paramount Pictures; Lost film
1928	Brotherly Love	Mary	
1928	Sins of the Fathers	Mary Spengler	
1929	The Canary Murder Case	Alice LaFosse	
1929	Stairs of Sand	Ruth Hutt	
1929	The Mysterious Dr. Fu Manchu	Lia Eltham	
1929	The Greene Murder Case	Ada Greene	
1929	The Saturday Night Kid	Janie	Alternative title: Love 'Em and Leave 'Em
1929	Half Way to Heaven	Greta Nelson	
1930	Street of Chance	Judith Marsden	
1930	Young Eagles	Mary Gordon	
1930	Paramount on Parade	Sweetheart (Dream Girl/In a Hospital)	
1930	The Return of Dr. Fu Manchu	Lia Eltham	
1930	Danger Lights	Mary Ryan	
1930	The Silver Horde	Mildred Wayland	
1931	The Gang Buster	Sylvia Martine	
1931	The Virtuous Husband	Barbara Olwell	
1931	The Lawyer's Secret	Beatrice Stevens	
1931	Ex-Bad Boy	Ethel Simmons	
1933	The Past of Mary Holmes	Joan Hoyt	
1933	Get That Venus	Margaret Rendleby	
1934	Whirlpool	Sandra Morrison	
1934	The Most Precious Thing in Life	Ellen Holmes, aka Biddy, Babe	
1934	The Defense Rests	Joan Hayes	
1935	The Whole Town's Talking	Wilhelmina Clark	Alternative title: Passport to Fame
1935	Party Wire	Marge Oliver	
1935	Public Hero No. 1	Maria Theresa "Terry" O'Reilly	
1935	Diamond Jim	Jane Matthews/Emma	
1935	The Public Menace	Cassie Nicholls	
1935	If You Could Only Cook	Joan Hawthorne	
1936	Mr. Deeds Goes to Town	Louise "Babe" Bennett/Mary Dawson	
1936	The Ex-Mrs. Bradford	Paula Bradford	
1936	Adventure in Manhattan	Claire Peyton	Alternative title: Manhattan Madness
1936	The Plainsman	Calamity Jane	
1936	More Than a Secretary	Carol Baldwin	
1937	History Is Made at Night	Irene Vail	
1937	Easy Living	Mary Smith	
1938	You Can't Take It with You	Alice Sycamore	
1939	Only Angels Have Wings	Bonnie Lee	
1939	Mr. Smith Goes to Washington	Clarissa Saunders	
1940	Too Many Husbands	Vicky Lowndes	Alternative title: My Two Husbands
1940	Arizona	Phoebe Titus	
1941	The Devil and Miss Jones	Mary Jones	
1942	The Talk of the Town	Miss Nora Shelley	
1943	The More the Merrier	Constance "Connie" Milligan	Nominated—Academy Award for Best Actress
1943	A Lady Takes a Chance	Molly J. Truesdale	Alternative title: The Cowboy and the Girl
1944	The Impatient Years	Janie Anderson	
1948	A Foreign Affair	Congresswoman Phoebe Frost	
1953	Shane	Marian Starrett	

== Television ==
Year	Title	Role	Notes
1965	Gunsmoke	Julie Blane	1 episode
1966	The Jean Arthur Show	Patricia Marshall	11 episodes
