= Trailin' Back =

1928 film directed by J.P. McGowan

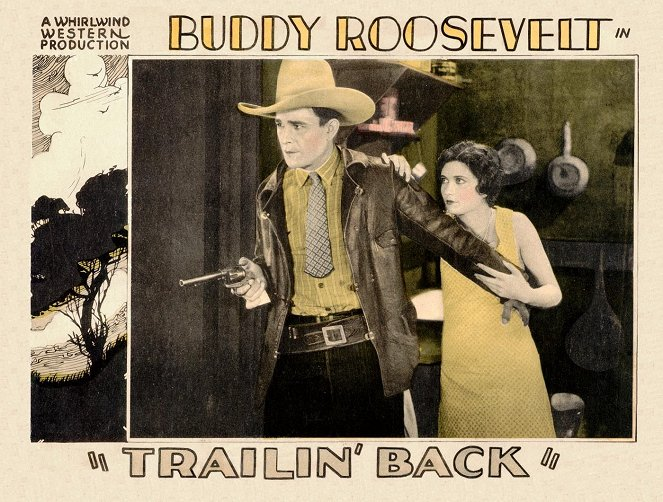
- Directed by: J.P. McGowan
- Written by: Victor Rousseau; J.P. McGowan; Arthur Hoerl
- Produced by: Trem Carr
- Starring: Buddy Roosevelt; Lafe McKee; Leon De La Mothe
- Cinematography: Mack V. Wright
- Edited by: Robert E. Cline
- Production company: Trem Carr Pictures
- Distributed by: Rayart Pictures
- Release date: March 1928
- Running time: 50 minutes
- Country: United States
- Languages: Silent; English intertitles

Trailin' Back is a 1928 American silent Western film directed by J.P. McGowan and starring Buddy Roosevelt, Lafe McKee and Leon De La Mothe.

== Cast ==
- Buddy Roosevelt
- Betty Baker
- Lafe McKee
- Leon De La Mothe
- Tom Bay
- Bert Sanderson
- Al Bertram

== Bibliography ==
- Munden, Kenneth White. The American Film Institute Catalog of Motion Pictures Produced in the United States, Part 1. University of California Press, 1997.
