= The Galloping Gobs =

1927 film

- Directed by: Richard Thorpe
- Written by: Lewis D. Collins; Sergey Sergeyeff; Richard Thorpe
- Produced by: Lester F. Scott Jr.
- Starring: Jay Wilsey; Morgan Brown; Betty Baker
- Cinematography: Ray Ries
- Production company: Action Pictures
- Distributed by: Pathé Exchange
- Release date: February 27, 1927
- Running time: 50 minutes
- Country: United States
- Languages: Silent; English intertitles

The Galloping Gobs is a 1927 American silent Western film directed by Richard Thorpe and starring Jay Wilsey, Morgan Brown and Betty Baker.

== Cast ==
- Jay Wilsey as Bill Corbitt
- Morgan Brown as Chub Barnes
- Betty Baker as Mary Whipple
- Raye Hampton as Fanny
- Walter Maly as The bandit leader
- Robert Homans as The banker
- Jack Barnell as The ensign
- Fred Burns as The sheriff
