= Jay Wilsey =

American actor

- Wilsey in Texas Terror, 1935
- Born: February 6, 1896; St. Francisville, Missouri, U.S.
- Died: October 25, 1961 (aged 65); Los Angeles, California, U.S.
- Occupation: Actor
- Years active: 1924–1944
- Spouse: Jeanette Boutelle (1933–1961) (his death)

Jay Wilsey (February 6, 1896 – October 25, 1961) was an American film actor (born Wilbert Jay Wilsey). He appeared in nearly 100 films between 1924 and 1944. He starred in a series of very low-budget westerns in the 1920s and 1930s, billed as Buffalo Bill Jr.

== Biography ==
Born in St. Francisville, Missouri (studio biographies claimed Cheyenne, Wyoming), the six-foot one-inch, brown-haired, blue-eyed Wilsey rode in Wild West shows and rodeos before he became an actor. Producer Lester F. Scott Jr., who specialized in making low-budget silent westerns, signed Wilsey to a movie contract and billed him as "Buffalo Bill, Jr." One of his early credits, Thundering Romance (1924), cast Wilsey as "Lightning Bill", opposite novice film player and future star Jean Arthur.

Universal Pictures tried to build Jay Wilsey as an action star under his real name (a 1929 trade review lists him as "formerly Buffalo Bill, Jr."), but his two starring roles in the serials A Final Reckoning (1928) and The Pirate of Panama (1929) did not lead to more assignments, as the studio was converting to the production of sound films.

Wilsey's career as an actor diminished as sound films increased in popularity, although he continued to find work with independent producers. Victor Adamson, whose westerns were so threadbare that he shot them in ramshackle California ghost towns on budgets of $1,000 or less, hired Wilsey for a series of features under the auspices of Adamson's ambitiously named Superior Talking Pictures. One of these has become notorious among bad-film enthusiasts: a 1934 production was announced as Lightning Bill, but the film title was clumsily misspelled as "Lighting Bill", and the cheapskate producer didn't bother changing the title. Adamson did give Wilsey a chance to direct as well as star in Riding Speed (1934); Wilsey receives performer credit as Buffalo Bill, Jr. and director credit as Jay Wilsey.

The Adamson features were Wilsey's last starring series. Producer Paul Malvern then signed him to appear in his John Wayne westerns. Thereafter Wilsey found work in western features and serials as a supporting player, often uncredited, and his riding skills gave him credentials as a stunt performer. A January 29, 1940, newspaper article reported that he had performed 6,000 stunts up to that time.

Wilsey was married to actress Jeanette Boutelle.

== Selected filmography ==
- Rarin' to Go (1924) - Bill Dillon
- Fast and Fearless (1924) - Lightning Bill Lewis
- Hard Hittin' Hamilton (1924) - Bill Hamilton
- Bringin' Home the Bacon (1924) - Bill Winton
- Thundering Romance (1924) - Lightning Bill
- Full Speed (1925)
- On the Go (1925) - Bill Drake
- Double Action Daniels (1925) - Double Action Daniels
- Quicker'n Lightnin' (1925) - Quicker'n Lightnin'
- The Desert Demon (1925) - Bill Davis
- The Saddle Cyclone (1925) - Bill Demming
- A Streak of Luck (1925) - Billy Burton
- The Roaring Rider (1926) - Buffalo Bill Jr.
- Hoodoo Ranch (1926)
- Trumpin' Trouble (1926) - Bill Lawson
- Coming an' Going (1926) - Bill Martin
- Deuce High (1926) - Ted Crawford
- Rawhide (1926) - Rawhide Rawlins
- Speedy Spurs (1926) - Bill Clark
- The Bonanza Buckaroo (1926) - Bill Merritt
- Bad Man's Bluff (1926) - Zane Castleton
- The Galloping Gobs (1927) - Bill Corbitt
- The Ridin' Rowdy (1927) - Bill Gibson
- Pals in Peril (1927) - Bill Gordon
- The Interferin' Gent (1927) - Bill Stannard
- The Obligin' Buckaroo (1927) - Bill Murray
- Roarin' Broncs (1927) - Bill Morris
- The Ballyhoo Buster (1928) - Bob Warner
- The Valley of Hunted Men (1928) - Tom Mallory
- A Final Reckoning (1928) - Captain Wilson
- The Pirate of Panama (1929) - Karl
- Thundering Thompson (1929) - Cowhand (uncredited)
- Bar-L Ranch (1930) - Bob Tyler
- Beyond the Rio Grande (1930) - Bill
- The Cheyenne Kid (1930) - Buck Allen / The Cheyenne Kid
- Way Out West (1930) - Hank
- Beyond the Law (1930) - Henchman (uncredited)
- The Utah Kid (1930) - Deputy (uncredited)
- South of Sonora (1930) - Bill Tracy
- Westward Bound (1930) - Bob Lansing
- Trails of the Golden West (1931)
- The Mystery Trooper (1931) - Tall Henchman (uncredited)
- Pueblo Terror (1931) - Bill Sommers
- A Holy Terror (1931) - Cowboy (uncredited)
- Riders of the Golden Gulch (1932)
- Ridin' for Justice (1932) - Barfly (uncredited)
- The Texan (1932) - Bill Rust
- Dynamite Denny (1932) - 'Dynamite' Denny
- Hidden Gold (1932) - Cowhand (uncredited)
- The Lost Special (1932, Serial) - Forest Station Agent [Ch. 2] (uncredited)
- Terror Trail (1933) - Prisoner (uncredited)
- The Thrill Hunter (1933) - Pilot (uncredited)
- The Fighting Cowboy (1933) - Bill Carson
- Deadwood Pass (1933) - Deputy
- Rusty Rides Alone (1933) - Luke Quillan (uncredited)
- Strange People (1933) - Traveller (uncredited)
- Trails of Adventure (1933) - Bill Merritt
- The Whirlwind Rider (1934) - Bill Reed
- Lighting Bill (1934) - Bill
- Wheels of Destiny (1934) - Bill Collins
- Adventures of Texas Jack (1934) - Bill Mayberry
- Riding Speed (1934) - Buck Cartwright
- The Lawless Frontier (1934) - 2nd Zanti Henchman
- 'Neath the Arizona Skies (1934) - Jim Moore
- Texas Terror (1935) - Blackie Martin
- The Phantom Empire (1935, Serial) - Thunder Guard (uncredited)
- Five Bad Men (1935) - Bad Man #1
- Rainbow Valley (1935) - Butch Galt
- Princess O'Hara (1935) - Mounted Policeman (uncredited)
- The Miracle Rider (1935, Serial) - Daniel Boone [Ch. 1] / Henchman [Ch. 11] (uncredited)
- The Roaring West (1935, Serial) - Cowhand Slim (uncredited)
- Powdersmoke Range (1935) - Tex Malcolm
- Three Kids and a Queen (1935) - Cop (uncredited)
- The Fire-Trap (1935) - Henchman (uncredited)
- Red River Valley (1936) - Construction Worker (uncredited)
- Heroes of the Range (1936) - Deputy (uncredited)
- Avenging Waters (1936) - Fence Foreman (uncredited)
- The Phantom Rider (1936, Serial) - Deputy Tom (Ch's 6, 8) (uncredited)
- Oh, Susanna! (1936) - Sage City Deputy (uncredited)
- Rio Grande Ranger (1936) - Texas Ranger (uncredited)
- Ranger Courage (1937) - Ranger Lieutenant Caps
- Way Out West (1937) - Barfly (uncredited)
- Law of the Ranger (1937) - Ranger Lieutenant Wells (uncredited)
- Forlorn River (1937) - Blaine Cowhand (uncredited)
- Wild West Days (1937, Serial) - Henchman / Ranch Hand / Townsman (uncredited)
- The Rangers Step In (1937) - Texas Ranger Capt. Thomas
- Rough Riders' Round-up (1939) - Barfly (uncredited)
- Blue Montana Skies (1939) - Mallew (uncredited)
- Pioneers of the Frontier (1940) - Henchman (uncredited)
- The Lone Rider Rides On (1941) - Henchman Bart
- The Lone Rider Crosses the Rio (1941) - Henchman Bart
- The Lone Rider in Ghost Town (1941) - Cowboy (uncredited)
- Lawless Plainsmen (1942) - Slim - Cowhand (uncredited)
- Frontier Fury (1943) - Stagecoach Shotgun (uncredited)
- The Dancing Masters (1943) - Stage Driver (uncredited)
- The Last Horseman (1944) - Henchman (uncredited)
- Big Jim McLain (1952) - Mr. Whalen (uncredited)
