= Full Speed =

Full Speed may refer to:

- Full Speed (1925 film), silent film western
- Full Speed (1934 film), Italian comedy film
- Full Speed (1996 film), French film
- Full Speed (album), the album by Kid Ink
- Full speed or flank speed, a nautical term referring to a ship's true maximum speed
