= Trail Riders (1928 film) =

1928 film directed by J.P. McGowan

- Directed by: J.P. McGowan
- Written by: Milton Angle; J.P. McGowan
- Produced by: Trem Carr
- Starring: Buddy Roosevelt; Lafe McKee; Betty Baker
- Cinematography: Mack V. Wright
- Edited by: Robert E. Cline
- Production company: Trem Carr Pictures
- Distributed by: Rayart Pictures
- Release date: April 1928
- Running time: 50 minutes
- Country: United States
- Languages: Silent; English intertitles

Trail Riders is a 1928 American silent Western film directed by J.P. McGowan and starring Buddy Roosevelt, Lafe McKee, and Betty Baker.

== Cast ==
- Buddy Roosevelt
- Lafe McKee
- Betty Baker
- Gilbert Holmes
- Paul Malvern
- Leon De La Mothe
- Tom Bay

== Bibliography ==
- John J. McGowan. J.P. McGowan: Biography of a Hollywood Pioneer. McFarland, 2005.
