= Harry Todd =

American actor (1863–1935)

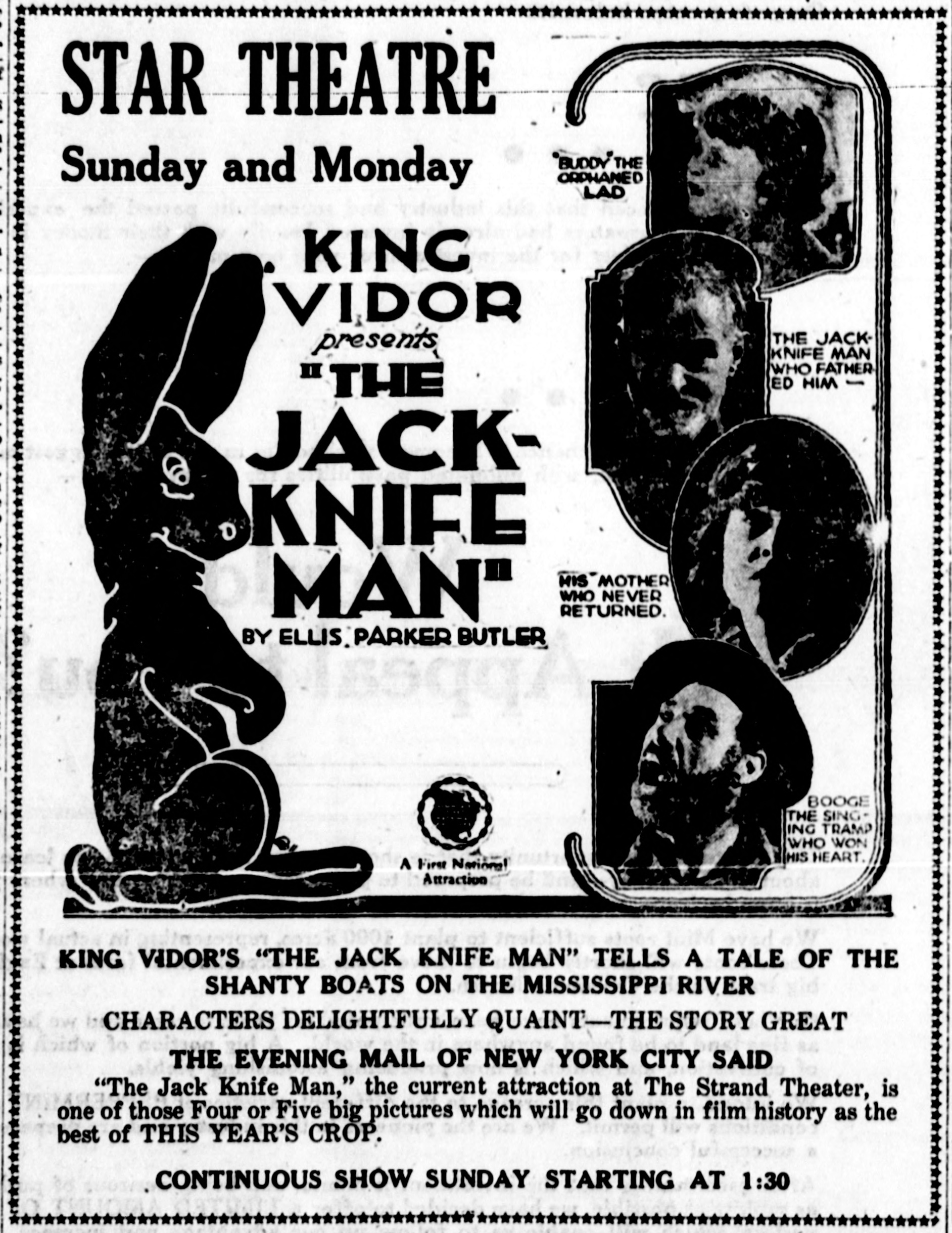
- Ad for The Jack-Knife Man (1920) with Harry Todd as "Booge" (lower right)
- Born: John Nelson Todd; December 13, 1863; Allegheny, Pennsylvania, U.S.
- Died: February 15, 1935 (aged 71); Glendale, California, U.S.
- Resting place: Grand View Memorial Park Cemetery
- Other name: William Todd
- Years active: 1909-1935
- Spouse: Margaret Joslin
- Children: 1

Harry Todd (born John Nelson Todd; December 13, 1863 – February 15, 1935) was an American actor.

== Early life and career ==
A native of Allegheny, Pennsylvania, Todd was one of at least five siblings, including one described by The Pittsburgh Press in 1895 as "poet-actor William E. Todd."

== Death ==
Todd died in Glendale, California, from a heart attack at the age of 71, survived by his wife, actress Margaret Joslin, and their daughter; his cremated remains are interred at Grand View Memorial Park Cemetery.

== Selected filmography ==
- Ben's Kid (1909, Short)
- Across the Plains (1911, Short)
- Alkali Ike's Auto (1911, Short) - Mustang Pete
- The Infant at Snakeville (1911)
- Luke Pipes the Pippins (1916, Short)
- Luke's Late Lunchers (1916, Short)
- Luke Laughs Last (1916, Short)
- Luke's Fatal Flivver (1916, Short)
- Luke, Crystal Gazer (1916, Short)
- Luke's Lost Lamb (1916, Short)
- Luke Does the Midway (1916, Short)
- Luke Joins the Navy (1916, Short)
- Luke and the Mermaids (1916, Short)
- Luke's Speedy Club Life (1916, Short)
- Luke and the Bang-Tails (1916, Short)
- Luke, the Chauffeur (1916, Short)
- Luke's Preparedness Preparations (1916, Short)
- Luke, the Gladiator (1916, Short)
- Luke, Patient Provider (1916, Short)
- Luke's Newsie Knockout (1916, Short)
- Luke's Movie Muddle (1916, Short)
- Luke, Rank Impersonator (1916, Short)
- Luke's Shattered Sleep (1916, Short)
- It Can't Be True! (1916, Short)
- Lonesome Luke on Tin Can Alley (1917, Short)
- Lonesome Luke Loses Patients (1917, Short)
- We Never Sleep (1917, Short)
- Shootin' Mad (1918)
- She Hired a Husband (1918) - Jerry Grogan
- The Son-of-a-Gun (1919) - Sheriff (uncredited)
- A Taste of Life (1919) - Detective
- A Favor To A Friend (1919) - William Z. Williams
- The Face in the Watch (1919, Short)
- Please Get Married (1919) - Mr. John Harper Ashley
- Her Elephant Man (1920) - Jerimy
- The Jack-Knife Man (1920) - 'Booge'
- Fickle Women (1920) - William Price
- Girls Don't Gamble (1920) - Wilbur Rathbone
- Patsy (1921)- Tramp
- The Sky Pilot (1921) - The Old Timer
- Keeping Up with Lizzie (1921) - Mr. Pettigrew
- Play Square (1921) - Betty's Father
- Penrod (1922) - (uncredited)
- According to Hoyle (1922) - Jim Riggs
- Bells of San Juan (1922) - John Engel
- Conquering the Woman (1922) - Sandy MacTavish
- The Danger Point (1922) - Sam Biggs
- What a Wife Learned (1923) - Tracy McGrath
- Three Jumps Ahead (1923) - Lige McLean
- The Barefoot Boy (1923) - Bill Hawkins
- Tea: With a Kick! (1923) - Chris Kringle
- Treasure Canyon (1924)
- Ride for Your Life (1924) - 'Plug' Hanks
- The Lone Chance (1924) - Burke
- A Self-Made Failure (1924) - The Constable
- The Sawdust Trail (1924) - Quid Jackson
- Horseshoe Luck (1924)
- Thundering Romance (1924) - Davey Jones
- Full Speed (1925)
- The Hurricane Kid (1925) - Hezekial Potts
- Quicker'n Lightnin' (1925) - Al McNutt
- The Outlaw's Daughter (1925) - Bookkeeper
- The Desert Demon (1925) - Snitz Doolittle
- Lorraine of the Lions (1925) - Colby
- Daring Days (1925) - Hank Skinner
- The Saddle Cyclone (1925) - Andy Simms
- Two-Fisted Jones (1925) - Bart Wilson
- Under Western Skies (1926) - Payne
- Coming an' Going (1926) - Andy Simms
- Chip of the Flying U (1926) - Weary
- The Flaming Frontier (1926) - California Joe
- Rawhide (1926) - Two Gun
- The Bonanza Buckaroo (1926) - Chewin' Charlie
- The Runaway Express (1926) - Dad Hamilton
- The Buckaroo Kid (1926) - Tom Darby
- Forest Havoc (1926)
- Prisoners of the Storm (1926) - Pete Le Grande
- The Third Degree (1926) - Mr. Chubb
- A One Man Game (1927) - Sam Baker
- The Ridin' Rowdy (1927) - Deefy
- Whispering Smith Rides (1927) - Train Engineer (uncredited)
- Skedaddle Gold (1927) - Rusty
- The Bugle Call (1927) - Cpl. Jansen
- White Pebbles (1927) - Tim
- The Interferin' Gent (1927) - Buddy
- The Obligin' Buckaroo (1927) - Bozo Muldoon
- Roarin' Broncs (1927)
- The Rawhide Kid (1928) - Comic
- Under the Tonto Rim (1928) - Bert
- The Flyin' Cowboy (1928) - Tom Gordon
- The River Woman (1928) - The Scrub
- The Pace That Kills (1928) - Uncle Caleb
- King of the Rodeo (1929) - J.G
- One Stolen Night (1929) - Blazer
- The King of the Kongo (1929) - Commodore
- Courtin' Wildcats (1929) - McKenzie
- Lucky Larkin (1930) - Bill Parkinson
- The Last Dance (1930) - Pa Kelly
- The Fighting Legion (1930) - Dad Williams
- Sons of the Saddle (1930) - 'Pop' Higgins
- Borrowed Wives (1930) - Lawyer Winstead
- Under Montana Skies (1930) - Abner Jenkins
- Ten Cents a Dance (1931) - Mr. Carney
- Ten Nights in a Barroom (1931) - Sample
- The Sign of the Wolf (1931) - John Farnum
- The Texas Ranger (1931) - Lynn Oldring - Clayton Rider
- In Old Cheyenne (1931) - Ben Stevens
- The Miracle Woman (1931) - Briggs (uncredited)
- Law of the Rio Grande (1931) - Cookie
- Branded (1931) - Robbed Stage Passenger (uncredited)
- Shotgun Pass (1931) - Sheriff Pete
- The Fighting Marshal (1931) - Pop
- The Deadline (1931) - Chloride
- Forbidden (1932) - (uncredited)
- One Man Law (1932) - Deputy Hank
- The Fighting Fool (1932) - Deputy Hoppy
- The Lone Trail (1932) - John Farnum
- Shopworn (1932) - Henry - The Counterman (uncredited)
- American Madness (1932) - Tom Gardner (uncredited)
- Fighting for Justice (1932) - Cookie
- Gold (1932) - Prospector (uncredited)
- White Eagle (1932) - Sam (uncredited)
- The Wyoming Whirlwind (1932) - Sheriff Joe Flagg
- Sundown Rider (1932) - Mulligan
- Her Splendid Folly (1933) - Witness
- Sucker Money (1933) - Harry (uncredited)
- Phantom Thunderbolt (1933) - Townsman (uncredited)
- Gun Law (1933) - Blackjack
- The Thrill Hunter (1933) - Station Agent
- Unknown Valley (1933) - Zeke (uncredited)
- Trouble Busters (1933) - Skinny Cassidy
- Gordon of Ghost City (1933, Serial) - Salesman (Ch. 4) (uncredited)
- Hold the Press (1933) - Press Room Foreman (uncredited)
- It Happened One Night (1934) - Flagman at Railroad Crossing (uncredited)
- David Harum (1934) - Elmer (uncredited)
- One Is Guilty (1934) - Danny O'Keefe
- The Prescott Kid (1934) - Dr. Lemuel Haley
- Broadway Bill (1934) - Pop Jones
- Westerner (1934) - Uncle Ben
- Lottery Lover (1935) - Hayseed (uncredited)
- Law Beyond the Range (1935) - Judge Avery
- Vagabond Lady (1935) - Crabby Clerk (uncredited)
