= Skedaddle Gold =

1927 film

- Directed by: Richard Thorpe
- Written by: James Dorrance; Richard Thorpe
- Produced by: Lester F. Scott Jr.
- Starring: Hal Taliaferro; Betty Baker; Bob Burns
- Cinematography: Ray Ries
- Production company: Action Pictures
- Distributed by: Pathe Exchange
- Release date: July 31, 1927
- Running time: 50 minutes
- Country: United States
- Languages: Silent; English intertitles

Skedaddle Gold is a lost 1927 American silent Western film directed by Richard Thorpe and starring Hal Taliaferro, Betty Baker and Bob Burns.

== Cast ==
- Hal Taliaferro as Kent Blake
- Betty Baker as Wanda Preston
- Bob Burns as Sheriff
- George F. Marion as George F.
- Harry Todd as Rusty
- Gordon Standing as John Martin

== Preservation ==
With no holdings located in archives, Skedaddle Gold is considered a lost film.

== Bibliography ==
- Langman, Larry. A Guide to Silent Westerns. Greenwood Publishing Group, 1992.
