= The Bonanza Buckaroo =

1926 film

- Directed by: Richard Thorpe
- Written by: Betty Burbridge; Barr Cross
- Produced by: Lester F. Scott Jr.
- Starring: Jay Wilsey; Harry Todd; Judith King
- Cinematography: Ray Ries
- Production company: Action Pictures
- Distributed by: Associated Exhibitors
- Release date: August 28, 1926 (US)
- Running time: 5 reels
- Country: United States
- Languages: Silent; English intertitles

The Bonanza Buckaroo is a 1926 American silent Western comedy film directed by Richard Thorpe and starring Jay Wilsey, Harry Todd, and Judith King. It was released on August 28, 1926.

== Plot ==
When Buffalo Bill Jr. rescues an older woman trapped in a runaway car, she invites him to dine with her and her wealthy husband. At dinner, Bill becomes entranced with the couples' daughter, Cleo. He quickly learns that Andrew Gordon's daughter will only marry someone with the means to support her in the style she is accustomed to. Bill is dismayed until he overhears a plot to snap up the property between Andrew Gordon's mine and that of his chief rival.

With the help of his sidekick, Chewin' Charlie, they subdue Fraction Jack and manage to stake their claim to the land first. Leaving Charlie to guard the claim, Bill heads back to town to register their stake. With the claim in hand, Bill approaches Andrew and they come to an agreement for Gordon to purchase the claim, expanding his holdings. It also satisfies Gordon that Bill has the business sense needed to marry his daughter. Bill arrives back at the claim just in time to save Charlie from claim jumpers.

== Cast ==
- Jay Wilsey as Bill Merritt (credited as Buffalo Bill Jr.)
- Harry Todd as Chewin' Charlie
- Judith King as Cleo Gordon (credited as Judy King)
- Lafe McKee as Andrew Gordon
- Winifred Landis as Mrs Andrew Gordon
- Al Taylor as Carney
- Slim Whitaker as Fraction Jack (credited as Charles Whitaker)
- Denman Maley as Spike (credited as Dutch Maley)
- Emily Barrye as the maid
- William Ryno as the sheriff (credited as Bill Ryno)

== Production ==
Production on the film was completed by the end of June 1926. It was the second of the "Buffalo Bill Jr." series for Action Pictures. The first of the series was Rawhide, also directed by Thorpe and starring Wilsey. In November it was part of a number of films which were picked up by Pathe for distribution.

== Reception ==
Motion Picture News gave the film a "fair" rating. They enjoyed the flow of the story, and the novelty of the characters' motivations. They also highlighted the cinematography of Ray Reis. The Moving Picture World gave the picture a better review. They enjoyed the way comedy had been intertwined with the action, saying "it leaves little to be desired for this type of entertainment." They felt it elevated the status of the Buffalo Bill Jr. franchise.
