= The Pay-Off =

The Pay-Off may refer to:

- The Pay-Off (1930 film)
- The Pay-Off (1926 film)
