= Fast Fightin' =

1925 film

- Directed by: Richard Thorpe
- Written by: A. E. Serrao; Richard Thorpe
- Produced by: Lester F. Scott Jr.
- Starring: Buddy Roosevelt; Nell Brantley; Joe Rickson
- Cinematography: Ray Ries
- Production company: Action Pictures
- Distributed by: Weiss Brothers
- Release date: February 15, 1925
- Running time: 50 minutes
- Country: United States
- Languages: Silent; English intertitles

Fast Fightin' is a 1925 American silent Western film directed by Richard Thorpe and starring Buddy Roosevelt, Nell Brantley and Joe Rickson.

== Cast ==
- Buddy Roosevelt as Buddy
- Nell Brantley as The Girl
- Joe Rickson as The Man
- Emily Barrye as The Other Woman
- James Sheridan as The Boy
- Emma Tansey as The Mother
- Leonard Trainor as The Sheriff

== Preservation ==
With no holdings located in archives, Fast Fightin' is considered a lost film.

== Bibliography ==
- Connelly, Robert B. The Silents: Silent Feature Films, 1910-36, Volume 40, Issue 2. December Press, 1998.
- Munden, Kenneth White. The American Film Institute Catalog of Motion Pictures Produced in the United States, Part 1. University of California Press, 1997.
