= Between Dangers =

1927 film

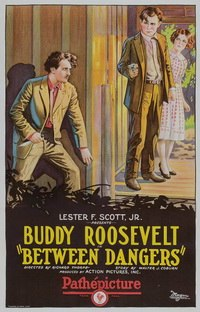
- Poster for the film
- Directed by: Richard Thorpe
- Written by: Richard Thorpe
- Based on: Ride 'Im, Cowboy by Walter J. Coburn
- Produced by: Lester F. Scott Jr.
- Starring: Buddy Roosevelt; Alma Rayford; Rennie Young
- Production company: Action Pictures
- Distributed by: Pathé Exchange
- Release date: February 13, 1927 (US)
- Running time: 5 reels
- Country: United States
- Languages: Silent; English intertitles

Between Dangers is a 1927 American silent Western film. Directed by Richard Thorpe, the film stars Buddy Roosevelt, Alma Rayford, and Rennie Young. It was released on February 13, 1927.

== Plot ==
When Tom Rawlins inherits a ranch, he heads out to take possession. On the way he is waylaid by three crooks in a saloon who knock him out and take the ownership papers to the ranch. When he wakes up, he hitches a ride on a freight train which drops him off in Cactus City, the nearest town to his ranch. Shortly after his arrival, the local bank is robbed and one of the citizens is killed. Santine, the foreman at the Cross P Ranch, Rawlins' inheritance, incites the citizenry to believe that Rawlins is the culprit in the bank robbery, and he is arrested. However, while in jail he convinces the sheriff and the sheriff's daughter, Sue Conway, that he is innocent.

Meanwhile, Santine gets one of his henchmen, Charlie, to pose as Rawlins in order to claim possession of the ranch. Santine has been working with the attorney who drew up the will of the ranch owner to cheat Rawlins out of his inheritance. When Sue overhears that Santine actually murdered the former ranch owner, she is captured by Santine and the attorney. Rawlins escapes from the jail, and rescues Sue. During the rescue, Santine falls off a cliff to his death.

Rawlins recovers his ownership papers and takes possession of his ranch, as well as getting the girl.

== Cast ==
- Buddy Roosevelt as Tom Rawlins
- Alma Rayford as Sue Conway
- Rennie Young as Santine
- Al Taylor as Charlie
- Charles Thurston as Sheriff
- Allen Sewall
- Edward W. Borman
- Hank Bell

== Production ==
In early February 1927, Pathe announced the film was to be released on February 13. The producer was announced as Lester F. Scott Jr., with a screenplay by Richard Thorp (who also directed the film), adapted from a short story by Walter J. Coburn, which had originally appeared in Action Stories Magazine.

== Reception ==
The Film Daily gave the film a good review, saying it "... strikes a happy medium" providing "... action, romance, thrills." While they thought the plot was not original, they felt the pacing was lively and Ray Ries' cinematography was good. Motion Picture News also enjoyed the film, and while it was incredibly melodramatic, they called it a "good, plausible melodrama", which gives "...thrills galore and many exciting, hectic situations." The felt the plot was "intricate and interesting", and praised the direction and the acting. "Magazine Story Provides Buddy Roosevelt With Exceptionally Fast Vehicle – One Of His Best" was the subtitle of the review in The Moving Picture World. They did not find much originality in the plot, they felt the individual plot lines merged well, and the pace was also done at a quick enough pace to sustain suspense. They particularly highlighted the direction of Thorpe and the acting of Roosevelt.
