= Fast and Fearless =

1924 film

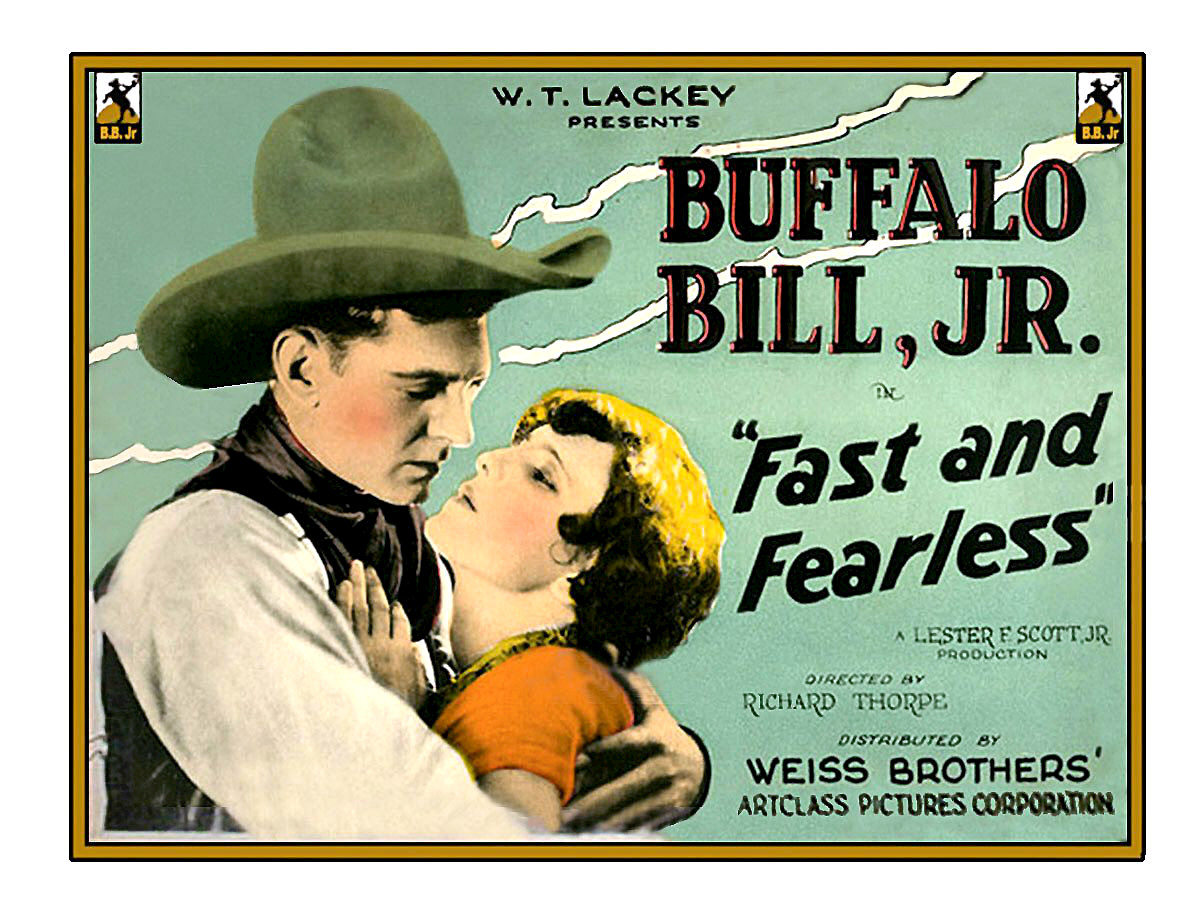
- Film poster
- Directed by: Richard Thorpe
- Written by: Betty Burbridge
- Produced by: William T. Lackey
- Starring: Buffalo Bill, Jr. Jean Arthur
- Cinematography: Irving G. Ries
- Distributed by: Action Pictures
- Release date: September 15, 1924
- Running time: 49 minutes
- Country: United States
- Languages: Silent film English intertitles

Fast and Fearless is a 1924 American silent Western film directed by Richard Thorpe, written by Betty Burbridge and starring Buffalo Bill, Jr. and Jean Arthur. The film is mostly lost: only reel 2 out of 5 has been saved at the Library of Congress.

== Plot ==
Lightning Bill Lewis (Bill, Jr.) pursues to capture a gang led by Pedro Gómez (Magrill) that has been terrorizing a border town. When Pedro captures his girlfriend (Arthur), Bill uses the help of Captain Duerta (Riverto) to stop Pedro. In the end, Pedro is caught by Mexican soldiers and Bill is free to marry his girl.

== Cast ==
- Buffalo Bill, Jr. as Lightning Bill Lewis
- Jean Arthur as Mary Brown
- William H. Turner as Judge Brown
- George Magrill as Pedro Gómez
- Julian Rivero as Captain Duerta
- Emily Barrye as Blanca
- Kewpie King as Fatty Doolittle
- Steve Clemente as Gonzales
- Victor Allen as Sheriff Hawkins
