= The Obligin' Buckaroo =

1927 film

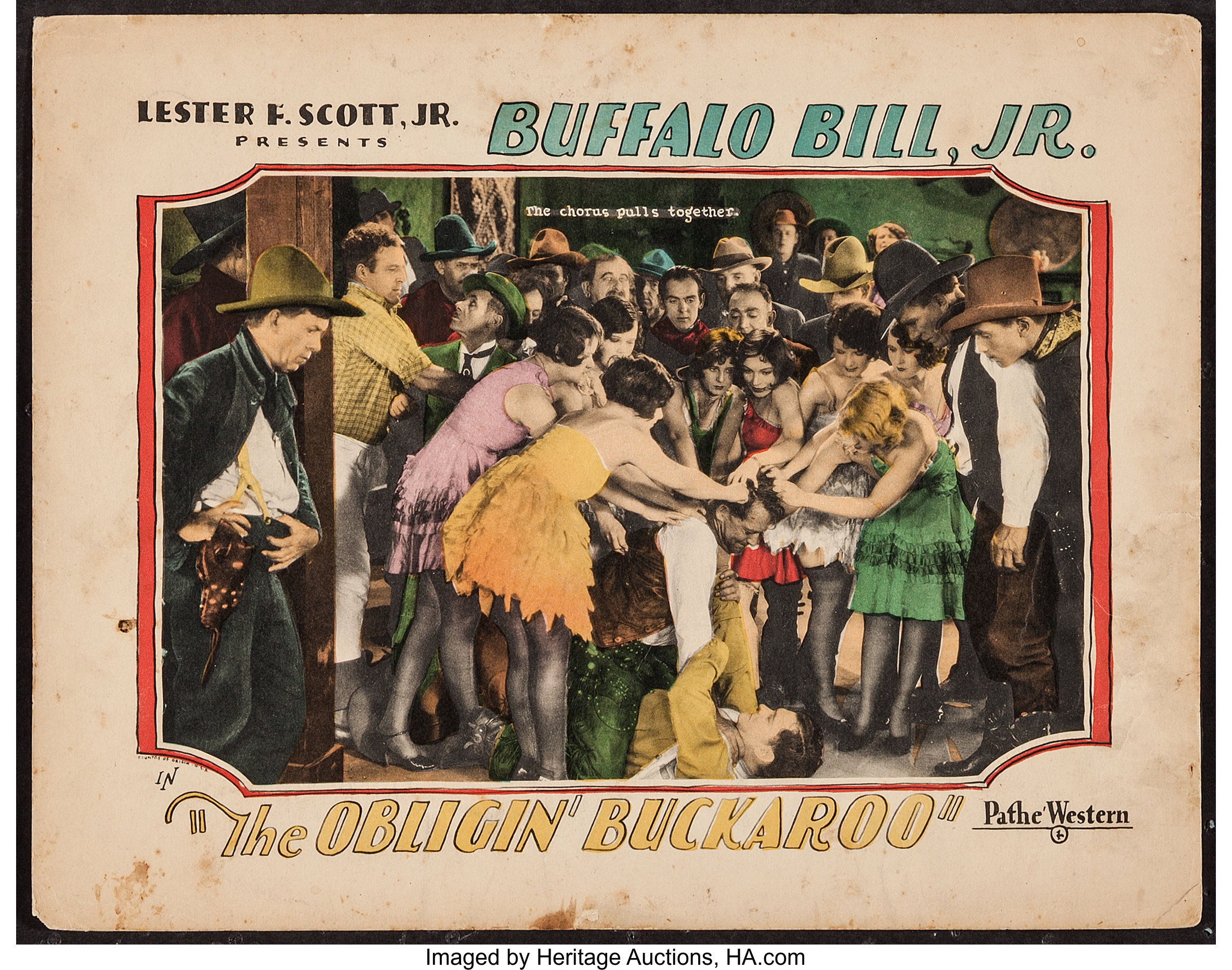
- Directed by: Richard Thorpe
- Written by: Bert B. Perkins; Richard Thorpe
- Produced by: Lester F. Scott Jr.
- Starring: Jay Wilsey; Olive Hasbrouck; James Sheridan
- Cinematography: Ray Ries
- Production company: Action Pictures
- Distributed by: Pathé Exchange
- Release date: October 16, 1927
- Country: United States
- Languages: Silent; English intertitles

The Obligin' Buckaroo is a 1927 American silent Western film directed by Richard Thorpe and starring Jay Wilsey, Olive Hasbrouck and James Sheridan.

== Cast ==
- Jay Wilsey as Bill Murray
- Olive Hasbrouck as Tess Cole
- James Sheridan as Steve Cole
- Harry Todd as Bozo Muldoon
- Raye Hampton as Fifi
- Slim Whitaker as Blackie

== Bibliography ==
- Darby, William. Masters of Lens and Light: A Checklist of Major Cinematographers and Their Feature Films. Scarecrow Press, 1991.
