= Trouble Busters =

1933 film by Lewis D. Collins

- Theatrical release poster
- Directed by: Lewis D. Collins
- Written by: Oliver Drake
- Produced by: Henry L. Goldstone; Larry Darmour
- Starring: Jack Hoxie; Lane Chandler; Kaye Edwards
- Cinematography: William Nobles
- Edited by: S. Roy Luby
- Production company: Larry Darmour Productions
- Distributed by: Majestic Pictures
- Release date: May 13, 1933
- Running time: 55 minutes
- Country: United States
- Language: English

Trouble Busters is a 1933 American pre-Code Western film directed by Lewis D. Collins and starring Jack Hoxie, Lane Chandler and Kaye Edwards.

== Cast ==
- Jack Hoxie as Tex Blaine
- Lane Chandler as Jim Perkins
- Kaye Edwards as Mary Ann Perkins
- Harry Todd as Skinny Cassidy
- Ben Corbett as Windy Wallace
- Slim Whitaker as Big Bill Jarvis
- William P. Burt as Dan Allen
- Roger Williams as Placerville Sheriff
