= The Twin Triggers =

1926 film

- Directed by: Richard Thorpe
- Written by: Betty Burbridge; Jack Townley
- Produced by: Lester F. Scott Jr.
- Starring: Buddy Roosevelt; Nita Cavalier; Frederick Lee
- Production company: Action Pictures
- Distributed by: Weiss Brothers
- Release date: April 13, 1926
- Country: United States
- Languages: Silent; English intertitles

The Twin Triggers is a 1926 American silent Western film directed by Richard Thorpe and starring Buddy Roosevelt, Nita Cavalier, and Frederick Lee.

== Cast ==
- Buddy Roosevelt as Bud Trigger / Kenneth Trigger
- Nita Cavalier as Gwen
- Frederick Lee as Dan Wallace
- Laura Lockhart as Muriel Trigger
- Lafe McKee as Silas Trigger
- Slim Whitaker as Kelly
- Clyde McClary as Bugs
- Togo Frye as The Cook
- Hank Bell as The Law

== Bibliography ==
- Munden, Kenneth White. The American Film Institute Catalog of Motion Pictures Produced in the United States, Part 1. University of California Press, 1997.
