= The Interferin' Gent =

1926 film

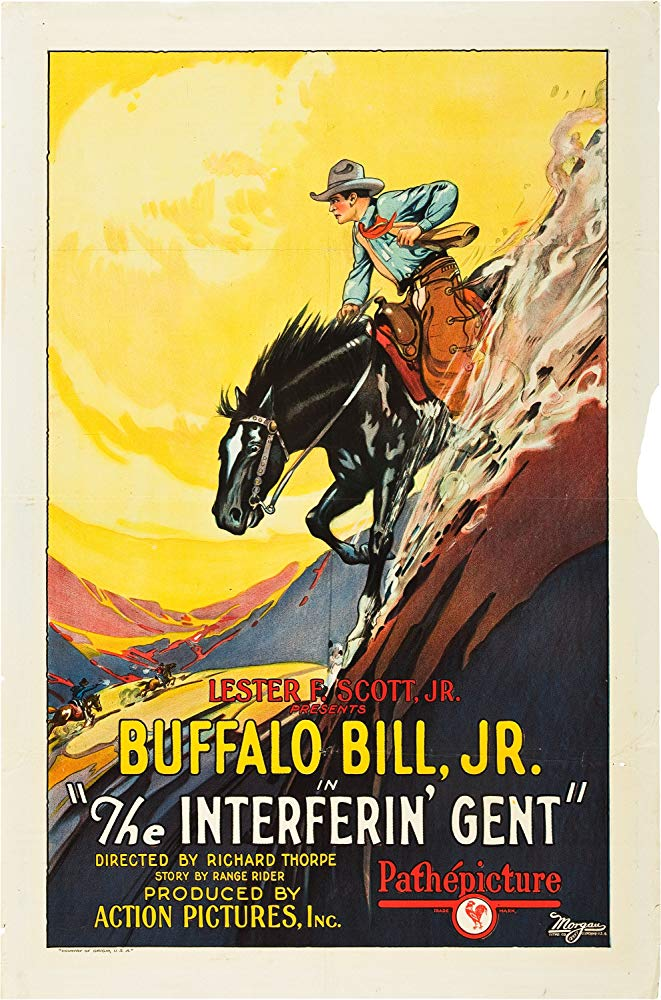
- Directed by: Richard Thorpe
- Written by: Betty Burbridge; Range Rider
- Produced by: Lester F. Scott Jr.
- Starring: Jay Wilsey; Al Taylor; Olive Hasbrouck
- Cinematography: Ray Ries
- Production company: Action Pictures
- Distributed by: Pathé Exchange
- Release date: August 21, 1926 (US)
- Running time: 5 reels
- Country: United States
- Languages: Silent; English intertitles

The Interferin' Gent is a 1926 American silent Western film directed by Richard Thorpe. It stars Jay Wilsey, Al Taylor, and Olive Hasbrouck. It was released on August 21, 1927.

== Cast list ==
- Jay Wilsey as Bill Stannard (credited as Buffalo Bill Jr.)
- Olive Hasbrouck as Ann Douglas
- Al Taylor as Ben Douglas
- Harry Todd as Buddy
- Jack McDonald as Joe Luke
