= A Streak of Luck =

1925 film

- Directed by: Richard Thorpe
- Written by: Philip Hubbard
- Produced by: Lester F. Scott Jr.
- Starring: Jay Wilsey; Dorothy Wood; Nelson McDowell
- Production company: Action Pictures
- Distributed by: Weiss Brothers
- Release date: December 23, 1925
- Running time: 50 minutes
- Country: United States
- Languages: Silent; English intertitles

A Streak of Luck is a 1925 American silent Western film directed by Richard Thorpe and starring Jay Wilsey, Dorothy Wood and Nelson McDowell.

== Synopsis ==
A playboy is disowned by his banker father after getting his name in the newspapers too often. He decides to head West where he falls in love and enjoys a series of adventures.

== Cast ==
- Jay Wilsey as Billy Burton
- Dorothy Wood as Francie Oliver
- Nelson McDowell as Big Ben Tuttle
- Bertram Marburgh as Mr. Burton
- Slim Whitaker as Black Pete
- Fred Holmes as Burton's Valet
- George Y. Harvey as Police Officer
- Edward Klein as Burton's Secretary
- John M. O'Brien as Jack Hurst
- Norbert A. Myles as Sam Kellman

== Bibliography ==
- Connelly, Robert B. The Silents: Silent Feature Films, 1910-36, Volume 40, Issue 2. December Press, 1998.
- Munden, Kenneth White. The American Film Institute Catalog of Motion Pictures Produced in the United States, Part 1. University of California Press, 1997.
