= Wheels of Destiny =

- Theatrical release poster
- Directed by: Alan James
- Screenplay by: Nate Gatzert
- Produced by: Ken Maynard
- Starring: Ken Maynard; Dorothy Dix; Philo McCullough; Frank Rice; Jay Wilsey; Edward Coxen; Fred Sale Jr. Fred MacKaye
- Cinematography: Ted McCord
- Edited by: Charles Harris
- Production company: Ken Maynard Productions Inc.
- Distributed by: Universal Pictures
- Release date: March 1, 1934
- Running time: 64 minutes
- Country: United States
- Language: English

Wheels of Destiny is a 1934 American Western film directed by Alan James and written by Nate Gatzert. The film stars Ken Maynard, Dorothy Dix, Philo McCullough, Frank Rice, Jay Wilsey, Edward Coxen, Fred Sale Jr. and Fred MacKaye. The film was released on March 1, 1934, by Universal Pictures.

== Cast ==
- Ken Maynard as Ken Manning
- Dorothy Dix as Mary Collins
- Philo McCullough as Rocky
- Frank Rice as Pinwheel
- Jay Wilsey as Bill Collins
- Edward Coxen as Dad Collins
- Fred Sale Jr. as Freddie Collins
- Fred MacKaye as Red
- Jack Rockwell as Ed
- William Gould as Deacon
- Nelson McDowell as Trapper
- Chief John Big Tree as Chief War Eagle
