= The Valley of Hunted Men =

1928 film

- Directed by: Richard Thorpe
- Written by: Harrington Strong; Richard Thorpe
- Starring: Jay Wilsey; Oscar Apfel; Kathleen Collins
- Cinematography: Ray Ries
- Production company: Action Pictures
- Distributed by: Pathé Exchange
- Release date: February 19, 1928
- Running time: 54 minutes
- Country: United States
- Languages: Silent; English intertitles

The Valley of Hunted Men is a 1928 American silent Western film directed by Richard Thorpe and starring Jay Wilsey, Oscar Apfel and Kathleen Collins.

== Cast ==
- Jay Wilsey as Tom Mallory
- Oscar Apfel as Dan Phillips
- Kathleen Collins as Betty Phillips
- Jack Ganzhorn as 'Frenchy' Durant
- Alma Rayford as Valita
- Frank Griffith as 'Yucca' Jake
- Frank Ellis as Henchman
- Adrienne Dore (uncredited)

== Bibliography ==
- Langman, Larry. A Guide to Silent Westerns. Greenwood Publishing Group, 1992.
