= Bad Man's Bluff =

1926 film

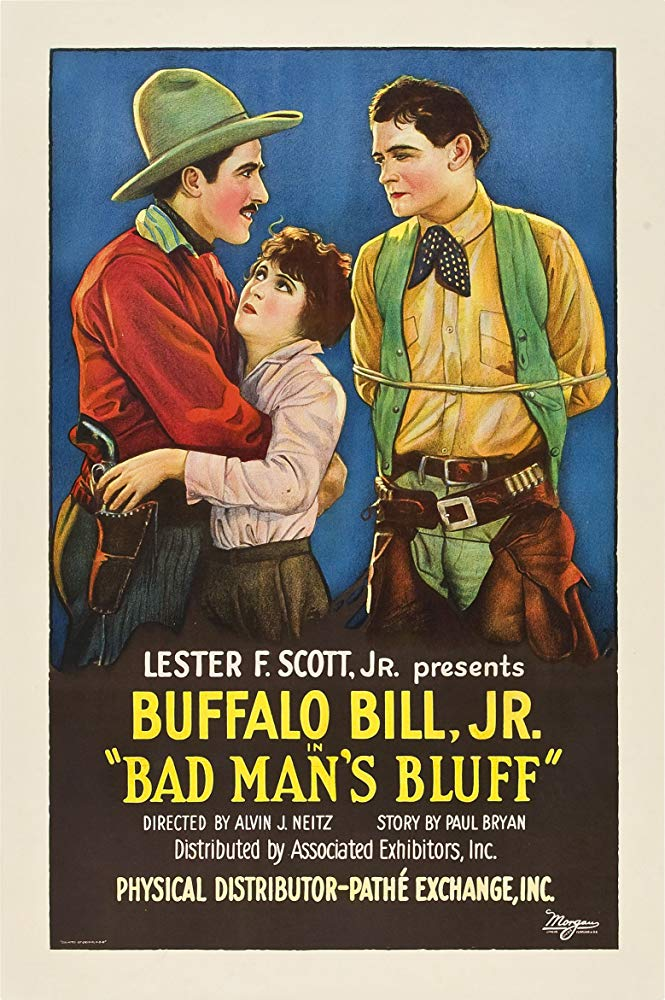
- Directed by: Alan James
- Written by: Paul M. Bryan; Betty Burbridge
- Produced by: Lester F. Scott Jr.
- Starring: Jay Wilsey; Molly Malone; Frank Whitson
- Production company: Action Pictures
- Distributed by: Associated Exhibitors
- Release date: December 26, 1926
- Country: United States
- Languages: Silent; English intertitles

Bad Man's Bluff is a lost 1926 American silent Western film directed by Alan James and starring Jay Wilsey, Molly Malone and Frank Whitson. It was the last film to be distributed under the Associated Exhibitors banner following its merger with Pathe Exchange. Future star Gary Cooper appeared as an extra.

== Cast ==
- Jay Wilsey as Zane Castleton
- Molly Malone as Alice Hardy
- Frank Whitson as Dave Hardy
- Robert McKenzie as Hank Dooley
- Wilbur McGaugh as Joe Slade
- Gary Cooper as Extra

== Preservation ==
With no holdings located in archives, Bad Man's Bluff is considered a lost film.
