= The Desert Demon =

1925 film

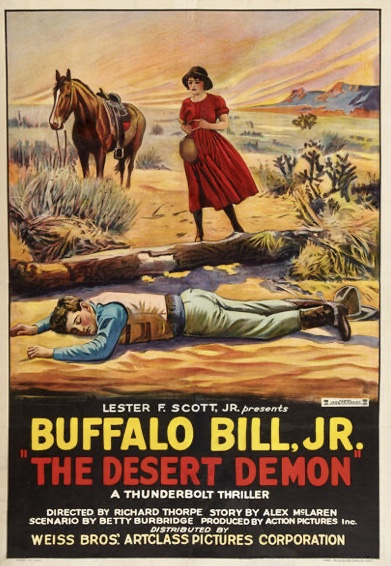
- Film poster
- Directed by: Richard Thorpe
- Written by: Alex McLaren
- Produced by: Lester F. Scott Jr.
- Starring: Jay Wilsey; Betty Morrissey; Harry Todd
- Cinematography: Ray Ries
- Production company: Action Pictures
- Distributed by: Weiss Brothers
- Release date: October 4, 1925
- Running time: 50 minutes
- Country: United States
- Language: Silent (English intertitles)

The Desert Demon is a 1925 American silent Western film directed by Richard Thorpe and starring Jay Wilsey, Betty Morrissey, and Harry Todd. The film was one of eight films released by Weiss Brothers under the banner of “Thunderbolt Thrillers,” all starring Buffalo Bill, Jr.

== Plot ==
As described in a film magazine review, Bill Davis, also known as Buffalo Bill, Jr., saves a young Indian woman from an attack by Jim Slade. Lost in the desert, Bill's horse dies of thirst. Nita Randall, whose father runs a nearby mine, arrives just in time to prevent Bill from suffering a similar fate. Slade plots to gain control of the Randall mine. One of the conspirators is shot by Randall, who dies from an injury but believes that he has killed his enemy. Bill takes the blame, but Nita, concerned by the loss of her father, is temporarily influenced against him. Her eyes are opened when Bill beats up Slade. Bill and Nita are united in matrimony.

== Cast ==
- Jay Wilsey as Bill Davis
- Betty Morrissey as Nita Randall
- Frank Ellis as Jim Slade
- Harry Todd as Snitz Doolittle
- John M. O'Brien as Bugs
- Frank Austin as Dad Randall
- Margarita Martín as Squaw

== Censorship ==
Before The Desert Demon could be exhibited in Kansas, the Kansas Board of Review required the removal of a scene in reel 1, only described as "actions of drunken man with bottle."

== Preservation ==
The Desert Demon is currently presumed lost. In February of 2021, the film was cited by the National Film Preservation Board on their Lost U.S. Silent Feature Films list.

== Bibliography ==
- Connelly, Robert B. The Silents: Silent Feature Films, 1910-36, Volume 40, Issue 2. December Press, 1998.
- Munden, Kenneth White. The American Film Institute Catalog of Motion Pictures Produced in the United States, Part 1. University of California Press, 1997.
