= The Ballyhoo Buster =

1928 film by Richard Thorpe

- Directed by: Richard Thorpe
- Written by: Robert Wallace; Frank L. Inghram
- Produced by: Lester F. Scott Jr.
- Starring: Jay Wilsey; Peggy Shaw; Nancy Nash
- Cinematography: Ray Ries
- Production company: Action Pictures
- Distributed by: Pathé Exchange
- Release date: January 8, 1928 (US)
- Running time: 5 reels
- Country: United States
- Languages: Silent; English intertitles

The Ballyhoo Buster is a 1928 American silent Western film. Directed by Richard Thorpe, the film stars Jay Wilsey, Peggy Shaw, and Nancy Nash. It was released on January 8, 1928.

== Plot ==
After selling cattle to two strangers, Bob Warner is later drugged by those same men, who steal the money they had paid for the herd. Penniless, his girl leaves him for a rival suitor. Warner leaves town and meets a medicine show proprietor, who lets him join the show. Warner's job will be to last three rounds with anyone who challenges him in the ring, a "ballyhoo". He becomes quite a draw, and eventually the show makes an appearance in Warner's home town. He is challenged by the man who stole his girlfriend. While in the ring with a contestant, he notices the two robbers among the spectators. He knocks out the contestant, then chases after the two crooks. In the chase, one of the crooks hops into a car and then loses control, plunging over an incline and killing him. Warner catches up to the other and overcomes him, recovering his money.

== Cast ==
- Jay Wilsey as Bob Warner (credited as Buffalo Bill Jr.)
- Peggy Shaw as Molly Burnett
- Nancy Nash as Dorothy
- Albert Hart as Medicine show proprietor
- Floyd Shackelford (credited as Floyd Shackleford)
- Lafe McKee
- George Magrill as Brooks Mitchell
- Jack Richardson as Jim Burnett
- Walter Brennan
- Al Taylor

== Production ==
At the beginning of January, Pathé announced that they would be releasing ten films in January, the first of which would be The Ballyhoo Buster. The film was released on January 8, 1928.

== Reception ==
Motion Picture News gave the film a positive review, calling it "... a well told story, capably acted and directed and with a smattering of events that have not as yet been hashed to death by the makers of films of the great outdoors." The Film Daily also gave it a positive review, highlighting the new different angle for a western film. They enjoyed Buffalo Bill's performance, but felt that Thorpe's direction was only satisfactory, but praised the cinematography of Ries.

== Preservation ==
With no holdings located in archives, The Ballyhoo Buster is considered a lost film.
