= William T. Lackey =

American film producer

- Born: February 4, 1896; Saugerties, New York, United States
- Died: July 9, 1974 (aged 78); Burbank, California, United States
- Occupation: Producer
- Years active: 1924-1951 (film)

William T. Lackey (1896–1974) was an American film producer. He worked with Monogram Pictures for a number of years.

== Filmography ==
- Fast and Fearless (1924)
- Hard-Hittin' Hamilton (1924)
- Bringin' Home the Bacon (1924)
- Thundering Romance (1924)
- Defend Yourself (1925)
- Pursued (1925)
- Full Speed (1925)
- Frenzied Flames (1926)
- Forest Havoc (1926)
- The Pay-Off (1926)
- Race Wild (1926)
- Lightning Reporter (1926)
- Speeding Through (1926)
- The Warning Signal (1926)
- Fire and Steel (1927)
- Burning Gold (1927)
- Duty's Reward (1927)
- Riding to Fame (1927)
- Roaring Fires (1927)
- Hazardous Valley (1927)
- An Oklahoma Cowboy (1929)
- Guilty or Not Guilty (1932)
- Klondike (1932)
- Self Defense (1932)
- Skyway (1933)
- He Couldn't Take It (1933)
- The Phantom Broadcast (1933)
- The Sweetheart of Sigma Chi (1933)
- A Woman's Man (1934)
- The Loudspeaker (1934)
- City Limits (1934)
- Beggars in Ermine (1934)
- Girl o' My Dreams (1934)
- Lost in the Stratosphere (1934)
- Shock (1934)
- A Girl of the Limberlost (1934)
- The Nut Farm (1935)
- The Keeper of the Bees (1935)
- Wanderer of the Wasteland (1935)
- Nevada (1935)
- And Sudden Death (1936)
- Drift Fence (1936)
- Forgotten Faces (1936)
- Desert Gold (1936)
- Murder Goes to College (1937)
- Born to the West (1937)
- Under the Big Top (1938)
- Gangster's Boy (1938)
- Mr. Wong in Chinatown (1939)
- Mr. Wong, Detective (1939)
- Navy Secrets (1939)
- Streets of New York (1939)
- The Mystery of Mr. Wong (1939)
- Tomboy (1940)
- Haunted House (1940)
- The Fatal Hour (1940)
- Father Steps Out (1941)
- Here Comes Kelly (1943)
- The Lucky Stiff (1949)
- Destination Big House (1950)
- Pride of Maryland (1951)
- Street Bandits (1951)
- Insurance Investigator (1951)
- Secrets of Monte Carlo (1951)

== Bibliography ==
- Goble, Alan. The Complete Index to Literary Sources in Film. Walter de Gruyter, 1999.
