= Lester F. Scott Jr. =

American film producer

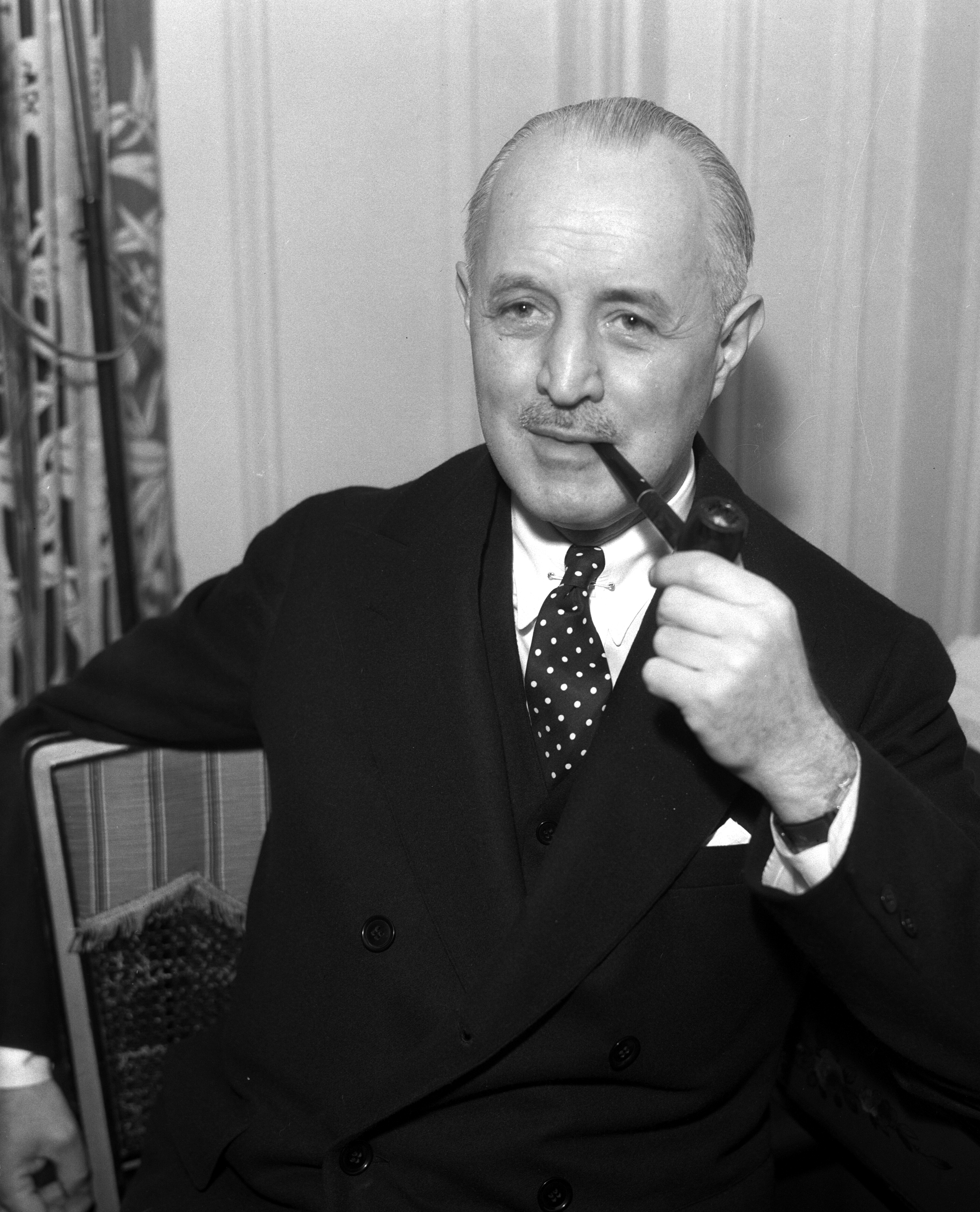
- Scott in the 1930s
- Born: 1883; United States
- Died: April 16, 1954 (aged 70–71); Mesa, Arizona, United States
- Occupation: Producer
- Years active: 1924-1939 (film)

Lester F. Scott Jr. (1883–1954) was an American film producer of the silent and early sound eras. He specialized in producing western films, many of them directed by Richard Thorpe.

== Selected filmography ==
- Walloping Wallace (1924)
- Battling Buddy (1924)
- Bringin' Home the Bacon (1924)
- Thundering Romance (1924)
- Gold and Grit (1925)
- Reckless Courage (1925)
- The Desert Demon (1925)
- The Saddle Cyclone (1925)
- Galloping On (1925)
- On the Go (1925)
- Double Action Daniels (1925)
- A Streak of Luck (1925)
- Fast Fightin' (1925)
- Rawhide (1926)
- The Bonanza Buckaroo (1926)
- The Interferin' Gent (1926)
- Twisted Triggers (1926)
- Bad Man's Bluff (1926)
- Double Daring (1926)
- The Twin Triggers (1926)
- Ace of Action (1926)
- The Bandit Buster (1926)
- The Obligin' Buckaroo (1927)
- The Fightin' Comeback (1927)
- The Soda Water Cowboy (1927)
- The Cyclone Cowboy (1927)
- Between Dangers (1927)
- The Desert of the Lost (1927)
- White Pebbles (1927)
- Skedaddle Gold (1927)
- Roarin' Broncs (1927)
- The Galloping Gobs (1927)
- Pals in Peril (1927)
- Tearin' Into Trouble (1927)
- The Ridin' Rowdy (1927)
- Ride 'em High (1927)
- The Ballyhoo Buster (1928)
- Saddle Mates (1928)
- The Flyin' Buckaroo (1928)
- Border Romance (1929)
- Secrets of Hollywood (1933)
- The Oil Raider (1934)
- Badge of Honor (1934)
- The Fighting Rookie (1934)
- Get That Man (1935)
- Rescue Squad (1935)
- Calling All Cars (1935)
- Daughter of the Tong (1939)

== Bibliography ==
- Michael R. Pitts. Poverty Row Studios, 1929–1940: An Illustrated History of 55 Independent Film Companies, with a Filmography for Each. McFarland & Company, 2005.
