= Pals in Peril (film) =

1927 film

- Directed by: Richard Thorpe
- Written by: Walter J. Coburn; Betty Burbridge; Richard Thorpe
- Produced by: Lester F. Scott Jr.
- Starring: Jay Wilsey; Olive Hasbrouck; George Ovey
- Cinematography: Ray Ries
- Production company: Action Pictures
- Distributed by: Pathe Exchange
- Release date: June 26, 1927
- Running time: 50 minutes
- Country: United States
- Languages: Silent; English intertitles

Pals in Peril is a 1927 American silent Western film directed by Richard Thorpe and starring Jay Wilsey, Olive Hasbrouck and George Ovey.

== Cast ==
- Jay Wilsey as Bill Gordon
- Olive Hasbrouck as Mary Bassett
- George Ovey as Shorty Gilmore
- Edward Hearn as Blackie Burns
- Robert Homans as Sheriff Kipp
- Bert Lindley as Luther Fox
- Harry Belmour as Hank Bassett
- Raye Hampton as Mrs. Bassett

== Bibliography ==
- Langman, Larry. A Guide to Silent Westerns. Greenwood Publishing Group, 1992.
