= On the Go =

1925 film

On The Go
- Directed by: Richard Thorpe
- Written by: Richard Thorpe
- Produced by: Lester F. Scott Jr.
- Starring: Jay Wilsey; Helen Foster; Nelson McDowell
- Cinematography: Ray Ries
- Production company: Action Pictures
- Distributed by: Weiss Brothers
- Release date: April 4, 1925
- Running time: 50 minutes
- Country: United States
- Languages: Silent; English intertitles

On The Go is a 1925 American silent Western film directed by Richard Thorpe and starring Jay Wilsey, Helen Foster and Nelson McDowell.

== Cast ==
- Jay Wilsey as Bill Drake
- Helen Foster as Nell Hall
- Lafe McKee as Mr. Hall
- Nelson McDowell as Philip Graves
- Raye Hampton as Matilda Graves
- Slim Whitaker as Tom Evans
- Louis Fitzroy as Mr. Evans
- George F. Marion as Eb Moots
- Alfred Hewston as Snoopy O'Sullivan
- Morgan Davis as Sheriff
- Pietro Sosso as City specialist

== Bibliography ==
- Connelly, Robert B. The Silents: Silent Feature Films, 1910-36, Volume 40, Issue 2. December Press, 1998.
- Munden, Kenneth White. The American Film Institute Catalog of Motion Pictures Produced in the United States, Part 1. University of California Press, 1997.
