= The Soda Water Cowboy =

1927 American silent Western film

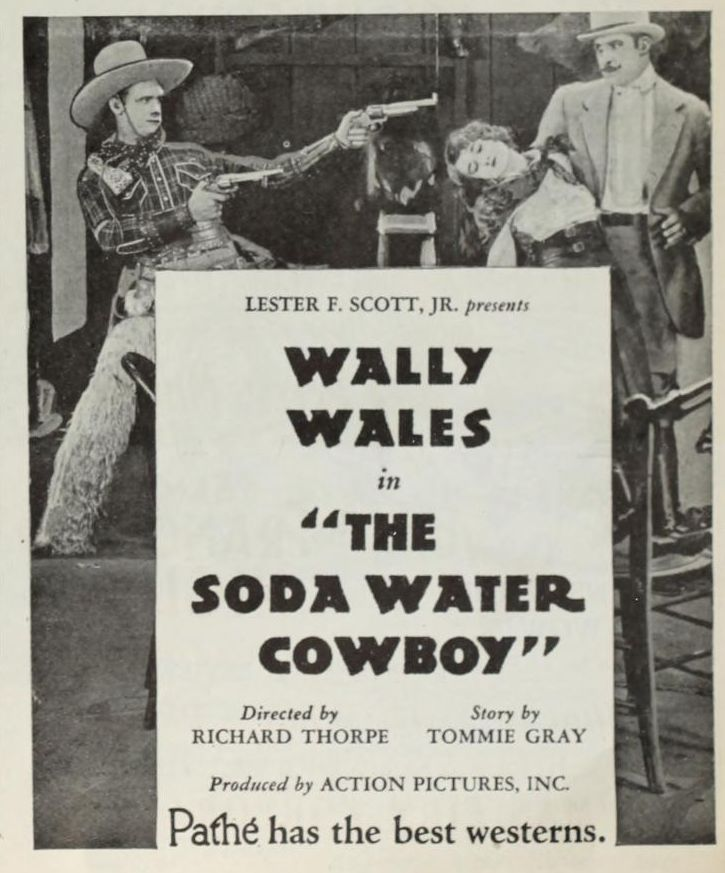
- Directed by: Richard Thorpe
- Written by: Betty Burbridge; Tommy Gray
- Produced by: Lester F. Scott Jr.
- Starring: Hal Taliaferro; Beryl Roberts; J. P. Lockney
- Cinematography: Ray Ries
- Production company: Action Pictures
- Distributed by: Pathé Exchange
- Release date: September 25, 1927 (US)
- Running time: 5 reels
- Country: United States
- Language: Silent (English intertitles)

The Soda Water Cowboy is a 1927 American silent Western film. Directed by Richard Thorpe, the film stars Hal Taliaferro, Beryl Roberts, and J. P. Lockney. It was released on September 25, 1927.

== Cast ==
- Hal Taliaferro as Wally (credited as Wally Wales)
- Beryl Roberts as Mademoiselle Zalla
- J. P. Lockney as Professor Beerbum
- Slim Whitaker as Ross (credited as Charles Whitaker)
- Al Taylor as Joe
