= Deuce High =

1926 silent film by Richard Thorpe

- Directed by: Richard Thorpe
- Produced by: Action Pictures
- Starring: Buffalo Bill Jr.
- Distributed by: Weiss Brothers Artclass Pictures
- Release date: April 22, 1926
- Running time: 6 reels
- Country: United States
- Languages: Silent; English intertitles

Deuce High is a 1926 American silent Western film directed by Richard Thorpe and starring Buffalo Bill Jr. (a.k.a. Jay Wilsey).

Preserved in the UCLA, Library of Congress and Cinematheque Royale (Brussels) archives.

== Cast ==
- Jay Wilsey - Ted Crawford (* aka Buffalo Bill Jr.)
- Alma Rayford - Neil Clifton
- Robert Walker - Ranger McLeod
- J. P. Lockney - Mandell Armstrong
- Harry Lord - Jim Blake
