= Double Action Daniels =

1925 film

- Directed by: Richard Thorpe
- Written by: Betty Burbridge
- Produced by: Lester F. Scott Jr.
- Starring: Jay Wilsey; J.P. Lockney; D'Arcy Corrigan
- Cinematography: Ray Ries
- Production company: Action Pictures
- Distributed by: Weiss Brothers
- Release date: May 8, 1925
- Running time: 50 minutes
- Country: United States
- Languages: Silent; English intertitles

Double Action Daniels is a 1925 American silent Western film directed by Richard Thorpe and starring Jay Wilsey, J.P. Lockney and D'Arcy Corrigan.

== Cast ==
- Jay Wilsey as Double Action Daniels
- Lorna Palmar a Ruth Fuller
- Edna Hall as Mother Rose Daniels
- J.P. Lockney as Old Bill Daniels
- Edward Peil Sr. as Jack Monroe
- D'Arcy Corrigan as Richard Booth
- N.E. Hendrix as Davis
- Lafe McKee as The Banker
- Harry Belmour as The Hotelkeeper
- Clyde McClary as The Sheriff
- William Ryno as The Wop
- Cy Belmore as The Kid
- Sammy Thomas as Sammy

== Bibliography ==
- Connelly, Robert B. The Silents: Silent Feature Films, 1910-36, Volume 40, Issue 2. December Press, 1998.
- Munden, Kenneth White. The American Film Institute Catalog of Motion Pictures Produced in the United States, Part 1. University of California Press, 1997.
