= Hazardous Valley =

1927 silent film

- Directed by: Alan James
- Written by: Barry Barringer
- Produced by: William T. Lackey
- Starring: Sheldon Lewis; Virginia Brown Faire; David Torrence
- Cinematography: Harold Wenstrom
- Production company: W.T. Lackey Productions
- Distributed by: Ellbee Pictures
- Release date: August 6, 1927
- Running time: 62 minutes
- Country: United States
- Languages: Silent; English intertitles

Hazardous Valley is a 1927 American silent drama film directed by Alan James and starring Sheldon Lewis, Virginia Brown Faire and David Torrence.

== Cast ==
- Vincent Brownell
- Virginia Brown Faire
- Sheldon Lewis
- Pat Harmon
- David Torrence
- Andrew Arbuckle
- Burr McIntosh

== Bibliography ==
- Robert B. Connelly. The Silents: Silent Feature Films, 1910-36, Volume 40, Issue 2. December Press, 1998.
