= Saddle Mates =

1928 film

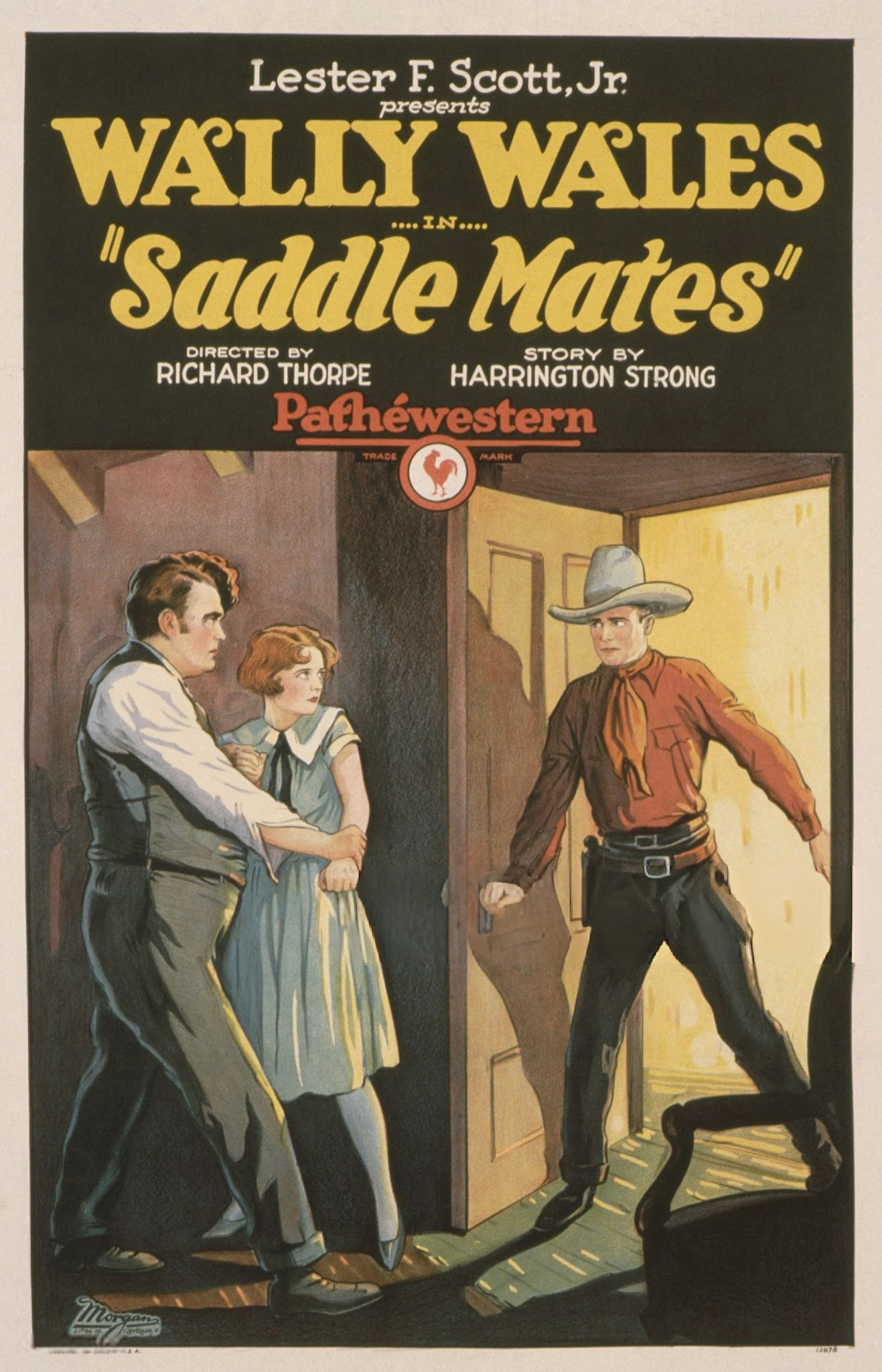
- Directed by: Richard Thorpe
- Written by: Johnston McCulley; Richard Thorpe
- Produced by: Lester F. Scott Jr.
- Starring: Hal Taliaferro; Hank Bell; Peggy Montgomery
- Cinematography: Ray Ries
- Production company: Action Pictures
- Distributed by: Pathé Exchange
- Release date: August 5, 1928
- Country: United States
- Languages: Silent; English intertitles

Saddle Mates is a 1928 American silent Western film directed by Richard Thorpe and starring Hal Taliaferro, Hank Bell and Peggy Montgomery. Two partners seek revenge on the man who has cheated them out of their ranch.

== Cast ==
- Hal Taliaferro as John Benson
- Hank Bell as Tim Mannick
- J. Gordon Russell as Morgan Shelby
- Peggy Montgomery as Betty Shelby
- Slim Whitaker as Bob Grice
- Lafe McKee as Grouchy Ferris
- Edward Cecil as George Lemmer
- Lillian Allen as Mrs. Saunders

== Bibliography ==
- Langman, Larry. A Guide to Silent Westerns. Greenwood Publishing Group, 1992.
