= Roarin' Broncs =

1927 film

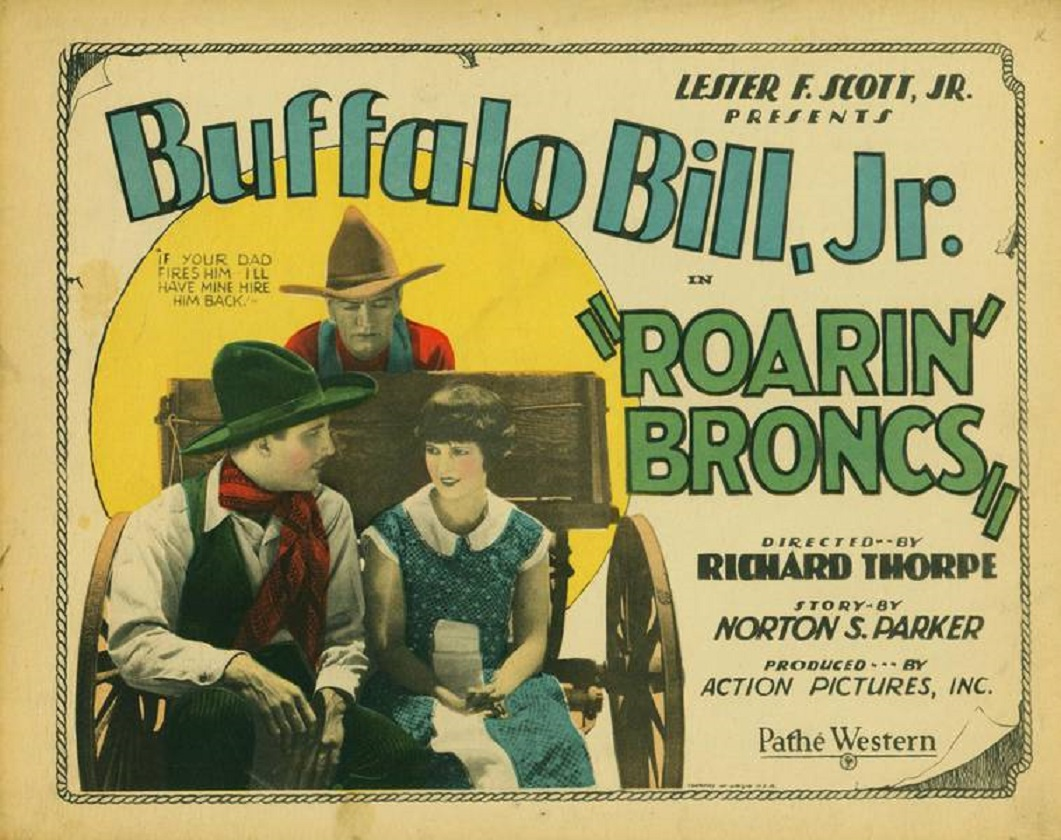
- Directed by: Richard Thorpe
- Written by: Norton S. Parker; Richard Thorpe
- Produced by: Lester F. Scott Jr.
- Starring: Jay Wilsey; Ann McKay; Harry Todd
- Cinematography: Ray Ries
- Production company: Action Pictures
- Distributed by: Pathe Exchange
- Release date: November 27, 1927
- Running time: 50 minutes
- Country: United States
- Languages: Silent; English intertitles

Roarin' Broncs is a 1927 American silent Western film directed by Richard Thorpe and starring Jay Wilsey, Ann McKay and Harry Todd.

== Plot ==
U.S. Border Patrol agent Bill Morris investigates the Tracy and Ball Ranch about an operation smuggling Chinese immigrants across the Mexico–United States border. Morris discovers the rancher's son Henry Ball to be responsible but gets captured by the gang after a motorcycle chase. Morris escapes from a shack, captures a tractor, and apprehends the gang.

== Cast ==
- Jay Wilsey as Bill Morris
- Ann McKay as Rose Tracy
- Harry Todd
- Lafe McKee
- George Magrill as Henry Ball

== Bibliography ==
- Langman, Larry. A Guide to Silent Westerns. Greenwood Publishing Group, 1992.
