= The Saddle Cyclone =

1925 film

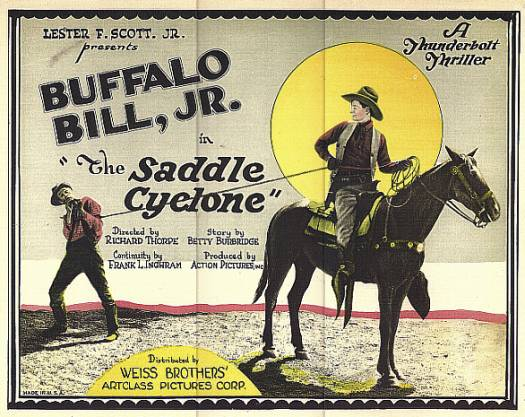
- Poster
- Directed by: Richard Thorpe
- Written by: Betty Burbridge
- Produced by: Lester F. Scott Jr.
- Starring: Jay Wilsey; Harry Todd; Lafe McKee
- Cinematography: Ray Ries
- Production company: Action Pictures
- Distributed by: Weiss Brothers
- Release date: November 13, 1925
- Running time: 50 minutes
- Country: United States
- Language: Silent (English intertitles)

The Saddle Cyclone is a 1925 American silent Western film directed by Richard Thorpe and starring Jay Wilsey, Harry Todd, and Lafe McKee.

== Plot ==
As described in a film magazine review, Regan and Burns intend to foreclose a mortgage on Lowery's ranch. Lowery's foreman, Bill Demming, and his assistant get into a scrap. Bill runs away and is charged with murder. He impersonates Lowery in order to get money from the latter's grandfather to pay off the mortgage and succeeds, but is compelled to marry Alice Roland, the old man's niece. Bill is cleared of the murder chargeand Lowery's ranch is saved. Bill and Alice face a happy future together.

== Cast ==
- Jay Wilsey as Bill Demming
- Nell Brantley as Alice Roland
- Will Herford as Joshua Lowery
- Norbert A. Myles as Frank Lowery
- Harry Todd as Andy Simms
- Bob Fleming as Regan
- Lafe McKee as Burns

== Bibliography ==
- Connelly, Robert B. The Silents: Silent Feature Films, 1910-36, Volume 40, Issue 2. December Press, 1998.
- Munden, Kenneth White. The American Film Institute Catalog of Motion Pictures Produced in the United States, Part 1. University of California Press, 1997.
