= Slim Whitaker =

American actor (1893–1960)

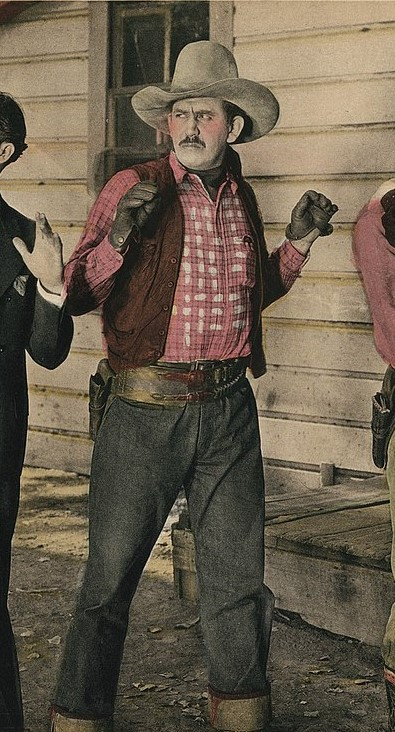
- Whitaker in The Ramblin' Galoot (1926)
- Born: Charles Orbie Whitaker; July 29, 1893; Kansas City, Missouri, U.S.
- Died: June 27, 1960 (aged 66); Los Angeles, California, U.S.
- Occupation: Actor
- Years active: 1914–1949
- Spouse: Ethel Maze (m. 1910; div. 1944)
- Children: 3

Charles Orbie "Slim" Whitaker (July 29, 1893 – June 27, 1960) was an American film actor. He appeared in more than 340 films between 1914 and 1949. He was born in Kansas City, Missouri, and died in Los Angeles, California, from a heart attack.

== Partial filmography ==
- The Man from Bitter Roots (1916)
- Eyes of Youth (1919)
- The Radio King (1922)
- Full Speed (1925)
- On the Go (1925)
- A Streak of Luck (1925)
- Galloping On (1925)
- The Bandit Buster (1926)
- The Bonanza Buckaroo (1926)
- The Fighting Cheat (1926)
- Double Daring (1926)
- The Stolen Ranch (1926)
- The Ramblin' Galoot (1926)
- Crossed Signals (1926)
- Bucking the Truth (1926)
- Ace of Action (1926)
- The Twin Triggers (1926)
- Rawhide (1926)
- Vanishing Hoofs (1926)
- The Lost Trail (1926)
- The Phantom Buster (1927)
- The Obligin' Buckaroo (1927)
- Soda Water Cowboy (1927)
- The Ridin' Rowdy (1927)
- The Desert of the Lost (1927)
- Manhattan Cowboy (1928)
- Desperate Courage (1928)
- The Flyin' Buckaroo (1928)
- Saddle Mates (1928)
- The Code of the Scarlet (1928)
- The Sunset Legion (1928)
- Cheyenne (1929)
- An Oklahoma Cowboy (1929)
- Headin' Westward (1929)
- Bad Men's Money (1929)
- Riders of the Storm (1929)
- Captain Cowboy (1929)
- Wyoming Tornado (1929)
- The Fighting Legion (1930)
- Oklahoma Cyclone (1930)
- The Dawn Trail (1930)
- Breed of the West (1930)
- Rider of the Plains (1931)
- Lightnin' Smith Returns (1931)
- Desert Vengeance (1931)
- The Cheyenne Cyclone (1931)
- Valley of Badmen (1931)
- The Hurricane Horseman (1931)
- Freighters of Destiny (1931)
- West of Cheyenne (1931)
- The Fighting Fool (1932)
- South of Santa Fe (1932)
- Outlaw Justice (1932)
- The Texas Tornado (1932)
- The Man from New Mexico (1932)
- Guns for Hire (1932)
- The Man from Monterey (1933)
- Trouble Busters (1933)
- War of the Range (1933)
- Unknown Valley (1933)
- Sagebrush Trail (1933)
- Fighting Through (1934)
- The Man from Hell (1934)
- The Law of the Wild (1934)
- Border Vengeance (1935)
- Arizona Bad Man (1935)
- Rustler's Paradise (1935)
- The Outlaw Tamer (1935)
- Blazing Guns (1935)
- Lawless Range (1935)
- The Last of the Clintons (1935)
- Desert Guns (1936)
- Ridin' On (1936)
- Everyman's Law (1936)
- Rio Grande Ranger (1936)
- Raw Timber (1937)
- Melody of the Plains (1937)
- Roaring Six Guns (1937)
- Pioneer Trail (1938)
- Lightning Carson Rides Again (1938)
- Phantom Gold (1938)
- The Fighting Gringo (1939)
- The Marshal of Mesa City (1939)
- Frontiers of '49 (1939)
- Billy the Kid in Texas (1940)
- Bullet Code (1940)
- Billy the Kid Wanted (1941)
- Billy the Kid's Round-Up (1941)
- The Lone Rider and the Bandit (1942)
- The Lone Rider in Texas Justice (1942)
- Arizona Stage Coach (1942)
- Billy the Kid's Smoking Guns (1942)
- The Mysterious Rider (1942)
- Death Rides the Plains (1943)
- The Kid Rides Again (1943)
- The Drifter (1944)
- Outlaws of the Plains (1946)
- Overland Riders (1946)
- Black Hills (1947)
