= Lafe McKee =

American actor (1872–1959)

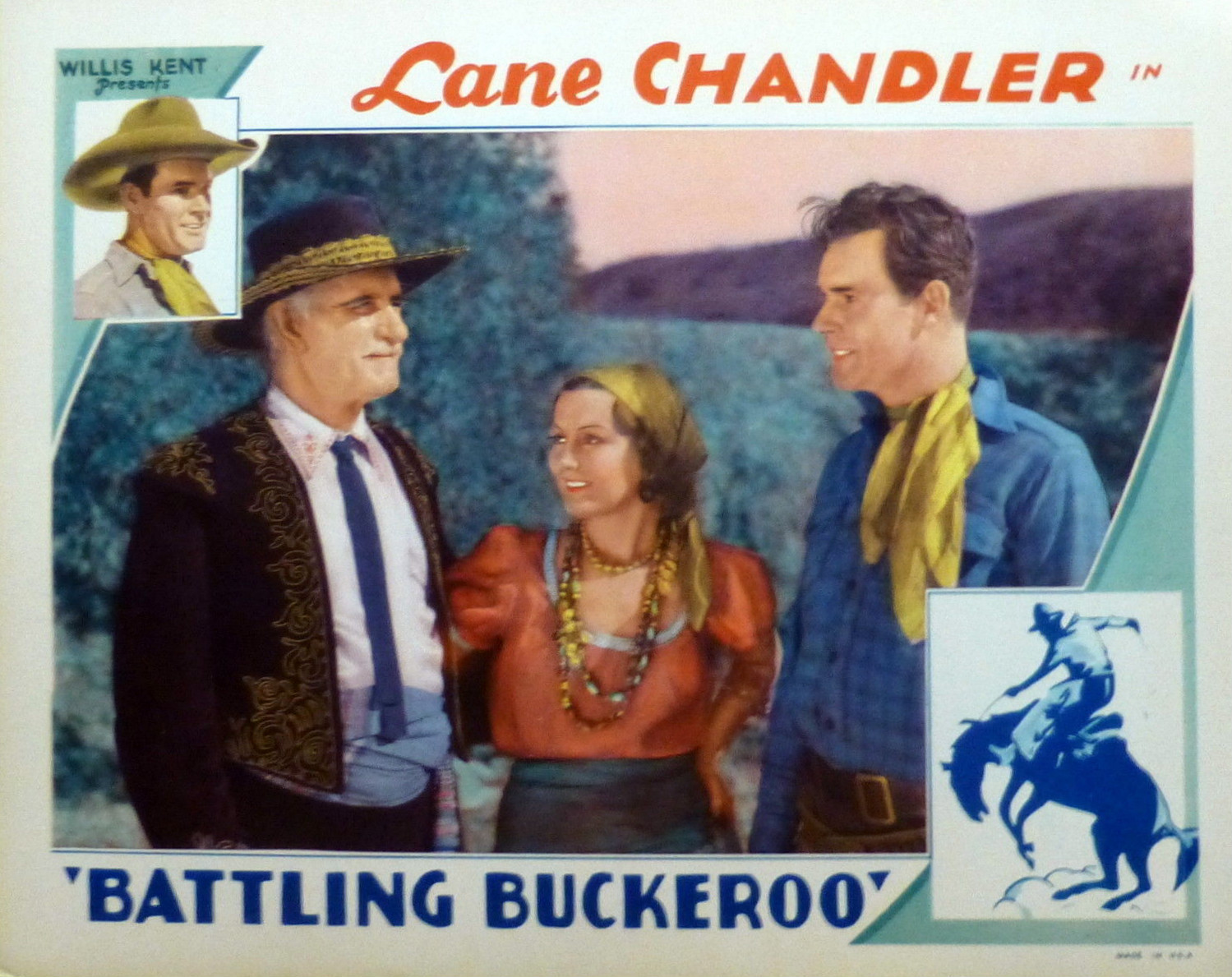
- McKee (left) on lobby card for Battling Buckaroo, 1932
- Born: Lafayette S. McKee; January 23, 1872; Morrison, Illinois, US
- Died: August 10, 1959 (aged 87); Temple City, California, US
- Occupation: Actor
- Years active: 1893–1948
- Spouse: Lelah Underwood (1900–1955) (her death)
- Children: 3

Lafayette S. "Lafe" McKee (January 23, 1872 – August 10, 1959) was an American actor who appeared in more than 400 films from 1912 to 1948.

== Early life, family and education ==
McKee was born in Morrison, Illinois, to Lucy (nee Johnson) and Jesse McKee, who "operated both a furniture business and a funeral parlor."

== Career ==
McKee began working in show business in 1893. At 40 years old, he and his family moved to Hollywood in 1912 and he began working in silent films.

Part of his career was spent with Art Mix Productions. McKee also worked as a stage actor from 1910 until at least 1932. His last film appearance was likely as a dancer in Belle Starr's Daughter when he was 76 years old.

== Personal life, legacy and demise ==
McKee and his wife Lelah "Lulu" Underwood (1900–1955) had three children: Lucille (born 1906) and Joe (born 1911). A third son, Dick, was born many years later (1925).

He died at age 87 of arteriosclerosis in Temple City, California. He is featured at the Heritage Museum in his hometown, Morrison, Illinois.

== Selected filmography ==
- The Adventures of Kathlyn (1913)
- The City of Purple Dreams (1918)
- In the Days of Buffalo Bill (1922)
- Blazing Arrows (1922)
- Silver Spurs (1922)
- Blood Test (1923)
- The Eagle's Claw (1924)
- Bringin' Home the Bacon (1924)
- The Terror of Pueblo (1924)
- Thundering Romance (1924)
- Full Speed (1925)
- On the Go (1925)
- Double Action Daniels (1925)
- The Saddle Cyclone (1925)
- The Human Tornado (1925)
- The Sporting Life (1925)
- The Bandit Buster (1926)
- The Bonanza Buckaroo (1926)
- The Man from Oklahoma (1926)
- Fort Frayne (1926)
- Officer 444 (1926)
- The Baited Trap (1926)
- West of the Law (1926)
- A Captain's Courage (1926)
- The Twin Triggers (1926)
- Rawhide (1926)
- The Desert of the Lost (1927)
- Daring Deeds (1927)
- Roarin' Broncs (1927)
- The Ridin' Rowdy (1927)
- Riding to Fame (1927)
- The Fire Fighters (1927)
- The Patent Leather Kid (1927)
- The Ballyhoo Buster (1928)
- Trailin' Back (1928)
- The Code of the Scarlet (1928)
- Riley of the Rainbow Division (1928)
- On the Divide (1928)
- The Ridin' Renegade (1928)
- The Painted Trail (1928)
- Saddle Mates (1928)
- Manhattan Cowboy (1928)
- Desperate Courage (1928)
- Trail Riders (1928)
- Vultures of the Sea (1928)
- Men Without Law (1930)
- The Lone Rider (1930)
- Under Montana Skies (1930)
- The Lonesome Trail (1930)
- The Utah Kid (1930)
- Breed of the West (1930)
- Code of Honor (1930)
- The Vanishing Legion (1931)
- The Fighting Marshal (1931)
- The Cyclone Kid (1931)
- Red Fork Range (1931)
- Lariats and Six-Shooters (1931)
- The Hurricane Horseman (1931)
- Alias – the Bad Man (1931)
- West of Cheyenne (1931)
- Two Gun Man (1931)
- Self Defense (1932)
- The Wyoming Whirlwind (1932)
- The Big Stampede (1932) - Cal Brett
- Ride Him, Cowboy (1932) - Rancher Marty Gordon (uncredited)
- The Riding Tornado (1932)
- The Boiling Point (1932)
- Mark of the Spur (1932)
- Battling Buckaroo (1932)
- The Gay Buckaroo (1932)
- End of the Trail (1932)
- The Texan (1932)
- The Fighting Champ (1932)
- Terror Trail (1933) - Shay
- The Telegraph Trail (1933) - Lafe
- Lightning Range (1933)
- War of the Range (1933)
- Under Secret Orders (1933)
- Whispering Shadow (1933) - D.W. Jerome
- The Man from Monterey (1933) - Don Jose Castanares
- Galloping Romeo (1933)
- Riders of Destiny (1933) - Sheriff Bill Baxter
- Cross Fire (1933)
- Blue Steel (1934) - Dan Mason
- West of the Divide (1934) - Fred Winters
- Hell Bent for Love (1934)
- Western Justice (1934)
- The Quitter (1934)
- Frontier Days (1934)
- The Hawk (1935)
- The Law of 45's (1935)
- The Last of the Clintons (1935)
- The Cheyenne Tornado (1935)
- The Desert Trail (1935) - Poker City Sheriff
- Rainbow Valley (1935) - Storekeeper (uncredited)
- The Ghost Rider (1935)
- Swifty (1935)
- Northern Frontier (1935)
- Blazing Guns (1935)
- Gun Smoke (1936)
- Idaho Kid (1936)
- The Lonely Trail (1936) - Prisoner Shot the Back (uncredited)
- Men of the Plains (1936) - Marshal Ed Green
- The Fighting Deputy (1937)
- Melody of the Plains (1937)
- Heroes of the Alamo (1937) - Lafe (Storekeeper)
- Six Shootin' Sheriff (1938)
- I'm From the City (1938)
- South of Arizona (1938)
- Mr. Smith Goes to Washington (1939) - Civil War Veteran at Lincoln Memorial (uncredited)
- The Lone Ranger Rides Again (1939) - Townsman [Ch. 6] (uncredited)
- Santa Fe Trail (1940) - Minister (uncredited)
- Covered Wagon Trails (1940)
- Pioneer Days (1940)
- Wild Horse Valley (1940)
