= The Bandit Buster =

1926 film

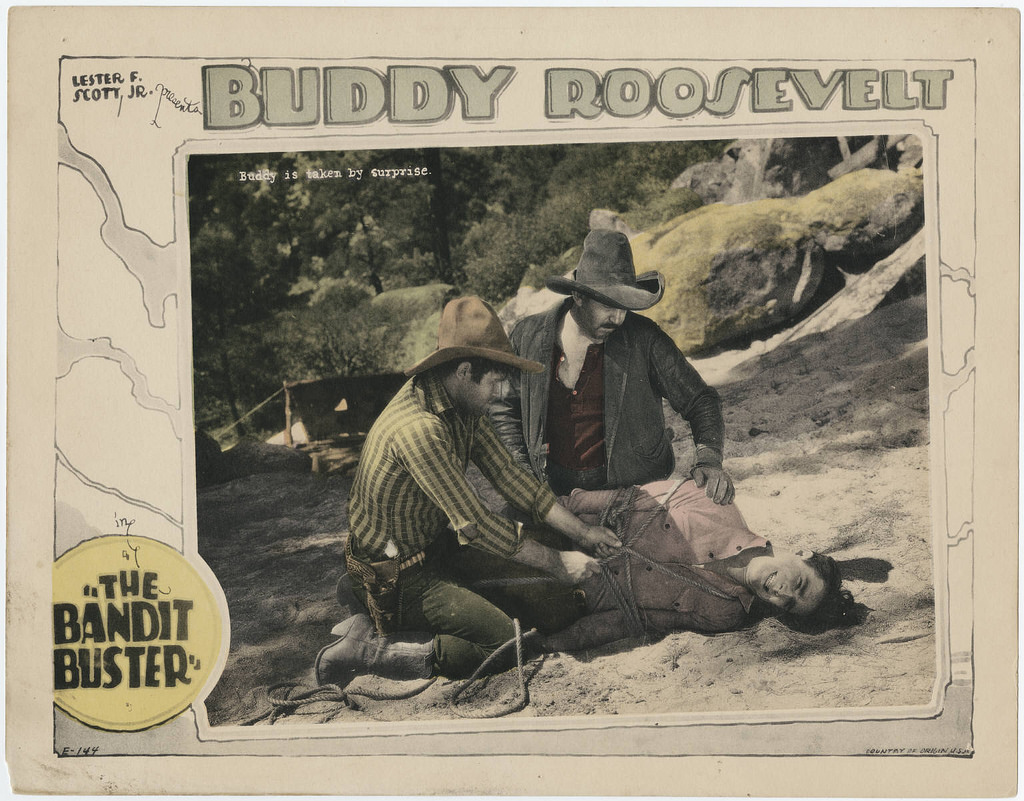
- Lobby card for the film
- Directed by: Richard Thorpe
- Written by: Frank L. Inghram; Richard Thorpe
- Produced by: Lester F. Scott Jr.
- Starring: Buddy Roosevelt; Molly Malone; Lafe McKee
- Production company: Action Pictures
- Distributed by: Associated Exhibitors
- Release date: December 19, 1926 (US)
- Running time: 5 reels
- Country: United States
- Languages: Silent; English intertitles

The Bandit Buster is a 1926 American silent Western film. Directed by Richard Thorpe, the film stars Buddy Roosevelt, Molly Malone, and Lafe McKee. It was released on December 19, 1926.

== Plot ==
Henry Morton is a prominent banker. His daughter, Sylvia, and his wife feel that he is working too hard. Sylvia enlists the help of her friend, Buddy Miller, who has romantic aspirations towards her, to fake a kidnapping, taking her father to a secluded cabin where he can rest for a week or two. Miller and his friend, Romeo, take Morton and bring him to a lakeside cabin.

Unbeknownst to Morton's wife and daughter, he was in the midst of a large business transaction. When Morton's subordinates go to Mrs. Morton for instructions as to whether hold or sell Morton's stock, Mrs. Morton discusses the situation with Sylvia. Their discussion is overheard, and real kidnappers are informed of his whereabouts, and go to the cabin and conduct a real kidnapping.

When Mrs. Morton receives the ransom demand, she believes that Miller is behind the kidnapping, and was only pretending to "fake kidnap" her husband. Sylvia also has her doubts. However, Miller tracks down the real kidnappers and rescues Morton, who upon his return finds his holdings greatly enhanced, allowing him to retire. Sylvia understands she was incorrect about Miller, and the two end up together.

== Cast ==
- Buddy Roosevelt as Buddy Miller
- Molly Malone as Sylvia Morton
- Lafe McKee as Henry Morton
- Winifred Landis as Mrs. Morton
- Robert Homans as Romeo
- Slim Whitaker as Steve (credited as Charles Whitaker)
- Al Taylor as Hotel clerk

== Production ==
A December 1926 article in Motion Picture News announced the release date as December 19, 1926. It gave credit for the story to Frank Inghram, while stating that Buddy Roosevelt as the star of the film, supported by Molly Malone, Lafe McKee, Winifred Landis, Robert Homans, Charles Whitaker (Slim Whitaker), and Al Taylor.

== Reception ==
Moving Picture World gave the film a positive review, calling it a "snappy actionful western story."

== Preservation ==
With no holdings located in archives, The Bandit Buster is considered a lost film.
