= Riding to Fame =

1927 silent film

- Directed by: Barry Barringer
- Written by: Barry Barringer
- Produced by: William T. Lackey
- Starring: George Fawcett; Rosemary Theby; Gladys McConnell
- Cinematography: Robert E. Cline
- Production company: W.T. Lackey Productions
- Distributed by: Ellbee Pictures
- Release date: July 1, 1927
- Running time: 60 minutes
- Country: United States
- Languages: Silent; English intertitles

Riding to Fame is a 1927 American silent sports drama film directed by Barry Barringer and starring George Fawcett, Rosemary Theby and Gladys McConnell.

== Cast ==
- George Fawcett as Old Man Randolph
- Rosemary Theby as Marge
- Gladys McConnell as Rose Randolph
- Arthur Rankin as Jackie
- Robert Emmett Tansey as Spec
- Henry Sedley as Joe Riordan
- Lafe McKee as Dr. Lorentz

== Bibliography ==
- Robert B. Connelly. The Silents: Silent Feature Films, 1910-36, Volume 40, Issue 2. December Press, 1998.
