= Forest Havoc =

1926 silent film

- Directed by: Stuart Paton
- Written by: Roy O. Reilly
- Produced by: William T. Lackey
- Starring: Forrest Stanley; Peggy Montgomery; Martha Mattox
- Cinematography: William H. Tuers
- Production company: W.T. Lackey Productions
- Distributed by: Ellbee Pictures
- Release date: November 15, 1926
- Running time: 60 minutes
- Country: United States
- Languages: Silent; English intertitles

Forest Havoc is a 1926 American silent drama film directed by Stuart Paton and starring Forrest Stanley, Peggy Montgomery, and Martha Mattox.

== Cast ==
- Forrest Stanley
- Peggy Montgomery
- Martha Mattox
- Ernest Hilliard
- Sidney De Gray
- Harry Todd

== Bibliography ==
- Robert B. Connelly. The Silents: Silent Feature Films, 1910-36, Volume 40, Issue 2. December Press, 1998.
