= Gold and Grit =

1925 film

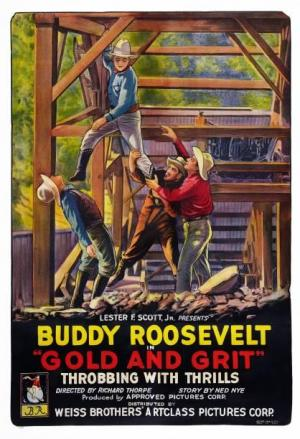
- Directed by: Richard Thorpe
- Written by: Ned Nye
- Produced by: Lester F. Scott Jr.
- Starring: Buddy Roosevelt; William H. Turner; Wilbur Mack
- Cinematography: Irving G. Ries
- Production company: Action Pictures
- Distributed by: Weiss Brothers
- Release date: January 15, 1925
- Running time: 50 minutes
- Country: United States
- Languages: Silent; English intertitles

Gold and Grit is a 1925 American silent Western film directed by Richard Thorpe and starring Buddy Roosevelt, William H. Turner and Wilbur Mack.

== Cast ==
- Buddy Roosevelt as Buddy
- Ann McKay as Helen Mason
- William H. Turner as Bill Mason
- L.J. O'Connor as Jim Crawford
- Wilbur Mack as Jack Crawford
- Nelson McDowell as Horatio Jefferson Blaabs
- Hank Bell as The Sheriff

== Bibliography ==
- Connelly, Robert B. The Silents: Silent Feature Films, 1910-36, Volume 40, Issue 2. December Press, 1998.
- Munden, Kenneth White. The American Film Institute Catalog of Motion Pictures Produced in the United States, Part 1. University of California Press, 1997.
