= The Ridin' Rowdy =

1927 film

- Directed by: Richard Thorpe
- Written by: Walter J. Coburn; Richard Thorpe
- Produced by: Lester F. Scott Jr.
- Starring: Jay Wilsey; Olive Hasbrouck; Harry Todd
- Cinematography: Ray Ries
- Production company: Action Pictures
- Distributed by: Pathe Exchange
- Release date: April 24, 1927
- Running time: 50 minutes
- Country: United States
- Languages: Silent; English intertitles

The Ridin' Rowdy is a 1927 American silent Western film directed by Richard Thorpe and starring Jay Wilsey, Olive Hasbrouck and Harry Todd.

== Cast ==
- Jay Wilsey as Bill Gibson
- Olive Hasbrouck as Patricia Farris
- Al Hart as Mose Gibson
- Harry Todd as Deefy
- Lafe McKee as Doc
- Jack McCredie as Shuler
- Slim Whitaker as Miller
- Walter Brennan
- Raye Hampton

== Bibliography ==
- James Robert Parish. Hollywood character actors. Arlington House, 1978.
