= Twisted Triggers =

1926 film

- Directed by: Richard Thorpe
- Written by: Betty Burbridge; Thomas J. Gray
- Produced by: Lester F. Scott Jr.
- Starring: Hal Taliaferro; Jean Arthur; William Bertram
- Cinematography: Ray Ries
- Production companies: Action Pictures; Sierra Pictures
- Distributed by: Associated Exhibitors
- Release date: July 11, 1926
- Running time: 56 minutes
- Country: United States
- Languages: Silent; English intertitles

Twisted Triggers is a 1926 American silent Western film directed by Richard Thorpe and starring Hal Taliaferro, Jean Arthur and William Bertram.

== Cast ==
- Hal Taliaferro as Wally Weston
- Jean Arthur as Ruth Regan
- Al Richmond as Norris
- Art Winkler as Angel-Face
- J.P. Lockney as Hiram Weston
- William Bertram as Jim Regan
- Harry Belmour as Cook
- Lawrence Underwood as Sheriff

== Bibliography ==
- Rainey, Buck. Sweethearts of the Sage: Biographies and Filmographies of 258 actresses appearing in Western movies. McFarland & Company, 1992.
