= Rawhide (1926 film) =

1926 film

- Directed by: Richard Thorpe
- Written by: Frank L. Inghram; Ralph Cummins
- Produced by: Lester F. Scott Jr.
- Starring: Jay Wilsey; Al Taylor; Molly Malone
- Production company: Action Pictures
- Distributed by: Associated Exhibitors
- Release date: May 23, 1926 (US)
- Running time: 5 reels
- Country: United States
- Languages: Silent; English intertitles

Rawhide is a 1926 American silent Western film. Directed by Richard Thorpe, the film stars Jay Wilsey, Al Taylor, and Molly Malone. It was released on May 23, 1926.

== Cast ==
- Jay Wilsey as Rawhide Rawlins (credited as Buffalo Bill Jr.)
- Al Taylor as Jim Reep
- Molly Malone as Nan
- Joe Rickson as Strobel
- Slim Whitaker as Blackie Croont (credited as Charles Whitaker)
- Harry Todd as Two Gun
- Ruth Royce as Queenie
- Lafe McKee as the law
