= The Pay-Off (1926 film) =

1926 film directed by Dell Henderson

- Directed by: Dell Henderson
- Produced by: W.T. Lackey
- Starring: Robert McKim; Marcella Daly; Charles Delaney
- Cinematography: William H. Tuers
- Production company: W.T. Lackey Productions
- Distributed by: Ellbee Pictures
- Release date: January 15, 1926
- Running time: 50 minutes
- Country: United States
- Languages: Silent; English intertitles

The Pay-Off is a 1926 American silent drama film directed by Dell Henderson and starring Robert McKim, Marcella Daly and Charles Delaney.

== Synopsis ==
A young woman and her father need a dam built on their property, but encounter difficulties which unknown to them are being caused by a financier they have encountered.

== Cast ==
- Robert McKim as The Financier
- Marcella Daly as The Young Woman
- Charles Delaney as The Young Man
- Otis Harlan as The Young Woman's Father

== Bibliography ==
- Connelly, Robert B. The Silents: Silent Feature Films, 1910-36, Volume 40, Issue 2. December Press, 1998.
- Munden, Kenneth White. The American Film Institute Catalog of Motion Pictures Produced in the United States, Part 1. University of California Press, 1997.
