= Thundering Romance =

1924 film

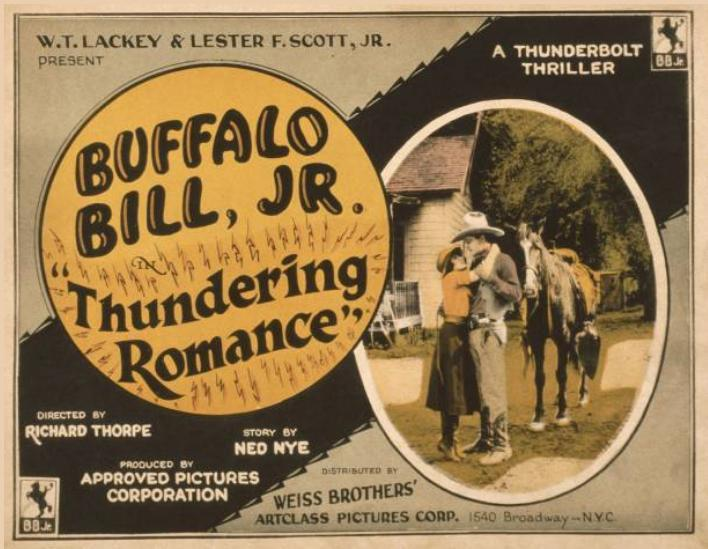
- Directed by: Richard Thorpe
- Written by: Ned Nye
- Produced by: Lester F. Scott Jr. William T. Lackey
- Starring: Jay Wilsey; Jean Arthur; Harry Todd
- Cinematography: Ray Ries
- Production company: Action Pictures
- Distributed by: Weiss Brothers
- Release date: December 15, 1924
- Running time: 50 minutes
- Country: United States
- Languages: Silent; English intertitles

Thundering Romance is a lost 1924 American silent Western film directed by Richard Thorpe and starring Jay Wilsey, Jean Arthur and Harry Todd.

== Cast ==
- Jay Wilsey as Lightning Bill
- Jean Arthur as Mary Watkins
- Rene Picot as Lew Simons
- Harry Todd as Davey Jones
- Lew Meehan as Hank Callahan
- J.P. Lockney as Mark Jennings
- George A. Williams as The Oil Representative
- Lafe McKee as The Sheriff

== Preservation ==
With no holdings located in archives, Thundering Romance is considered a lost film.

== Bibliography ==
- Connelly, Robert B. The Silents: Silent Feature Films, 1910-36, Volume 40, Issue 2. December Press, 1998.
- Munden, Kenneth White. The American Film Institute Catalog of Motion Pictures Produced in the United States, Part 1. University of California Press, 1997.
