= Double Daring =

1926 film

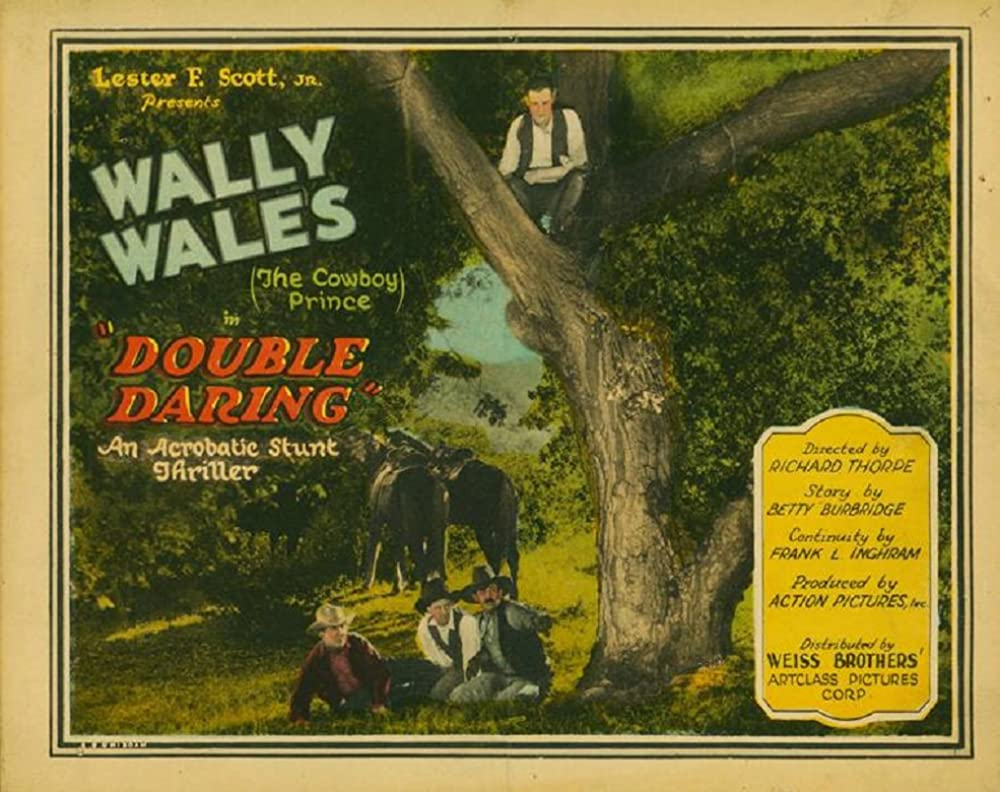
- Directed by: Richard Thorpe
- Written by: Betty Burbridge; Richard Thorpe
- Produced by: Louis Weiss; Lester F. Scott Jr.
- Starring: Hal Taliaferro; Jean Arthur; Toby Wing
- Production company: Action Pictures
- Distributed by: Weiss Brothers
- Release date: June 11, 1926
- Running time: 50 minutes
- Country: United States
- Languages: Silent; English intertitles

Double Daring is a 1926 American silent Western film directed by Richard Thorpe and starring Hal Taliaferro, Jean Arthur and Toby Wing.

== Synopsis ==
When the bank Wally Meeker works as a clerk in is robbed, he is wrongly accused of complicity and arrested. Escaping he goes into the hills in search of the gang behind the raid. Eventually cleared of any guilt he returns home to marry Marie Wells, the daughter of the bank's owner.

== Cast ==
- Hal Taliaferro as Wally Meeker
- J.P. Lockney as Banker Wells
- Jean Arthur as Marie Wells
- Hank Bell as Lee Falcon
- Slim Whitaker as Blackie Gorman
- Toby Wing as Nan
- N.E. Hendrix as The Law

== Preservation ==
Double Daring is currently presumed lost. In February of 2021, the film was cited by the National Film Preservation Board on their Lost U.S. Silent Feature Films list.

== Bibliography ==
- Connelly, Robert B. The Silents: Silent Feature Films, 1910-36, Volume 40, Issue 2. December Press, 1998.
- Munden, Kenneth White. The American Film Institute Catalog of Motion Pictures Produced in the United States, Part 1. University of California Press, 1997.
