= The Fighting Cheat =

1926 film directed by Richard Thorpe

- Directed by: Richard Thorpe
- Written by: Betty Burbridge
- Starring: Hal Taliaferro; Jean Arthur; Ted Rackerby
- Production company: Action Pictures
- Distributed by: Weiss Brothers Artclass Pictures
- Release date: February 11, 1926 (US)
- Running time: 5 reels
- Country: United States
- Language: Silent (English intertitles)

The Fighting Cheat is a 1926 American silent Western film. Directed by Richard Thorpe, the film stars Hal Taliaferro, Jean Arthur, and Ted Rackerby. It was released on February 11, 1926.

== Plot ==
As described in a film magazine review, Lafe Wells, a member of a bandit gang, is shot and left alone in the plains. Wally Kenyon finds him. Lafe, believing that he is dying, asks that his money be taken to his blind mother and Wally agrees to the wounded bandit's request. Wally accomplishes his mission and falls in love with Lafe's sister Ruth. However, Lafe recovers and later, when Ruth and Wally are ambushed by the outlaws, he brings the sheriff's men to their aid. The two lovers are united.

== Cast list ==
- Wally Wales as Wally Kenyon
- Jean Arthur as Ruth Wells
- Ted Rackerby as Lafe Wells
- Fanny Midgley as Mrs. Wells
- Slim Whitaker as Jud Nolan (credited as Charles Whitaker)
- V. L. Barnes as Doctor
- Al Taylor as Cook

== Reception ==
The Palladium-Item gave the film a good review, saying "It is difficult for any picture to beat this one for love, action, pathos and romance." They complimented the work of Wales and Arthur, as well as the scenic locations. The Appeal-Democrat also gave the film a positive review, complimenting the pace of the film, the acting of Wales and Arthur, and the use of action and romance.

== Preservation ==
With no holdings located in archives, The Fighting Cheat is considered a lost film.
