= Full Speed (1925 film) =

1925 film

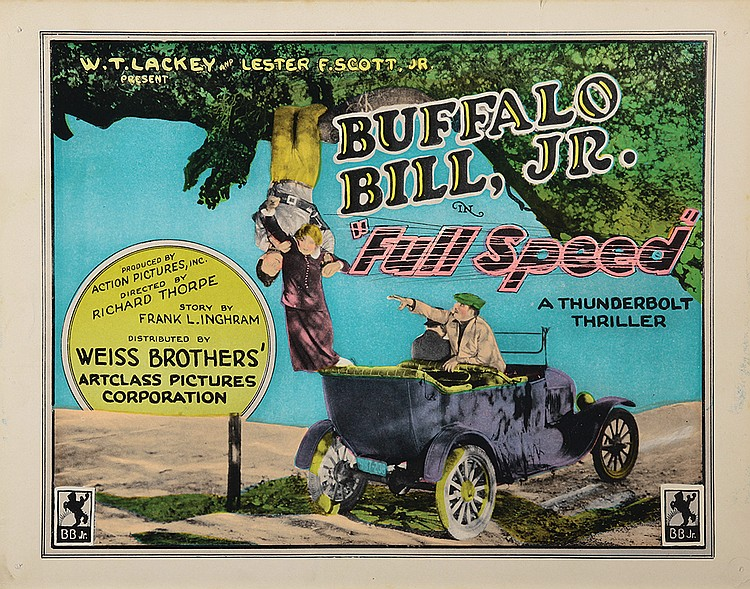
- Directed by: Richard Thorpe
- Written by: Betty Burbridge
- Produced by: William T. Lackey
- Starring: Jay Wilsey
- Cinematography: Ray Ries
- Production company: Action Pictures
- Distributed by: Weiss Brothers Artclass Pictures
- Release date: January 15, 1925
- Running time: 5 reels
- Country: United States
- Languages: Silent; English intertitles

Full Speed is a 1925 American silent Western film directed by Richard Thorpe and starring Jay Wilsey whose alias was Buffalo Bill Jr.

The film is preserved in the Library of Congress collection.

== Cast ==
- Jay Wilsey (* billed as Buffalo Bill Jr.)
- Mildred Vincent
- Jerome La Grasse
- Lafe McKee
- Lew Meehan
- Slim Whitaker
