= Bringin' Home the Bacon =

1924 film

- Directed by: Richard Thorpe
- Written by: Christopher Booth; Lester F. Scott Jr.
- Produced by: William T. Lackey
- Starring: Jay Wilsey; Jean Arthur; Bert Lindley
- Production company: Action Pictures
- Distributed by: Weiss Brothers
- Release date: November 15, 1924
- Running time: 50 minutes
- Country: United States
- Languages: Silent; English intertitles

Bringin' Home the Bacon is a 1924 American silent Western film directed by Richard Thorpe and starring Jay Wilsey, Jean Arthur and Bert Lindley.

== Cast ==
- Jay Wilsey as Bill Winton
- Jean Arthur as Nancy Norton
- Bert Lindley as Joe Breed
- Lafe McKee as Judge Simpson
- George F. Marion as Noel Simms
- Wilbur McGaugh as Jim Allen
- Victor King as Rastus
- Laura Miskin as Bertha Abernathy
- Frank Ellis as The Bandit

== Preservation ==
With no holdings located in archives, Bringin' Home the Bacon is considered a lost film.
