= Richard Thorpe =

American actor and film director (1896–1991)

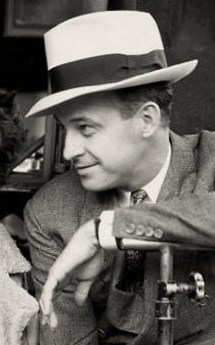
- Thorpe in 1934
- Born: Rollo Smolt Thorpe; February 24, 1896; Hutchinson, Kansas, U.S.
- Died: May 1, 1991 (aged 95); Palm Springs, California, U.S.
- Occupation: Film director
- Children: Jerry Thorpe

Richard Thorpe (born Rollo Smolt Thorpe; February 24, 1896 – May 1, 1991) was an American film director best known for his long career at Metro-Goldwyn-Mayer.

His obituary called him "a capable and versatile director willing to take on any assignment the studio handed him." He said "I just take them on as they come."

Thorpe also said "I'm happy to do any kind of picture. If there's a good script I think any director can make a good picture. Actually if it says in the script what you do, I don't see why anybody can't make it."

One associate said “He was a company man, a very pleasant, good-looking, nice, well-behaved guy who took pride in being efficient like some businessman would take pride in the way he ran his bank.”

His two favorite films were Night Must Fall (1937) and Two Girls and a Sailor (1944). "They were new and different experiences," said Thorpe.

For his contribution to the motion picture industry, Thorpe has a star on the Hollywood Walk of Fame at 6101 Hollywood Blvd. In 2003 a Golden Palm Star on the Palm Springs Walk of Stars in Palm Springs, California was dedicated to him and his son Jerry.

== Biography ==
Born Rollo Smolt Thorpe on February 24, 1896 in Hutchinson, Kansas, Richard Thorpe began his entertainment career performing in vaudeville and onstage. In 1921 he began in motion pictures as an actor and directed his first silent film in 1923. He went on to direct more than one hundred and eighty films.

He worked frequently at the Poverty Row studio Chesterfield Pictures during the 1930s.

=== MGM ===
Thorpe later estimated he "did 72 Westerns, four comedies, 12 serials and 36 independent productions before coming to Metro."

The first full-length motion picture he directed for MGM was Last of the Pagans (1935) starring Ray Mala. Thorpe was assigned to Tarzan Escapes which was a huge success as was Night Must Fall.

=== The Wizard of Oz ===
Thorpe is known as the original director of The Wizard of Oz (1939). He was fired after two weeks of shooting because it was felt that his scenes did not have the right air of fantasy about them. Thorpe notoriously gave Judy Garland a blonde wig and cutesy "baby-doll" makeup that made her look like a girl in her late teens rather than an innocent Kansas farm girl of about 13. Both makeup and wig were discarded at the suggestion of George Cukor, who was brought in temporarily. Stills from Thorpe's work on the film survive today. Further, it is understood that bits of his filmed footage of Toto escaping from the Wicked Witch's castle are featured in the film, albeit uncredited.

Thorpe was going to direct Kim with Mickey Rooney but the movie was cancelled.

Two Girls and a Sailor would be the first of eleven films Thorpe would make with producer Joe Pasternak. The film was a big hit and helped make a star of Van Johnson.

Thorpe made a number of films with Esther Williams, starting with Thrill of a Romance. She recalled, "He was nothing if not efficient, and I soon began to wonder if he hadn’t missed his calling as an accountant. He was cranky, especially in the morning, until he’d downed a pot of coffee; it was wise to keep your distance. Dick didn’t like people who were too cheerful, which meant that he took an instant dislike to me." Williams says Thorpe constantly bullied and berated her during filming although she says he stopped it after she left the set crying.

Williams says that while making Fiesta, Thorpe "was in a worse mood... than he’d been before. He hated Mexico; he hated bullfighting, and above all he hated Ricardo Montalban, who was at least as cheerful as I was." She did not want to make This Time for Keeps with Thorpe but the studio insisted.

Thorpe later said the only film he turned down at MGM was The Black Hand. “I didn’t think I could handle Gene Kelly because he had been a director. And after an hour and a half, Schary said, ‘Well, you go ahead and do it.’ So I went ahead and did it.”

=== Epics ===
At MGM, he teamed up with producer Pandro S. Berman, with whom he made Ivanhoe (1952). This was a huge commercial success (earning a DGA nomination for Thorpe) and led to a series of expensive epics produced by Berman, including The Prisoner of Zenda (1952), Knights of the Round Table (1953), All the Brothers Were Valiant (1953) and The Adventures of Quentin Durward (1955). Pandro Berman later called Thorpe "the most efficient director I ever knew in terms of things technical. The beauty of Thorpe was that if you had a script he liked, he just shot it."

Joan Fontaine, who starred in Ivanhoe later wrote "I found that director Thorpe cared more about the performance of the horses than the actors."

According to James Mason, when making The Prisoner of Zenda star Stewart Granger asked to do a second take. Thorpe refused, saying "You can’t improve things to an extent that represents value at the box office. In my experience I have found that if you print the first take which has a reasonable tempo and in which all the actors say their lines in a way that’s completely intelligible then there is no point in retaking it." Granger confirmed "If you remembered the lines and got through the scene, Richard would print it. He didn’t believe in ten or fifteen takes in order to catch some subtle difference only appreciated by the director. I loved working like this, and that’s the reason the film was made in such an incredibly short time."

Thorpe was noted for working quickly and efficiently—skills he had learned in the 1930s while working for low-budget Chesterfield Pictures. Freddie Young said "Dick Thorpe was the favorite director at MGM because he always finished on schedule. He made a point of it. The studio kept giving him a shorter and shorter schedule, but he always beat it." Young described Thorpe's "special method for working fast":

On Ivanhoe he'd start with a long shot and keep filming until one of the actors fluffed. 'Cut!' Then he'd move the camera to a closer set-up. 'Come on, let's go. Action!' And shoot on until the next hold-up. 'Move in closer still. Continue!' And so on until we finished up with just two big heads filling the screen. In other words, the close-ups in the finished film were quite arbitrary, depending on the pure chance of the interruptions in shooting on that particular day. Thorpe never reshot anything. That's how he beat the schedule. For a cameraman it was boring as hell.

Between the various camera angles, Thorpe shot enough footage to patch together into a completed sequence.

Thorpe also directed The Girl Who Had Everything (1951) with Elizabeth Taylor, and two musicals with Edmund Purdom, The Student Prince (1954) and Athena (1954). The Student Prince was originally meant to star Mario Lanza.

In 1957 Thorpe made two unsuccessful films, Tip on a Dead Jockey and Ten Thousand Bedrooms. The latter, Dean Martin's first film after breaking up with Jerry Lewis, was a flop. Thorpe followed these with the movie Jailhouse Rock, produced by Berman and starring Elvis Presley, which became a huge hit.

== Later career ==
Warwick Films borrowed Thorpe to make Killers of Kilimanjaro (1959) filmed in Britain and Kenya. He then made The House of the Seven Hawks (1959) with Robert Taylor in Europe.

Thorpe directed the epic The Tartars (1961) in Yugoslavia with Orson Welles, then filmed a popular romantic comedy The Honeymoon Machine (1961) with the team of Jim Hutton and Paula Prentiss, who were later featured in The Horizontal Lieutenant (1962). Prentiss was also in Follow the Boys (1963) shot in France. Thorpe was reunited with Elvis Presley for Fun in Acapulco (1963) at Paramount.

Thorpe made some films in Europe including The Truth About Spring (1965) with John and Hayley Mills. At Universal he directed That Funny Feeling (1965) with Sandra Dee and Bobby Darin.

After directing The Last Challenge in 1967, he retired from the film industry.

== Personal life and death ==
He was married to actress Belva McKay. They had a son, Jerry Thorpe (1925–2018). In 1959 a judge granted a divorce to his wife on the grounds of cruelty.

Thorpe died in Palm Springs, California on May 1, 1991, at Palm Springs Health Care Nursing facility of complications of old age.

== Critical appraisal ==
According to Scott Eyman Thorpe "was hardly ever anything but a by-the-numbers director, albeit a busy one: sixty-six films for MGM in thirty years. Metro tended to use Thorpe for maintenance work on ongoing series — four Tarzan films, two Lassies, a late Thin Man, a dozen musicals for Joe Pasternak, but never one for Arthur Freed. But he lasted longer than anybody at the studio, directing his last MGM film in 1967."

Another writer said "Thorpe had a reputation as an actor’s director and as a good technician who rarely wasted film, earning him the nickname “One-take Thorpe.”

Christopher Challis called him "a product of the old studio system [who] had become a director by faithfully adhering to the script with which he was presented. A sad, dour man, his life was dedicated to producing, without innovation, a verbatim representation on film of the approved script, which he felt duty-bound to complete on time and, if possible, under budget."

== Selected filmography ==
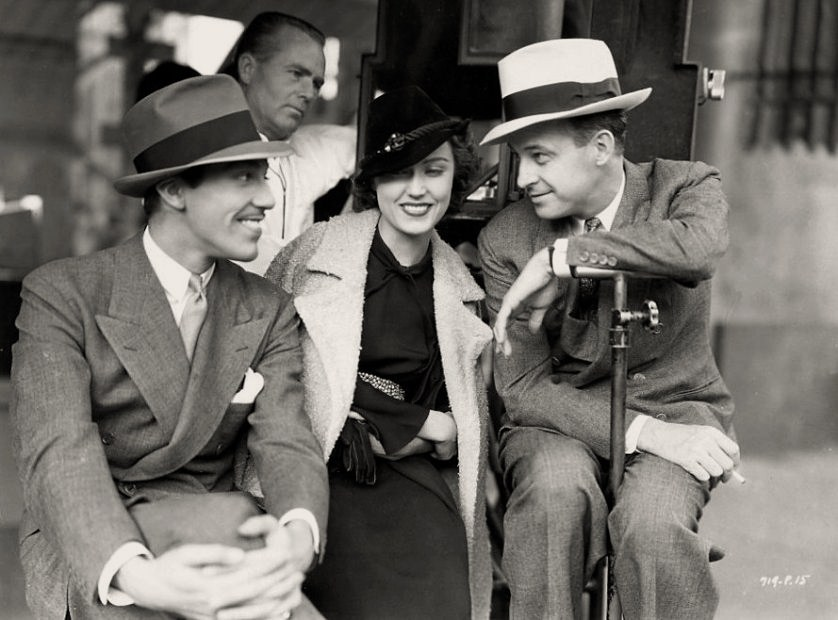
Cesar Romero, Fay Wray, director Richard Thorpe and cinematographer George Robinson (in background) on the set of Cheating Cheaters (1934)

As director

- Rough Ridin' (1924)
- Battling Buddy (1924)
- Bringin' Home the Bacon (1924)
- Thundering Romance (1924)
- Rarin' to Go (1924)
- The Desert Demon (1925)
- Double Action Daniels (1925)
- A Streak of Luck (1925)
- Galloping On (1925)
- The Saddle Cyclone (1925)
- Gold and Grit (1925)
- On the Go (1925)
- Tearin' Loose (1925)
- Fast Fightin' (1925)
- Double Daring (1926)
- The Bandit Buster (1926)
- The Bonanza Buckaroo (1926)
- College Days (1926)
- The Dangerous Dub (1926)
- The Twin Triggers (1926)
- Deuce High (1926)
- The Fighting Cheat (1926)
- Twisted Triggers (1926)
- Rawhide (1926)
- Between Dangers (1927)
- Tearin' Into Trouble (1927)
- Skedaddle Gold (1927)
- The Cyclone Cowboy (1927)
- Pals in Peril (1927)
- White Pebbles (1927)
- The Interferin' Gent (1927)
- The Ridin' Rowdy (1927)
- The Desert of the Lost (1927)
- Roarin' Broncs (1927)
- The First Night (1927)
- The Meddlin' Stranger (1927)
- Ride 'em High (1927)
- The Galloping Gobs (1927)
- The Obligin' Buckaroo (1927)
- Soda Water Cowboy (1927)
- The Cowboy Cavalier (1928)
- The Ballyhoo Buster (1928)
- The Flyin' Buckaroo (1928)
- Saddle Mates (1928)
- The Valley of Hunted Men (1928)
- Desperate Courage (1928)
- Vultures of the Sea (1928)
- The Vanishing West (1928)
- The Fatal Warning (1929)
- Border Romance (1929)
- The King of the Kongo (1929)
- The Utah Kid (1930)
- The Thoroughbred (1930)
- The Dude Wrangler (1930)
- Under Montana Skies (1930)
- Wings of Adventure (1930)
- The Lady from Nowhere (1931)
- The Lawless Woman (1931)
- Forgotten Women (1931)
- Slightly Married (1932)
- Murder at Dawn (1932)
- The Secrets of Wu Sin (1932)
- Women Won't Tell (1932)
- Cross-Examination (1932)
- Forbidden Company (1932)
- The King Murder (1932)
- Escapade (1932)
- Forgotten (1933)
- Notorious but Nice (1933)
- Love Is Dangerous (1933)
- Green Eyes (1934)
- Secret of the Chateau (1934)
- The Quitter (1934)
- Cheating Cheaters (1934) with Fay Wray
- Last of the Pagans (1935)
- Strange Wives (1935)
- Tarzan Escapes (1936) with Johnny Weissmuller and Maureen O'Sullivan
- Night Must Fall (1937) with Robert Montgomery and Rosalind Russell
- Dangerous Number (1937) with Ann Sothern and Robert Young
- Man-Proof (1938) with Myrna Loy, Franchot Tone, Rosalind Russell, and Walter Pidgeon
- The Toy Wife (1938) with Luise Rainer and Melvyn Douglas
- Love Is a Headache (1938) with Franchot Tone
- The Crowd Roars (1938) with Robert Taylor, Edward Arnold, Frank Morgan, and Maureen O'Sullivan
- The Adventures of Huckleberry Finn (1939) with Mickey Rooney, Walter Connolly, and William Frawley
- 20 Mule Team (1940) with Wallace Beery
- Wyoming (1940) with Wallace Beery
- The Earl of Chicago (1940) with Robert Montgomery
- Barnacle Bill (1941) with Wallace Beery
- The Bad Man (1941) with Wallace Beery, Lionel Barrymore, Laraine Day, and Ronald Reagan
- Tarzan's New York Adventure (1942) with Johnny Weissmuller and Maureen O'Sullivan
- White Cargo (1942) with Hedy Lamarr as Tondelayo
- Above Suspicion (1943) with Joan Crawford and Fred MacMurray
- Two Girls and a Sailor (1944) with Van Johnson and June Allyson
- The Thin Man Goes Home (1945) with William Powell and Myrna Loy
- Thrill of a Romance (1945) with Esther Williams
- Her Highness and the Bellboy (1945) with Hedy Lamarr and Robert Walker
- Fiesta (1947) with Esther Williams and Ricardo Montalbán
- This Time for Keeps (1947) with Esther Williams and Jimmy Durante
- On an Island with You (1948) with Esther Williams, Peter Lawford, and Jimmy Durante
- A Date with Judy (1948) with Wallace Beery, Jane Powell, and Elizabeth Taylor
- Malaya (1949) with Spencer Tracy and James Stewart
- Big Jack (1949) with Wallace Beery, Richard Conte, Marjorie Main, and Edward Arnold
- Challenge to Lassie (1949) with Donald Crisp and Alan Napier
- Black Hand (1950) with Gene Kelly
- Three Little Words (1950) with Fred Astaire and Red Skelton
- The Great Caruso (1951) with Mario Lanza and Ann Blyth
- The Unknown Man (1951) with Walter Pidgeon
- Vengeance Valley (1951) with Burt Lancaster
- Carbine Williams (1952) with James Stewart
- Ivanhoe (1952) with Robert Taylor, Elizabeth Taylor, and Joan Fontaine
- The Prisoner of Zenda (1952) with Stewart Granger, Deborah Kerr, and James Mason
- The Girl Who Had Everything (1953) with Elizabeth Taylor, Fernando Lamas, and William Powell
- Knights of the Round Table (1953) with Robert Taylor and Ava Gardner
- All the Brothers Were Valiant (1953) with Robert Taylor and Stewart Granger
- Athena (1954) with Jane Powell and Debbie Reynolds
- The Student Prince (1954), based on the famous operetta, with Ann Blyth, Edmund Purdom, and the singing voice of Mario Lanza.
- The Adventures of Quentin Durward (1955) with Robert Taylor and Robert Morley
- Tip on a Dead Jockey (1957) with Robert Taylor and Dorothy Malone
- Ten Thousand Bedrooms (1957) with Dean Martin (Martin's first non-Martin and Lewis movie)
- Jailhouse Rock (1957) with Elvis Presley
- Killers of Kilimanjaro (1959) with Robert Taylor and Anthony Newley
- The House of the Seven Hawks (1959) with Robert Taylor
- The Honeymoon Machine (1961) with Steve McQueen
- The Tartars (Italian, 1961) with Orson Welles and Victor Mature
- The Horizontal Lieutenant (1962) with Jim Hutton and Paula Prentiss
- Follow the Boys (1963) with Paula Prentiss
- Fun in Acapulco (1963) with Elvis Presley and Ursula Andress
- The Golden Head (1964) with George Sanders and Buddy Hackett
- The Truth About Spring (1964) with Hayley Mills
- That Funny Feeling (1965) with Sandra Dee, Bobby Darin, and Donald O'Connor
- The Last Challenge (1967) with Glenn Ford and Angie Dickinson
- The Scorpio Letters (1967, TV film) with Alex Cord and Shirley Eaton

== Notes ==
- Harmetz, Aljean (1977). The making of the wizard of oz.
- Thorpe, Richard (6 January 1954). "Talent Can't Complain; Bush League Or Backwoods, H'wood Seeks It Out". Variety. p. 45.
