= Betty Baker =

American writer

Betty Lou Baker
- Born: June 20, 1928; Bloomsburg, Pennsylvania
- Died: November 6, 1987 (aged 59); Tucson, Arizona
- Occupation: Novelist
- Writing career
- Language: English
- Years active: 1962–1984
- Genres: historical fiction, young adult literature
- Notable awards: Western Heritage Award (1964, 1971), Spur Award (1968)

Betty Lou Baker (1928-1987) was an American writer of young adult literature, who specialized in historical novels about the Southwestern United States. "The best of her books display a remarkable sensitivity to and appreciation of Native peoples and cultures".

== Life ==
Betty Lou Baker was born in Bloomsburg, Pennsylvania, on June 20, 1928, the daughter of Robert Weidler Baker and Mary Baker, née Wentling. She attended school in Orange, New Jersey. In 1947 she married Robert George Venturo.

Baker wrote her first novel, Little Runner of the Longhouse (1962), for her son, Christopher, inspired by a boring school history book to try to write something more engaging.

Baker and Venturo divorced in 1965. She continued to write, training herself to write at least five thousand words a day.

Baker won the Western Heritage Award in 1964 and 1971, and the Spur Award of the Western Writers of America in 1968.

She died November 6, 1987, in Tucson, Arizona. Her papers are held by UCLA Special Collections.

== Works ==
Novels

- Little Runner of the Longhouse. New York: Harper, 1962. Illustrated by Arnold Lobel.
- The Sun's Promise. New York: Abelard-Schuman, 1962. Illustrated by Juliette Palmer
- Killer-Of-Death. New York: Harper, 1963. Illustrated by John Kaufmann.
- The Shaman's Last Raid. New York: Harper, 1963. Illustrated by Leonard Shortall.
- The Treasure of the Padres. New York: Harper & Row, 1964. Illustrated by Leonard Shortall.
- Walk the World's Rim. New York: Harper, 1965.
- The Blood of the Brave. New York: Harper, 1966.
- The Dunderhead War. New York: Harper, 1967.
- Do Not Annoy the Indians. New York: Macmillan, 1968. Illustrated by Harold Goodwin.
- And One Was a Wooden Indian. New York: Macmillan, 1970.
- A Stranger and Afraid. New York: Macmillan, 1972.
- The Big Push. New York: Coward, 1972. Illustrated by Bonnie Johnson.
- The Spirit is Willing. New York: Macmillan, 1974.
- Dupper. New York: Greenwillow, 1976. Illustrated by Chuck Eckart.
- The Great Desert Race. New York: Macmillan, 1980.

Non-fiction

- Settlers and Strangers: Native Americans of the Desert Southwest and History as They Saw It. 1977.
