= Violet La Plante =

American actress (1908–1984)

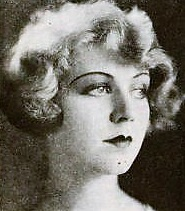
- La Plante ca. 1925
- Born: Violet Laplante; January 17, 1908; St. Louis, Missouri, U.S.
- Died: June 1, 1984 (aged 76); La Jolla, California, U.S.
- Occupation: Actress
- Years active: 1924–1928
- Relatives: Laura La Plante (sister)

Violet La Plante (born Violet Laplante; January 17, 1908 – June 1, 1984), also known as Violet Avon, was an American silent film actress.

== Biography ==
Violet La Plante, born in Missouri, was the younger sister of future Hollywood star Laura La Plante, and started acting in the early 1920s, adapting her surname to "La Plante", like her sister.

Her first film was in 1924, starring opposite Buddy Roosevelt, in Battling Buddy. She starred in four films in 1924. The following year, she made just one film, but was included in the WAMPAS Baby Stars (at the time, baby star was common slang for starlet). Her sister Laura was a 1923 WAMPAS Baby Stars.

Despite the title as a WAMPAS Baby Star, she never achieved the same level of success as her sister. In 1926 and 1927, she starred in only one film for each year, then in 1928 she had only two films. Her career ended before the advent of sound films, and her last role was in the 1928 film How to Handle Women.

She died in La Jolla, California, on June 1, 1984, aged 76.

== Partial filmography ==
- The Clean Heart (1924)
- Battling Buddy (1924)
- Walloping Wallace (1924)
- The Hurricane Kid (1925)
- The Ramblin' Galoot (1926)
- How to Handle Women (1928)
