= 13 Washington Square =

1928 film

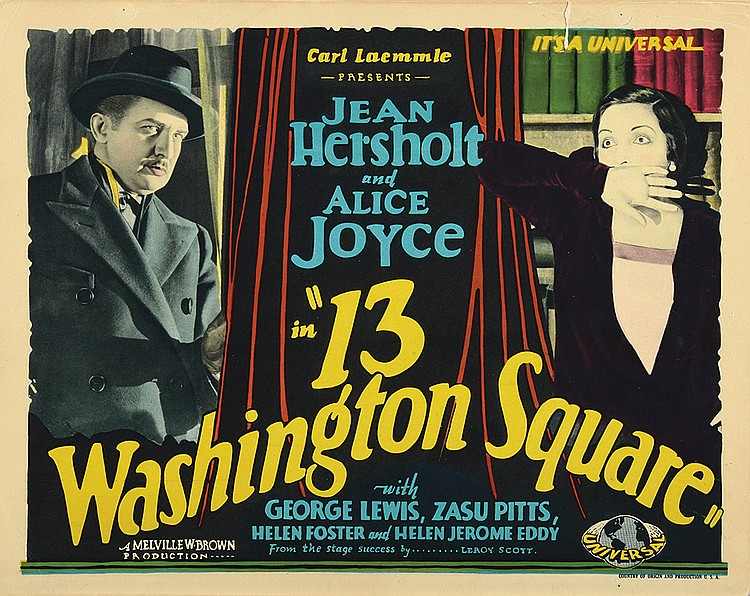
- Lobby card
- Directed by: Melville W. Brown
- Written by: Harry O. Hoyt (adaptation); Walter Anthony
- Based on: No. 13 Washington Square by Leroy Scott
- Produced by: Carl Laemmle
- Starring: Jean Hersholt; Alice Joyce; George J. Lewis
- Cinematography: John Stumar
- Edited by: Ray Curtiss
- Distributed by: Universal Pictures
- Release date: April 8, 1928
- Running time: 70 minutes
- Country: United States
- Language: Silent (English intertitles)

13 Washington Square (1928)

13 Washington Square is a 1928 American silent romantic comedy drama film directed by Melville W. Brown, written by Harry O. Hoyt and Walter Anthony, and starring Jean Hersholt, Alice Joyce, and George J. Lewis. It is based on a 1914 play No. 13 Washington Square by Leroy Scott. The film was released on April 8, 1928, by Universal Pictures.

== Plot ==
As described in a film magazine, Mrs. de Peyster plans a trip to Europe with her son, Jack, hoping to break up a marriage between him and Mary Morgan, a grocer's daughter. When Jack brings Mary to meet his aristocratic mother, she refuses to see the young woman. Jack decides to abandon the trip and marry Mary at once. On reaching the steamer, Mrs. de Peyster realizes that Jack does not intend to accompany her. Hoping to avoid newspaper reporters and to stop her son's marriage, she exchanges clothes with her devoted cousin, who is in less fortunate circumstances. The cousin sails in her place and Mrs. de Peyster, with her maid, who poses as her sister, goes to cousin Olivetta's boarding house. Deacon Pyecroft, a picture thief, who is planning to rob the de Peyster home, lives in the boarding house. When he meets Mrs. de Peyster and her maid, he mistakes them for fellow crooks and tries to make a deal with them. The terrified Mrs. de Peyster departs for her closed house, 13 Washington Square, as soon as night falls. Jack and Mary, on their way to be married, stop at 13 Washington Square to pick up some of Jack's clothes. Deacon Pyecroft, thinking the coast is clear, also goes to 13 Washington Square. Many terrifying and ludicrous situations develop in different parts of the house before all is resolved.

== Cast ==
- Jean Hersholt as 'Deacon' Pyecroft
- Alice Joyce as Mrs. de Peyster
- George J. Lewis as Jack De Peyster
- ZaSu Pitts as Mathilde
- Helen Foster as Mary Morgan
- Helen Jerome Eddy as Olivetta
- Julia Swayne Gordon as Mrs. Allistair
- Jack McDonald as Mayfair
- Jerry Gamble as Sparks

== Preservation ==
A copy of 13 Washington Square is housed at UCLA Film and Television Archive and the Library of Congress.
