= Voices of the City =

1921 film

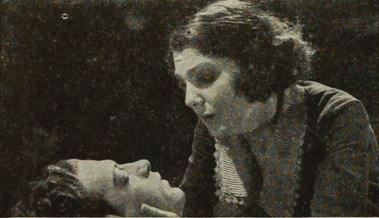
- Film still published in Photoplay
- Directed by: Wallace Worsley
- Written by: Arthur F. Statter
- Story by: Leroy Scott
- Starring: Lon Chaney; Leatrice Joy
- Distributed by: Goldwyn Pictures
- Release date: December 1921
- Running time: 60 minutes
- Country: United States
- Language: Silent (English intertitles)
- Budget: $200,000

Voices of the City (also known as The Night Rose, its intended original release title) is a 1921 American silent crime drama film starring Leatrice Joy and Lon Chaney that was directed by Wallace Worsley, based on the Leroy Scott novel The Night Rose. The film took more than 9 months to be released due to a controversy over the proposed title and the film's abundance of gunplay. The film was retitled Voices of the City and was only released in December 1921, although it had been completed in early March. The film is still listed under The Night Rose in some reference sources.

The ball sequence involved 300 couples and took five days to film. It is considered a lost film today. A still exists showing Chaney as the gangster, Red O'Rourke.

== Plot ==
While at the seedy Blue Jay cafe in San Francisco with her sweetheart Jimmy Halloran, Georgia Rodman is a witness to the murder of a policeman by Red O'Rourke's gang. Georgia and Jimmy are regarded as accessories to the slaying and begin looking for them to question them. Georgia's mother throws her out of her house for consorting with lowlifes. Offering to hide the couple, Red O'Rourke actually plans to kill Jimmy so he can't testify against him. O'Rourke tells Georgia the police are looking for her so that she remains hidden during the day. She becomes known as the "Night Rose" because she only comes out at night, wearing a veil.

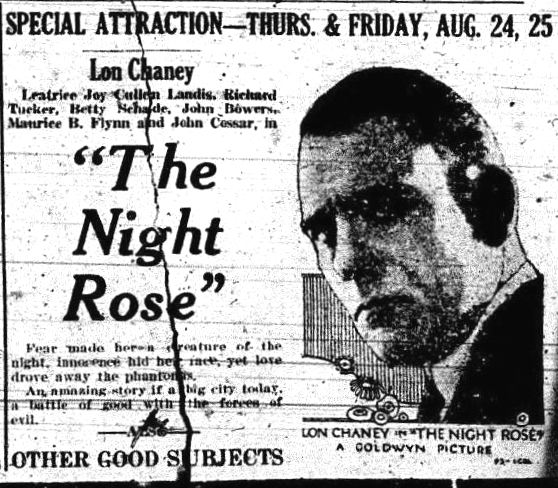
Advertisement

O'Rourke's girlfriend Sally Monroe becomes jealous when she learns that O'Rourke is trying to convince Georgia to marry him. She tells Georgia that O'Rourke is treacherous and plotting to kill Jimmy at a local ball organized by O'Rourke, where he intends to marry Georgia. Jimmy is tricked into going to Black Mike's Cafe, where one of O'Rourke's men shoots him. Believing Jimmy to be dead, Georgia decides to seek vengeance.

Georgia pulls a gun on O'Rourke at the ball while they are dancing. Just as she is about to shoot him, Sally grabs the pistol out of her hand and fires the fatal shot. Georgia's mother forgives her and welcomes her back, and upon her return, Georgia finds Jimmy recovering at her mother's home.

== Cast ==
- Leatrice Joy as Georgia Rodman
- Lon Chaney as O'Rourke / Duke McGee
- John Bowers as Graham
- Cullen Landis as Jimmy
- Richard Tucker as Clancy
- Mary Warren as Mary Rodman
- Edythe Chapman as Mrs. Rodman
- Betty Schade as Sally
- Maurice B. "Lefty" Flynn as Pierson
- Milton Ross as Courey
- John Cossar as Garrison

== Controversial Release ==
In 1921 when The Night Rose was released, many American cities and states had enacted their own film censorship laws. Because of its crime plot, The Night Rose was subjected to censorship, and was the first film rejected in whole by the recently created New York State Motion Picture Commission which it condemned "as highly immoral and of such character that its exhibition would not only tend to corrupt morals, but to incite crime." Goldwyn appealed the decision to New York state court, which upheld the commission's decision on November 18, 1921. Goldwyn then came to an agreement with the state commission to edit the film, which removed many of Lon Chaney's scenes and inexplicably changed the name of his character from Red O'Rourke to Duke McGee. The film was finally released in December 1921 under the title Voices of the City.

== Critiques ==
"Interesting underworld melodrama with intricate plotting and counter-plotting by a master criminal and an abundance of gun play...Lon Chaney, as always, gets the utmost out of the role of a powerful leader of lawbreakers. He has a gift for quiet emphasis in pantomime which fits nicely into this lurid tale." ---Variety

"It is not a particularly convincing sort of story and the continuity is rather ragged in spots. Lon Chaney plays his part of the gang chief with his usual energy and ability to invest such roles with a species of sinister fascination." ---Exhibitors Trade Review

"With some changes in the subtitles and the necessary cuts, plus a new main title, the picture is being shown at the Capitol. Through the process (of censorship), the story has become somewhat disjointed and illogical as well as hard to follow. Lon Chaney has done much better things than this." ---Film Daily
