= Nothing Shall Be Hidden =

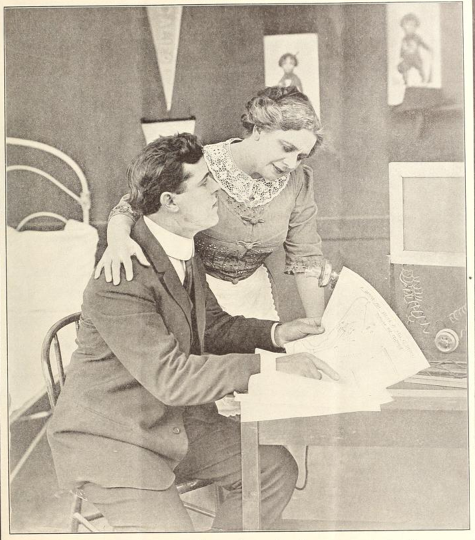
- Film still featured in The Implet, 1912
- Directed by: Harry A. Pollard
- Written by: Lillian Winbigler
- Produced by: Carl Laemmle; Independent Moving Pictures
- Starring: Harry A. Pollard; Margarita Fischer
- Distributed by: Motion Picture Distributors and Sales Company
- Release date: June 10, 1912
- Running time: 300 m (1 reel)
- Country: United States
- Languages: Silent; English intertitles

Nothing Shall Be Hidden is a 1912 American silent drama film. It was produced by the Independent Moving Pictures (IMP) Company of New York and is the earliest-known directorial effort of Harry A. Pollard, who also costars in the production with Margarita Fischer.
