= Behold This Woman =

1924 film directed by J. Stuart Blackton

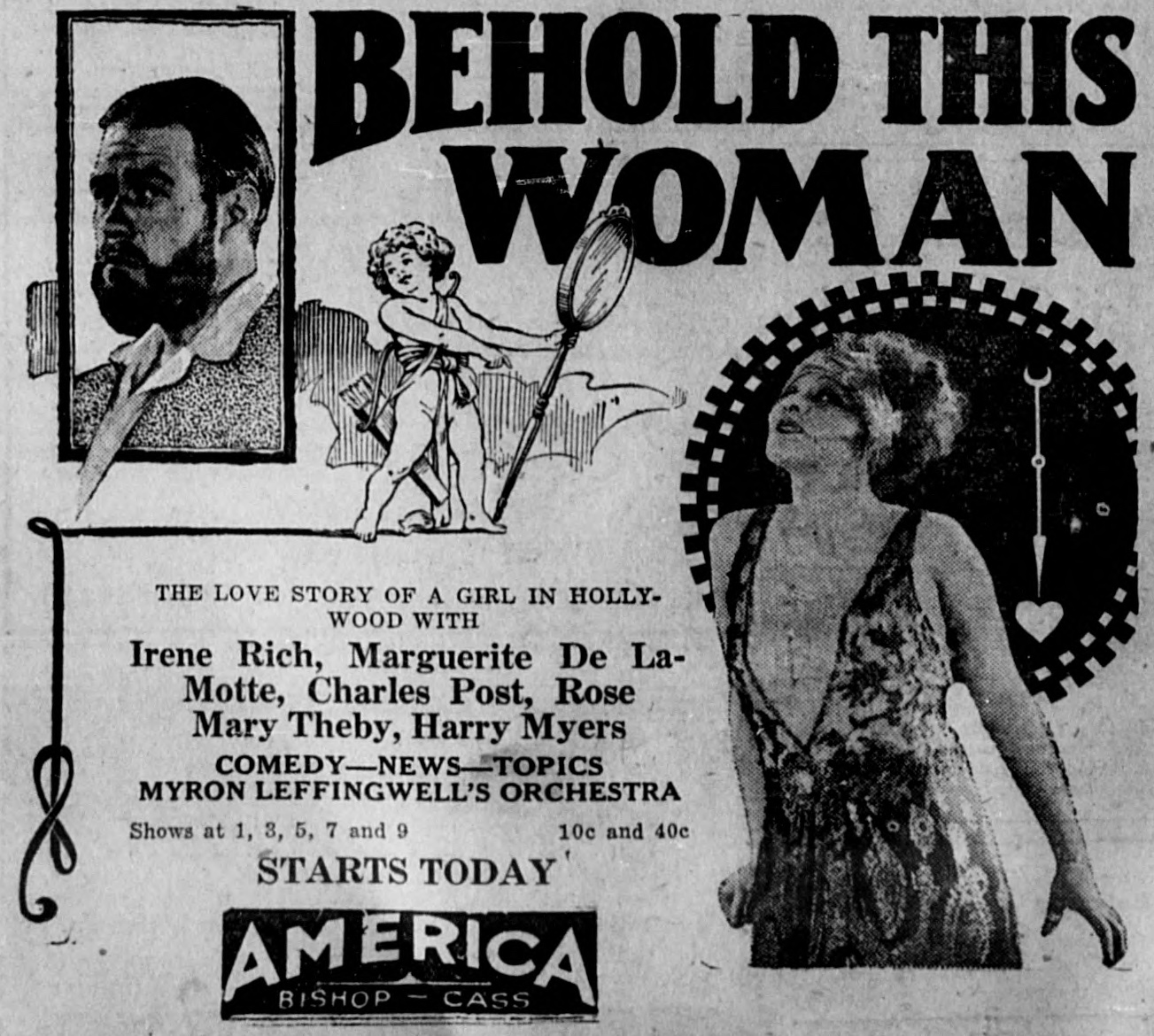
- Newspaper advertisement
- Directed by: J. Stuart Blackton
- Written by: Marian Constance Blackton
- Produced by: J. Stuart Blackton; Albert E. Smith
- Starring: Irene Rich; Marguerite De La Motte; Charles A. Post
- Cinematography: L. William O'Connell; Ernest F. Smith
- Production company: Vitagraph Studios
- Distributed by: Vitagraph Studios
- Release date: August 3, 1924
- Running time: 70 minutes
- Country: United States
- Languages: Silent; English intertitles

Behold This Woman is a 1924 American silent drama film directed by J. Stuart Blackton and starring Irene Rich, Marguerite De La Motte and Charles A. Post.

== Cast ==
- Irene Rich as Louise Maurel
- Marguerite De La Motte as Sophie
- Charles A. Post as John Strangeway
- Harry Myers as Eugene de Seyre
- Rosemary Theby as Calavera
- Anders Randolf as Stephen Strangeway

== Preservation status ==
- An abridged or shortened version of the film is held by a collector.

== Bibliography ==
- Munden, Kenneth White. The American Film Institute Catalog of Motion Pictures Produced in the United States, Part 1. University of California Press, 1997.
