= The Pest (1919 film) =

1919 film

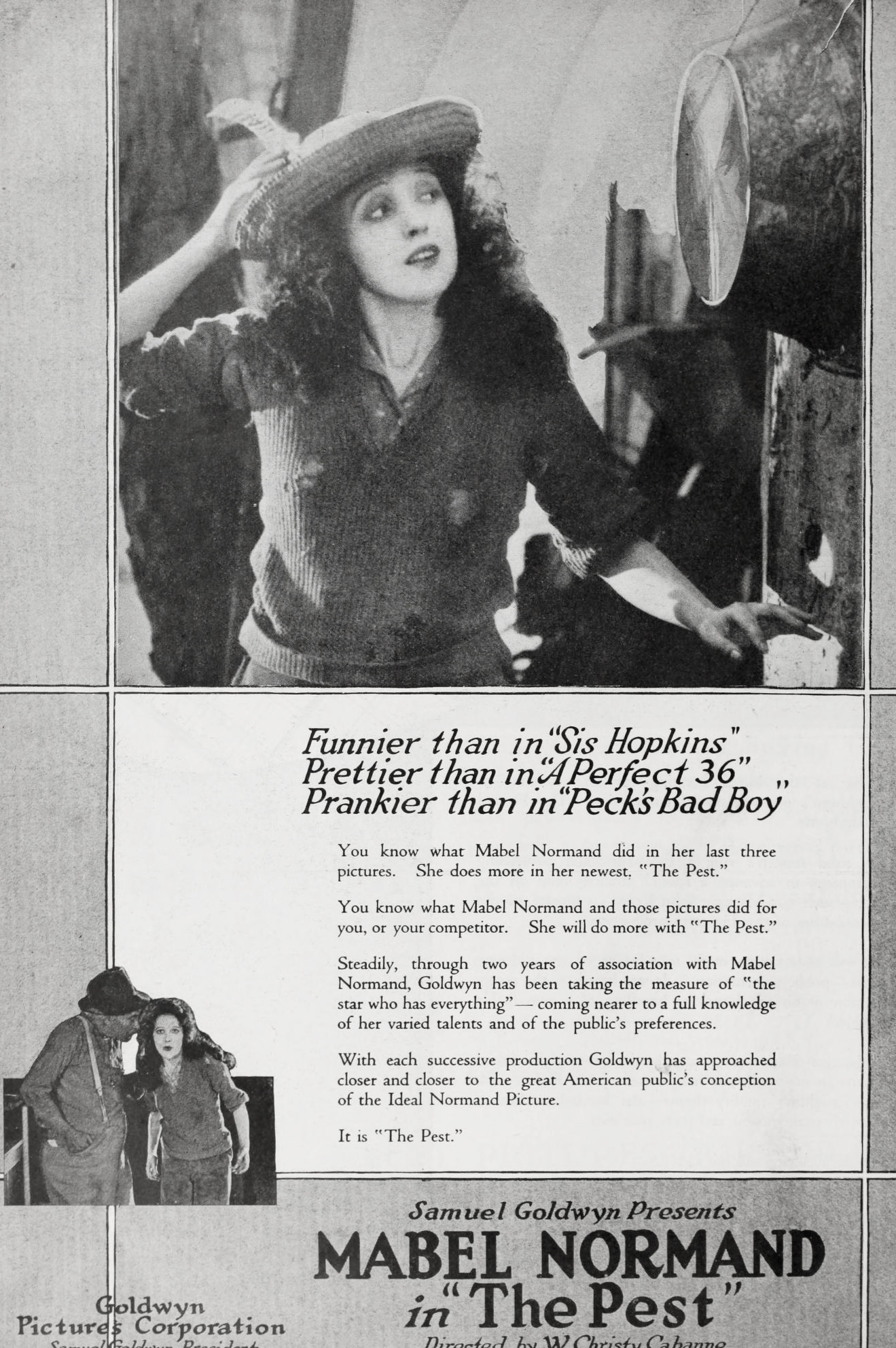
- Directed by: Christy Cabanne
- Written by: Melville W. Brown
- Produced by: Samuel Goldwyn
- Starring: Mabel Normand; John Bowers; Charles K. Gerrard
- Cinematography: Percy Hilburn(*Fr)
- Production company: Goldwyn Pictures
- Release date: April 20, 1919 (US)
- Running time: 5 reels
- Country: United States
- Language: English

The Pest is a lost 1919 silent American comedy-drama film directed by Christy Cabanne, starring Mabel Normand, John Bowers, and Charles K. Gerrard, and released on April 20, 1919.

== Cast ==
- Mabel Normand as Jigs
- John Bowers as Gene Giles
- Charles K. Gerard as John Harland
- Alec B. Francis as Judge Fisher
- Leota Lorraine as Blanche Fisher
- Jack Curtis as Asher Blodgett
- Pearl Elmore as Amy Blodgett
- James Bradbury as "Noisy" Wilson
- Vera Lewis as Housekeeper
