= Circle Canyon =

1933 film

- Directed by: Victor Adamson
- Written by: Burl R. Tuttle; Victor Adamson
- Produced by: Victor Adamson
- Starring: Buddy Roosevelt; June Mathews; Clarissa Woods
- Cinematography: Bert Longenecker
- Edited by: Frances Burroughs
- Production company: Victor Adamson Productions
- Distributed by: Superior Talking Pictures
- Release date: 1933
- Running time: 48 minutes
- Country: United States
- Language: English

Circle Canyon is a 1933 American Western film directed by Victor Adamson and starring Buddy Roosevelt, June Mathews and Clarissa Woods.

== Cast ==
- Buddy Roosevelt as Chris Morell
- June Mathews as Clara Moore
- Clarissa Woods as Lucy Morrell
- John Tyke as Jim - Clara's Nephew
- Allen Holbrook as Vic Byrd
- Harry Leland as Mat
- George Hazel as Sam Black
- Clyde McClary as Pete - Henchman
- Mark Hamson as Tom - Lucy's Father
- Ernest Scott as Henchman
- Victor Adamson as Express Agent
- William McCall as Deputy
- Bud Osborne as Sheriff

== Bibliography ==
- Michael R. Pitts. Poverty Row Studios, 1929–1940: An Illustrated History of 55 Independent Film Companies, with a Filmography for Each. McFarland & Company, 2005.
