= The Clean Heart =

1924 film

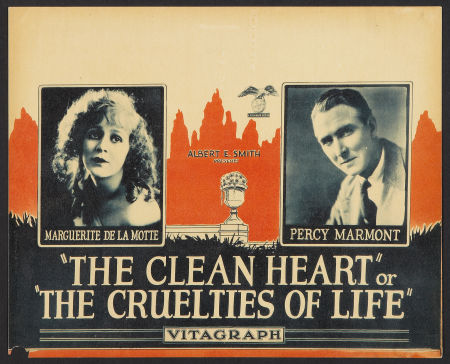
- Directed by: J. Stuart Blackton
- Written by: Marian Constance Blackton; A.S.M. Hutchinson (novel)
- Produced by: Albert E. Smith
- Starring: Percy Marmont; Otis Harlan; Marguerite De La Motte
- Cinematography: W. Steve Smith Jr.
- Production company: Vitagraph Studios
- Distributed by: Vitagraph Studios
- Release date: September 15, 1924
- Running time: 80 minutes
- Country: United States
- Languages: Silent; English intertitles

The Clean Heart is a 1924 American silent drama film directed by J. Stuart Blackton and starring Percy Marmont, Otis Harlan and Marguerite De La Motte.

== Cast ==
- Percy Marmont as Philip Wriford
- Otis Harlan as Puddlebox
- Marguerite De La Motte as Essie Bickers
- Andrew Arbuckle as Bickers
- Martha Petelle as Mrs. Bickers
- Violet La Plante as Brida
- George Ingleton
- Anna Lockhardt

== Bibliography ==
- Munden, Kenneth White. The American Film Institute Catalog of Motion Pictures Produced in the United States, Part 1. University of California Press, 1997.
