= Home, James (1928 film) =

1928 film

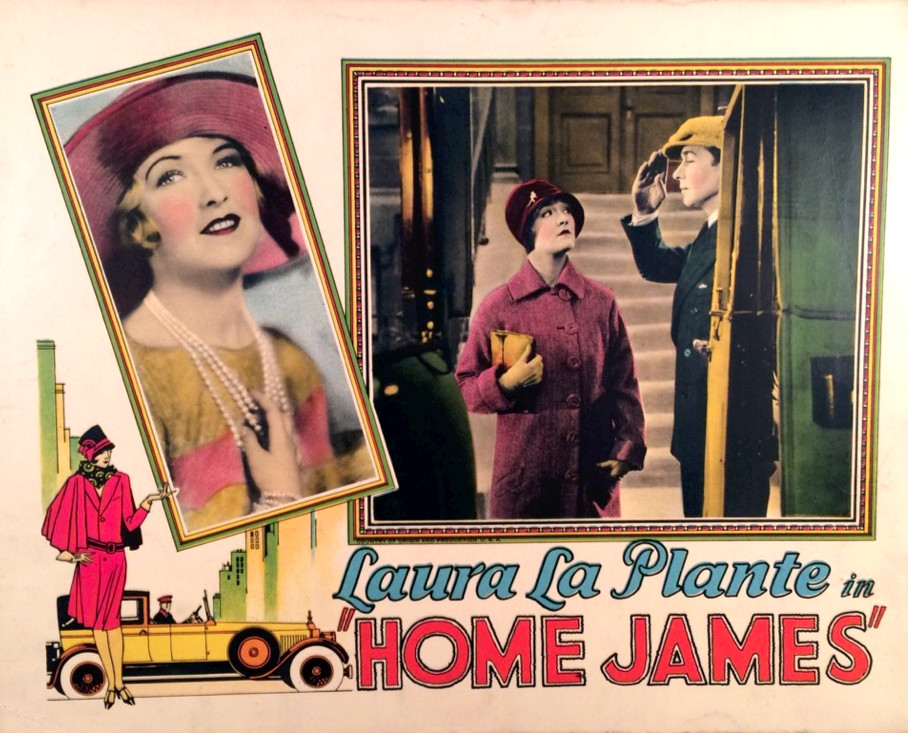
- Lobby card
- Directed by: William Beaudine
- Written by: Mort Blumenstock (scenario); Albert DeMond (titles); Joseph F. Poland (story supervisor)
- Story by: Gladys Johnson
- Starring: Laura La Plante
- Cinematography: John Stumar
- Distributed by: Universal Pictures
- Release date: September 2, 1928
- Running time: 70 minutes
- Country: United States
- Language: Silent (English intertitles)

Home, James is a 1928 American silent comedy film directed by William Beaudine starring Laura La Plante.

== Cast ==
- Laura La Plante as Laura Elliot
- Charles Delaney as James Lacey Jr
- Aileen Manning as Mrs. Elliot
- Joan Standing as Iris Elliot
- George C. Pearce as James Lacey Sr
- Arthur Hoyt as William Waller (floorwalker)
- Sidney Bracey as Haskins (the butler)

== Preservation ==
A print of Home, James is a preserved in the film collections of the UCLA Film & Television Archive and Cinematheque Royale de Belgique, Brussels.
