= The Loaded Door =

1922 film

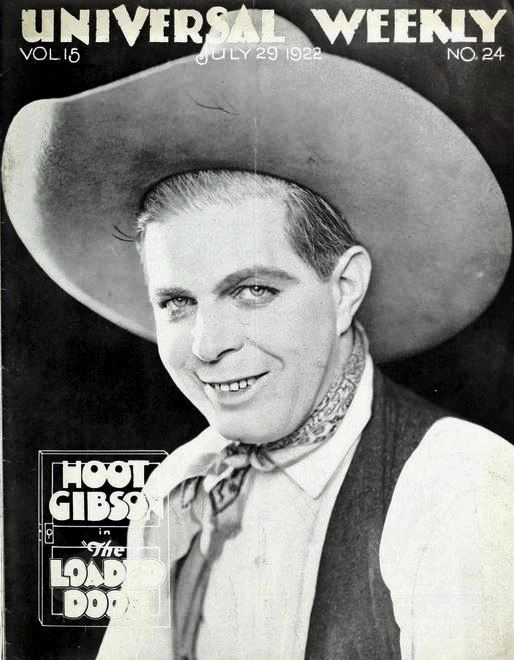
- Film still used as publication cover
- Directed by: Harry A. Pollard
- Written by: Ralph Cummins; George Hively
- Starring: Hoot Gibson
- Cinematography: Sol Polito
- Distributed by: Universal Film Manufacturing Company
- Release date: August 4, 1922
- Running time: 50 minutes
- Country: United States
- Languages: Silent; English intertitles

The Loaded Door is a 1922 American silent Western film directed by Harry A. Pollard and starring Hoot Gibson. It was adapted for the screen by George Hively based on the short story "Cherub of Seven Bar" by Ralph Cummmins, which originally appeared in Short Stories Magazine in 1921.

== Plot ==
As described in a studio publication, Bert Lyons returns to his ranch to discover his foreman dead and the ranch leased to a real estate shark. The new hands seem to be trafficking in booze and narcotics under the guise of raising cattle. He goes to see his sweetheart Molly Grainger who shares her suspicions. The smugglers do not care for Bert's curiosity and plan to "get him." The new boss of the ranch has designs on Molly, and tells her that he will assist in freeing her brother Joe, who is in prison charged with murder, if she goes with him across the border. Bert learns of this ruse, tricks the smugglers, and rides to Molly's rescue. The smugglers are rounded up, and Joe is freed, leaving Bert and Molly to plan their new home.

== Cast ==
- Hoot Gibson as Bert Lyons
- Gertrude Olmstead as Molly Grainger
- William Ryno as Bud Grainger (credited as Bill Ryno)
- A. Edward Sutherland as Joe Grainger (credited as Eddie Sutherland)
- Noble Johnson as Blackie Lopez
- Joe Harris as Stan Calvert (credited as Joseph Harris)
- Charles Newton as Dad Stewart
- Charles Smiley as Purdy (credited as Charles A. Smiley)
- Victor Potel as Slim
- C.L. Sherwood as Fatty

== Preservation ==
The Loaded Door is currently presumed lost. In February of 2021, the film was cited by the National Film Preservation Board on their Lost U.S. Silent Feature Films list.

== See also ==
- Hoot Gibson filmography
