= Battling Buddy =

1924 film

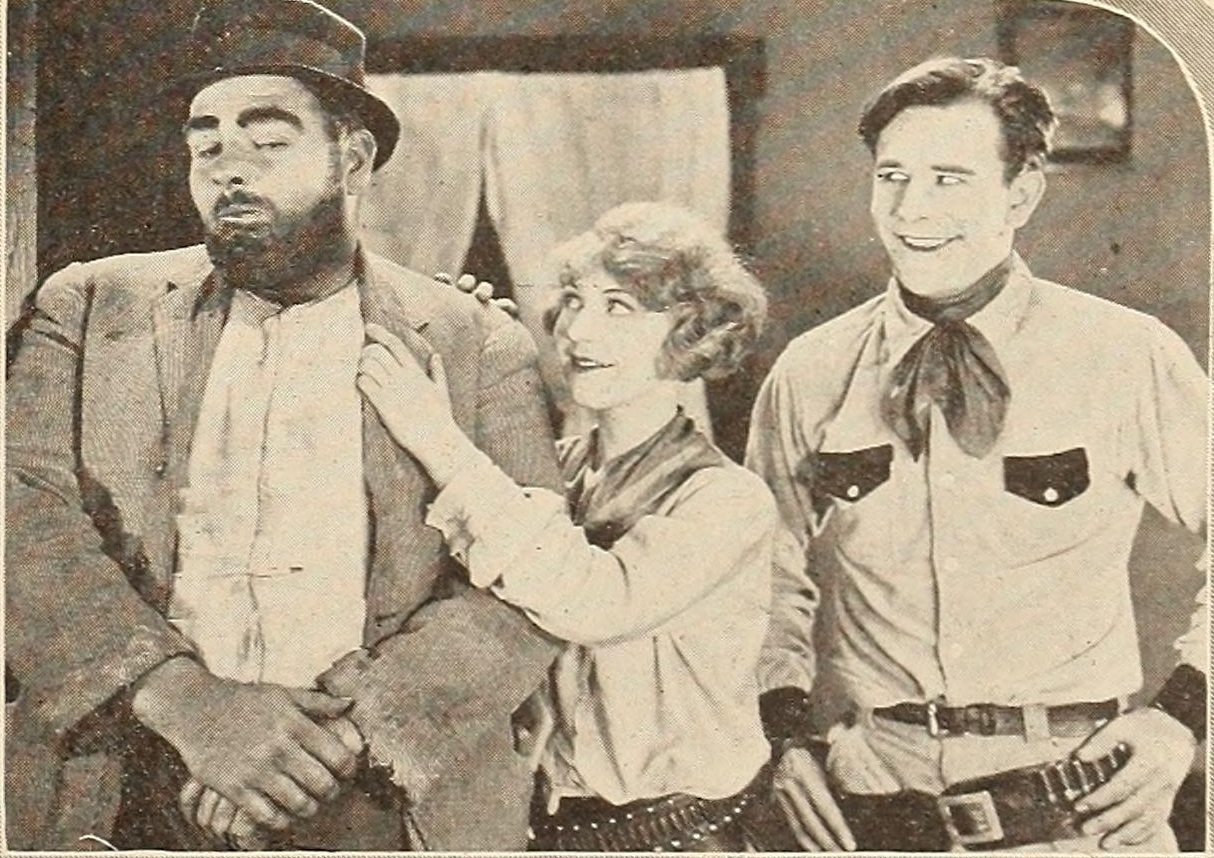
- Directed by: Richard Thorpe
- Written by: Betty Burbridge
- Produced by: Lester F. Scott Jr. Louis Weiss
- Starring: Buddy Roosevelt; Violet La Plante; William Lowery
- Cinematography: George Meehan
- Production company: Approved Pictures
- Distributed by: Weiss Brothers
- Release date: September 14, 1924
- Running time: 50 minutes
- Country: United States
- Languages: Silent; English intertitles

Battling Buddy is a 1924 American silent Western film directed by Richard Thorpe and starring Buddy Roosevelt, Violet La Plante and William Lowery.

== Plot ==
According to a film magazine, "Dorothy Parker, the adopted daughter of a ranch owner, Daniel West, is bequeathed a half share of the ranch. The other half goes to his nephew, Buddy West, who has been away for years. The will had a provision, however, that if the nephew proved incompetent of running the ranch, his share was to go to Pete Hall, the foreman. Pete means to get his share, and has Buddy put in a sanitarium for the insane, as incompetent. Here Buddy's roommate is Ginger, a good-natured tramp. Together they contrive their escape. The boys return to the ranch, and though their cabin is burned while Dorothy is in it, Buddy rescues her, giving Hall the thrashing of his life, and orders Hall and his men off the ranch."

== Cast ==
- Buddy Roosevelt as Buddy West
- Violet La Plante as Dorothy Parker
- William Lowery as Pete Hall
- Kewpie King as Ginger
- N.E. Hendrix as Fred Burrows
- Charles E. Butler as Sam White

== Preservation ==
With no holdings located in archives, Battling Buddy is considered a lost film.
