= Marian Constance Blackton =

American screenwriter

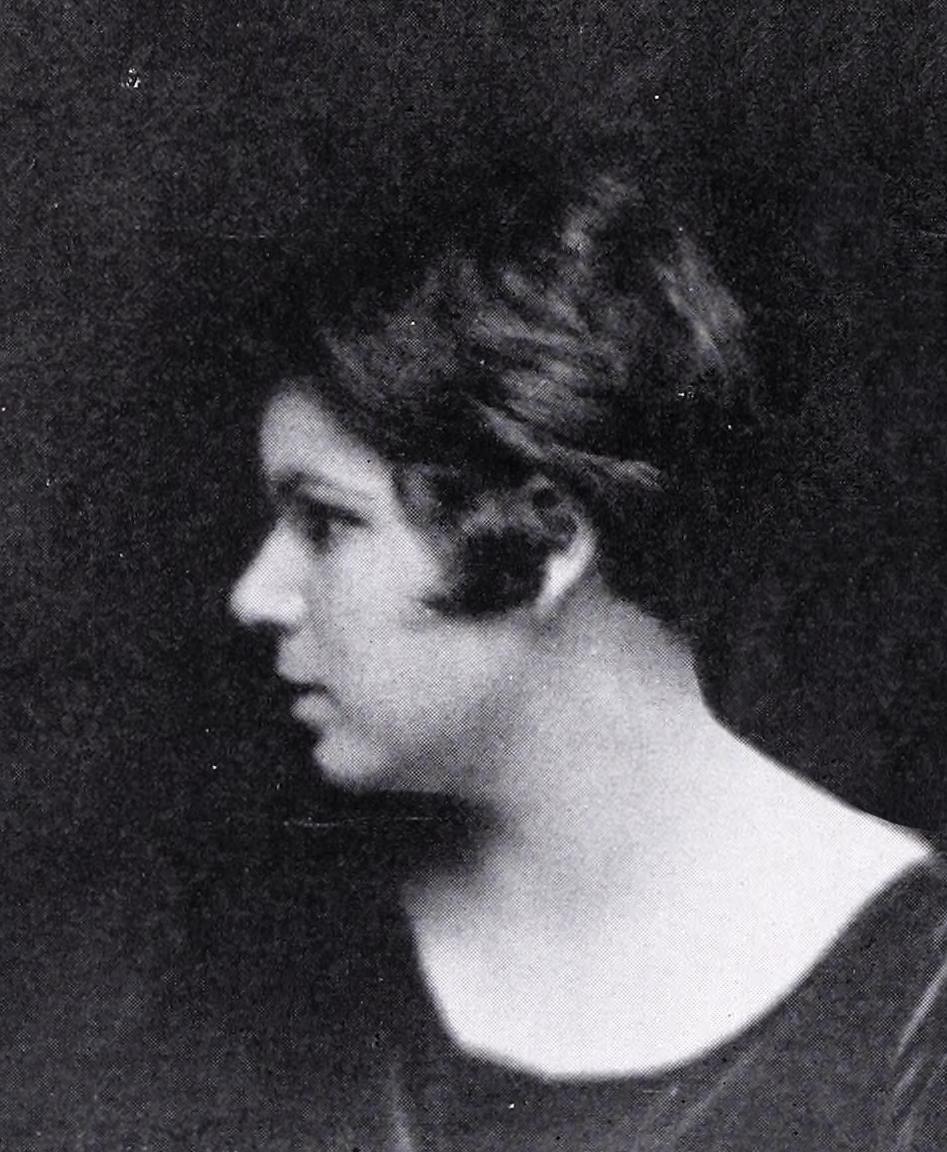
- Born: January 18, 1901; New York City, New York, U.S.
- Died: December 12, 1993 (aged 92); Los Angeles, California, U.S.
- Occupations: Screenwriter, actress
- Father: J. Stuart Blackton

Marian Constance Blackton (January 18, 1901 – December 12, 1993) was an American screenwriter and actress active primarily in the 1920s. She was sometimes credited as Marian Constance.

== Biography ==
Marian was the daughter of film producer J. Stuart Blackton and his wife, Isabelle Mabel MacArthur. Her siblings include filmmaker J. Stuart Blackton Jr., actor Charles Stuart Blackton (half-brother), and actress Violet Virginia Blackton.

She grew up on film sets, thanks to her father's career, and knew early on that she wanted to get into the industry for herself. "Location trips with my father's company were my idea of heaven," she once remarked.

She got her start as a script girl for her father's films at Vitagraph, before establishing a name for herself via her adapted screenplays. She used her position to change the way women were being portrayed at the company: "They began to show some guts. They stopped fluttering. … In short, they stopped being my father's ideal woman," she'd later write.

She was married twice: first to actor Gardner James, a marriage that ended quickly in divorce; and later to filmmaker Laurence Trimble, a marriage that lasted until his death.

Marian Blackton Trimble wrote a personal biography of her father that was edited by film historian Anthony Slide.

== Selected filmography ==
- The American (1927) (scenario)
- Buttons (1927)
- Becky (1927)
- The Passionate Quest (1926)
- The Hypocrite (1926)
- The Gilded Highway (1926; adaptation)
- Bride of the Storm (1926)
- The Happy Warrior (1925)
- The Redeeming Sin (1925)
- The Clean Heart (1924)
- Behold This Woman (1924)
