= Melville W. Brown =

American film editor (1887–1938)

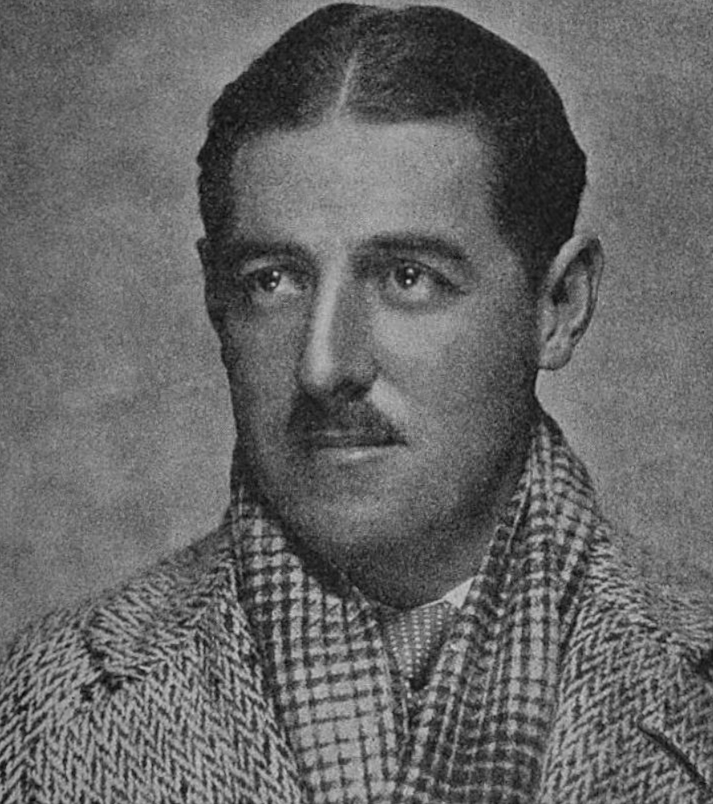
- Born: March 10, 1887; Portland, Oregon, U.S.
- Died: January 31, 1938 (aged 50); Hollywood, California, U.S.
- Occupations: Film director and screenwriter
- Years active: 1919–1937
- Spouse: Margaret Brown

Melville W. Brown (March 10, 1887 – January 31, 1938) was an American film director, screenwriter and occasional actor. He began his career on the local stage in Oregon, in stock companies and vaudeville, before moving to California and working in the silent film industry in 1916, at the suggestion of Charlie Chaplin. His career was cut short when he died of a heart attack in January 1938.

== Early life ==
Brown was born on March 10, 1887, to John and Fannie Brown of Portland, Oregon. He began his career in show business in local vaudeville productions and stock companies, such as the Baker Stock Company in Spokane, Washington. In 1916, at the suggestion of Charlie Chaplin, he moved to Hollywood to start a film career.

== Career ==
His first known credit is as a screenwriter, on the 1919 silent film, The Pest, produced by Goldwyn Pictures, and directed by Christy Cabanne. Over the next several years he would continue to write screenplays, including the critically acclaimed The Goose Woman, which he adapted from a story by Rex Beach, and directed by Clarence Brown (no relation). He would move into the directing field in 1926, with the film, Her Big Night, which he also wrote the screenplay for. In 1935, he left Hollywood and went to England, where he directed several films over the next two years, the last of which, Mad About Money, was released after his death. Over the course of his career, he would write or direct over 30 films in Hollywood and the United Kingdom.

He returned from England in late 1937, and was working on a screenplay when he was stricken by a heart attack and died on January 31, 1938, at the age of 50.

== Filmography ==
Film	Year	Credit	Stars	Reference
The Pest	1919	writer	Mabel Normand, John Bowers, and Charles Gerard	
Fashionable Fakers	1923	writer	Johnnie Walker, Mildred June, and George Cowl	
The Gaiety Girl	1924	writer	Mary Philbin, Joseph J. Dowling, and William Haines	
The Rose of Paris	1924	writer	Mary Philbin, Robert Cain, and John Sainpolis	
The Goose Woman	1925	writer	Louise Dresser, Jack Pickford, and Constance Bennett	
Smouldering Fires	1925	writer	Pauline Frederick, Laura La Plante, and Malcolm McGregor	
Where Was I?	1925	writer	Reginald Denny, Marion Nixon, and Pauline Garon	
Her Big Night	1926	writer, director	Laura La Plante, Einar Hansen, and ZaSu Pitts	
Poker Faces	1926	writer	Edward Everett Horton, Laura La Plante, and George Siegmann	
What Happened to Jones	1926	writer	Reginald Denny, Marian Nixon, and Melbourne MacDowell	
Taxi! Taxi!	1927	writer, director	Edward Everett Horton, Marian Nixon, and Burr McIntosh	
Fast and Furious	1927	director	Reginald Denny, Barbara Worth, and Claude Gillingwater	
13 Washington Square	1928	director	Jean Hersholt, Alice Joyce, and George Lewis	
Buck Privates	1928	writer, director	Lya De Putti, Malcolm McGregor, and ZaSu Pitts	
Red Lips	1928	writer, director	Marion Nixon, Charles "Buddy" Rogers, and Stanley Taylor	
Dance Hall	1929	director	Olive Borden, Arthur Lake, and Margaret Seddon	
Geraldine	1929	director	Marian Nixon, Eddie Quillan, and Albert Gran	
Jazz Heaven	1929	director	John Mack Brown, Sally O'Neil, and Clyde Cook	
The Love Doctor	1929	director	Richard Dix, June Collyer, and Morgan Farley	
Check and Double Check	1930	director	Freeman F. Gosden, Charles J. Correll, and Sue Carol	
Lovin' the Ladies	1930	director	Richard Dix, Lois Wilson, and Allen Kearns	
She's My Weakness	1930	director	Arthur Lake, Sue Carol, and Lucien Littlefield	
Behind Office Doors	1931	director	Mary Astor, Robert Ames, and Ricardo Cortez	
White Shoulders	1931	director	Mary Astor, Jack Holt, and Ricardo Cortez	
Fanny Foley Herself	1931	director	Edna May Oliver, Hobart Bosworth, and Florence Roberts	
Lost in the Stratosphere	1934	director	William Cagney, Eddie Nugent, and June Collyer	
Redhead	1934	director	Bruce Cabot, Grace Bradley, and Regis Toomey	
The Nut Farm	1935	director	Wallace Ford, Betty Alden, and Florence Roberts	
Forced Landing	1935	director	Esther Ralston, Onslow Stevens, and Sidney Blackmer	
Champagne for Breakfast	1935	director	Mary Carlisle, Hardie Albright, and Joan Marsh	
Head Office	1936	director	Owen Nares, Nancy O'Neil, and Arthur Margetson	
Mad About Money	1936	director	Mary Cole, Arthur Finn, and Alf Goddard	
