= Walloping Wallace =

1924 film

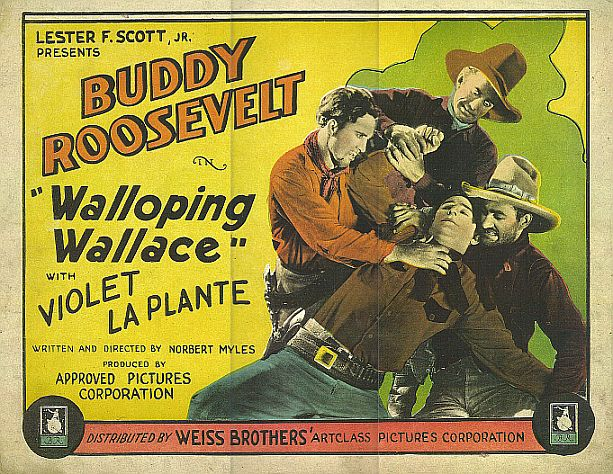
- Directed by: Norbert A. Myles
- Written by: Betty Burbridge; Norbert A. Myles
- Produced by: Lester F. Scott Jr.
- Starring: Buddy Roosevelt; Violet La Plante; Lew Meehan
- Production company: Approved Pictures
- Distributed by: Weiss Brothers
- Release date: October 15, 1924
- Running time: 50 minutes
- Country: United States
- Languages: Silent; English intertitles

Walloping Wallace is a 1924 American silent Western film directed by Norbert A. Myles and starring Buddy Roosevelt, Violet La Plante and Lew Meehan.

== Cast ==
- Buddy Roosevelt as Buddy Wallace
- Violet La Plante as Carol Grey
- Lew Meehan as Squinty Burnt
- N.E. Hendrix as Shorty
- Lillian Gale as Ma Fagin
- Terry Myles as Spud
- Olin Francis as Sheriff
- Dick Bodkins as Cattle buyer

== Bibliography ==
- Goble, Alan. The Complete Index to Literary Sources in Film. Walter de Gruyter, 1999.
