= Smouldering Fires (film) =

1925 film

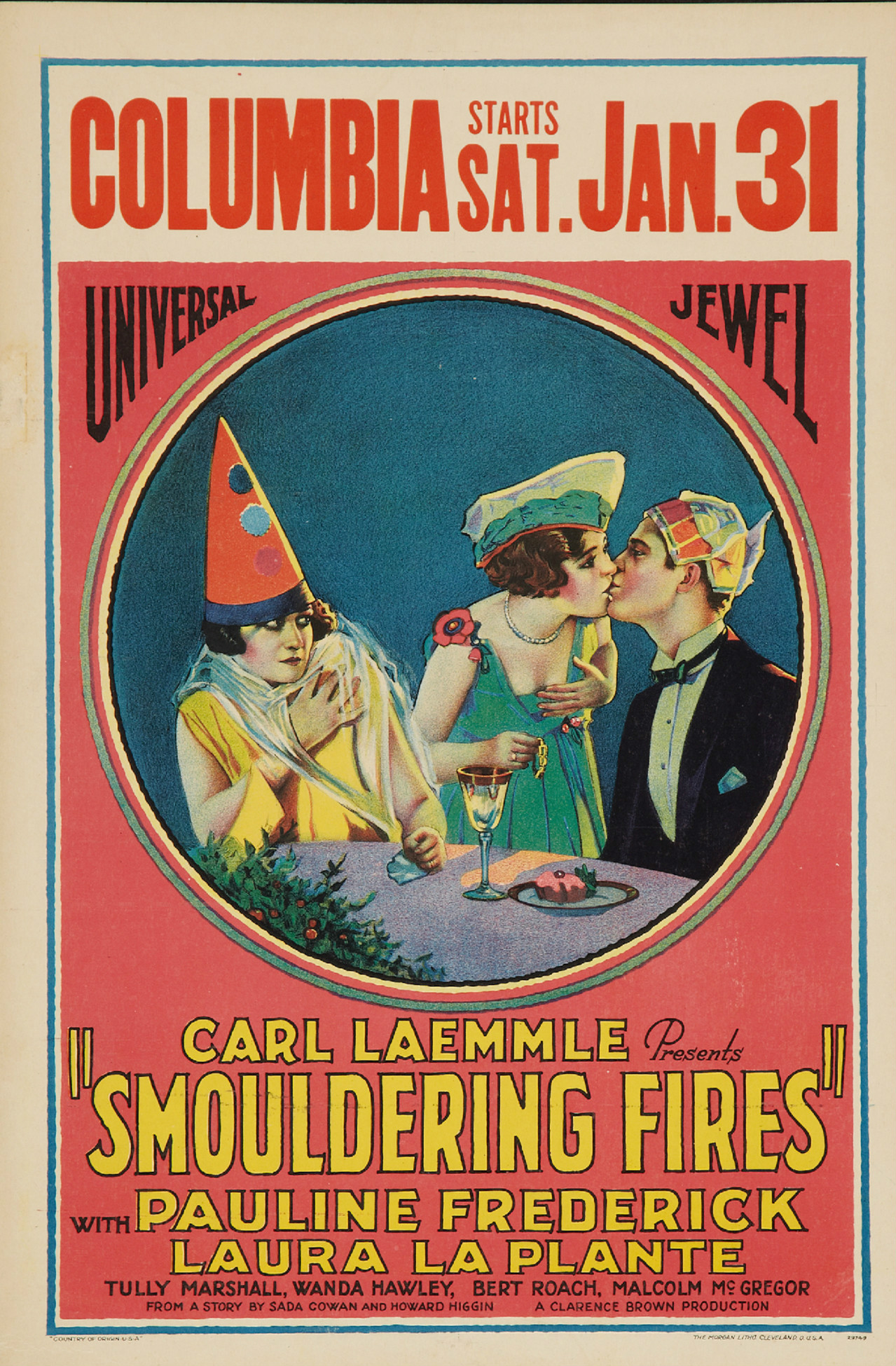
- Film poster
- Directed by: Clarence Brown; Charles Dorian (2nd unit)
- Written by: Melville W. Brown
- Screenplay by: Sada Cowan; Howard Higgin
- Story by: Sada Cowan; Margaret Deland; Howard Higgin; Intertitles: Dwinelle Benthall
- Produced by: Carl Laemmle
- Starring: Laura La Plante; Malcolm McGregor; Tully Marshall; Wanda Hawley; Pauline Frederick
- Cinematography: Jackson Rose
- Edited by: Edward Schroeder
- Production company: Universal Pictures
- Release date: January 18, 1925 (USA)
- Running time: 80 minutes 7,356 feet on 8 reels
- Country: United States
- Language: Silent (English intertitles)

Smouldering Fires

Smouldering Fires is a 1925 American Universal silent drama film directed by Clarence Brown and starring Pauline Frederick and Laura La Plante. The movie's plot is similar to the 1933 talking picture Female, starring Ruth Chatterton.

Copies of this film are archived by the UCLA Film & Television Archive and the George Eastman Museum. In 1953, the film entered the public domain in the United States because the claimants did not renew its copyright registration in the 28th year after publication. It is available on video, and numerous prints exist in private collections.

== Plot ==
As described in a film magazine, Jane Vale, a forty year old business woman who ran a great industrial plant left to her by her father, awoke to the realization that she was in love with Robert Elliott, a youth scarcely more than half her age. This lad first attracted her attention by opposing her policy in a matter of production. She was passing at the time and heard him refer to her executive staff as "yes" men. Her general manager was for firing the boy on the spot, but instead, she made him her assistant. As a result, gossip spread about the factory through the envious mouths of his fellow employees. Feeling bound by his honor to defend her, on an occasion when a tough employee makes a scurrilous remark, the boy strikes him, knocking him down. Jane sees the fight although she is not seen by any of her workers. Then she gets the thrill of her life when, Elliott, the lad, announces that he is engaged to marry Miss Vale. Just before their marriage, Jane's young sister, Dorothy, returns home from college and pays her a visit. The latter is about Elliott's age. The two immediately fall in love with each other, but conceal their growing passion out of love for Jane. Elliott goes through with the marriage, and later, on a mountain climb, circumstances result in Dorothy falling into his arms. It is then that they decide to tell Jane. But again they fail when they realize the pain it will cause her. After a party which was made up of Dorothy's younger friends, Jane discovers that Elliott and Dorothy love each other. Jane pretends that she has fallen out of love with Robert and seeks a divorce. In this way, she paves the way for his freedom and her sister's happiness.

== Cast ==
- Laura La Plante as Dorothy Vale
- Malcolm McGregor as Robert Elliott
- Pauline Frederick as Jane Vale
- Tully Marshall as Scotty
- Wanda Hawley as Lucy
- Helen Lynch as Kate Brown
- George Cooper as Mugsy
- Arthur Lake as party guest

Members of "The Committee:"

- Bert Roach
- Billy Gould
- Rolfe Sedan
- Jack McDonald
- William Orlamond
- Frank Newburg
- Bobbie Mack (credited as Robert Mack)

== Reception ==
Reviewer Hal Erickson wrote that the film "is a first-rate silent 'soap opera', immaculately performed by its superb cast and brilliantly directed." While praising the American release version, he made note that the "slightly longer European version is even better, with some remarkably mature (albeit non-lurid) setpieces".

In The First Female Stars: Women of the Silent Era, author David W. Menefee writes that the film "presented Pauline (Frederick) in a memorable light, successfully carrying off the role of a woman business executive."

In Movies and American Society, author Steven J. Ross wrote that Smouldering Fires was "a cautionary tale of what happens when businesswomen become too successful."

Later, when speaking about Mildred Pierce, film critic Pauline Kael mentions that Smoldering Fires was the precursor for plots where a seducing adult is sophisticated and worldly while the manipulated youth are basically innocent kids.
