= Arizona (1931 film) =

1931 film

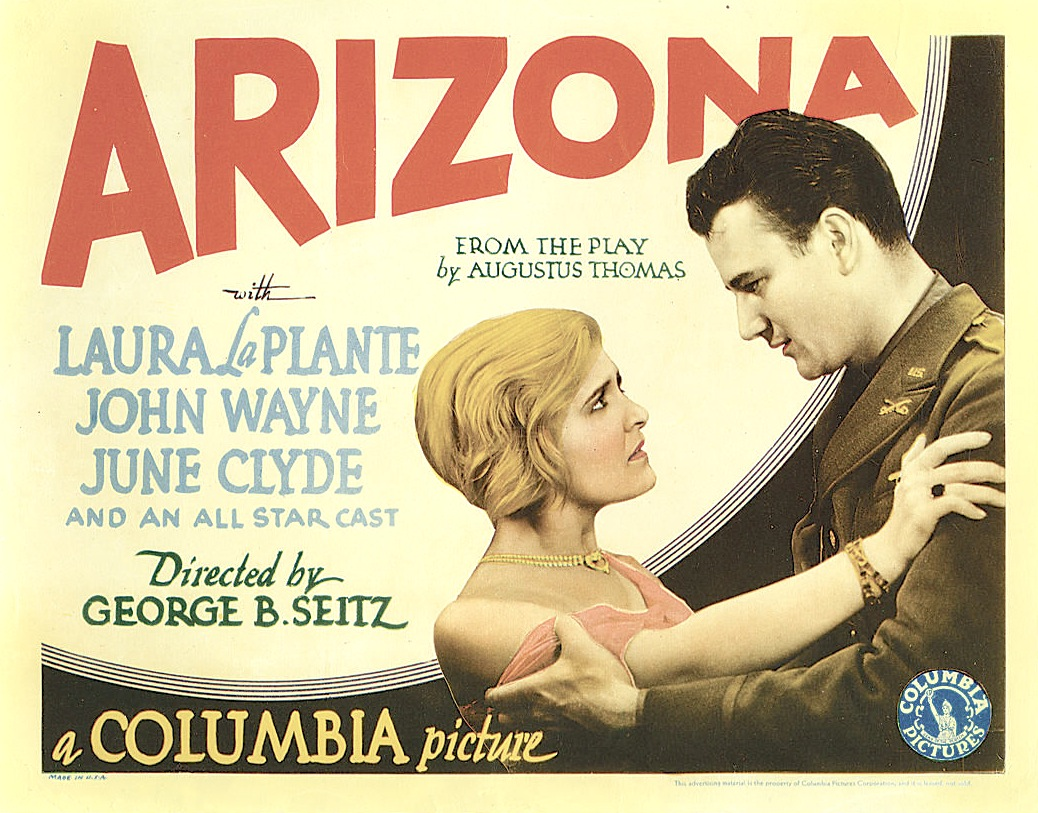
- Directed by: George B. Seitz
- Written by: Dorothy Howell (continuity); Robert Riskin (adaptation); Augustus Thomas (original playwright)
- Produced by: Harry Cohn
- Starring: Laura La Plante; John Wayne; June Clyde
- Cinematography: Ted Tetzlaff
- Edited by: Gene Milford
- Music by: Mischa Bakaleinikoff
- Distributed by: Columbia Pictures
- Release date: June 27, 1931
- Running time: 55 minutes
- Country: United States
- Language: English

Arizona is a 1931 American pre-Code drama film directed by George B. Seitz and starring Laura La Plante, John Wayne and June Clyde. It is one of several films based on Augustus Thomas's 1899 play of the same name. Filmed as "Arizona", the movie's makers applied to the New York State Censor Board for a new title, "Men Are Like That", and the film was released and reviewed under that title in New York and elsewhere. (It was copyrighted under the title Arizona however, and was years later reissued under that name.) The film was released in the U.K. as The Virtuous Wife.

== Plot ==
While at West Point, Lt. Bob Denton rebuffs Evelyn Palmer, who shows up later in Arizona as the wife of his commanding officer. After graduation from West Point, and his assignment to a duty station in Arizona, Denton gets involved in a romantic relationship with Evelyn's younger sister, Bonnie. To keep him from marrying her sister, Evelyn falsely accuses Denton of sexually harassing her, which leads to his being expelled from the Army. She later learns that he and her sister had already been secretly married, however, which leads her to admit her lie about him to her husband, Colonel Bonham, who then reinstates the framed Denton.

== Cast ==
- Laura La Plante as Evelyn Palmer Bonham
- John Wayne as Lt. Bob Denton
- June Clyde as Bonita "Bonnie" Palmer
- Forrest Stanley as Colonel Frank Bonham
- Nina Quartero as Conchita
- Susan Fleming as Dot
- Adrian Morris as Officer

== See also ==
- Arizona (1913)
- Arizona (1918)
