= The Long Long Trail =

1929 film

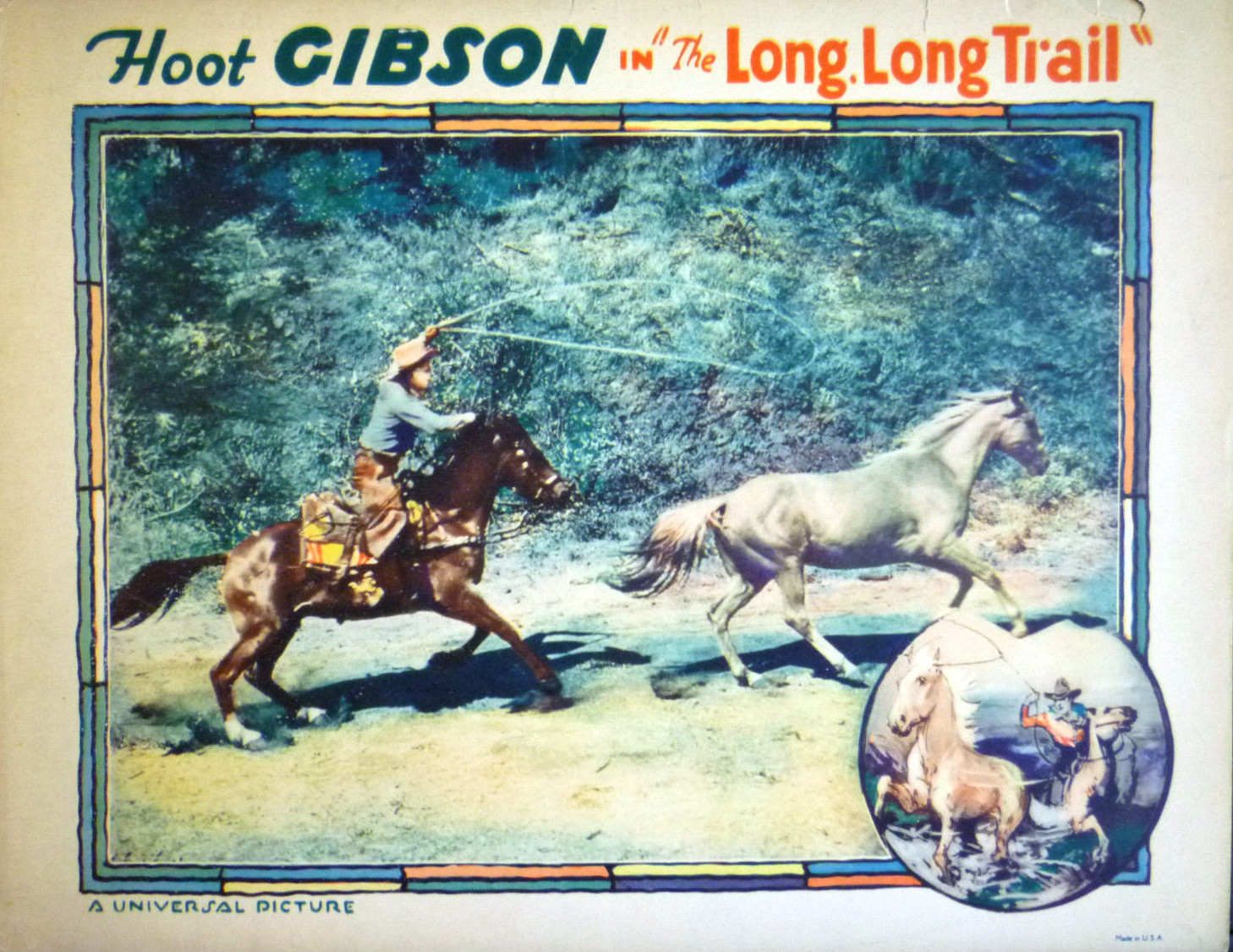
- Lobby card
- Directed by: Arthur Rosson
- Written by: Howard J. Green
- Based on: The Ramblin' Kid by Earl Wayland Bowman
- Produced by: Carl Laemmle
- Starring: Hoot Gibson
- Cinematography: Harry Neuman
- Edited by: Gilmore Walker
- Distributed by: Universal Pictures
- Release date: October 27, 1929
- Running time: 58 minutes
- Country: United States
- Language: English sound film

The Long Long Trail is a 1929 American pre-Code Western film directed by Arthur Rosson and starring Hoot Gibson in his first sound film. It was produced and released by Universal Pictures. The film survives and has been issued on DVD. The novel was filmed earlier in the silent The Ramblin' Kid (1923) which also starred Gibson.

== Cast ==
- Hoot Gibson as The Ramblin Kid
- Sally Eilers as June
- Kathryn McGuire as Ophelia
- James "Jim" Mason as Mike Wilson
- Archie Ricks as Jyp
- Walter Brennan as "Skinny" Rawlins
- Howard Truesdale as Uncle Josh

== See also ==
- List of early sound feature films (1926–1929)
