= Erma Horsley =

American film editor

- Born: Erma Ruth Dunkell; January 17, 1895; Los Angeles, California, USA
- Died: July 9, 1977 (aged 82); Los Angeles, California
- Education: Hollywood High School
- Occupation(s): Film editor, screenwriter
- Spouse(s): Arthur Horsley; Robert Owen Crandall

Erma Ruth Horsley (née Dunkell; January 17, 1895 – July 9, 1977) was an American film editor and screenwriter who worked for Republic Pictures during the 1920s and 1930s.

== Biography ==
Dunkell was born in Los Angeles to Frank E. Dunkell and Anna May Rayburn. She attended Hollywood High School before marrying Fox producer Arthur Horsley in 1916. She worked as a film editor at the studios and also got a writing credit on 1928's Mystery Valley.

She later married fellow editor Robert Owen Crandall. They ran their own company, Erro Film Service, in the 1940s.

== Selected filmography ==
As editor:

- I Cover the War! (1937)
- California Straight Ahead! (1937)
- Conflict (1936)
- Mystery Valley (1928)
- Lightnin' Shot (1928)
- The Devil's Tower (1928)
- The Grey Vulture (1926)

As writer:

- Mystery Valley (1928)
