= New York State Censorship Board =

Defunct regulatory agency in New York

Agency overview
- Formed: 1921; 105 years ago
- Dissolved: 1965; 61 years ago
- Type: Censorship board
- Jurisdiction: New York

The Motion Picture Division of the State of New York Education Department, also known variously as the New York State Censorship Board, New York Censor Board, and New York Board of Censors, was an organ of film censorship in the Pre-Code film era.

The board was created in 1921 as the New York State Motion Picture Commission and the first film it rejected in whole was the Lon Chaney crime film The Night Rose (1921), which it condemned "as highly immoral and of such character that its exhibition would not only tend to corrupt morals, but to incite crime." After a state court upheld the decision, Goldwyn came to an agreement with the Commission and reedited the film, deleting most of the Chaney scenes, and released it in 1922 as Voices of the City. In 1927, as part of a statewide reorganization, the Board was put under the auspices of the State Department of Education and was subject to the oversight of the Board of Regents. But the Regents mostly left the Board and its censors alone, only getting involved when a movie distributor brought suit when the Motion Picture Division had denied a license to a movie.

Six other states (Maryland, Pennsylvania, Ohio, Virginia, Massachusetts, and Kansas) also had movie censorship boards.

The board's activities ended in 1965.

== See also ==
- Film censorship in the United States
