= The Devil's Tower =

1928 film directed by J.P. McGowan

- Directed by: J. P. McGowan
- Written by: Victor Rousseau; J. P. McGowan
- Produced by: Trem Carr
- Starring: Buddy Roosevelt; Thelma Parr; J. P. McGowan
- Cinematography: Hap Depew
- Edited by: Erma Horsley
- Production company: Trem Carr Pictures
- Distributed by: Rayart Pictures
- Release date: June 1928
- Running time: 50 minutes
- Country: United States
- Languages: Silent; English intertitles

The Devil's Tower is a 1928 American silent Western film directed by J. P. McGowan and starring Buddy Roosevelt, Thelma Parr and McGowan.

== Cast ==
- Buddy Roosevelt as James Murdock
- Frank Earle as Tom Murdock
- J. P. McGowan as George Stilwell
- Thelma Parr as Doris Stilwell
- Art Rowlands as Phillip Wayne
- Tom Bay as Dutch Haynes

== Preservation ==
With no holdings located in archives, The Devil's Tower is considered a lost film.

== Bibliography ==
- Munden, Kenneth White. The American Film Institute Catalog of Motion Pictures Produced in the United States, Part 1. University of California Press, 1997.
