= Thelma Parr =

American actress

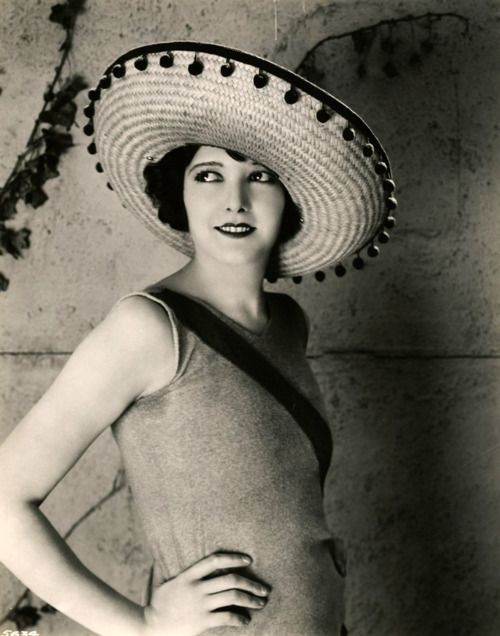
- Born: Thelma Sill; October 19, 1906; Grants Pass, Oregon, U.S.
- Died: February 13, 2000 (aged 93); San Clemente, California, U.S.
- Occupation: Actress
- Years active: 1925–1930
- Spouse: William E. Goman (m.1925–div.1930)

Thelma Parr (née Sill, October 19, 1906 – February 13, 2000) was an American actress who played in Mack Sennett comedies as one of the Sennett Bathing Beauties. She was considered by film critics to be one of the most beautiful brunettes in Hollywood films.

== Life ==
Parr was reportedly a descendant of philosopher Thomas Paine.

She was married to banjo player, William E. Goman, in Santa Ana, California on May 21, 1925. Parr obtained a divorce decree from Goman in April 1930.

Parr's film career was ended by a car accident in which she received facial injuries in March 1928 on Sunset Boulevard. Her mouth was badly mutilated when she was thrown against a windshield of an auto in which she was a passenger; Parr received a compensatory sum of $7,112 from the driver of the vehicle, Kenneth Sanderson.

Thelma Parr died in San Clemente, California in 2000, aged 93.

== Filmography ==
Year	Title	Role	Notes	Ref.
1925	His Marriage Wow	Wedding Guest		
1925	The Raspberry Romance	Mrs. Arthur Fish		
1925	Bashful Jim	Actress in Film The Power		
1925	Breaking the Ice	Gloria Morgan		
1925	The Lion's Whiskers			
1925	Skinners in Silk	The Promoter's Wife		
1925	Tee for Two	Lucille van Huff		
1925	Hurry, Doctor!	Helen Waring		
1925	Good Morning, Madam	Thelma Meadows		
1925	Take Your Time	Thelma Lovejoy		
1925	The Window Dummy	Thelma Brooks		
1925	From Rags to Britches	Bathing Beauty		
1926	The Gosh-Darn Mortgage	Tessie Spruder		
1926	Wide Open Faces	Thelma Lee		
1926	Whispering Whiskers	Train Passenger	Also known as: We Want Whiskers	
1926	The Funnymooners	Thelma		
1926	Meet My Girl	Thelma Lane		
1926	Hooked at the Altar	Thelma Stetson		
1926	Hubby's Quiet Little Game	Thelma Stone		
1926	When a Man's Prince	Party Girl		
1926	Her Actor Friend	Mrs. Charlie Dingle		
1926	Smith's Landlord	Mrs. Crabtree		
1926	The Perils of Petersboro	Thelma Knight		
1926	Masked Mamas	Thelma Denton		
1926	The Divorce Dodger	Betty Brent		
1926	A Blonde's Revenge	Banker's Wife		
1927	Should Sleepwalkers Marry?	Mrs. George Stevens		
1927	A Hollywood Hero			
1927	The Scorcher			
1927	Peaches and Plumbers	The Maid		
1927	A Small Town Princess			
1927	Catalina, Here I Come	Swimmer		
1927	His First Flame	Girl Who Drops Handkerchief Outside Firehouse		
1928	The Devil's Tower	Doris Stilwell		
1930	My Harem			

== Sources ==
- Sherk, Warren M. (1998). The Films of Mack Sennett: Credit Documentation from the Mack Sennett Collection at the Margaret Herrick Library. Lanham, Maryland: Scarecrow Press. ISBN 978-0-810-83443-9.
- Walker, Brent E. (2013). Mack Sennett's Fun Factory: A History and Filmography of His Studio and His Keystone and Mack Sennett Comedies, with Biographies of Players and Personnel. Jefferson, North Carolina: McFarland. ISBN 978-0-786-47711-1.
