= Her Big Night =

1926 film

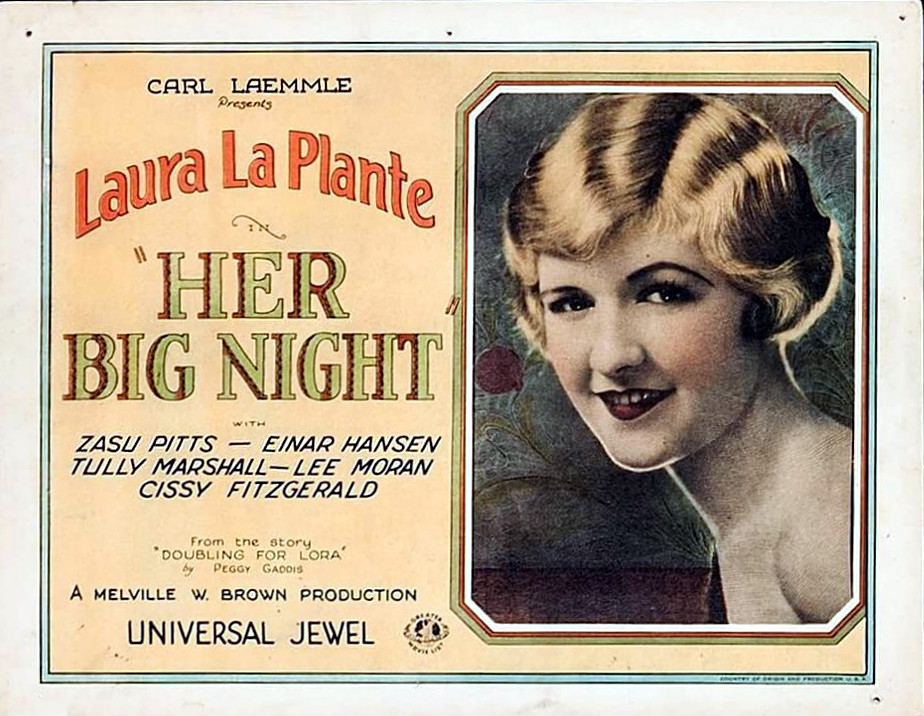
- Lobby card
- Directed by: Melville W. Brown
- Written by: Melville W. Brown (adaptation); Rex Taylor; Nita O'Neil
- Based on: Doubling for Lora by Peggy Gaddis
- Produced by: Carl Laemmle
- Starring: Laura La Plante; Einar Hanson; Zasu Pitts
- Cinematography: Arthur L. Todd
- Distributed by: Universal Jewel
- Release date: December 5, 1926
- Running time: 80 minutes
- Country: United States
- Language: Silent (English intertitles)

Her Big Night is a 1926 American silent comedy film directed by Melville W. Brown and written by Brown, Rex Taylor, and Nita O'Neil. It is based on the 1925 short story, Doubling for Lora, by Peggy Gaddis that was originally serialized in Breezy Stories magazine. The film stars Laura La Plante in dual role, Einar Hanson, and Zasu Pitts. The film was released on December 5, 1926, by Universal Pictures under their 'Jewel' banner.

The film was shown at the 1926 opening of the Rivoli Theatre in Montreal, Canada, the January 14, 1927, opening of the Bagdad Theatre in Portland, Oregon, Oregon, and the January 21, 1927, opening of the Empire Theatre in Birmingham, Alabama.

== Plot ==
As described in a film magazine, film studio press agent Tom Barrett notices that shop worker Frances Norcross has a striking resemblance to actress Daphne Dix, so he gives her two tickets to a theater where Daphne is to appear that night for the opening night of her latest film, Her Big Night. Later, after Daphne has not returned from a yacht trip taken with millionaire Mr. Harmon and knowing newspaper reporters hope to write stories that suggest a scandal if she is late, Tom offers Frances $1000 if she will impersonate Daphne and appear in her place. Frances puts on the actress' clothes and, on the way to the theater, gasps when she sees her fiancé Johnny Young among the onlookers outside. He was going to attend the event with her and is puzzled by the apparent recognition of the actress, so he decides to investigate. Reporter Adams overhears studio executive Myers tell Tom something about how the switch fooled the press, so he sends a cub reporter Harold Crosby to impersonate Daphne's husband Allan Dix, who is out of town. Tom drops Frances off at Daphne's apartment to change, and, after Tom leaves, Harold arrives with luggage and embraces Frances, calling her his little wife. Frances bluffs through this until he asks her if she is ready for bed, so she pleads hunger. While he is in the kitchen making some sandwiches, millionaire Harmon shows up to beg forgiveness for attempting to abduct the actress on his yacht. Meanwhile, the real Daphne is explaining to Myers how Harmon tried to keep her on his yacht. Back at the apartment, Mrs. Harmon, seeking her husband, and fiancé Johnny show up. Hearing of an unknown husband in the kitchen, Johnny beats up Harold in error and then leaves, believing that Frances deceived him. While Harold is in the bathroom dressing his wounds, Daphne's real husband Allan returns. Mrs. Harmon demands to see her husband, and Harold takes another beating and is thrown out of the apartment by Alan. Mrs. Harmon finds her husband hiding in a linen chest and leads him out by his ear. Adams and Tom arrive to find Frances convincingly embracing Daphne's husband. Still suspicious, Adams asks her for an autographed picture, so Frances goes to Daphne's room. Daphne arrives, slips into her room unnoticed, and then comes out and signs her photograph perfectly for the reporter, who leaves in a daze but now convinced. Johnny returns and finds the two young women who now explain everything, and all is domestic bliss.

== Cast ==
- Laura La Plante as Frances Norcross / Daphne Dix
- Einar Hanson as Johnny Young
- Zasu Pitts as Gladys Smith
- Tully Marshall as J.Q. Adams, reporter
- Lee Moran as Tom Barrett
- Mack Swain as Myers, film producer
- John Roche as Allan Dix
- William Austin as Harold Crosby, cub reporter
- Nat Carr as Mr. Harmon
- Cissy Fitzgerald as Mrs. Harmon

== Preservation ==
A copy of Her Big Night is housed at UCLA Film and Television Archive.
