= Around the World in 18 Days =

1923 film serial

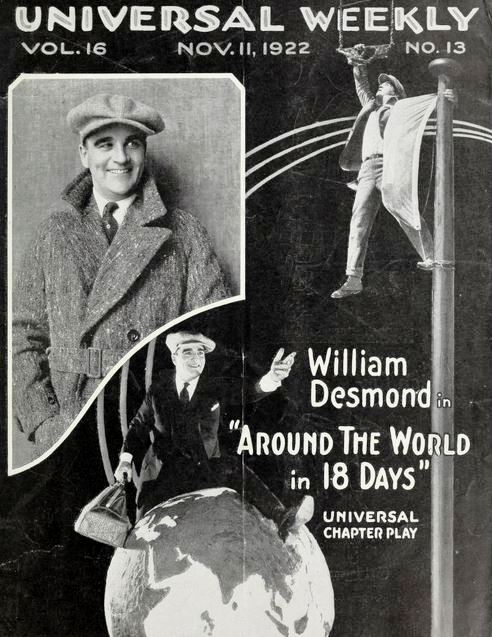
- Stills with William Desmond on the cover of Universal Weekly
- Directed by: B. Reeves Eason; Robert F. Hill
- Written by: Frank Howard Clark (scenario); George Bronson Howard (scenario)
- Story by: Robert Dillon
- Starring: William Desmond; Laura La Plante
- Distributed by: Universal Pictures
- Release date: January 1, 1923
- Running time: 12 episodes
- Country: United States
- Language: Silent (English intertitles)

Around the World in 18 Days is a 1923 American silent film serial directed by B. Reeves Eason and Robert F. Hill. A total of twelve episodes of the serial were released. The film is now considered lost.

Stunt pilot Gene (Jean) Edward Perkins fell to his death while shooting an episode where he was to hang from a rope ladder off the side of a plane while attempting to transfer to a moving train.

== Cast ==
- William Desmond as Phineas Fogg III
- Laura La Plante as Madge Harlow
- William De Vaull as Jiggs (as William P. DeVaul)
- Wade Boteler as Wallace J. Brenton
- Percy Challenger as Rand
- William Welsh as Matthew Harlow (as William J. Welsh)
- Hamilton Morse as Smith
- Tom Guise as Davis (as Tom S. Guise)
- L.J. O'Connor as Detective (as Louis J. O'Connor)
- Arthur Millett as Detective (as Arthur N. Millett)
- Gordon Sackville as White
- Alfred Hollingsworth as Phineas' Father
- Pat Calhoun as Butler
- Spottiswoode Aitken as Piggott
- Harry De Vere as Book Maker (as Harry T. De Vere)
- Boyd Irwin as Muriarc
- Sidney De Gray as Hyppolyte Darcy (as Sydney De Gray)
- Jean De Briac as Desplayer

== See also ==
- List of American films of 1923
- List of film serials
- List of film serials by studio
- List of lost films
