= Laura La Plante =

American actress (1904–1996)

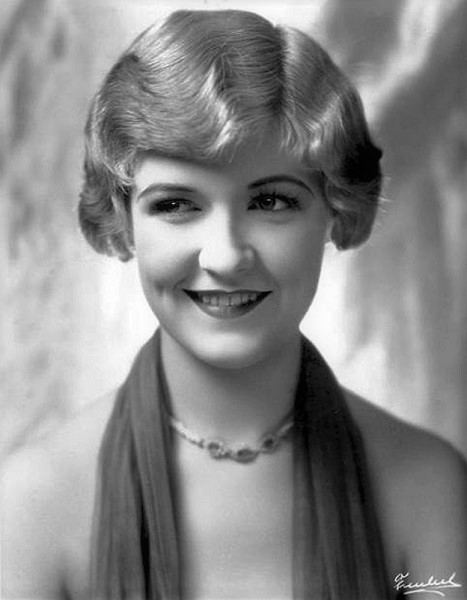
- La Plante ca. 1925
- Born: Laura Laplante; November 1, 1904; St. Louis, Missouri, U.S.
- Died: October 14, 1996 (aged 91); Woodland Hills, California, U.S.
- Occupation: Actress
- Years active: 1920–1956
- Spouses: William A. Seiter (m. 1926; div. 1934) Irving Asher (m. 1934; died 1985)
- Children: 2, including Tony Asher
- Relatives: Violet La Plante (sister)

Laura La Plante (born Laura Laplante; November 1, 1904 – October 14, 1996) was an American film actress; her more notable performances were in the silent era.

== Early life ==
La Plante was born in St. Louis, Missouri on November 1, 1904, the daughter of William A. Laplante and Elizabeth E. Turk. Her father taught dancing. After her parents were divorced her mother took her and her sister Violet to live in San Diego. In her teens, La Plante stayed with Mary MacMahon, her cousin, in Hollywood during a summer vacation and replied to a newspaper ad asking for children for moving pictures, and she was hired. After this, La Plante's mother started to lose her hearing, and her cousin Mary persuaded her to try more work in motion pictures to earn money for the family. La Plante became an extra with The Christie Film Company on Gower Street.

== Silent film career ==
La Plante made her acting debut at age 15, and in 1923, she was named as one of that year's WAMPAS Baby Stars. During the 1920s, she appeared in more than 60 films. Her early films include Big Town Round-Up (1921), with cowboy star Tom Mix, the serials Perils of the Yukon (1922), Around the World in Eighteen Days (1923), and several movies with Hoot Gibson.

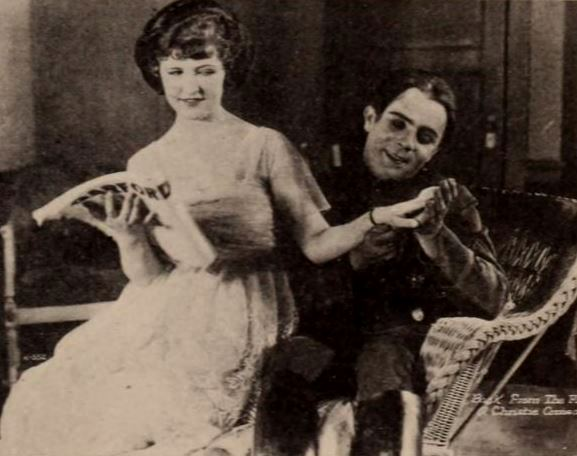
La Plante in 1920, seen here with Bobby Vernon in an image published in the Exhibitors Herald

The majority of the films starring La Plante (from 1920 to 1930) were made for Universal Pictures. During this period, she was the studio's most popular star, which historian William Drew describes as "an accomplishment duplicated only by Deanna Durbin years later." She almost always enjoyed top billing.

One of La Plante's early surviving films is Smouldering Fires (1925), directed by Clarence Brown and costarring Pauline Frederick. Her best-remembered film is arguably the silent classic The Cat and the Canary (1927), but she achieved acclaim for Skinner's Dress Suit (1926), with Reginald Denny, the part-sound The Love Trap (1929), directed by William Wyler, and the 1929 part-sound Show Boat (1929), adapted from the novel of the same name by Edna Ferber.

Although this last film was an adaptation of the novel and not of the famous musical play (itself adapted from the 1926 novel), some songs from the play were included in the film as box-office insurance. La Plante did not sing in the movie; her singing was provided by Eva Olivetti in one of the early examples of such dubbing. A scene of La Plante in Show Boat was broadcast in the early days of British television.

== Transition to sound films ==
The advent of sound films effectively shortened her career. In her mid-20s, La Plante was a natural and appealing presence in early sound films, but the huge wave of new stars in these years overshadowed her. She made her last appearances for Universal in the Technicolor musical King of Jazz (1930). She appeared in God's Gift to Women (Warner Bros., 1931), directed by Michael Curtiz and co-starring Frank Fay and Joan Blondell, and Arizona (Columbia, 1931), co-starring alongside a young John Wayne.

== Later career ==
La Plante went to Britain to work at Warner Brothers' Teddington Studios. The company had faced criticism for the low quality of its "quota quickies", and her arrival coincided with an attempt to make expensive productions. She starred in Man of the Moment (1935), with Douglas Fairbanks, Jr. She appeared in the West End playing the lead in Ian Hay's Admirals All. La Plante briefly was considered to replace Myrna Loy in the Thin Man when Loy thought about leaving the series, but Loy stayed as Nora Charles, and La Plante's career never rebounded. She retired from the screen in 1935, making only two later films, and 1957's Spring Reunion was her last. Her younger sister, actress Violet, never achieved La Plante's level of fame; both sisters were WAMPAS Baby Stars.

On June 3, 1954 (Season 4 Episode 38), La Plante made a guest appearance (as herself, Mrs. Laura Asher) on Groucho Marx's quiz show You Bet Your Life. In this episode, La Plante discussed numerous topics, including her husband Irving Asher, who had just lost 25 lbs. and completed the film Elephant Walk with Elizabeth Taylor. Mrs. Asher asked that her winnings, if any, go to the Motion Picture Relief Fund. They got three out of four questions correct to win $215. In the mid-1980s, La Plante was brought on stage in a wheelchair to wave to the crowd at the event Night of a Hundred Stars.

== Death ==
La Plante died on October 14, 1996, at the age of 91 in Woodland Hills, California. Her death was due to Alzheimer's disease. La Plante was cremated by Valhalla Memorial Park Cemetery in North Hollywood, California, and her ashes scattered at sea.

== Legacy ==
- Laura La Plante Drive in Agoura Hills, California

== Filmography ==
Year	Title	Role	Note
1920	813	Genevieve	Lost film
1921	Play Square	May Laverne	Lost film
1921	The Old Swimmin' Hole	Myrtle	
1921	The Big Town Round-Up	Mildred Hart	Lost film
1921	Big Town Ideas	Molly Dorn	Lost film
1922	Perils of the Yukon	Olga	Preserved at the Cinematek
1922	The Wall Flower	Prue Nickerson	Lost film
1923	Around the World in Eighteen Days	Madge Harlow	Lost film
1923	Crooked Alley	Norine Tyrell	A copy is held at the UCLA Film and Television Archive
1923	Dead Game	Alice Mason	Lost film
1923	Burning Words	Mary Malcolm	Lost film
1923	Shootin' for Love	Mary Randolph	Lost film
1923	Out of Luck	Mae Day	Lost film
1923	The Ramblin' Kid	Carolyn June	Lost film
1923	The Thrill Chaser	Cameo Appearance	Lost film
1924	Sporting Youth	Betty Rockford	Preserved at the EYE Film Institute Netherlands and the UCLA Film and Television Archive
1924	Excitement	Nila Lyons	Lost film
1924	The Dangerous Blonde	Diane Faraday	Lost film
1924	Young Ideas	Octavia Lowden	A copy is held at the EYE Film Institute Netherlands
1924	Ride for Your Life	Betsy Burke	Lost film
1924	The Fast Worker	Connie Fowler	Copies held at the EYE Film Institute Netherlands and the UCLA Film and Television Archive
1924	Butterfly	Dora Collier	A copy is held at the UCLA Film and Television Archive
1925	Smouldering Fires	Dorothy Vale	
1925	The Teaser	Ann Barton	Lost film
1925	Dangerous Innocence	Ann Church	Lost film
1926	The Beautiful Cheat	Mary Callahan / Maritza Callahansky	A copy is held at the UCLA Film and Television Archive
1926	Skinner's Dress Suit	Mrs. Honey Skinner	
1926	The Midnight Sun	Olga 'The Midnight Sun' Morova	A copy is held at the UCLA Film and Television Archive
1926	Her Big Night	Frances Norcross/Daphne Dix	A copy is held at the UCLA Film and Television Archive
1926	Butterflies in the Rain	Mrs. Glenson	Lost film
1926	Poker Faces	Betty Whitmore	
1927	The Love Thrill	Joyce Bragdon	Lost film
1927	Beware of Widows	Joyce Bragdon	Lost film
1927	Silk Stockings	Tina Carteret	
1927	The Cat and the Canary	Annabelle West	
1928	Thanks for the Buggy Ride	Jenny	Lost film
1928	Finders Keepers	Barbara Hastings	Preserved at the Library of Congress
1928	Home, James	Laura Elliot	Preserved at the UCLA Film and Television Archive and Cinematek
1928	The Last Warning	Doris Terry	
1929	Scandal	Laura Hunt	Lost film
1929	Show Boat	Magnolia Hawks	
1929	The Love Trap	Evelyn Todd	
1929	Hold Your Man	Mary	
1930	King of Jazz	Editor	
1930	Captain of the Guard	Marie Marnay	
1931	Stout Hearts and Willing Hands	The Heroine	
1931	Arizona	Evelyn Palmer Bonham	
1931	God's Gift to Women	Diane Churchill	
1931	Lonely Wives	Diane O'Dare	
1931	Meet the Wife	Gertrude Lennox	
1931	The Sea Ghost	Evelyn Inchcape	
1933	Her Imaginary Lover	Celia	Lost film
1934	The Girl in Possession	Eve Chandler	Lost film
1934	The Church Mouse	Betty 'Miss Church Mouse' Miller	
1935	Widow's Might	Nancy Tweesdale	
1935	Man of the Moment	Mary Briany	
1947	Little Mister Jim	Mrs. Glenson	
1956	Spring Reunion	May Brewster	

== See also ==
- Silent films
