= The Ramblin' Galoot =

1926 film

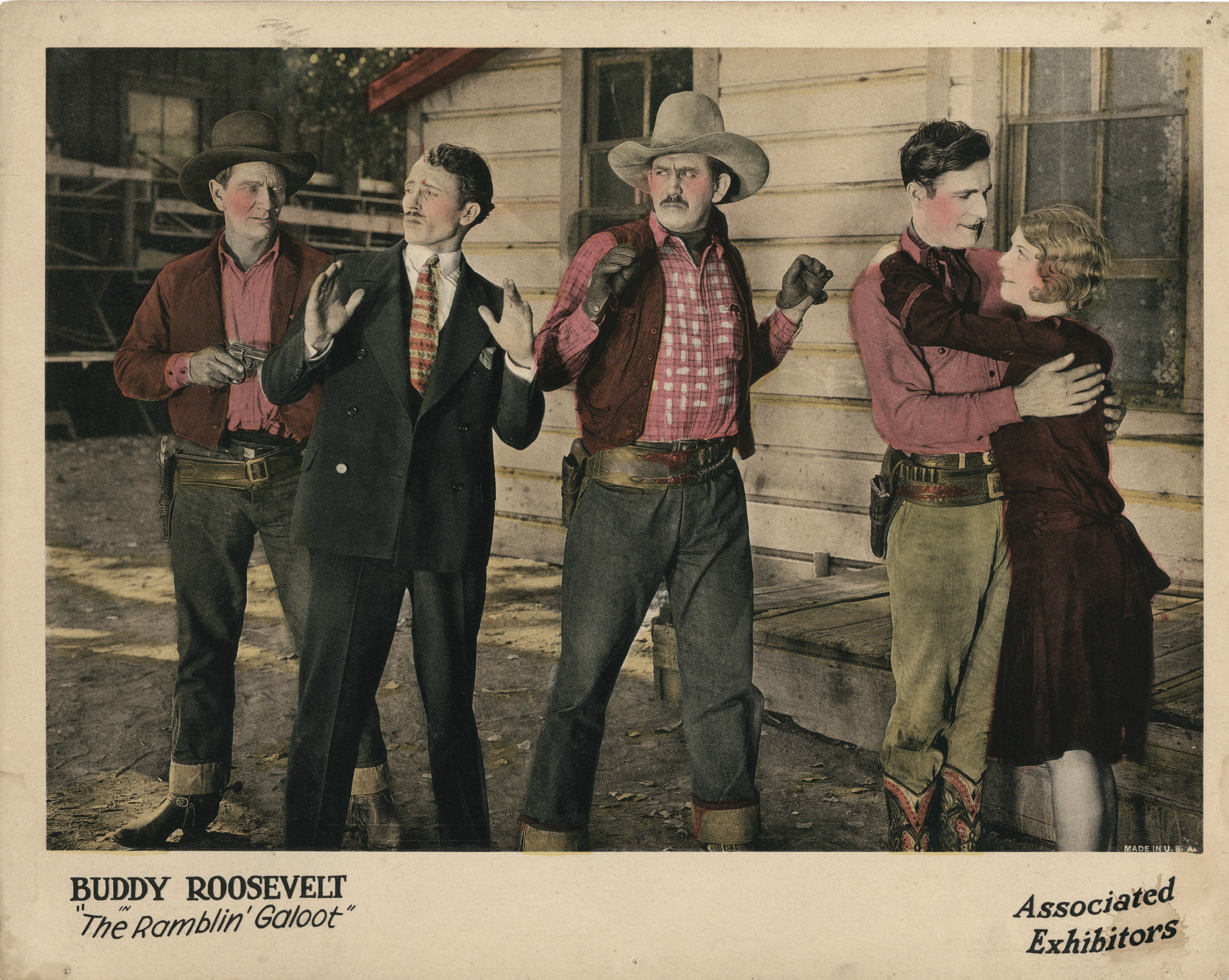
- Lobby card
- Directed by: Fred Bain
- Written by: Barr Cross
- Produced by: Lester F. Scott Jr.
- Starring: Buddy Roosevelt; Violet La Plante; Frederick Lee
- Cinematography: Ray Ries
- Production company: Action Pictures
- Distributed by: Associated Exhibitors
- Release date: November 21, 1926 (US)
- Running time: 5 reels
- Country: United States
- Languages: Silent; English intertitles

The Ramblin' Galoot is a 1926 American silent Western film. Directed by Fred Bain at the Poverty Row studios of Action Pictures, the film stars Buddy Roosevelt, Violet La Plante, and Frederick Lee. It was released on November 21, 1926.

== Plot ==
Cowboy and golf enthusiast Buddy Royle offers to help teach the game on a banker's ranch. The banker then tries to frame Buddy as part of a counterfeiting plot, and Buddy is kidnapped by the schemers. However, his golf tutee saves him and they find romance together. Buddy reveals himself to be a Bankers Association agent.

== Cast ==
- Buddy Roosevelt as Buddy Royle
- Violet La Plante as Pansy Price
- Frederick Lee as Roger Farnley
- Al Taylor
- Slim Whitaker (credited as Charles Whitaker)
- Nelson McDowell
- Charles McClary
- Harry Delmour
- Hank Bell

== Preservation ==
The film is now lost.
