= The Scorcher =

1927 film

- Directed by: Harry Joe Brown
- Written by: Henry Roberts Symonds
- Produced by: Harry Joe Brown; W. Ray Johnston
- Starring: Reed Howes; Thelma Parr; Hank Mann
- Cinematography: William H. Tuers
- Production company: Harry J. Brown Productions
- Distributed by: Rayart Pictures
- Release date: January 1927
- Running time: 50 minutes
- Country: United States
- Languages: Silent; English intertitles

The Scorcher is a 1927 American silent action film directed by Harry Joe Brown and starring Reed Howes, Thelma Parr and Hank Mann. It was distributed by the independent Rayart Pictures, the forerunner of Monogram Pictures.

== Synopsis ==
A young mechanic has invented a potentially valuable new device, but he is unable to fund its development. When he learns about a cross-country motorcycle race with a cash prize he decides to enter.

== Cast ==
- Reed Howes as Mike O'Malley
- Thelma Parr
- Hank Mann
- Harry Allen
- Ernest Hilliard
- Georgie Chapman

== Bibliography ==
- Munden, Kenneth White. The American Film Institute Catalog of Motion Pictures Produced in the United States, Part 1. University of California Press, 1997.
