= Mystery Valley =

1928 film directed by J.P. McGowan

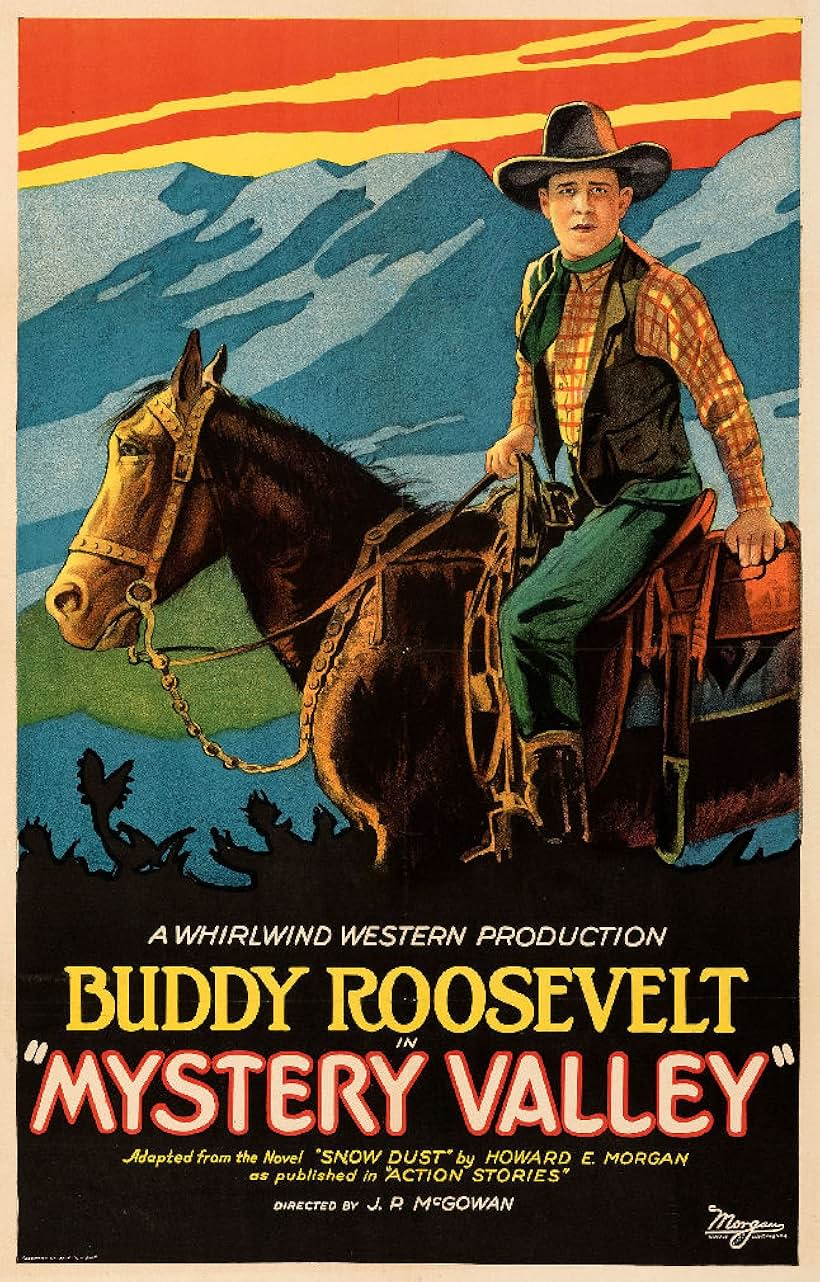
- Directed by: J.P. McGowan
- Written by: Erma Horsley; J.P. McGowan; Howard E. Morgan
- Produced by: Trem Carr
- Starring: Buddy Roosevelt
- Cinematography: Hap Depew
- Edited by: Erma Horsley
- Production company: Trem Carr Pictures
- Distributed by: Rayart Pictures
- Release date: July 23, 1928
- Running time: 50 minutes
- Country: United States
- Languages: Silent; English intertitles

Mystery Valley is a 1928 American silent Western film directed by J.P. McGowan and starring Buddy Roosevelt.

== Cast ==
- Buddy Roosevelt as Steve Larkin
- Carol Lane as Marie Ladeaus
- Tom Bay as Dan Mason
- Art Rowlands
- Jimmy Kane

== Bibliography ==
- Munden, Kenneth White. The American Film Institute Catalog of Motion Pictures Produced in the United States, Part 1. University of California Press, 1997.
