= The Ramblin' Kid =

1923 film directed by Edward Sedgwick

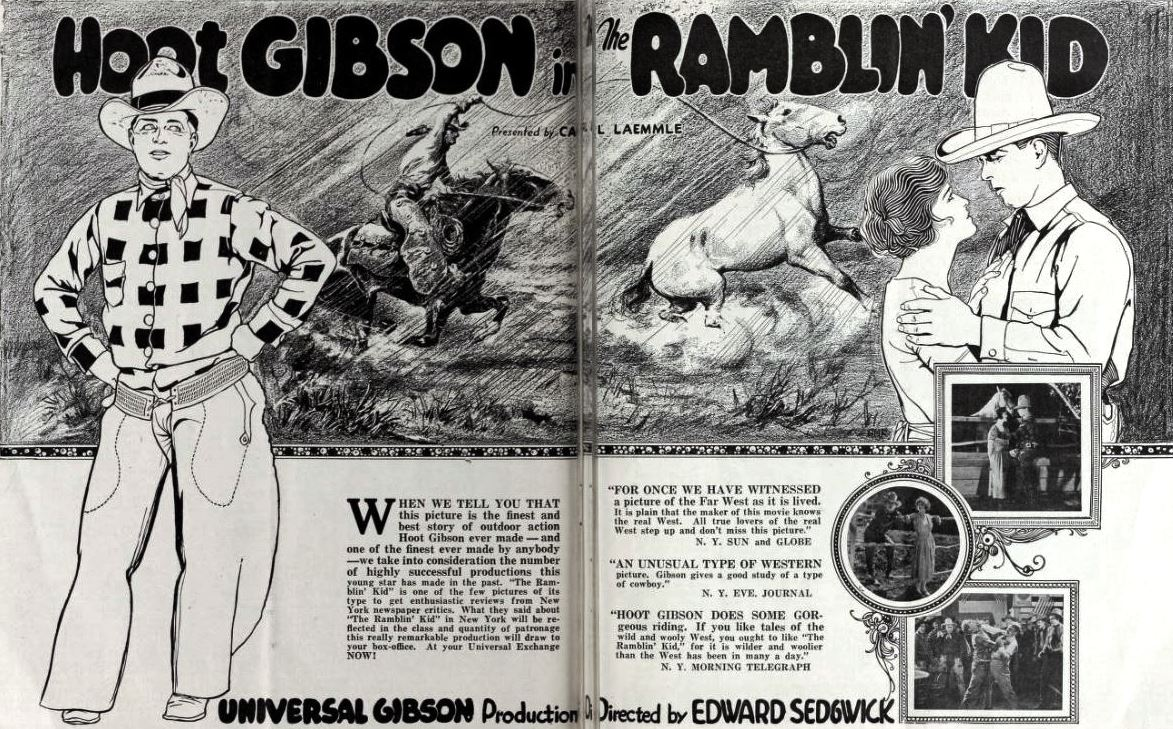
- Trade advertisement
- Directed by: Edward Sedgwick
- Written by: Richard Schayer
- Based on: The Ramblin' Kid by Earl Wayland Bowman
- Starring: Hoot Gibson; Laura La Plante
- Cinematography: Virgil Miller
- Distributed by: Universal Pictures
- Release date: October 14, 1923
- Running time: 60 minutes
- Country: United States
- Languages: Silent; English intertitles

The Ramblin' Kid is a 1923 American silent Western film directed by Edward Sedgwick and featuring Hoot Gibson and Laura La Plante. It was based on the novel The Ramblin' Kid by Earl Wayland Bowman. The novel would later be filmed as a talkie in The Long Long Trail (1929) which also starred Gibson.

== Cast ==
- Hoot Gibson as The Ramblin' Kid
- Laura La Plante as Carolyn June
- Harold Goodwin as Skinny Rawlins
- William Welsh as Lafe Dorsey
- W.T. McCulley as Sheriff Tom Poole
- Charles K. French as Joshua Heck
- G. Raymond Nye as Mike Sabota
- Carol Holloway as Mrs. Ophelia Cobb
- George King as Sing Pete

== Censorship ==
Before The Ramblin' Kid could be exhibited in Kansas, the Kansas Board of Review required the elimination of an intertitle saying "You must be pretty well acquainted with Heck's niece, etc."

== Preservation ==
A print of The Ramblin' Kid is located at EYE Film Institute Netherlands.

== See also ==
- Hoot Gibson filmography
