= Harry A. Pollard =

Actor, film director, screenwriter

Harry Adolphus Pollard
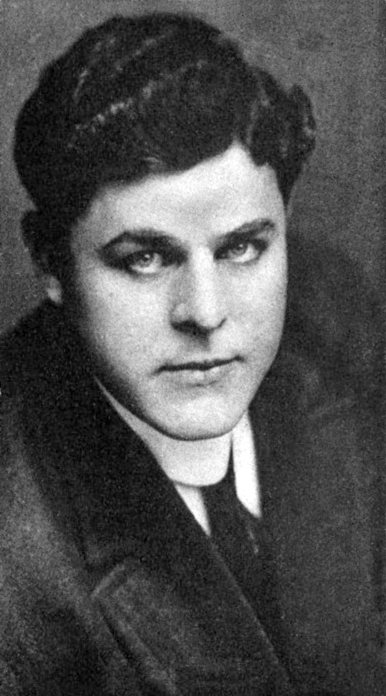
- Pollard in 1914
- Born: 23 January 1879; Republic, Kansas, U.S.
- Died: 6 July 1934 (aged 55); Pasadena, California, U.S.
- Years active: 1912–1932
- Spouse: Margarita Fischer (m.1911)

Harry Adolphus Pollard (23 January 1879 – 6 July 1934) was an American silent film actor and director. His wife was silent screen star Margarita Fischer.

== Biography ==
Harry Adolphus Pollard was born in Republic, Kansas, and began his career on the stage. In 1912 he joined the Selig Polyscope Company and starred in many of its motion pictures. He began directing films in 1913, and eventually stopped performing. His wife was actress Margarita Fischer, who starred in many of his films.

Pollard died in Pasadena, California, on 6 July 1934, aged 55, after a brief illness.

== Select filmography ==
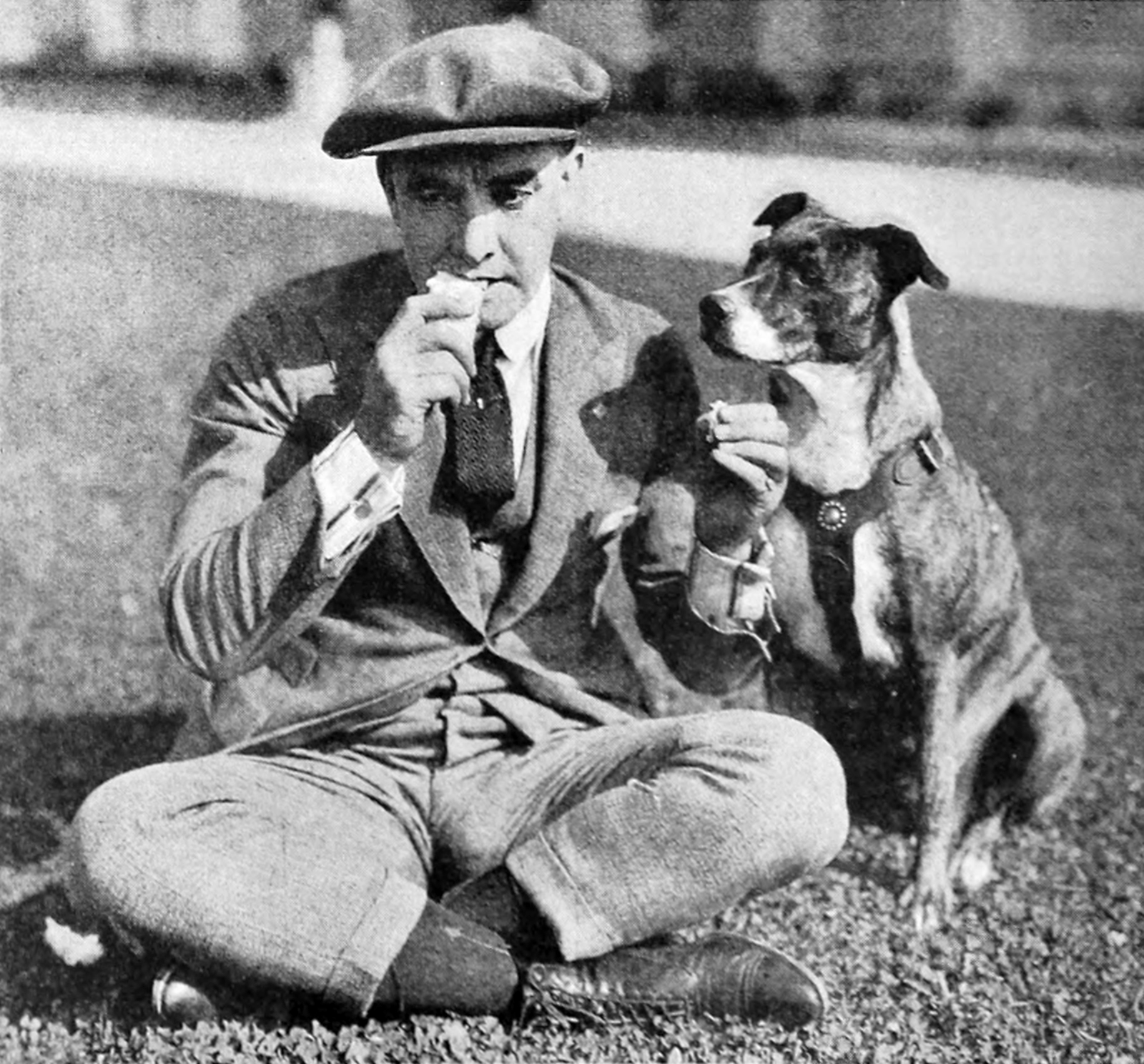
Director Pollard on a lunch break, 1921

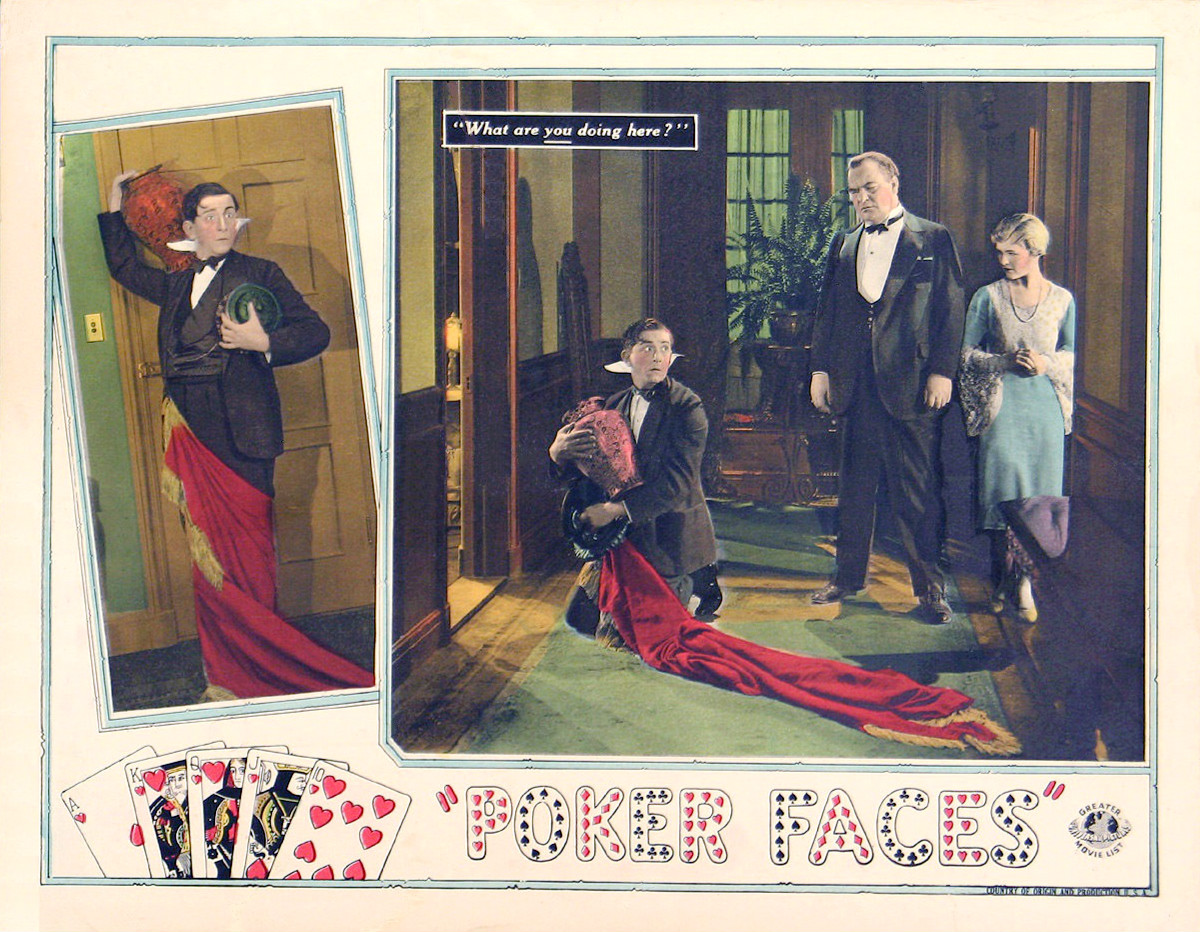
Lobby card for Poker Faces (1926)

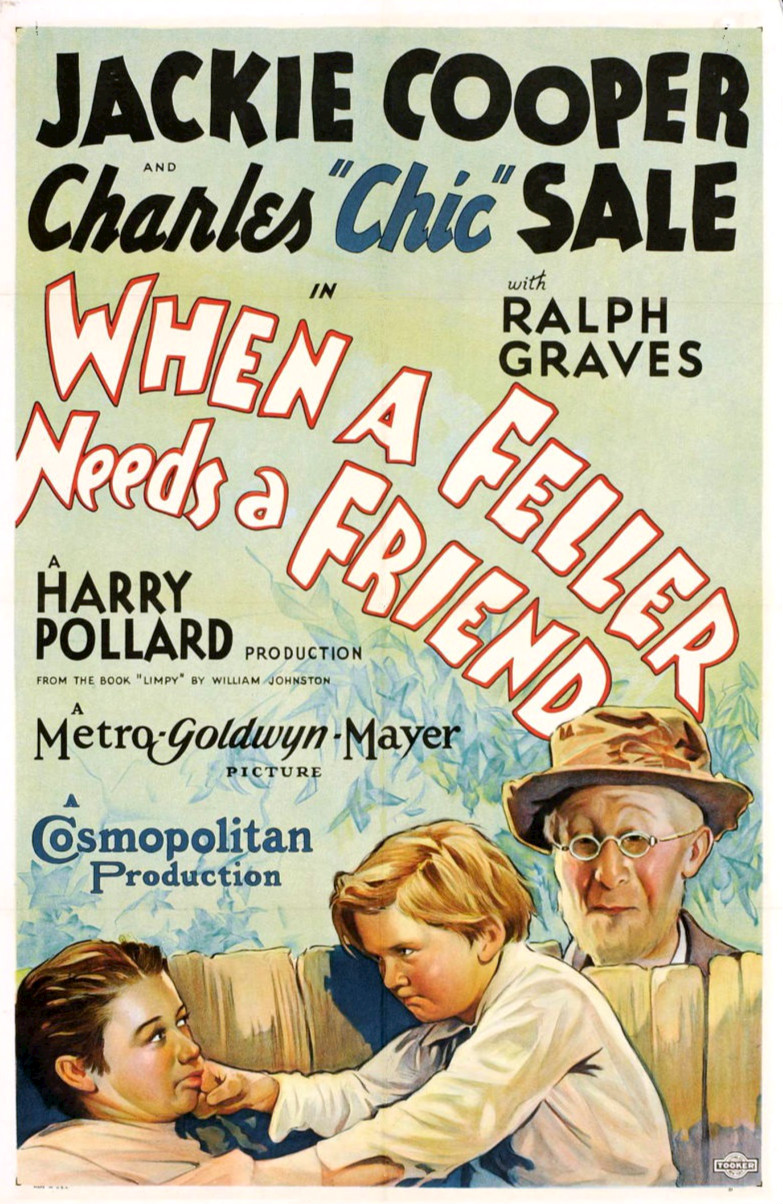
Poster for When a Feller Needs a Friend (1932)

=== Actor ===
- On the Shore (1912)
- The Worth of a Man (1912)
- Jim's Atonement (1912)
- Nothing Shall Be Hidden (1912)
- Hearts in Conflict (1912)
- Uncle Tom's Cabin (1913)
- The Peacock Feather Fan (1914)
- Susie's New Shoes (1914)
- The Quest (1914)
- Infatuation (1915)
- The Pearl of Paradise (1916)

=== Director ===
- The Peacock Feather Fan (1914)
- Motherhood (1914)
- The Quest (1914)
- Break, Break, Break (1914)
- The Girl from His Town (1915)
- Infatuation (1915)
- The Miracle of Life (1915)
- The Dragon (1916)
- The Pearl of Paradise (1916)
- The Devil's Assistant (1917)
- The Girl Who Couldn't Grow Up (1917)
- The Danger Game (1918)
- Which Woman? (1918)
- The Invisible Ray (1920)
- Trimmed (1922)
- The Loaded Door (1922)
- Confidence (1922)
- Trifling with Honor (1923)
- Sporting Youth (1924)
- The Reckless Age (1924)
- K – The Unknown (1924)
- Oh Doctor! (1925)
- I'll Show You the Town (1925)
- California Straight Ahead (1925)
- The Cohens and Kellys (1926)
- Poker Faces (1926)
- Uncle Tom's Cabin (1927)
- Show Boat (1929)
- Tonight at Twelve (1929)
- Undertow (1930)
- Shipmates (1931)
- The Prodigal (1931)
- When a Feller Needs a Friend (1932)
- Fast Life (1932)
