= How to Handle Women =

1928 film

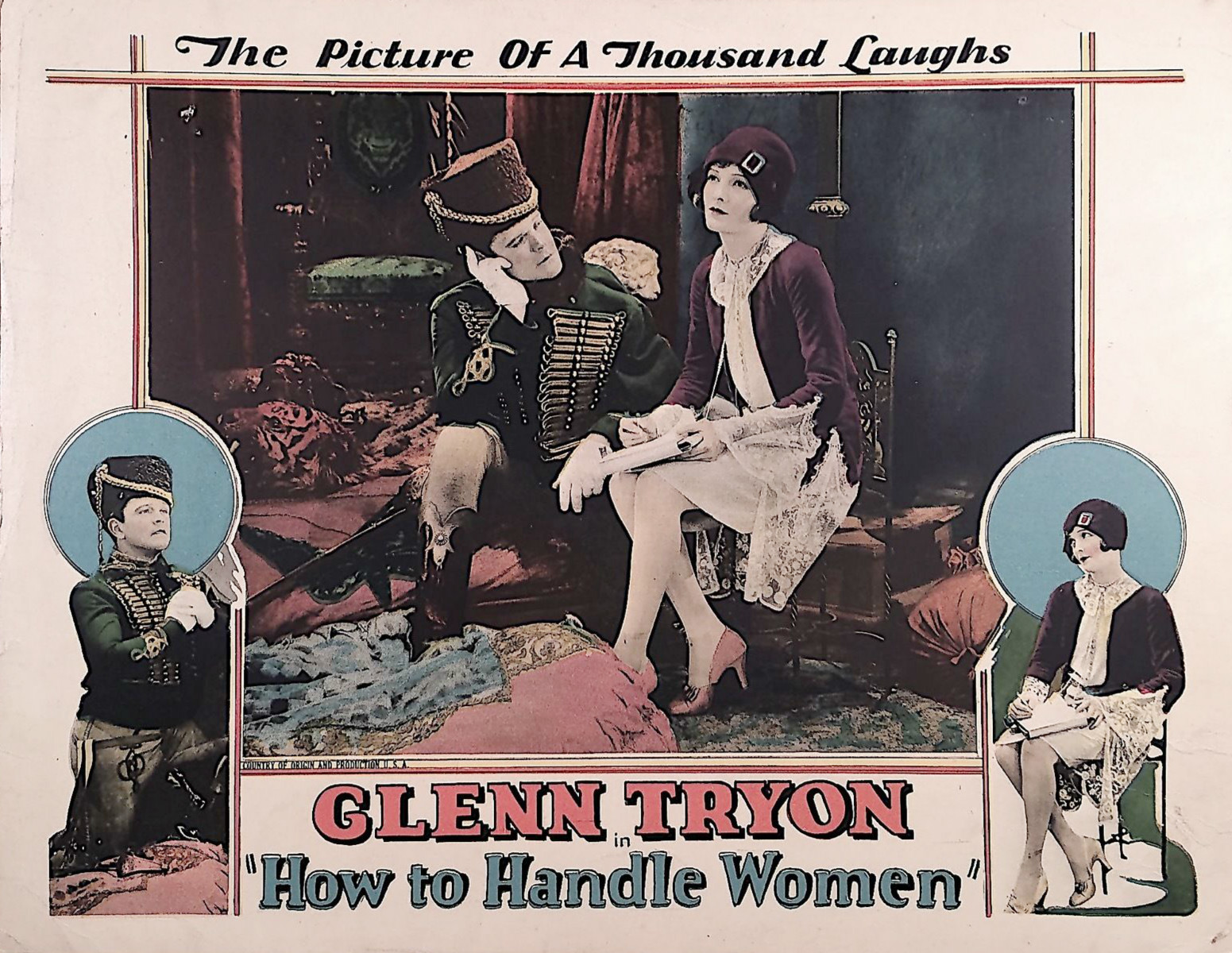
- Lobby card
- Directed by: William James Craft
- Written by: Carl Krusada (scenario); Jack Foley (adaptation); Albert DeMond (intertitles)
- Story by: William James Craft; Jack Foley
- Produced by: Carl Laemmle
- Starring: Glenn Tryon; Bela Lugosi; Bull Montana; Cesare Gravina; Marian Nixon
- Cinematography: Arthur L. Todd
- Edited by: Charles Craft
- Distributed by: Universal Pictures
- Release date: October 14, 1928
- Running time: 60 minutes
- Country: United States
- Language: Silent (English intertitles)

How to Handle Women is a 1928 American silent comedy film directed by William James Craft and starring Glenn Tryon. His first Hollywood film, Bela Lugosi had a brief uncredited role as a diplomatic aide, and Krazy Kat cartoonist George Herriman played himself in a cameo appearance. It also featured Bull Montana, and Cesare Gravina. It was produced and distributed by Universal Pictures. The film had several working titles: Fresh Every Hour, The Prince of Peanuts, Meet the Prince, The Prince of Knuts and Three Days.

== Plot ==
Leonard Higgins, a young up-and-coming New York cartoonist, meets Prince Hendryx, the ruler of Vulgaria who is visiting the United States trying to persuade some wealthy businessmen to invest in his tiny country. Higgins decides to help the Prince by using his cartooning skills to advertise Vulgaria's peanut crop, which in reality does not exist. Higgins invites a number of wealthy people to a fancy banquet at the Vulgarian Embassy. The gimmick is that each course of the dinner is to be made entirely from peanuts, including the soup, steaks, desserts, etc. and all of them taste horrible. Meanwhile, the evil Count Olaff shows up to sabotage the dinner, so that he can depose Prince Hendryx and become the ruler of Vulgaria. Higgins impersonates the Prince and hosts the banquet himself. As a bonus, Higgins winds up winning the affections of the lovely Beatrice Fairbanks in the end.

== Cast ==
- Glenn Tryon as Leonard Higgins
- Marian Nixon as Beatrice Fairbanks
- Raymond Keane as Prince Hendryx
- Mario Carillo as Count Olaf
- George Herriman as himself (credited as E. H. Harriman)
- Bull Montana as The Turk
- Cesare Gravina as Tony
- Robert T. Haines as The Editor
- Leo White as The Secretary
- Violet La Plante as The Stenographer
- Bela Lugosi as Diplomat's Aide (uncredited)

== Preservation ==
The Library of Congress has a "digital file containing a 300-foot 16mm fragment from one reel (reel one) lent by a collector".
