= Infatuation (1915 film) =

1915 film directed by Harry A. Pollard

- Directed by: Harry A. Pollard
- Written by: Mary H. O'Connor
- Based on: novel Infatuation by Lloyd Osbourne c.1909
- Produced by: American Film Company
- Starring: Margarita Fischer
- Distributed by: Mutual Film Company
- Release date: September 2, 1915
- Running time: 4 reels
- Country: USA
- Language: Silent...English intertitles

Infatuation is a lost 1915 silent film directed by Harry A. Pollard and starring his wife Margarita Fischer. It was distributed through the Mutual Film Company.

== Cast ==
- Margarita Fischer - Phyllis Ladd
- Harry A. Pollard - Cyril Adair
- Joseph Singleton - John Ladd (*Joseph E. Singleton)
- Lucille Ward - Mrs. Fenshaw
