= Poker Faces =

1926 film by Harry A. Pollard

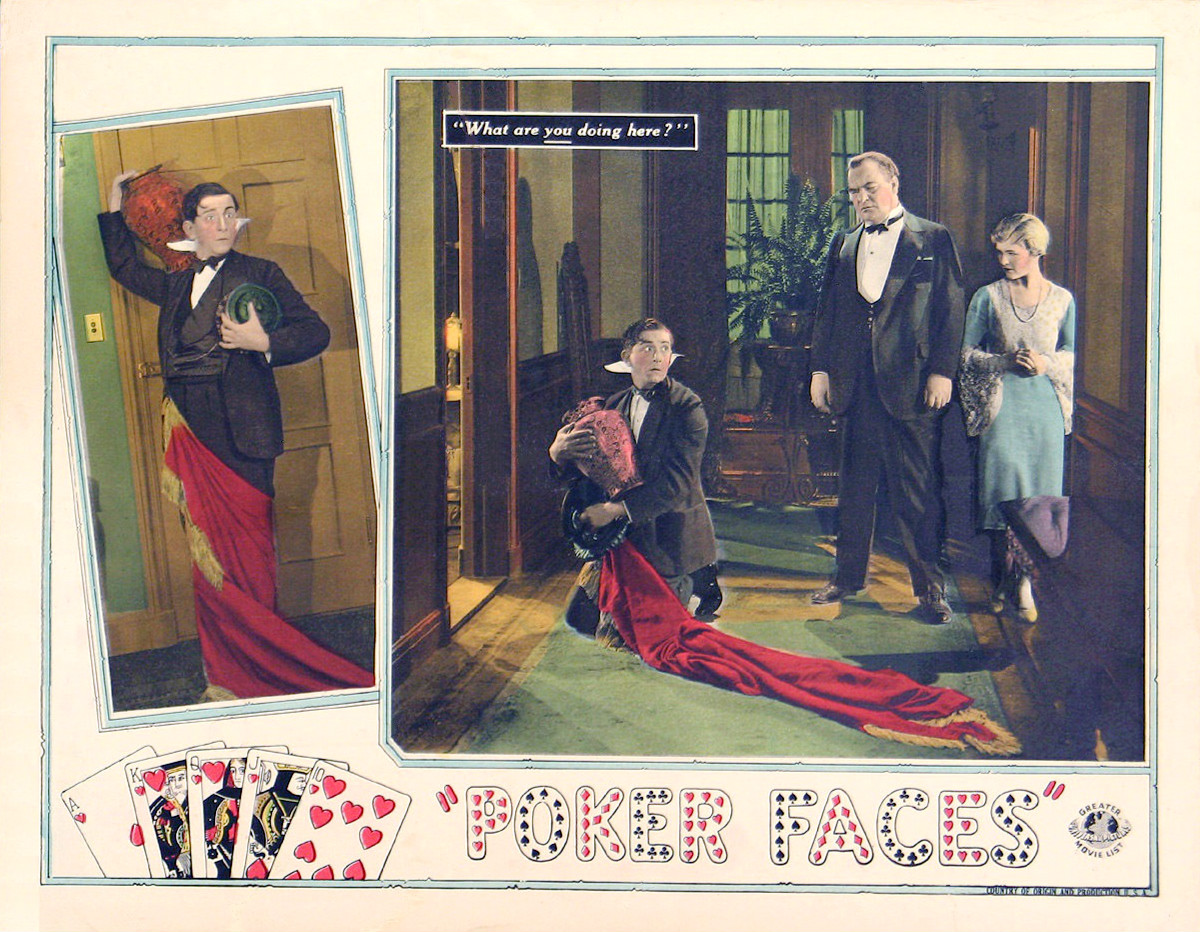
- Lobby card
- Directed by: Harry A. Pollard
- Written by: Melville W. Brown
- Story by: Edgar Franklin
- Produced by: Carl Laemmle
- Starring: Edward Everett Horton; Laura La Plante
- Cinematography: Charles Stumar
- Distributed by: Universal Pictures
- Release date: September 5, 1926
- Running time: 80 minutes
- Country: United States
- Language: Silent (English intertitles)

Poker Faces is a 1926 American silent comedy film directed by Harry A. Pollard starring Edward Everett Horton and Laura La Plante. It was produced and released by Universal Pictures on September 5, 1926.

== Plot ==
As described in a film magazine, Jimmy Whitmore, torn between having his wife constantly remind him that they need a new rug and enduring the unkind remarks of his employer Henry Curlew, maintains the unemotional stone visage which has gained for him the name, “Poker Face Whitmore,” and it turns out that the boss has testing him to see if he could stand a real strain without showing his feelings. Curlew assigns him the job of landing a contract with George Dixon, a tough customer. Dixon and Jimmie are both invited to the Curlew house that evening. When Dixon tells Jimmie to be sure to bring his wife, Jimmie despairs when he reads a note from his wife stating that she has gone to work to earn money to buy a new rug. Jimmie calls a casting agency and hires the pretty wife of a jealous prize fighter to pose as his wife for the evening. At Curlew's home they meet Dixon and Curlew's new secretary, who turns out to be Jimmie's real wife. Dixon plans to dictate some letters at his hotel but Curlew offers him the use of his secretary if he will stay all night, as he does not want to let the prospective buyer leave. Curlew then stampedes Jimmie and his “wife” to a bedroom against their protests as the hired wife wants to get back to her husband and Jimmie wants to explain everything to his wife. The irrepressible Jimmie makes repeated attempts to reach his wife so Dixon forces him to take off his clothes, pushes him back in the room with the fighter's wife, and locks the door and puts the key in his pocket. The fighter, anxious about his wife, sees her in the lighted room and climbs up to the window. Seeing his wife in the room with a man in his BVDs, he furiously attacks Jimmie, who escapes when Dixon opens the door. After a long chase around the house Jimmie is cornered in Dixon's room, so he switches off the light and hides. Dixon and the fighter come to blows by mistake and are both knocked out. Jimmie jumps out just as cops arrive and batter down the door. Curlew receives a telegram advising him to arrest Dixon, who is a crook. Jimmie is rewarded for his astuteness and bravery by being taken into the firm as junior partner.

== Cast ==
- Edward Everett Horton as Jimmy Whitmore
- Laura La Plante as Betty Whitmore
- George Siegmann as George Dixon
- Tom Ricketts as Henry Curlew
- Tom O'Brien as Pug
- Dorothy Revier as Pug's Wife
- Leon Holmes as Office Boy

== Preservation ==
A print of Poker Faces is preserved in the George Eastman Museum Motion Picture Collection, the Library of Congress, and UCLA Film & Television Archive.
