= Lightnin' Shot =

1928 film

- Directed by: J.P. McGowan
- Written by: Victor Rousseau; J.P. McGowan
- Produced by: Trem Carr
- Starring: Buddy Roosevelt
- Cinematography: Hap Depew
- Edited by: Erma Horsley
- Production company: Trem Carr Pictures
- Distributed by: Rayart Pictures
- Release date: September 23, 1928
- Running time: 50 minutes
- Country: United States
- Languages: Silent; English intertitles

Lightnin' Shot is a 1928 American silent Western film directed by J.P. McGowan and starring Buddy Roosevelt.

== Cast ==
- Buddy Roosevelt
- J.P. McGowan
- Frank Earle
- Carol Lane
- Jimmy Kane
- Tommy Bay
- Art Rowlands
