= Buddy Roosevelt =

Actor and stunt man

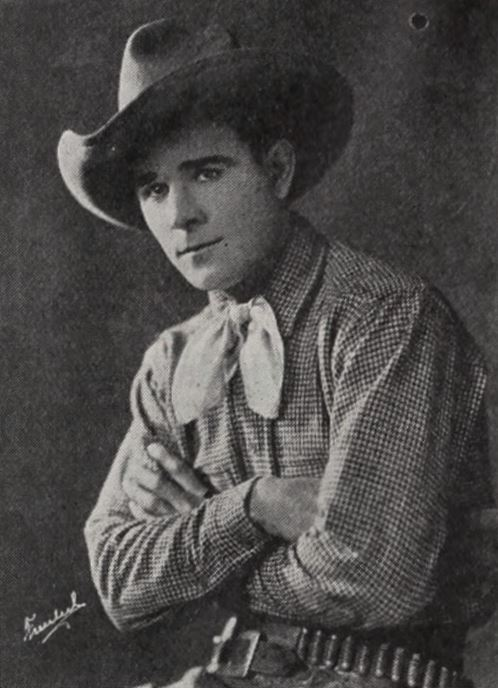
- Roosevelt in 1930
- Born: Kenneth Stanhope Sanderson; June 25, 1898; Meeker, Rio Blanco County; Colorado, U.S.
- Died: October 6, 1973 (aged 75); Meeker, Colorado, U.S.
- Resting place: Highland Cemetery, Meeker, Colorado, U.S.
- Occupation: Actor
- Years active: 1922–1962

Buddy Roosevelt (born Kenneth Stanhope Sanderson; June 25, 1898 – October 6, 1973) was an American film and television actor and stunt performer from Hollywood's early silent film years through the 1950s.

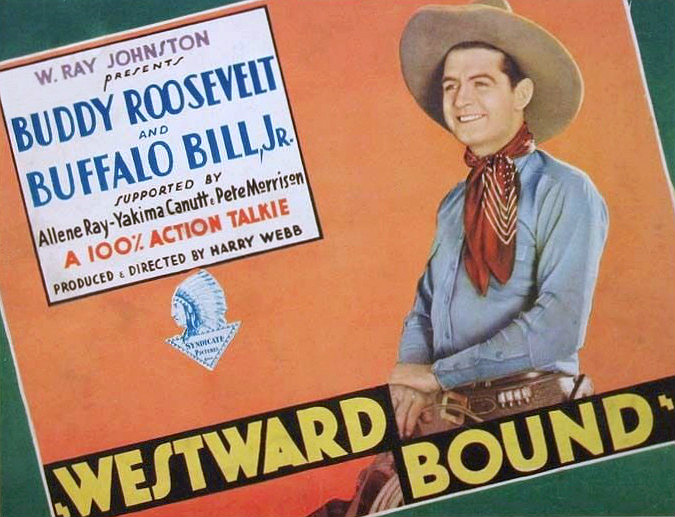
Roosevelt in Westward Bound

== Biography ==
Roosevelt was born as Kenneth Stanhope Sanderson in Meeker in Rio Blanco County in northwestern Colorado. His father was a judge. Roosevelt learned to ride as a child.

Before his film career, he joined the C. B. Irwin Wild West Show. He started performing as a stuntman in 1916, his first work being on the film Hell's Hinges. He continued working as a stuntman as well as an actor throughout his long Hollywood career.

Roosevelt served in the United States Navy during World War I. Although it has been said that he served aboard the USS Norfolk, and that it was sunk during that war, no record of a USS Norfolk being in service during World War I has been found.

After World War I, Roosevelt returned to Hollywood to perform stunts in films as notable as The Sheik, the 1921 movie classic starring Rudolph Valentino and for which Valentino would become most remembered. Roosevelt's first acting role was in the 1924 film Down in Texas. He would star in thirty-seven films from 1924 to 1929, most of which were western films. He made a successful transition to "talking films", mainly because of his abilities as a stuntman.

In 1930, he appeared alongside William Haines and Leila Hyams in Way Out West, which continued him on the path of western film roles, mostly in Poverty Row films but he also made small or uncredited appearances in major films. During the 1930s he appeared in 66 films—some in which he both acted and did stunt work—almost all being westerns, and appeared with such notable actors and actresses as Harry Carey, Hoot Gibson, Gloria Stuart, Joel McCrea, Edward G. Robinson, Bette Davis, and Humphrey Bogart. He also was a frequent stand in for Ronald Colman beginning with Clive of India (1935).

In 1939 he both performed stunts and had a minor role in the Claire Trevor-John Wayne classic Stagecoach, and in 1940 he appeared, uncredited, again with John Wayne in The Man from Dakota, in which he also performed stunts. Throughout the 1940s he both appeared in or performed stunts in 32 films, most notably alongside Randolph Scott and Lloyd Bridges in Abilene Town.

During World War II he interrupted his film career by enlisting in the U.S. Coast Guard.

In the 1950s, he appeared in sixty-five episodes as an unnamed townsman on the ABC/Desilu television series, The Life and Legend of Wyatt Earp.

From 1950 through 1962 he appeared in or perform stunts in thirty-six films and two television series. In 1957 he appeared uncredited as a Townsman in The Lonely Man, in again in 1959 Bat Masterson. He retired after 1962 with his last appearance being uncredited in the John Wayne and James Stewart film The Man Who Shot Liberty Valance.

He returned home to Meeker, Colorado, where he was living at the time of his death on October 6, 1973, at the age of seventy-five.

== Partial filmography ==
- Smilin' Through (1922)
- Rough Ridin' (1924)
- Walloping Wallace (1924)
- Lure of the Yukon (1924)
- Battling Buddy (1924)
- Action Galore (1925)
- Gold and Grit (1925)
- Fast Fightin' (1925)
- Reckless Courage (1925)
- The Bandit Buster (1926)
- The Dangerous Dub (1926)
- The Ramblin' Galoot (1926)
- The Twin Triggers (1926)
- The Fightin' Comeback (1927)
- Between Dangers (1927)
- The Phantom Buster (1927)
- Ride 'em High (1927)
- Napoleon's Barber (1928)
- The Devil's Tower (1928)
- Trailin' Back (1928)
- Lightnin' Shot (1928)
- The Cowboy Cavalier (1928)
- Trail Riders (1928)
- Mystery Valley (1928)
- The Painted Trail (1928)
- Strong Boy (1929)
- Way Out West (1930)
- Westward Bound (1930)
- The Riding Kid (1931)
- Dishonored (1931)
- Lightnin' Smith Returns (1931)
- Valley of Badmen (1931)
- The Fourth Horseman (1932)
- Vanity Street (1932)
- Circle Canyon (1933)
- Lightning Range (1933)
- Boss Cowboy (1934)
- Circle Canyon (1934)
- Men Without Names (1935)
- Rainbow's End (1935)
- Powdersmoke Range (1935)
- Captain Blood (1935)
- General Spanky (1936)
- Dick Tracy (1937)
- Ambush (1939)
- Billy the Kid's Range War (1941)
- Holt of the Secret Service (1941)
- The Lone Rider Rides On (1941)
- Badman's Territory (1946)
- The Inspector General (1949)
- Dead or Alive (1951)
- Fargo (1952)
- The Old West (1952)
- Reprisal! (1956)
- The Fastest Gun Alive (1956) (uncredited)
- Shoot Out at Big Sag (1962) (uncredited)
- The Man Who Shot Liberty Valance (1962)
