= Leroy Scott =

American writer

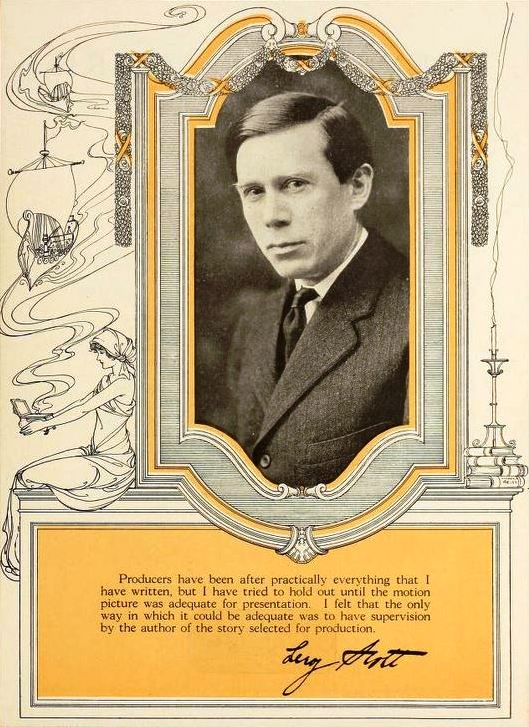
- Scott in a 1919 ad
- Born: May 11, 1875; Fairmont, Indiana
- Died: July 21, 1929 (aged 54); Merrill, New York
- Occupation: Writer
- Known for: Novels, Screenplays
- Spouse: Miriam Finn

Leroy Scott (May 11, 1875 – July 21, 1929) was an American writer of novels and screenplays. Scott was involved in social activism and founded the Intercollegiate Socialist Society, an unofficial student wing of the Socialist Party of America.

== Biography ==
Scott was born in Fairmount, Indiana, on 11 May 1875. His father was a minister with the Religious Society of Friends. He graduated from Indiana University Bloomington in 1897. His writing career began with three years of experience as a reporter; he worked at a Louisiana newspaper owned by his brother. Later (1900–01) he became assistant editor of the Woman’s Home Companion.

Scott was also a social activist. After gaining experience at the Hull House in Chicago, Scott served as assistant headworker at the University Settlement House in New York City in 1902–03. It was there that he met—and later married on 27 June 1904—Miriam Finn, a Russian Jewish writer. Around this same time Scott was an officer of the Intercollegiate Socialist Society, of which he was a founder. After his departure from the University Settlement, Scott and his wife came to live in Greenwich Village at "A Club", a writers' cooperative housed in an old mansion on Fifth Avenue that became known as a "radical center." They had one child, a daughter.

In 1906, Scott helped arrange accommodations for Maxim Gorky during his visit to the United States. In 1907, Scott and his wife visited Russia.

To research his book about labor relations, The Walking Delegate (1905), Scott joined the Structural Iron Workers Union.

In addition to novels, Scott became involved in the movie industry, where he accumulated numerous writing credits, as well as an acting credit in one film. When Goldwyn Pictures determined a need to produce movies in New York as well as on the west coast, Scott's Partners of the Night was chosen as the first work.

Scott drowned in Lake Chateaugay, near Plattsburgh, New York, on 21 July 1929.

== Works ==
- The Walking Delegate (1905)
- To Him that Hath (1907)
- The Shears of Destiny (1910)
- Vocations, ed. William DeWitt Hyde. Hall and Locke Company. Boston. Vol. 1. The Mechanic Arts. Richard C. Maclauren ed. (1911). “Selden’s Explosion Buggy”. p. 343
- Counsel for the Defense (1912)
- No. 13 Washington Square (1914)
- Graft (1915)
- Partners of the Night (1916)
- The Sturdy Oak; a composite novel of American politics by fourteen American authors (ch xiv) (1917)
- Mary Regan (1918)
- A Daughter of Two Worlds: A Novel of New York Life (1919)
- Children of the Whirlwind (1921)
- Cordelia the Magnificent (1923)
- The Heart of Katie O”Doone (1925)
- Folly’s Gold (1926)
- The Trail of Glory (1926)
- The Living Dead Man (1929)
