= Raymond Douglas Turner =

American actor (c. 1895 – 1981)

Raymond Turner
- Born: October 28, 1895; Roswell, New Mexico, U.S.
- Died: August 18, 1981 (aged 85); Los Angeles County, U.S.
- Occupation: Actor
- Spouses: Caffie Thompson; Shirley Turner

Raymond Douglas Turner (1895?–1981) also known as Ray Turner was an American actor.

Turner worked as a motion picture actor from the silent era through to the talkies, appearing in as many as 500 films. In the late 1920s, he was a featured player at First National Pictures.

== Biography ==
Turner was born in Roswell, New Mexico on 28 October 1895 (?) (see #Note about Turner's birth date, below).

Turner's arrival in Hollywood is recounted in two slightly different ways: in one version he drove his employer from New Mexico to California and decided to stay, alternating between chauffeur work and acting until his screen career was secure. In an alternative version of events recounted to Buddy Mason of The Afro-American newspaper in 1930, Turner was a ranch worker in New Mexico who used his last savings to travel to Hollywood because of his love of films and desire to be an actor. In this version of events, Turner became a Chauffeur for the producer Al Rockett, before winning a comedic part as a cook in J.P. McGowan's film Hills of Missing Men (1922).

From 1924 Turner became a regular in the supporting cast of Western and other adventure films starring Maurice Bennett ("Lefty") Flynn, at F.B.O. Studios. As George Katcher (2002) points out, with the odds stacked against African-American actors as they were in early Hollywood, Turner had to have been talented to get where he was. Many of the films Turner made with Flynn are now considered to be lost films.

In the latter half of the 1920s, Turner had featured parts in several First National films in which Richard Barthelmess was the lead, beginning with The Patent Leather Kid (1927). Turner's character in The Patent Leather Kid, Mabile Molasses, is boxer Barthelmess' sparring partner and part of his ring side team. Turner is introduced with an intertitle card and an actor credit. Charlene Regester (1997) notes that although this role might seem like an advancement for an African-American actor, Turner's character was still marginalized by being given a stereotypical name.

After the success of The Patent Leather Kid, for which Barthelmess was Academy Award nominated as best actor, Barthelmess came to regard Turner as a lucky mascot in his movies: "Barthelmess considers Turner's presence a welcome promise of good luck." In 1929 a survey conducted by the Central Casting Association and the Motion Picture Producers Association analysed the Barthelmess film Weary River, which had a supporting role for Turner: Dan Kelley (then casting director of First National) supplied the information that Turner was one of about 100 actors at the studio who were considered valuable at the box-office.

In the First National romantic drama The Love Mart (1927) Turner played Poupet, the manservant of Victor Jallot (played by Gilbert Roland). Poupet was a comic relief character. Turner's work was well-reviewed, although his part was small: "Raymond Turner, 'the dark spot' in the picture, is nevertheless the lightest spot in the picture. His natural comedy is refreshing and despite the fact that the story is designed to make him a character of no importance, this young player stands out prominently and his work has been well received by Lowe State Audiences." The Love Mart is a lost film.

In the late 1920s Turner suffered from a serious bout of food poisoning which left him hospitalized for months, and he lost most of his possessions. Released from hospital with no money, Turner took a job as a janitor in an apartment house and relied on food given to him by residents until he could get paid. At one point Turner found himself lining a waste basket with newspaper bearing his picture, with a review for one of his films – the review of his performance was good, and he later said: 'a little bit of encouragement to a man who is down can sure make him keep going, even if it comes out of a garbage pail.'

In 1939 Turner married Katherine Thompson, known as Caffie (1919–2010). Caffie worked as a beauty operator, and opened a desegregated hair salon while she and Turner were married: she later became a prominent Civil Rights advocate and community organiser, better known by her later married name Caffie Greene. Turner and Caffie had one son together. Their marriage ended in divorce in about 1950.

Turner served in WW2 and achieved the rank of TEC 4. He was initially stationed at Camp Stoneman, near Pittsburg, California.

== Partial filmography ==
- Hills of Missing Men (1922) – Cook [no copies of the film are known to survive]
- The No-Gun Man (1924) – Obediah Abraham Lincoln Brown [no copies of the film are known to survive]
- Speed Wild (1925) – Ulysses [no copies of the film are known to survive]
- Smilin' at Trouble (1925) – Colored Boy [a copy of the film exists in the archive at Cinematheque Royale de Belgique]
- O.U. West (1925) – Porter
- Heads Up (1925) – Zeke [no copies of the film are known to survive]
- Sir Lumberjack (1926) – Cook [no copies of the film are known to survive ]
- The Traffic Cop (1926) – Tapioca [no copies of the film are known to survive]
- The Patent Leather Kid (1927) – Mabile Molasses
- The Love Mart (1927) – Poupet [no copies of the film are known to survive]
- The Valley of the Giants (1927) – unknown role (uncredited) [copies exist at the Library of Congress and UCLA archive]
- Kit Carson (1928) – Smokey [a copy of the film exists in the archive at Cinemateket-Svenska Filminstitutet (Stockholm)]
- A Thief in the Dark (1928) – Beauregard [no copies of the film are known to survive]
- Synthetic Sin (1929) – Sam
- Weary River (1929) – Elevator Operator
- Young Nowheres (1929) – George [the film's status is unknown and it may be lost]
- King Kong (1933) – Native (uncredited)
- The Captain Hates the Sea (1934) – Sam (uncredited)
- Test Pilot (1938) – unknown role (uncredited)
- They Got Me Covered (1943) – Hubert (uncredited)
- Cabin in the Sky (1943) – unknown role (uncredited)

== Note about Turner's birth date ==
Turner's date of birth varies in different sources. His memorial marker at Riverside National Cemetery gives a date of 28 October 1895. Turner's WW2 Draft Card gives a date of 28 October 1902 (The draft was for men born on or after February 17, 1897, and before 31 December 1921, so possibly Turner gave a younger birth date in order to be eligible). In a 1928 Amarillo Globe column and his 1930 Afro-American profile Turner's age is given as 24 and then 26 (so born c. 1904), and the 1940 US Census Turner gives his age as 34 (so born c.1906). On the 1950 US Census Turner gives his age as 39 (so born c. 1911).
