= Our Leading Citizen =

Our Leading Citizen may refer to:

- Our Leading Citizen (1922 film), directed by Alfred E. Green
- Our Leading Citizen (1939 film), directed by Alfred Santell
