= The Loudspeaker =

- Julie Bishop and Ray Walker (1934)
- Directed by: Joseph Santley
- Written by: Albert DeMond (screenplay); Ralph Spence (dialogue and story)
- Produced by: William T. Lackey (producer)
- Starring: See below
- Cinematography: Gilbert Warrenton
- Edited by: Jack Ogilvie
- Distributed by: Monogram Pictures
- Release date: June 1, 1934
- Running time: 67 minutes
- Country: United States
- Language: English

The Loudspeaker is a 1934 American comedy film directed by Joseph Santley.

The film is also known as The Radio Star in the United Kingdom.

== Plot summary ==
Wisecracking Joe Miller (Ray Walker) makes it to the big time in radio.

When he gives his girlfriend Janet (Julie Bishop) her big break, she becomes an even bigger star. He feels like the joke's on him, when she starts going out with his friend George (Lorin Raker); and, he turns to booze, for comfort.

Whether Joe can crawl back up, out of the bottle; or, if Janet, or the sponsors and audience will take him back, remains to be seen.

== Cast ==
- Ray Walker as Joe Miller
- Julie Bishop as Janet Melrose
- Charley Grapewin as Pop Calloway
- Noel Francis as Dolly
- Lorin Raker as George Green
- Spencer Charters as Burroughs
- Larry Wheat as Thomas
- Mary Carr as Grandma
- Ruth Romaine as Amy Witherspoon
- Billy Irvin as Caleb Hawkins
- Eddie Kane
- Wilbur Mack as Walker
- Sherwood Bailey as Ignatz
- The Brownies Trio as Vocal Ensemble

== Soundtrack ==
- Jacqueline Wells (dubbed) - "Who But You" (Written by Harry Akst and Lew Brown)
- Jacqueline Wells (dubbed) - "Doo Ah Doo Ah Know What I'm Doing" (Written by Harry Akst and Lew Brown)
