= Hossein Lankarani =

Iranian Ayatollah (1895–1989)

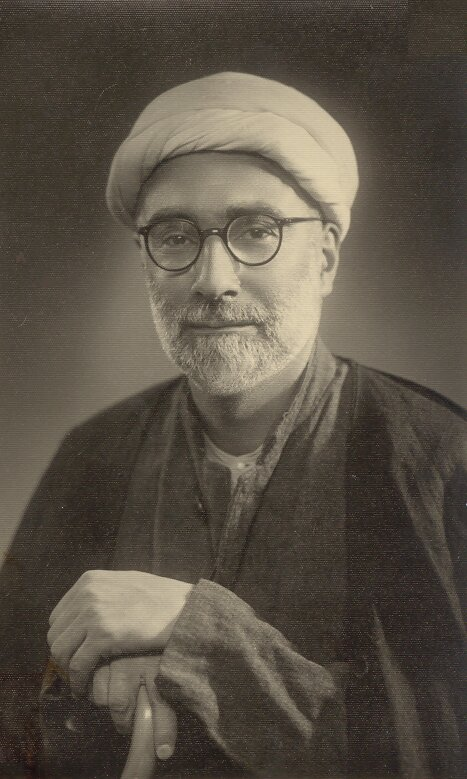
- Ayatollah Sheikh Hossein Lankarani.

Member of Parliament of Iran
- In office 7 March 1944 – 12 March 1946
- Constituency: Ardabil

Personal details
- Born: 1895 Tehran, Iran
- Died: c. 1989 (aged 93–94)

Hossein Lankarani (Persian: حسین لنکرانی) was an Iranian Shia cleric and politician who served as a member of parliament in the 14th Iranian Majlis.

Prynce Hopkins describes Lankarani as "liberal". According to Sepehr Zabih, during 1943 Iranian election in Azerbaijan, the Soviet Union favored to get Lankarani elected and banished his rival from the city to ensure his success, due to the fact he was known to oppose the ruling class in Tehran and advocated friendship towards the Soviets.
