= Ray Turner =

Ray or Raymond Turner may refer to:

- Ray Turner (computer scientist) (born 1947), English computer scientist
- Ray Turner (artist) (born 1958), American artist
- Ray Turner (basketball) (born 1990), American basketball player
- Ray Turner (pianist) (1903–1976), American pianist
- Raymond Douglas Turner (1895?–1981), American actor
