= Lillian Mobley =

American activist (1930–2011)

Lillian Mobley (1930–2011) was an American community activist. She was active in the African-American community of South Los Angeles and was instrumental in the establishment of a major hospital in the neighborhood. According to U.S. Representative Maxine Waters, she was "the most accomplished and successful community activist South Los Angeles has ever had."

== Biography ==
Lillian Harkless was born to Charlie and Corene Harkless on March 29, 1930, in Macon, Georgia. In 1948, she graduated from Macon's Hudson High School and married James Otis Mobley. Mobley and her husband moved to California three years later.

Over the course of her life, she served on the boards of over 20 organizations, in fields including education, healthcare, water ratemaking, and services for the elderly.

She is particularly known for her involvement in the establishment of Martin Luther King Hospital. The McCone Commission convened after the 1965 Watts riots identified deficiencies in health services available in South Los Angeles and made recommendations for improvements in these services. As part of implementing these recommendations, Mobley, along with Mary Henry, Caffie Greene, Johnnie Taylor, and Nola Carter, pushed for the establishment of a major hospital in South Los Angeles. Their effort culminated in the opening of Martin Luther King Hospital in 1972. The same activists were a driving force behind the 1966 establishment of the Charles R. Drew University of Medicine and Science, a historically black graduate institution in South Los Angeles.

In 1983, she established the South Central Multipurpose Senior Citizen's Center, now called the Lillian Mobley Multipurpose Center, in South Los Angeles.

Mobley had four children: Corene, Charles, Kenneth, and Phillip. She died on July 18, 2011.
