= The Traffic Cop =

1926 film by Harry Garson

- Directed by: Harry Garson
- Written by: Gerald Beaumont; John Grey; James Gruen; Rob Wagner
- Starring: Maurice 'Lefty' Flynn; Kathleen Myers; Nigel Barrie
- Cinematography: Gilbert Warrenton
- Production company: Robertson-Cole Pictures Corporation
- Distributed by: Film Booking Offices of America
- Release date: January 17, 1926
- Running time: 50 minutes
- Country: United States
- Language: Silent (English intertitles)

The Traffic Cop is a 1926 American silent drama film directed by Harry Garson and starring Maurice 'Lefty' Flynn, Kathleen Myers, and Nigel Barrie.

== Plot ==
As described in a film magazine review, Joe Regan, a young traffic officer who has adopted an orphaned boy, takes his charge to a seaside resort to help him recuperate from an injury. There he meets Alicia Davidson, a young woman whom he has met in the line of duty, and a warm friendship develops. The young woman's father one night becomes intoxicated while in the company of the policeman, and the latter is blamed. However, Alicia relents, and when the policeman saves her and others from death, she promises to become his wife.

== Cast ==
- Maurice 'Lefty' Flynn as Joe Regan
- Kathleen Myers as Alicia Davidson
- James A. Marcus as Radcliffe Davidson
- Adele Farrington as Mrs. Davidson
- Ray Ripley as Marmalade Laidlaw
- Nigel Barrie as Harvey Phillips
- Ray Turner as Tapioca

== Bibliography ==
- Munden, Kenneth White. The American Film Institute Catalog of Motion Pictures Produced in the United States, Part 1. University of California Press, 1997.
