= Kate Rolla =

American opera singer (1859–1925)

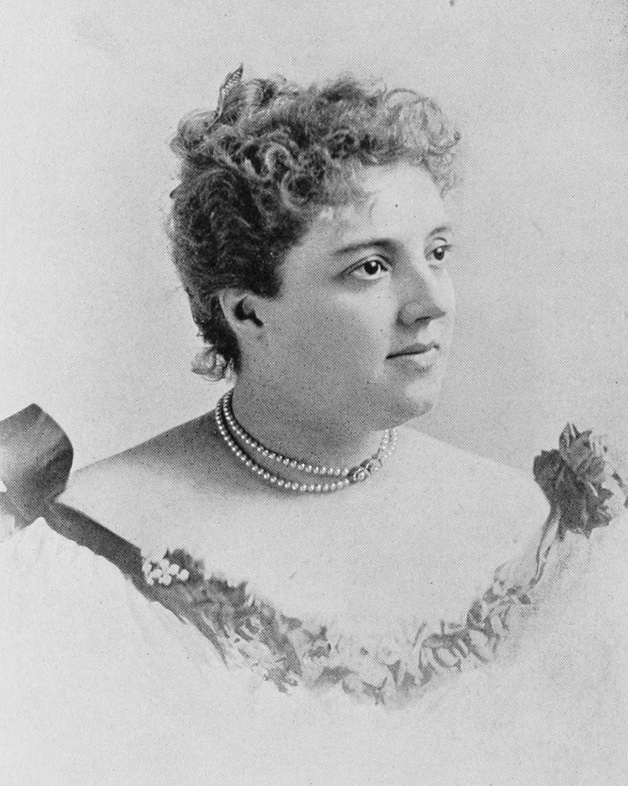
- Kate Rolla, from an 1894 publication
- Born: Katherine Doane Wheat; 1859; Wheeling, West Virginia, US
- Died: December 28, 1925 (aged 65–66); Paris, France
- Other names: Katherine Rammelsberg, Caterina Rolla
- Occupations: Opera singer, voice teacher
- Relatives: Larry Wheat (brother)

Kate Rolla (1859 – December 28, 1925), born Katherine Doane Wheat, was an American opera singer.

== Early life and education ==
Katherine Doane Wheat was born in Wheeling, West Virginia, the daughter of George Keiter Wheat and Fannie Josephine Doane Wheat. Her father was a banker and businessman, and her mother was a suffragist and clubwoman. Her younger brother Larry Wheat became an actor.

After an early first marriage faltered, Rolla went to Paris to train as a singer, with Mathilde Marchesi.

== Career ==
Rolla made her operatic stage debut at the Teatro Carcano in Milan, singing the title role in Linda di Chamounix. She sang in various European cities, from Dublin to Moscow. In 1887 she sang at the Teatro Bellini in Naples, and returned to Wheeling to give a concert, fresh from "her foreign triumphs". She sang at London's Covent Garden in 1888, in Don Giovanni, and in 1891, in Carmen and Le prophète. She sang in one production of the D'Oyly Carte Opera Company, Mirette in 1894. In 1896, she sang with the Boston Symphony Orchestra.

Contemporary descriptions of Rolla's voice record various estimations of her skill. "Her voice is of pure and bell-like quality," commented one American newspaper in 1887, "with a degree of power that is almost equal to that of Materna." But a review in The New York Times was ambivalent in 1892, explaining that she "has a powerful voice of a somewhat metallic timbre, but she sang her numbers with considerable taste and fairly won her applause."

Rolla appeared in two Broadway musical productions, The Return of Eve (1909) and Molly May (1910). By that time, her singing voice had faded: "Kate Rolla as Mrs. Sparks was excellent till she tried to sing," said one 1910 reviewer. Rolla taught voice students in New York City during World War I.

== Personal life ==
Katherine Wheat married Oscar Rammelsberg in 1876 and had a son, George, born in 1879 in Ohio. The Rammelsbergs divorced in 1883. She died late in 1925, in her sixties, from an infection after an appendectomy.
