= Leland Curtis =

American painter

Leland S. Curtis (7 August 1897 – 17 March 1989) was an American artist, mountaineer, skier, environmentalist and Antarctic explorer.

== Life ==
Curtis was born in Denver, Colorado, and lived in Seattle, Washington as a child. He moved to Los Angeles in 1914 and attended the Manual Arts High School, where he studied under artist and screenwriter Rob Wagner. He was the official artist for the United States Antarctic Expeditions of 1939 to 1940, 1955 to 1956 and also 1957. The 1939–1940 expedition was called the United States Antarctic Service Expedition and was led by Rear Admiral Richard Evelyn Byrd. The 1955–1956 expedition was called Operation Deepfreeze I, and was also led by Byrd, who died shortly after the expedition ended. Curtis was sponsored by the National Science Foundation for the 1957 expedition, which was called Operation Deepfreeze III, led by Admiral George J. Dufek. This was the first U.S. expedition to reach the South Pole. These Operation Deepfreeze expeditions were part of the International Geophysical Year.

Curtis was a longtime member of the Sierra Club, and was a founding member of its Ski Mountaineers Section on 26 September 1935. He served on the national Sierra Club board of directors from 1943 to 1946. He illustrated many Sierra Club publications over the years.

Most of his paintings were of Antarctica, the High Sierra, the Grand Tetons where he owned a cabin in Moose, Wyoming, and the deserts of the southwestern United States. He won dozens of gold medals in Southern California art competitions. Curtis was a member of the California Art Club, a center of the California Impressionism style, and displayed his work in its exhibitions in the 1920s. There is an active market for his paintings.

He died in Carson City, Nevada.
