= Pedro, the Angel of Olvera Street =

1946 Picture book

- First edition
- Author: Leo Politi
- Publisher: Scribner's
- Publication date: 1936
- Pages: unpaged
- Awards: Caldecott Honor

Pedro, the Angel of Olvera Street is a 1946 picture book written and illustrated by Leo Politi. The story is about Pedro's participation in a posada. The book was a recipient of a 1947 Caldecott Honor for its illustrations.
