= Dick Turpin (1925 film) =

1925 film

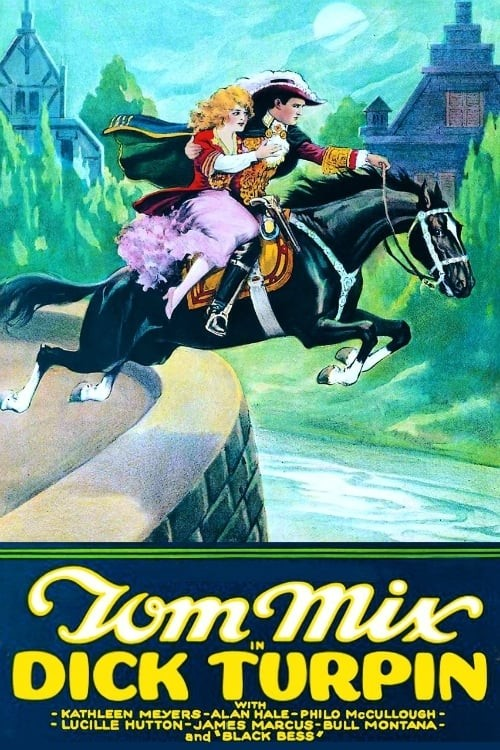
- Theatrical release poster
- Directed by: John G. Blystone
- Screenplay by: Charles Darnton (scenario); Donald W. Lee (scenario)
- Story by: Charles Kenyon
- Produced by: William Fox
- Starring: Tom Mix; Kathleen Myers
- Cinematography: Daniel B. Clark
- Production company: Fox Film Corporation
- Distributed by: Fox Film Corporation
- Release dates: January 24, 1925 (NYC); February 1, 1925 (USA)
- Running time: 70 minutes
- Country: United States
- Language: Silent (English intertitles)

Dick Turpin is a 1925 American silent historical adventure film directed by John G. Blystone produced and distributed by Fox Film Corporation and starring western hero Tom Mix. Mix departs from his usual western roles to play a British historical figure, the highwayman Dick Turpin (1705–1739). A young Carole Lombard was filmed in several scenes which mostly ended up on the cutting room floor.

== Plot ==
The full film

As described in a review in a film magazine, several hundred years ago in England there was a famous highwayman, Dick Turpin, who preyed upon the rich and helped the poor. One day he encountered Lord Churlton and, a little later, in aiding a coach attacked by ruffians, he finds it contains Lady Brookfield. She tells him that she must marry Lord Churlton. Dick discloses his identity and offers to aid her. Arriving at the inn, Dick sees Lady Alice dress in men's clothes and sneak out while he escapes after a daring running fight with the guards. They journey to London. Lord Churlton follows and, when capture seems near, Dick disguises himself as a fighter and goes into the ring. As the guards close in, he again escapes by throwing the prize money to the rabble. In the forest he declares his love for Alice. A poor woman appears who asks for his aid, and he discovers himself surrounded by guards. Taken to prison, he is condemned to death. At the scaffold he finds his friend, Tom King, has taken the place of the hangman. Tom tells him that the crowd is with him and to take a break for his liberty. He escapes on his famous horse, Black Bess, and immediately starts out for York to aid Lady Alice. For days the guards keep up the pursuit, one by one giving out, until the last one succumbs near the journey's end. Dick arrives just in time to save Lady Alice. The two escape to France. Dick gives up his life on the road and the two find happiness.

== Cast ==
- Tom Mix as Dick Turpin
- Kathleen Myers as Alice Brookfield
- Philo McCullough as Lord Churlton
- James Marcus as Squire Crabstone
- Lucille Hutton as Sally, the maid
- Alan Hale as Tom King
- Bull Montana as Bully Boy
- Jack Herrick as Bristol Bully
- Fred Kohler as Taylor
- Tony the Horse as Black Bess (credited as Black Bess)
- Valentine Black as Child (uncredited)
- Gary Cooper as Crowd Extra (uncredited)
- Fay Holderness as Barmaid (uncredited)
- Carmencita Johnson as Baby (uncredited)
- Buck Jones as Crowd Extra (uncredited)
- Sid Jordan as Highway Patrol Leader (uncredited)
- Carole Lombard as Crowd Extra (uncredited)

== Preservation ==
Prints of Dick Turpin are located in the George Eastman Museum Motion Picture Collection, Cinemateket-Svenska filminstitutet (Stockholm), and two different versions in the UCLA Film & Television Archive.

== See also ==
- Tom Mix filmography
