= The Last Trail (1921 film) =

1921 film

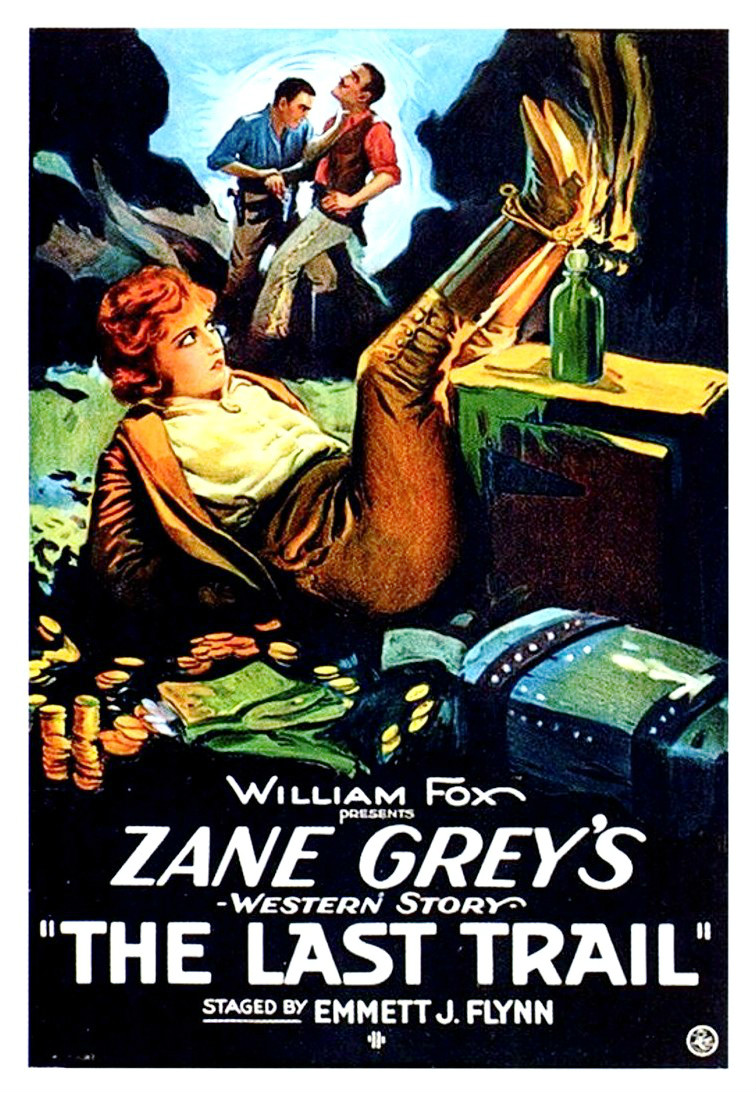
- Directed by: Emmett J. Flynn
- Written by: Jules Furthman; Paul Schofield
- Based on: The Last Trail by Zane Grey
- Produced by: William Fox
- Starring: Maurice 'Lefty' Flynn; Eva Novak; Wallace Beery
- Cinematography: Lucien N. Andriot
- Production company: Fox Film Corporation
- Distributed by: Fox Film Corporation
- Release date: November 1921
- Running time: 70 minutes
- Country: United States
- Languages: Silent; English intertitles

The Last Trail is a 1921 American silent Western film directed by Emmett J. Flynn and starring Maurice 'Lefty' Flynn, Eva Novak and Wallace Beery. It is based on the 1909 novel The Last Trail by Zane Grey.

== Cast ==
- Maurice 'Lefty' Flynn as The Stranger
- Eva Novak as Winifred Samson
- Wallace Beery as William Kirk
- Rosemary Theby as Chiquita
- Charles K. French as Sheriff Nelson
- Harry Spingler as Campbell
- Harry Dunkinson as Kenworth Samson

== Bibliography ==
- Connelly, Robert B. The Silents: Silent Feature Films, 1910-36, Volume 40, Issue 2. December Press, 1998.
- Munden, Kenneth White. The American Film Institute Catalog of Motion Pictures Produced in the United States, Part 1. University of California Press, 1997.
