= Glenister of the Mounted =

1926 film

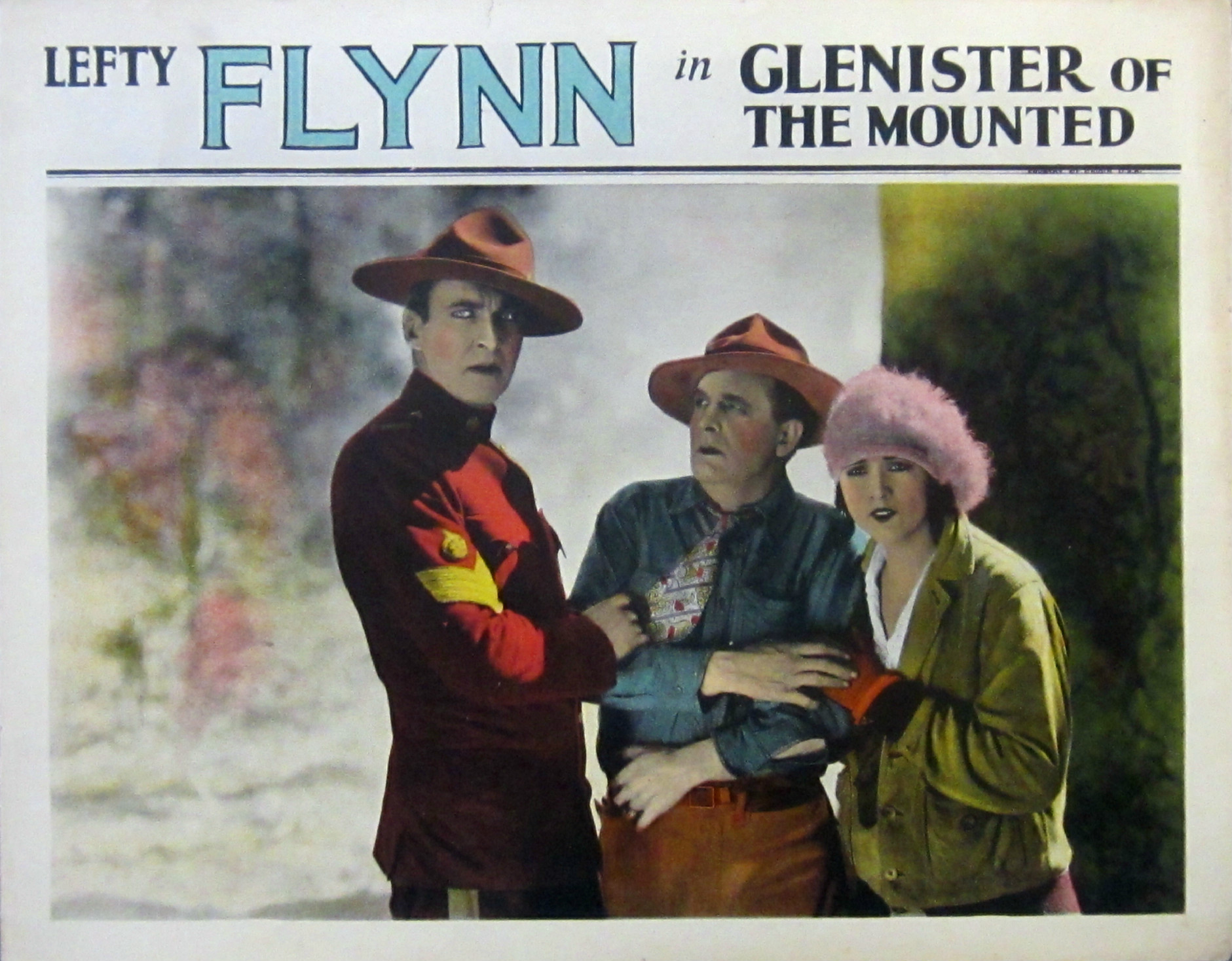
- Lobby card
- Directed by: Harry Garson
- Written by: William E. Wing
- Story by: Arthur Guy Empey
- Produced by: Harry Garson
- Starring: Maurice 'Lefty' Flynn; Bess Flowers; Lee Shumway
- Cinematography: James Diamond
- Production company: Robertson-Cole Pictures Corporation
- Distributed by: Film Booking Offices of America
- Release date: May 23, 1926
- Running time: 60 minutes
- Country: United States
- Language: Silent (English intertitles)

Glenister of the Mounted is a 1926 American silent Western film directed by Harry Garson and starring Maurice 'Lefty' Flynn, Bess Flowers, and Lee Shumway.

== Cast ==
- Maurice 'Lefty' Flynn as Sergeant Richard Glenister
- Bess Flowers as Elizabeth Danrock
- Lee Shumway as Jack Danrock
- Walter James as Thorald
- James Gibson as Rafferty
- Arthur Millett as Sergeant Major Willis
