= Hush Money (1921 film) =

1921 American silent drama film

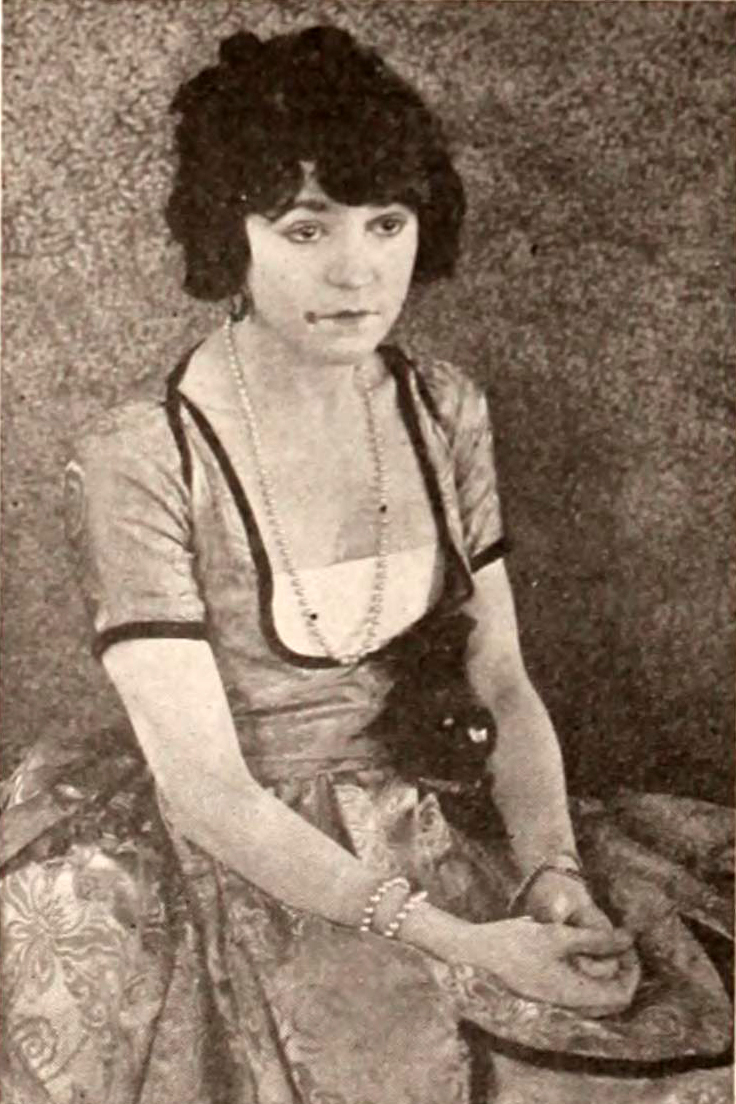
- Alice Brady in a film still
- Directed by: Charles Maigne
- Screenplay by: Charles Maigne; Samuel Merwin
- Starring: Alice Brady; George Fawcett; Larry Wheat; Harry Benham; Jerry Devine
- Cinematography: Gilbert Warrenton
- Production company: Realart Pictures Corporation
- Distributed by: Paramount Pictures
- Release date: November 1921
- Running time: 50 minutes
- Country: United States
- Language: Silent (English intertitles)

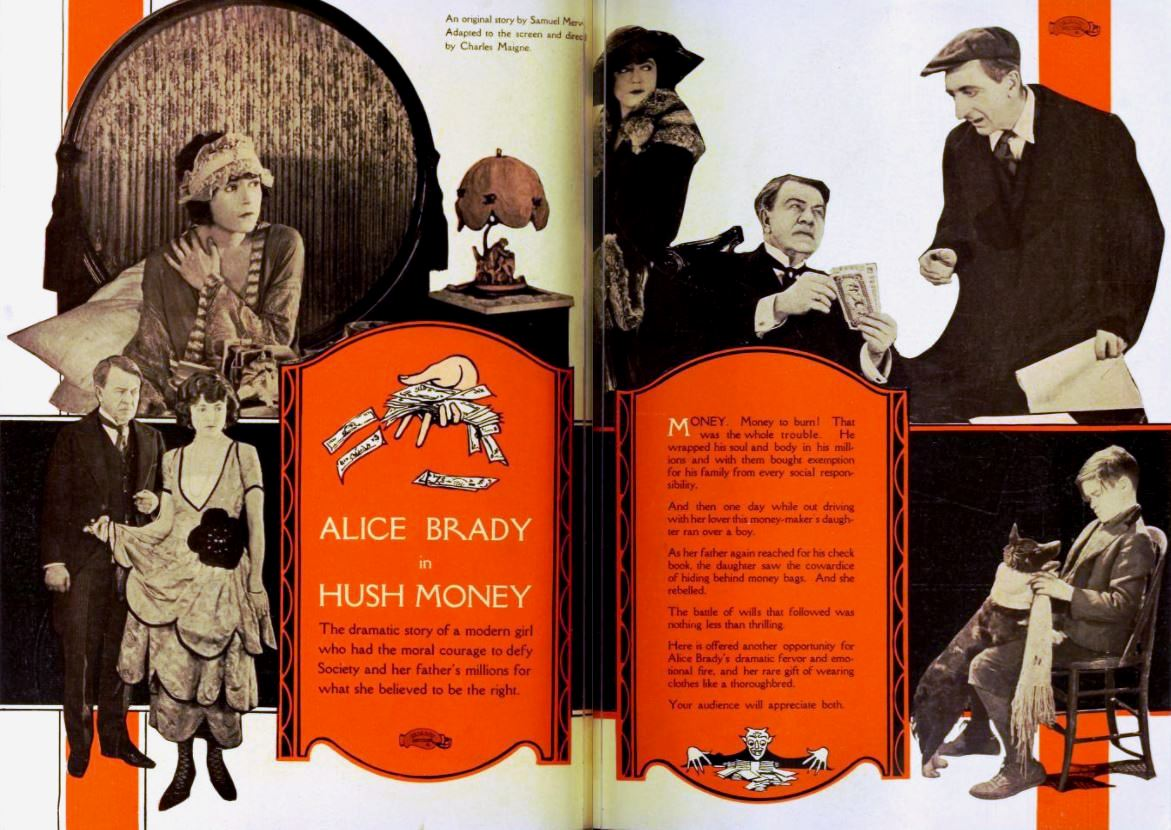
Hush Money advertisement.

Hush Money is a lost 1921 American silent drama film directed by Charles Maigne and written by Charles Maigne and Samuel Merwin. The film stars Alice Brady, George Fawcett, Larry Wheat, Harry Benham, and Jerry Devine. The film was released in November 1921, by Paramount Pictures.

== Plot ==
As described in a film magazine, Evelyn Murray, daughter of powerful New York financier Alexander Murray, runs down a poor boy with her car, and her fiancé persuades her to flee before determining the extent of his injuries. Her father pays hush money to the only witness of the accident to thwart her determination to admit her connection. Conscience stricken, Evelyn breaks her engagement, leaves home, and takes up charity work under the supervision of the young Bishop Deems. Eventually she is victorious in the ensuing conflict of wills and brings about her father's reformation and the renewal of her engagement.

== Cast ==
- Alice Brady as Evelyn Murray
- George Fawcett as Alexander Murray
- Larry Wheat as Bert Van Vliet
- Harry Benham as Bishop Deems
- Jerry Devine as Terry McGuire
