= Mulhall's Greatest Catch =

1926 film

- Directed by: Harry Garson
- Written by: Gerald Beaumont; Jefferson Moffitt; Rex Taylor
- Produced by: Harry Garson
- Starring: Maurice 'Lefty' Flynn; Kathleen Myers; Henry Victor
- Cinematography: Harry Joe Brown
- Production company: Harry Garson Productions
- Distributed by: Film Booking Offices of America
- Release date: July 4, 1926
- Running time: 50 minutes
- Country: United States
- Languages: Silent; English intertitles

Mulhall's Greatest Catch is a 1926 American silent drama film directed by Harry Garson and starring Maurice 'Lefty' Flynn, Kathleen Myers and Henry Victor. It is also known by the alternative title of When Heroes Love.

== Cast ==
- Maurice 'Lefty' Flynn as Joe Mulhall
- Kathleen Myers as Nora McCarren
- Henry Victor as Otto Nelson
- Harry Dunkinson as Con McCarren
- Harry Arras as Capt. Collins

== Bibliography ==
- Phillips, Alastair & Vincendeau, Ginette. Journeys of Desire: European Actors in Hollywood. British Film Institute, 2006.
