= The Patent Leather Kid =

1927 film

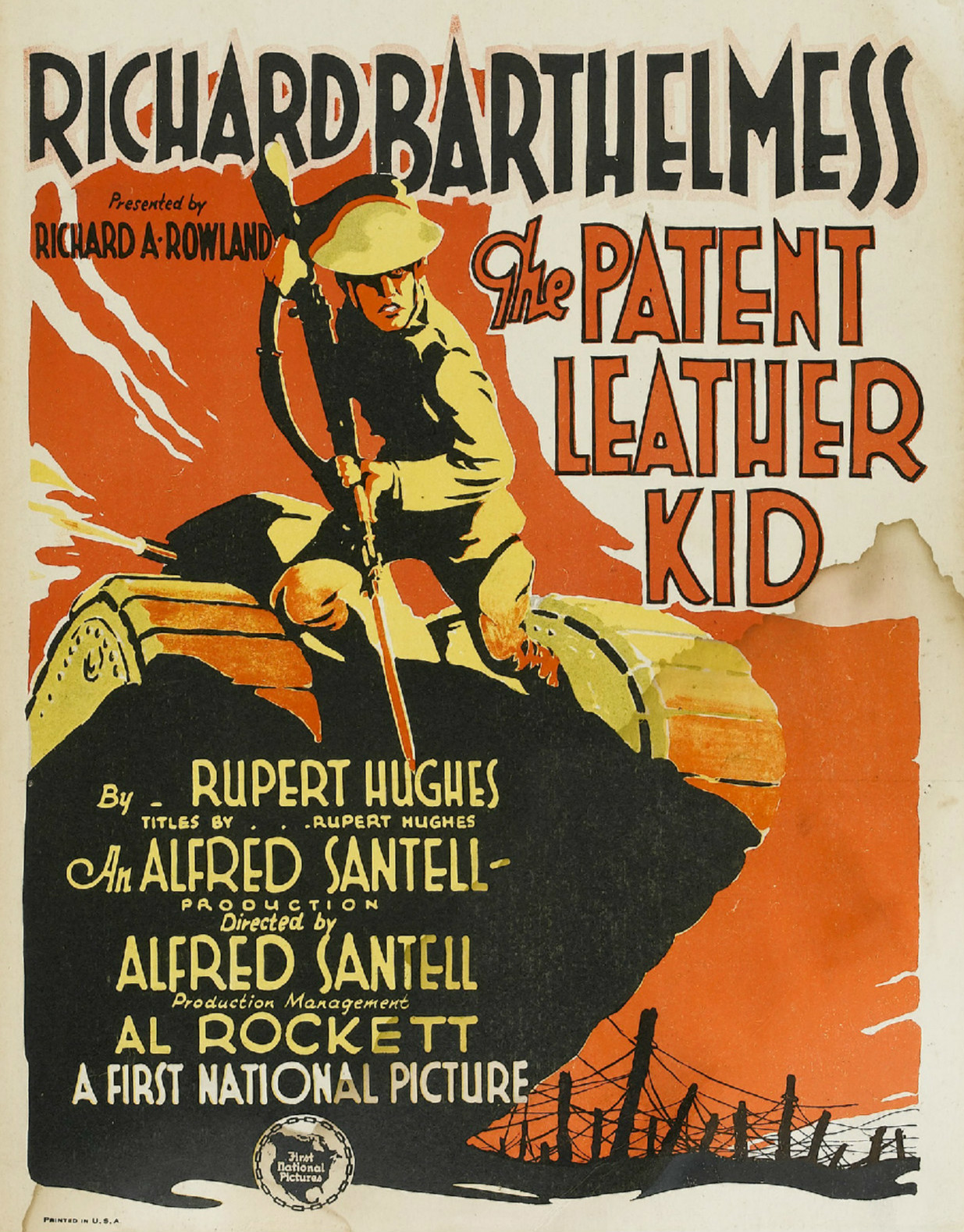
- Film poster
- Directed by: Alfred Santell
- Written by: Rupert Hughes (story); Winifred Dunn (scenario)
- Produced by: Alfred Santell; Richard A. Rowland
- Starring: Richard Barthelmess
- Cinematography: Arthur Edeson; Ralph Hammeras; Alvin Knechtel
- Music by: Cecil Copping (at opening)
- Distributed by: First National Pictures
- Release dates: August 15, 1927 (premiere); September 1, 1927 (US)
- Running time: ?130–154 minutes(per IMDb) / 12 reels
- Country: United States
- Language: Silent (English intertitles)
- Budget: $850,000
- Box office: $1.2 million

The Patent Leather Kid is a 1927 American silent drama film about a self-centered boxer who performs a heroic act in World War I that severely wounds him. It was directed by Alfred Santell and stars Richard Barthelmess, Molly O'Day, Lawford Davidson, Matthew Betz and Arthur Stone.

The film was adapted by Gerald C. Duffy (titles), Winifred Dunn, Casey Robinson (uncredited) and Adela Rogers St. Johns from the story by Rupert Hughes.

Barthelmess was nominated for the Academy Award for Best Actor.

A copy of the film is held by the Library of Congress and a 16mm print exists at the Wisconsin Center for Film and Theater Research.

== Cast ==
- Richard Barthelmess as the Patent Leather Kid
- Molly O'Day as Curley Boyle
- Lawford Davidson as Lt. Hugo Breen
- Matthew Betz as Jake Stuke
- Arthur Stone as Jimmy Kinch
- Ray Turner as Mabile Molasses
- Hank Mann as Sergeant
- Walter James as Officer Riley
- Lucien Prival as the German Officer
- Nigel De Brulier as the French Doctor
- Fred O'Beck as Tank Crew
- Clifford Salam as Tank Crew
- Henry Murdock as Tank Crew
- Charles Sullivan as Tank Crew
- John Kolb as Tank Crew
- Al Alleborn as Tank Crew
- Billy Bletcher as Fight Fan (uncredited)
- Fred Kelsey as Fight Fan (uncredited)
- Lafe McKee as Fight Spectator (uncredited)
