= Kathleen Myers =

American actress (1899–1959)

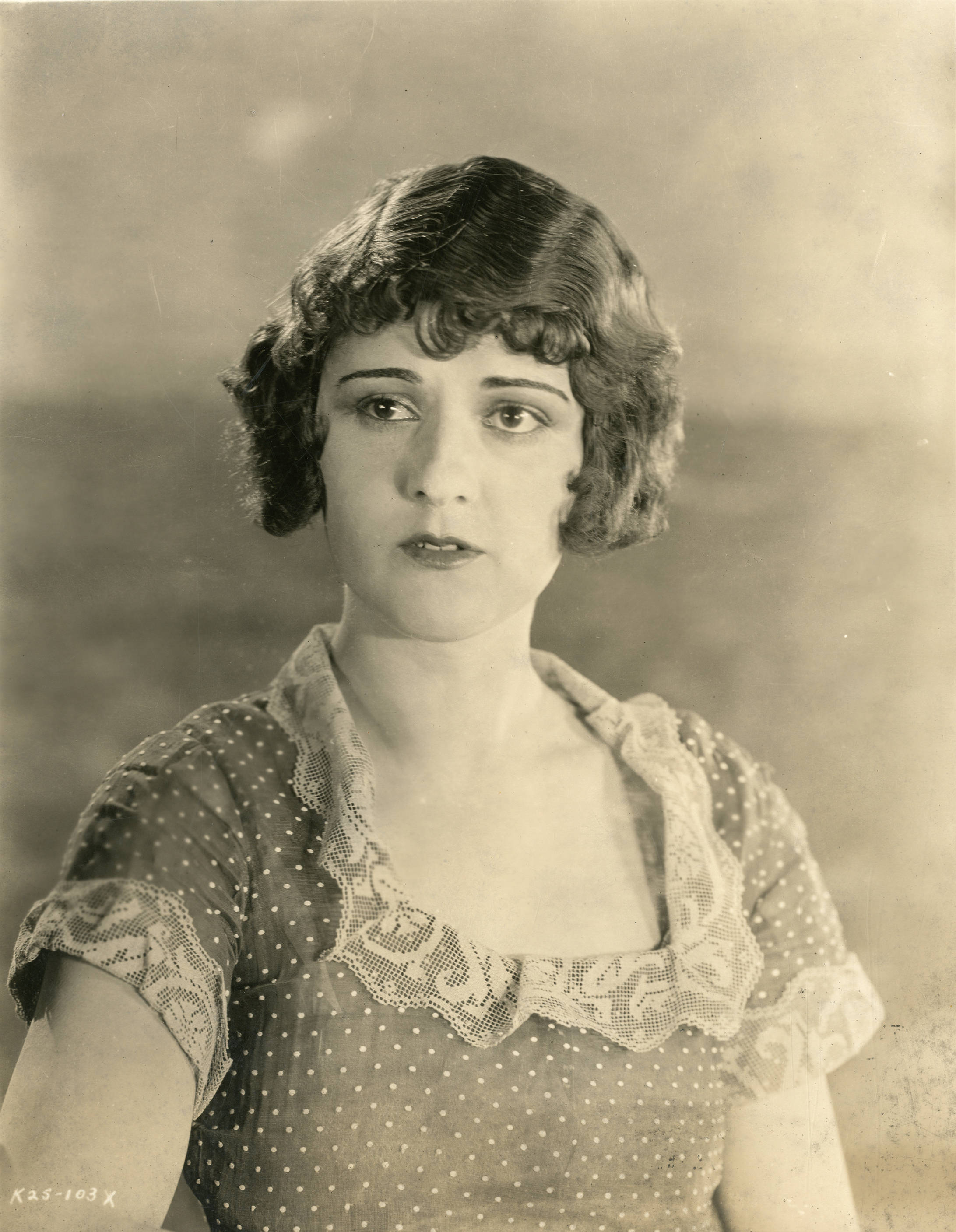
- Myers in 1925
- Born: April 16, 1899; Covington, Kentucky, U.S.
- Died: September 27, 1959 (aged 60); Cincinnati, Ohio, U.S.
- Occupation: Actress
- Years active: 1920–1928 (film)

Kathleen Myers (April 16, 1899 – September 27, 1959) was an American film actress of the silent era.

== Biography ==
Myers was the daughter of S. C. Myers, manager of Chrome Steel Works in Newark, New Jersey.

Appearing in 22 feature films between 1921 and 1928, "graduating from straight comedies to comedy drama and feature plays." She also had lead roles in some films made in South America.

Myers was a leading lady in a number of action or adventure productions, including Dick Turpin (1925), in which she starred alongside Tom Mix. During the early 1920s she also appeared in a number of comedy shorts, often featuring Oliver Hardy.

== Partial filmography ==
- Reputation (1921) – Ingenue (stage sequence)
- The Secret Four (1921)
- Captain Kidd (1922, Serial) – Louise Bradley
- Flaming Hearts (1922)
- Der Fluch der Habgier (1922)
- The Barnyard (1923, Short) – The Farmer's Daughter
- The Gown Shop (1923, Short) – Head saleslady
- Stolen Secrets (1924) – Cordelia Norton
- Babbitt (1924) – Miss McGoun
- Midnight Secrets (1924)
- Cheap Kisses (1924) – Mignon De Lisle
- Dick Turpin (1925) – Lady Alice Brookfield
- His Supreme Moment (1925) – Sara Deeping
- Heads Up (1925) – Angela
- Goat Getter (1925) – Virginia Avery
- Go West (1925) – His Daughter
- Smilin' at Trouble (1925) – Kathleen O'Toole
- The Traffic Cop (1926) – Alicia Davidson
- Sir Lumberjack (1926) – Bess Calhoun
- The Lucky Fool (1926) – Elma Saunders
- The Gentle Cyclone (1926) – Mary Wilkes
- Mulhall's Greatest Catch (1926) – Nora McCarren
- Kosher Kitty Kelly (1926) – Rosie Feinbaum
- The Flying Mail (1926) – Alice Hardwick
- Fourth Commandment (1927) – Mrs. Smith
- She's My Baby (1927) – Bernice Wilbur
- Ladies Beware (1927) – Georgette
- A Gentleman Preferred (1928) – Maryann Carter (final film role)

== Bibliography ==
- Solomon, Aubrey. The Fox Film Corporation, 1915-1935: A History and Filmography. McFarland, 2011.
