= Juanita (children's book) =

1948 Caldecott picture book

- First edition
- Author: Leo Politi
- Publisher: Charles Scribner's Sons
- Publication date: 1948
- Pages: unpaged
- Awards: Caldecott Honor

Juanita is a 1948 picture book written and illustrated by Leo Politi. The book explores the Mexican-American community in the Olvera Street neighborhood of Los Angeles. It was a recipient of a 1949 Caldecott Honor for its illustrations.
