= Stolen Secrets =

1924 film by Irving Cummings

- Directed by: Irving Cummings
- Screenplay by: Rex Taylor
- Story by: Richard Goodall
- Starring: Herbert Rawlinson; Kathleen Myers; Edwards Davis; Henry Herbert; Arthur Stuart Hull; William Conklin
- Cinematography: Charles J. Stumar
- Production company: Universal Pictures
- Distributed by: Universal Pictures
- Release date: March 10, 1924
- Running time: 50 minutes
- Country: United States
- Language: Silent (English intertitles)

Stolen Secrets is a 1924 American silent mystery film directed by Irving Cummings and written by Rex Taylor. The film stars Herbert Rawlinson, Kathleen Myers, Edwards Davis, Henry Herbert, Arthur Stuart Hull, and William Conklin. The film was released on March 10, 1924, by Universal Pictures.

== Plot ==
As described in a film magazine, the exploits of the gentleman crook known as the Eel (Rawlingson) were puzzling the police and matters came to a showdown before the mayor (Davis) when the chief of police (Girard) declared that the underworld was protected by a powerful political ring. He turned in his star and the mayor called in the city attorney to discuss the proposition. That night the Eel pulled two more sensational jobs, both of them within the political group declared by the former police chief to be shielding criminals. This proved the Eel to be a free lance and outside the clique. This political clique was cutting close to the mayor's pockets and the mayor knew it. So the Eel became the object of nets thrown out by the mayor's forces and the opposition political ring as well. The mayor's daughter Cordelia (Myers), blonde, pretty, intelligent and adventuresome, took the matter of helping her father into her own hands and an interview was arranged with the Eel through the personal columns of the morning paper. That night found the Eel and the mayor's daughter in the home of the head of the political group which sought the Eel. The Eel desired certain papers, he told the girl, which should present a clear expose of the mayor's opposition and the graft involved. But the Eel, clever as he appeared to be, seemed to have pulled a faux pas. Three men stepped into the room and he and the girl were trapped on a neat count of burglary and in a wonderful position for a blackmail shakedown. But the Eel had only begun to take action to end the graft and win her heart.

== Cast ==
- Herbert Rawlinson as The Eel / Miles Manning
- Kathleen Myers as Cordelia Norton
- Edwards Davis as John Norton
- Henry Herbert as Brooks Waters
- Arthur Stuart Hull as Sterling Mann
- William Conklin as Chapman Hoggins
- George Siegmann as Nat Fox
- Joseph North as Cruthers
- Alfred Allen as Judge Wright
- William A. Carroll as Arthur Welch
- Ed Brady as Smith
- Joseph W. Girard as Police Chief
- R.M. Batten as Jimmy
- George Magrill as Tom

== Preservation ==
With no prints of Stolen Secrets located in any film archives, it is a lost film.
