= Midnight Secrets =

1924 film directed by Jack Nelson

- Directed by: Jack Nelson
- Written by: Robert J. Horner
- Produced by: Robert J. Horner; W. Ray Johnston
- Starring: George Larkin; Kathleen Myers; Pauline Curley
- Cinematography: Jack Wilson
- Production company: Robert J. Horner Productions
- Distributed by: Rayart Pictures
- Release date: October 1, 1924
- Running time: 5 reels
- Country: United States
- Language: Silent (English intertitles)

Midnight Secrets is a 1924 American silent action film directed by Jack Nelson and starring George Larkin, Kathleen Myers, and Pauline Curley. It was part of a series of six films featuring New York City newspaper reporter character Tip O'Neill, who exposes political corruption.

== Plot ==
As described in a film magazine, Tip O’Neil is the livest wire on the Herald's staff. He has gathered evidence against Logan, the head of the Titanic Construction Co., and Dan Macey, a politician. Dan calls on Inspector Murphy of the Police Department, and warns him to “lay off.” While in the Inspector’s office Dan sees Ruth, the girl that Tip loves, at the safe where the evidence is placed. Dan goes to Rita who owns a Beauty Shoppe and is his “sweetie” and they plot to use a girl, Sophie, who closely resembles Ruth to get the evidence. Dan takes the evidence from Rita but she swears to get even. Inspector Murphy suspects Ruth of the loss of evidence. Tip believes otherwise. He becomes acquainted with Rita and learns where the evidence is kept. While in Dan’s house he battles Dan’s gang and hears that Ruth is held captive on a boat, so he escapes the gang and rescues Ruth. The Inspector goes to Dan’s house but Dan has burned the envelope containing the evidence. Tip rushes in and takes the real evidence from under the carpet beside safe. Dan and his aids are arrested.

== Cast ==
- George Larkin as Tip O'Neill
- Ollie Kirby as Rita Bonn
- Kathleen Myers as Ruth Anson
- Pauline Curley
- Jack Richardson

== Bibliography ==
- Langman, Larry. American Film Cycles: The Silent Era. Greenwood Publishing, 1998.
