= A Gentleman Preferred =

1928 film

- Directed by: Arthur Hotaling
- Written by: L. V. Jefferson; Al Martin
- Starring: Gaston Glass; Jimmy Aubrey; Kathleen Myers
- Cinematography: Hap Depew
- Production company: Mayfair Productions
- Distributed by: Trinity Pictures
- Release date: June 2, 1928
- Country: United States
- Languages: Silent; English intertitles

A Gentleman Preferred is a 1928 American silent comedy Western film directed by Arthur Hotaling and starring Gaston Glass, Jimmy Aubrey and Kathleen Myers.

== Cast ==
- Gaston Glass as James Fargo
- Jimmy Aubrey as Bill Jenkins
- Kathleen Myers as Maryann Carter
- Jerome La Grasse as Lord Stanweight
- Winifred Landis as Mrs. Clark Carter
- Jack Hopkins as Kent Carlington
- Wilson Benge as Dobbs
- Louise Cabo as Martha
