= The Land of Hope (1921 film) =

1921 film

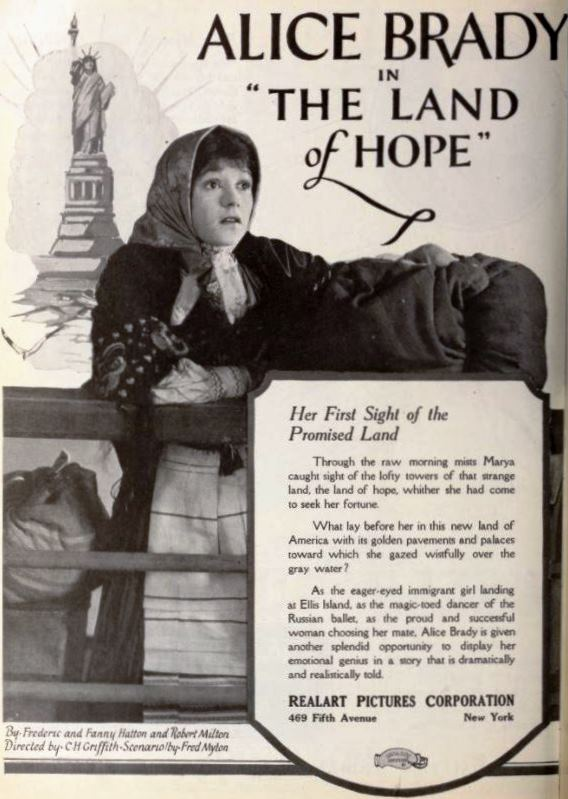
- Advertisement
- Directed by: Edward H. Griffith
- Screenplay by: Fred Myton
- Story by: Fanny Hatton; Frederic Hatton; Robert Milton
- Starring: Alice Brady; Jason Robards Sr. Ben Hendricks Jr. Schuyler Ladd; Larry Wheat; Martha McGraw
- Cinematography: Gilbert Warrenton
- Production company: Realart Pictures Corporation
- Distributed by: Realart Pictures Corporation
- Release date: July 1921
- Running time: 50 minutes
- Country: United States
- Language: Silent (English intertitles)

The Land of Hope is a lost 1921 American drama film directed by Edward H. Griffith and written by Fred Myton. The film stars Alice Brady, Jason Robards Sr., Ben Hendricks Jr., Schuyler Ladd, Larry Wheat, and Martha McGraw. The film was released in July 1921, by Realart Pictures Corporation.

== Cast ==
- Alice Brady as Marya Nisko
- Jason Robards Sr. as Sascha Rabinoff
- Ben Hendricks Jr. as Jan
- Schuyler Ladd as Serge Kosmanski
- Larry Wheat as Stephen Ross
- Martha McGraw as Sophia
- Betty Carsdale as Mildred St. John
- Fuller Mellish as Josef Marinoff
- Bernard Siegel
