= Leo Politi =

American painter

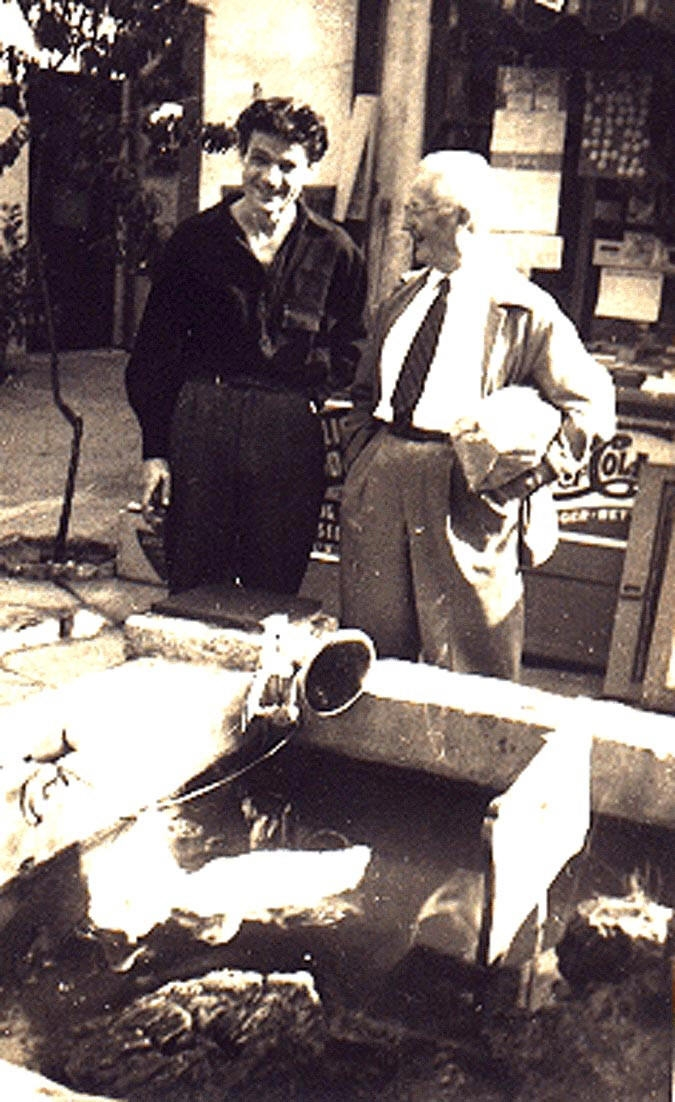
- Leo Politi (left) and Rob Wagner, 1938
- Born: Atiglio Leoni Politi; November 21, 1908; Fresno, California, US
- Died: March 26, 1996 (aged 87); Los Angeles, California
- Education: National Art Institute (Monza, Italy)
- Occupations: Artist, author
- Spouse: Helen Fontes
- Children: Paul Leo Politi; Suzanne Bischof
- Writing career
- Genres: Children's picture books; drawings, paintings
- Subjects: Central America, Mexican-America
- Notable awards: Caldecott Medal; 1950
- Movements: Multiculturalism, pacifism

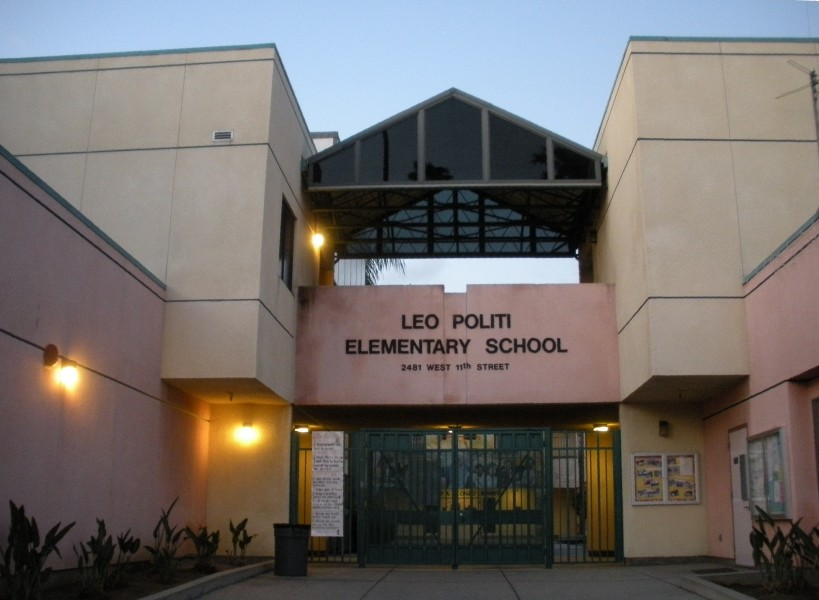
Leo Politi Elementary School, Koreatown, Los Angeles

Leo Politi (November 21, 1908 – March 26, 1996) was an American artist and author who wrote and illustrated some 20 children's books, largely focused on the Mexican-American community in Los Angeles, along with Bunker Hill, Los Angeles, a book intended for adults. His works often celebrated cultural diversity, and many were published in both English and Spanish.

== Childhood ==
Atiglio Leoni (Leo) Politi was born November 21, 1908 in Fresno, California to Italian-American parents Mary Cazzola and Lodovico Politi. Leo's sister, Marie Therese, was two years older.

The family moved to Italy when Politi was seven years old. He made the journey in an "Indian Chief suit," via transcontinental railroad and ocean liner. He grew up, constantly drawing, in his mother's native village of Broni near Milan.

Lodovico Politi left the family to take a job as a cobbler in Piacenza, and Marie went to live with a poor aunt who operated a roadside inn. Leo was placed in a boarding home with an elderly woman and her daughter. Politi loved Broni, a deep affection that remained for the rest of his life. In Broni, he began to develop his artistic sense, drawing sketches of village life.

By 1920, the Politis reunited and moved to London where Politi was exposed to the culture and cosmopolitan lifestyle that Broni could never offer. On weekends, Leo and Marie packed a lunch basket and along with hundreds of other poor children lined up at a London theater to watch live shows and Charlie Chaplin films. Politi devoured everything that London had to offer a boy. He wandered through the city's museums to view the works of Vincent van Gogh and other masters.

After one year, the Politi family returned to Broni where Leo began studying art on a six-year scholarship at the Superior Institute of Fine Arts—also known as the National Art Institute—at the Royal Palace at Monza near Milan.

== Early career ==
In 1931, Politi, at the age of 22, left Italy for California. Passing through the Panama Canal he discovered the exotic beauty of Central America. He sketched the things that he saw and small stories began to bubble up within him. He was attracted to the Mayan culture of the region and developed a palette that served as his core of colors throughout the 1930s and '40s.

Politi later wrote of his technique: "(I) developed an ochre yellow, burnt sienna and a number of brown tints symbolic of the warmth and earthy qualities of the life and vegetation of the tropical Central American jungle. I also used a lively blue-green symbolic of the water, sky and in small spots for precious stones used then in their ornaments as jade – all elements inherent to the Maya civilization."

Artist Buckley Mac-Gurrin, an art critic for the literary film magazine Script published by writer and artist Rob Wagner, wrote in a cover story about Politi in 1940 that "Leo became proficient in the use of many media – oil, watercolor, wood-carving, wood engraving, lithography, book illustration; he had a very fine artistic education. His training was modern as opposed to academic; it tended to develop originality rather than subservient to the art forms of bygone eras. His own artistic philosophy drew him toward the genuine and the earthy; toward people whose contact with the soil was still fresh, intimate, satisfying."

Politi arrived in Los Angeles, California, in October 1931 and two years later he married Helen Fontes.

=== Olvera Street ===
Politi began sketching and painting from a regular spot on Olvera Street in downtown Los Angeles, where he sketched tourists and sold drawings alongside potters, weavers and other artisans-in-residence. Politi's affection for Mexican-Americans and their folkways was genuine; an affinity. Most especially, as a devout Catholic, at home with Italian saints, he responded to Mexican ritual. Children — natural, spontaneous children — he loved without reserve or distinction. Drawing Mexican children, for magazines and books, gave him an American career and a professional identity.

Politi painted a mural on Olvera Street "The Blessing of the Animals", where he depicted a tradition of Catholicism in remembrance of St. Francis of Assisi's love for all creatures. In the mural, men, women and children are walking their animals to get blessed.

During the 1930s, Politi worked in oils, watercolors and wood sculptures. His best work was probably gouache on paper with variations of the theme of mother and child. He also focused on Mexican pueblo scenes, religious ceremonies and customs, dancers and mischievous children. His palette was generally the same: ochre yellow, burnt sienna and brown tints that to him defined the Mayan civilization.

Politi's exhibits included the watercolor "Peons Asleep" and his sculpture "Mother and Child" at the Awards for the Ninth annual Exhibition of Southern California Art in 1937 in San Diego, California. In oil, he exhibited "Two Women and a Child."

During the same year, at the 18th annual Exhibition of Paintings and Sculptures at the Los Angeles Museum in Exposition Park, Politi's wood sculpture "Pedro and Pepa" and watercolor "Market Scene" were exhibited. A year later "Pedro and Pepa" was displayed again at the 10th annual Southern California Art Exhibition at the Fine Arts Gallery in San Diego.

A one-man show at Alma Reed’s Delphic Studios in New York City in 1937 ultimately helped lead Politi into a career as a children's author and illustrator on Latin themes.

== Early books ==
Politi's first book was Little Pancho, the illustrated story of a defiant, if not naughty, little Mexican boy on an adventure. Published in 1938, Little Pancho steered him onto the path as a children’s author. It also attracted the attention of the left-leaning Script magazine, for which Politi became the art editor, as well as a smaller pacifist publication called Freedom, published by Prynce Hopkins.

Politi also illustrated The Least One by Ruth Sawyer in 1941, Aqui se Habla Espanol by Margarita Lopez and Esther Brown in 1942 and Angelo, the Naughty One by Helen Garrett in 1944. In 1944, he illustrated Stories from the Americas. It marked a distinct departure from Politi's early impressionist, cubist and art deco styles to a softer and less dark, gritty execution that typified his later work. The softer tones and themes continued in all of his future books. Multiculturalism continued to be an overriding theme, but was not overtly political as seen in his magazine work.

== Recognition ==
The Catholic Library Association each year presents the Regina Medal of excellence to one living exemplar of the words of the English poet, Walter de la Mare "only the rarest kind of best in anything can be good enough for the young," for continued, distinguished contribution to children's literature without regard to the nature of the contribution. In 1966, Politi was the recipient of the award.

In 1974, a new branch of the Fresno Public Library was named for Leo Politi.

== Selected books ==
- Bunker Hill, Los Angeles: Reminiscences of Bygone Days (1964)

Children's books

- Little Pancho (1938), his first book
- Pedro, the Angel of Olvera Street (1946), a Caldecott runner-up
- The Three Miracles (1946)
- Juanita (1948), a Caldecott runner-up
- A Boat for Peppe (1950)
- Song of the Swallows (1950), Caldecott Medal winner
- Little Leo (1951)
- The Butterflies Come (1957)
- Moy Moy (1960)
- The Noble Doll (1961)
- Rosa (1963)
- Piccolo's Prank (1965)
- Mieko (1969)
- Three Stalks of Corn (1976)
- Mr. Fong's toy shop (1978)
