= Larry Wheat =

American actor (1876–1963)

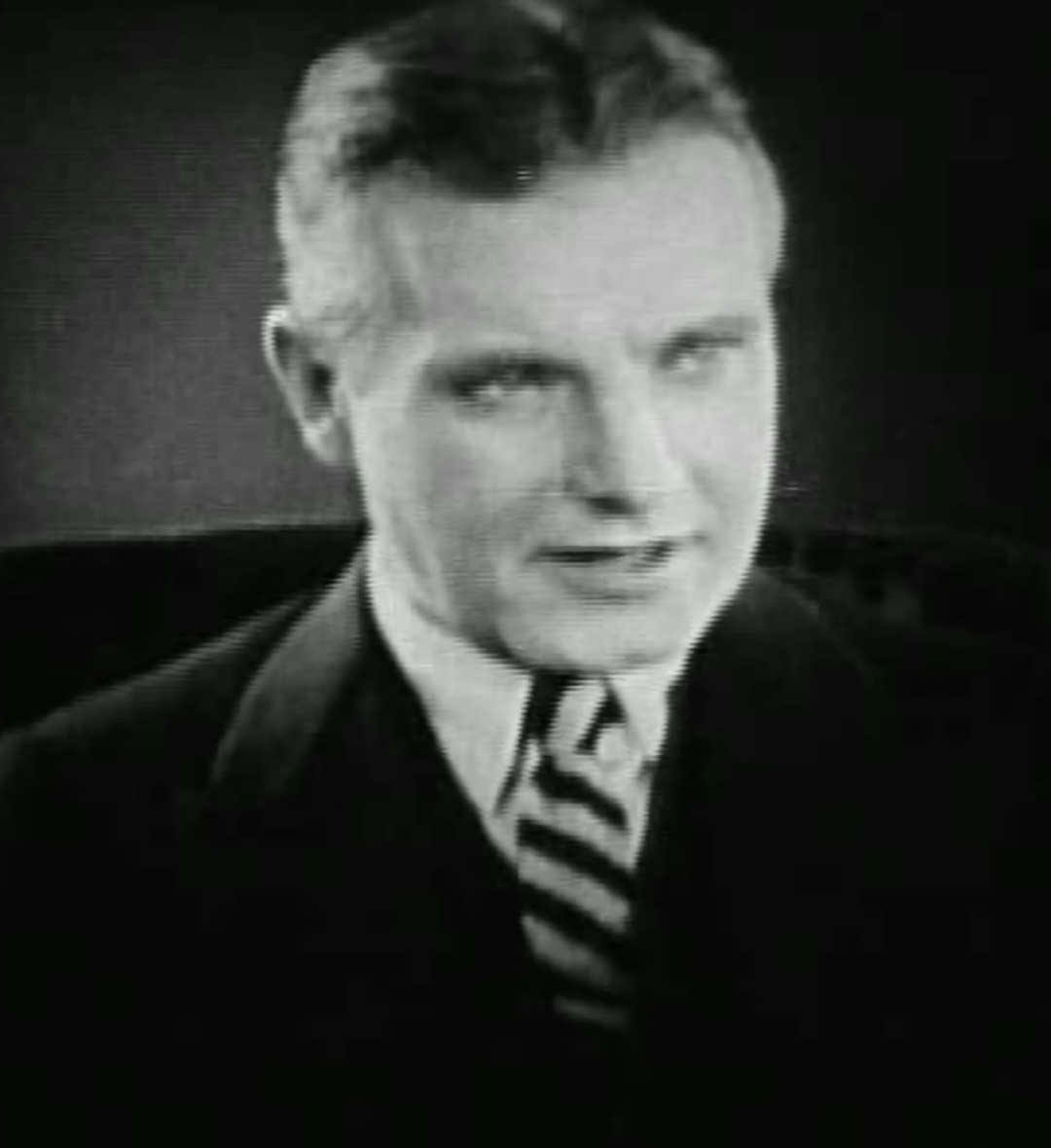
- Wheat in Irene (1926)
- Born: Laurence Wheat; October 10, 1876; Wheeling, West Virginia, U.S.
- Died: August 7, 1963 (aged 86); Los Angeles, California, U.S.
- Resting place: Hollywood Forever Cemetery
- Occupation: Actor
- Years active: 1921–1947
- Relatives: Kate Rolla (sister)

Laurence Wheat (October 10, 1876 – August 7, 1963) was an American character actor of the silent and sound film eras.

== Biography ==
Born on October 20, 1876, in Wheeling, West Virginia, Wheat entered the film industry in 1921 with a supporting role in the film, The Land of Hope, which starred Jason Robards Sr. During his 27-year career he would appear in over 70 films, in small and supporting roles, many of which were unbilled. Some of the more notable films in which Wheat appeared include: Peck's Bad Boy (1934), starring Jackie Cooper; Frank Capra's Mr. Deeds Goes to Town (1936), starring Gary Cooper and Jean Arthur; 1936's The Great Ziegfeld, starring William Powell and Myrna Loy; arguably one of the greatest films ever made, Citizen Kane (1941), directed, starring and co-written by Orson Welles; the classic film noir, Murder, My Sweet (1944), directed by Edward Dmytryk, and starring Dick Powell, Claire Trevor, and Anne Shirley; and 1946's The Spiral Staircase, with Dorothy McGuire, George Brent, and Ethel Barrymore. Wheat's final film role would be in a small unbilled role in the 1947 film, Killer McCoy, starring Mickey Rooney, Brian Donlevy and Ann Blyth. Wheat died on August 7, 1963, in Los Angeles, California, and was buried at Hollywood Forever Cemetery.

Wheat's older sister was opera singer Kate Rolla.

== Filmography ==
(Per AFI database)

- The Land of Hope (1921)
- Hush Money (1921)
- Our Leading Citizen (1922)
- Hollywood (1923)
- The Song of Love (1923)
- The Confidence Man (1924)
- Inez from Hollywood (1924)
- Not So Long Ago (1925)
- Irene (1926)
- The Loudspeaker (1934)
- Student Tour (1934)
- Peck's Bad Boy (1934)
- Ever Since Eve (1934)
- The Big Broadcast of 1936 (1935)
- The Case of the Curious Bride (1935)
- It's in the Air (1935)
- Show Them No Mercy! (1935)
- Public Hero No. 1 (1935)
- Diamond Jim (1935)
- Night Life of the Gods (1935)
- Annapolis Farewell (1935)
- The Preview Murder Mystery (1936)
- 15 Maiden Lane (1936)
- Mr. Deeds Goes to Town (1936)
- Postal Inspector (1936)
- To Mary - with Love (1936)
- The Great Ziegfeld (1936)
- Big City (1937)
- It's All Yours (1937)
- Time Out for Romance (1937)
- Checkers (1937)
- There's That Woman Again (1938)
- Broadway Serenade (1939)
- Turnabout (1940)
- The Trial of Mary Dugan (1941)
- Citizen Kane (1941) - Man Singing at Inquirer Party (uncredited)
- It Happened in Flatbush(1942)
- The Magnificent Dope (1942)
- My Gal Sal (1942)
- The Postman Didn't Ring (1942)
- Gildersleeve on Broadway (1943)
- Gildersleeve's Bad Day (1943)
- Bombardier (1943)
- The White Cliffs of Dover (1944)
- Heavenly Days (1944)
- Experiment Perilous (1944)
- The Canterville Ghost (1944)
- Murder, My Sweet (1944)
- Nevada (1944)
- A Night of Adventure (1944)
- Step Lively (1944)
- Bride by Mistake (1944)
- The Body Snatcher (1945)
- The Enchanted Cottage (1945)
- George White's Scandals (1945)
- Having Wonderful Crime (1945)
- Man Alive (1945)
- Wanderer of the Wasteland (1945)
- West of the Pecos (1945)
- What a Blonde (1945)
- Abie's Irish Rose (1946)
- Badman's Territory (1946)
- The Bamboo Blonde (1946)
- Bedlam (1946)
- Deadline at Dawn (1946)
- The Falcon's Alibi (1946)
- Genius at Work (1946)
- Lady Luck (1946)
- Riverboat Rhythm (1946)
- The Spiral Staircase (1946)
- The Truth About Murder (1946)
- Killer McCoy (1947)
- Magic Town (1947)
- Merton of the Movies (1947)
