= The Love Mart =

1927 film

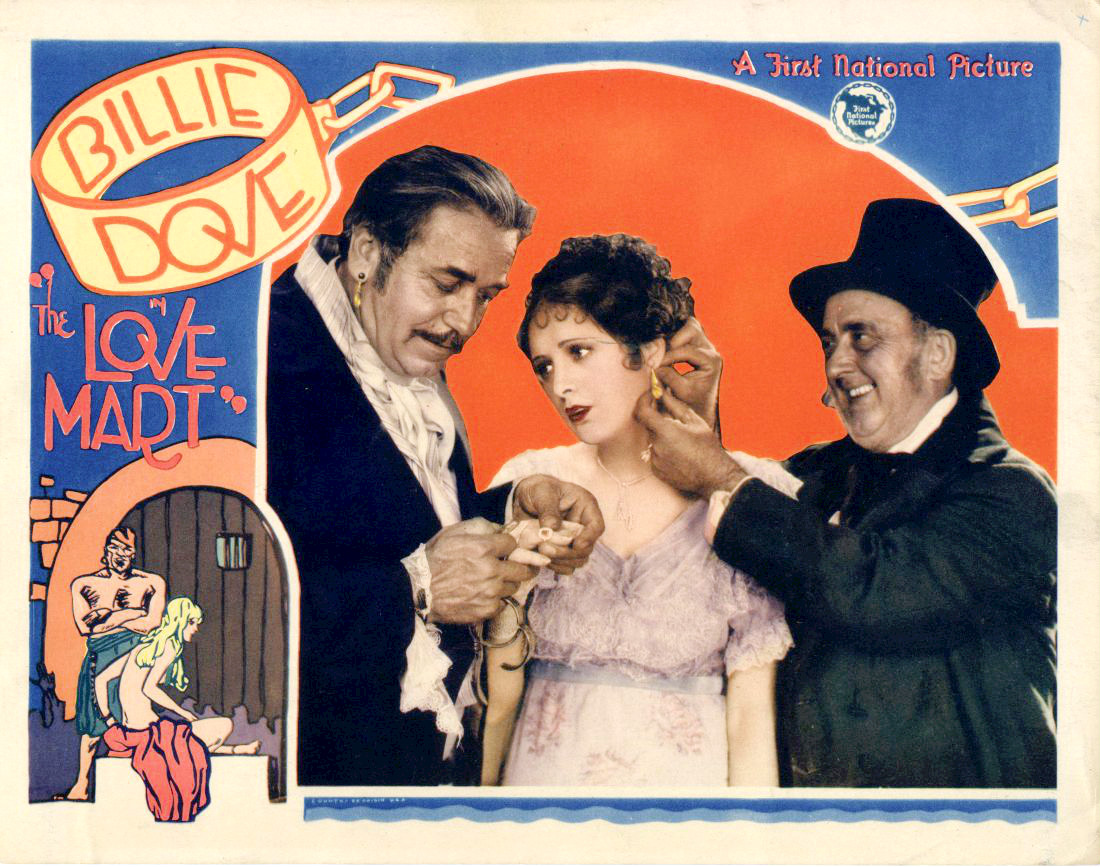
- Lobby card
- Directed by: George Fitzmaurice
- Written by: Edward Childs Carpenter (novel); Benjamin Glazer (screenplay); Edwin Justus Mayer (intertitles)
- Starring: Billie Dove; Gilbert Roland; Noah Beery; Boris Karloff
- Cinematography: Lee Garmes
- Edited by: Stuart Heisler
- Distributed by: First National Pictures
- Release date: December 18, 1927
- Running time: 80 minutes
- Country: United States
- Language: Silent (English intertitles)

The Love Mart is a 1927 American silent drama film directed by George Fitzmaurice starring Billie Dove, Gilbert Roland and Noah Beery, and featuring Boris Karloff. The script was adapted from a novel called "The Code of Victor Jallot" by Edward Childs Carpenter. It was released in some foreign countries as Slavinnan. The film is considered lost.

== Cast ==
- Billie Dove as Antoinette Frobelle
- Gilbert Roland as Victor Jallot
- Ray Turner as Poupet (as Raymond Turner)
- Noah Beery as Captain Remy
- Armand Kaliz as Jean Delicado
- Emile Chautard as Louis Frobelle
- Boris Karloff as Fleming
- Mattie Peters as Caresse

== Production ==
This film had the original title of Louisiana, as surviving publicity materials indicate; it was First National Pictures' production #103.

== Survival status ==
No copies of The Love Mart are currently known to exist. However, the Library of Congress has preserved some footage related to the production featuring Billie Dove. The purpose of the footage appears to have been to test some of Dove's hairstyles for the film. Still frames taken from this 'Hair Test' were posted on internet forums in February 2012.

== See also ==
- Boris Karloff filmography
