= Mabel, Fatty and the Law =

1915 film

- Directed by: Fatty Arbuckle
- Written by: Rob Wagner
- Produced by: Mack Sennett
- Starring: Fatty Arbuckle; Mabel Normand
- Release date: January 18, 1915
- Running time: 11 minutes
- Country: United States
- Language: Silent with English intertitles

Mabel, Fatty and the Law is a 1915 American short comedy film starring Fatty Arbuckle and Mabel Normand, and directed by Fatty Arbuckle. The film is also known as Fatty, Mabel and the Law (American alternative title) and Fatty's Spooning Days. A print of this film survives.

== Cast ==
- Roscoe "Fatty" Arbuckle as Fatty
- Mabel Normand as Fatty's Wife
- Harry Gribbon as Hubby
- Minta Durfee as Hubby's Wife
- Joe Bordeaux
- Glen Cavender
- Josef Swickard
- Alice Davenport
- Al St. John
- Frank Hayes
