= Our Leading Citizen (1922 film) =

1922 film by Alfred E. Green

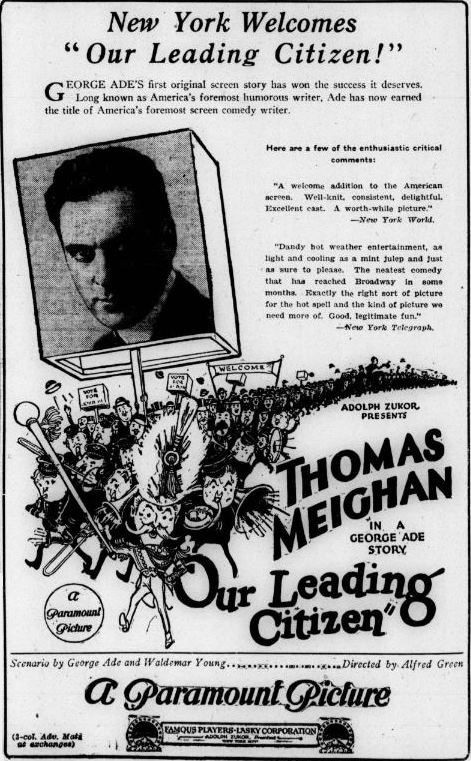
- Advertisement
- Directed by: Alfred E. Green
- Screenplay by: George Ade; Waldemar Young
- Produced by: Adolph Zukor
- Starring: Thomas Meighan; Lois Wilson; William P. Carleton; Theodore Roberts; Guy Oliver; Larry Wheat; James Neill
- Cinematography: William Marshall; L. Guy Wilky
- Production company: Famous Players–Lasky Corporation
- Distributed by: Paramount Pictures
- Release date: June 14, 1922
- Running time: 70 minutes
- Country: United States
- Language: Silent (English intertitles)

Our Leading Citizen is a 1922 American silent comedy film directed by Alfred E. Green and written by George Ade and Waldemar Young. The film stars Thomas Meighan, Lois Wilson, William P. Carleton, Theodore Roberts, Guy Oliver, Larry Wheat, and James Neill. The film was released on June 14, 1922, by Paramount Pictures.

The film is now lost.

== Cast ==
- Thomas Meighan as Daniel Bentley
- Lois Wilson as Katherine Fendle
- William P. Carleton as Oglesby Fendle
- Theodore Roberts as Colonel Sam De Mott
- Guy Oliver as Cale Higginson
- Larry Wheat as J. Sylvester Dubley
- James Neill as Honorable Cyrus Blagdon
- Lucien Littlefield as The Editor
- Charles Stanton Ogle as The Judge
- Tom Kennedy as Boots
- Sylvia Ashton as Mrs. Brazey
- Ethel Wales as Eudora Mawdle
