= Maurice Bennett Flynn =

American football player and actor (1892–1959)

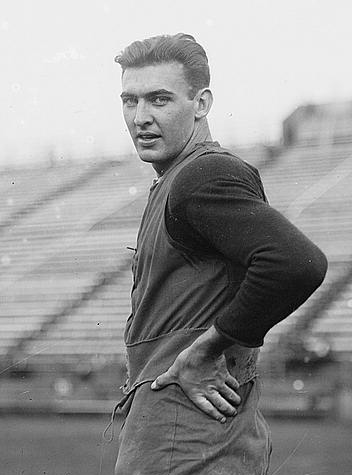
- "Lefty" at Yale c. 1913
- Born: May 26, 1892; Greenwich, Connecticut
- Died: March 4, 1959 (aged 66); Camden, South Carolina
- Occupation: Football player - Actor
- Spouses: Irene Leary (m. 1913; div. 1914): Blanche Palmer; Nora Phipps; Viola Dana (m. 1925; div. 1929)

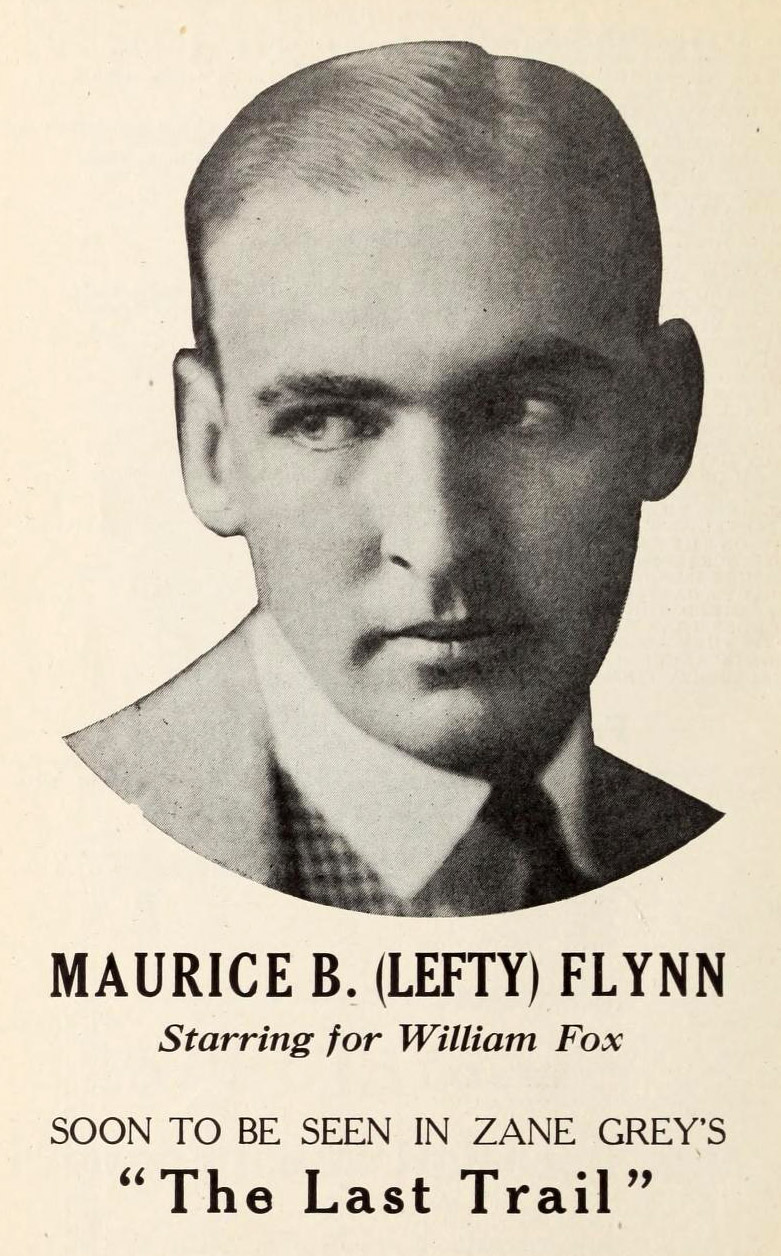
Film promotion featuring Flynn, Wid's Year Book, 1921

Maurice Bennett Flynn (May 26, 1892 – March 4, 1959) was an American football player and actor. He was also known as "Lefty" Flynn because in football, he kicked with his left foot.

== Biography ==
Flynn was born in Greenwich, Connecticut, on May 26, 1892. He later attended Yale University starting in 1910. He was expelled from Yale in January 1913 after he married Irene Leary, a chorus girl. They separated after 11 days, and their divorce became final in 1914. In 1916 he married Blanche Shove Palmer and they had two children, including basketball player and broadcaster Bud Palmer.

Between 1919 and 1927, Flynn appeared in 40 feature films, often as the lead actor, and sometimes as a sports hero or daring adventurer.

He moved to Tryon, North Carolina, and was married for the third time to Nora Langhorne Phipps. She was the youngest sister of Nancy Astor, Viscountess Astor and of Irene Langhorne, who was married to the artist Charles Dana Gibson. Flynn was married to actress Viola Dana from 1925 to 1929.

Nora, Flynn's third wife, persuaded Lefty to cure his alcoholism through Christian Science treatments. She tried less-than-successfully to convince F. Scott Fitzgerald to try the Mary Baker Eddy approach in March 1934, when she and Lefty were caring for Scottie, Zelda and Scott's daughter, during trying times for a depressed Scott. The next month Fitzgerald published a story, "The Intimate Strangers," based on the Flynns.

He died on March 4, 1959, in Camden, SC. He was 66.

== Filmography ==
- Oh, Boy! (1919)
- The Silver Horde (1920)
- The Great Accident (1920)
- Going Some (1920)
- Stop Thief! (1920)
- Officer 666 (1920)
- Just Out of College (1920)
- Roads of Destiny (1921)
- Children of the Night (1921)
- Dangerous Curve Ahead (1921)
- Voices of the City (1921)
- The Old Nest (1921)
- The Last Trail (1921)
- Bucking the Line (1921)
- Oath-Bound (1922)
- The Woman Who Walked Alone (1922)
- Roughshod (1922)
- Smiles Are Trumps (1922)
- Omar the Tentmaker (1922)
- Drums of Fate (1923)
- Hell's Hole (1923)
- The Snow Bride (1923)
- Salomy Jane (1923)
- The No-Gun Man (1924)
- The Millionaire Cowboy (1924)
- The Uninvited Guest (1924)
- Code of the Sea (1924)
- Breed of the Border (1924)
- Open All Night (1924)
- Speed Wild (May 1925)
- High and Handsome (September 1925)
- Heads Up (October 1925)
- Smilin' at Trouble (December 1925)
- The College Boob (1926)
- Sir Lumberjack (1926)
- The Traffic Cop (1926)
- Glenister of the Mounted (1926)
- Mulhall's Greatest Catch (1926)
- The Golden Stallion (1927)
