= Caffie Greene =

American civil rights activist

Caffie Greene (1919–2010), born Katherine Thompson and also known as Caffie Turner, was an American civil rights activist from Los Angeles, California.

Greene was an advocate for organized labor, electing African Americans to political office, and bringing a public hospital to south Los Angeles; she also worked for improvements to public transportation, police accountability, and education. She mentored leaders of the Black Panther Party, and worked with mainstream politicians,; she was a field deputy for LA County Supervisor Kenneth Hahn.

== Biography ==
Katherine Thompson, later Caffie Greene, was born in Little Rock, Arkansas, but spent most of her life in Los Angeles. Between 1939 and about 1950, she was married to actor Raymond Douglas Turner, with whom she managed a desegregated hair salon. Greene was married twice and had 3 children.
