= Heads Up (1925 film) =

American silent comedy adventure film

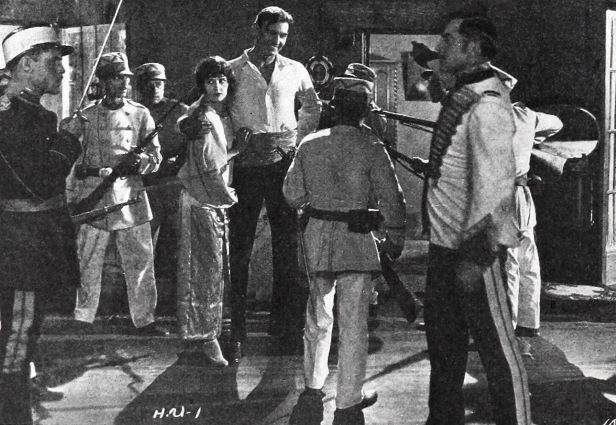
- Film still
- Directed by: Harry Garson
- Written by: Barry Barringer; Rob Wagner
- Produced by: Harry Garson
- Starring: Maurice 'Lefty' Flynn; Kathleen Myers; Kalla Pasha
- Production company: Harry Garson Productions
- Distributed by: Film Booking Offices of America
- Release date: October 25, 1925
- Running time: 60 minutes
- Country: United States
- Language: Silent (English intertitles)

Heads Up is a 1925 American silent comedy adventure film directed by Harry Garson and starring Maurice 'Lefty' Flynn, Kathleen Myers, and Kalla Pasha.

== Plot ==
As described in a film magazine review, a young son of wealth who longs for freedom from the conventions of his home is sent to South America on a secret mission with a group of oil men. He becomes entangled in love and a revolution, and, after a series of swift adventures, wins the affections of the young woman and the war.

== Cast ==
- Maurice 'Lefty' Flynn as Breckenridge Gamble
- Kathleen Myers as Angela
- Kalla Pasha as Malofich
- Jean Perry as Cortez
- Milton Ross as Losada
- Harry McCoy as Biff
- Hazel Rogers as Anita
- Ray Ripley as Comandante
- Robert Cauterio as Spy
- Ray Turner as Zeke

== Bibliography ==
- Connelly, Robert B. The Silents: Silent Feature Films, 1910-36, Volume 40, Issue 2. December Press, 1998.
- Munden, Kenneth White. The American Film Institute Catalog of Motion Pictures Produced in the United States, Part 1. University of California Press, 1997.
