= Gilbert Warrenton =

20th century Hollywood cinematographer

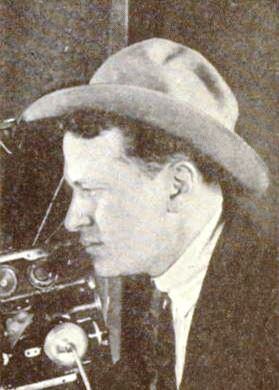
- Warrenton in 1921
- Born: March 7, 1894; Paterson, New Jersey, United States
- Died: August 21, 1980 (aged 86); Riverside County, California, United States
- Other names: G. Warrenton, Gilbert A. Warrenton, Gill Warrenton, Gil Warrenton
- Occupation: Cinematographer

Gilbert Warrenton (March 7, 1894, Paterson, New Jersey - August 21, 1980, Riverside County, California) was a prominent American silent and sound film cinematographer. He filmed over 150 films before his death. Notable credits include The Cat and the Canary (1927) and several B-movies of the 1950s and 1960s.

He was the son of actress Lule Warrenton.

== Selected filmography ==
- Kinkaid, Gambler (1916)
- The Hard Rock Breed (1918)
- Fair Enough (1918)
- The Law of the Great Northwest (1918)
- The Golden Fleece (1918)
- Humoresque (1920)
- The Plaything of Broadway (1921)
- The Land of Hope (1921)
- Hush Money (1921)
- The Lane That Had No Turning (1922)
- Little Old New York (1923)
- Under the Red Robe (1923)
- The Leopardess (1923)
- Flowing Gold (1924)
- Secrets of the Night (1924)
- Love and Glory (1924)
- The Plastic Age (1925)
- The Last Edition (1925)
- Smilin' at Trouble (1925)
- Seven Days (1925)
- The Meddler (1925)
- The Burning Trail (1925)
- The Other Woman's Story (1925)
- California Straight Ahead (1925)
- Butterflies in the Rain (1926)
- The Traffic Cop (1926)
- Tom and His Pals (1926)
- Somebody's Mother (1926)
- Prisoners of the Storm (1926)
- A Man's Past (1927)
- Taxi! Taxi! (1927)
- The Cat and the Canary (1927)
- The Man Who Laughs (1928)
- Jazz Mad (1928)
- Show Boat (1929)
- The Love Trap (1929)
- The Mississippi Gambler (1929)
- Captain of the Guard (1930)
- Ten Cents a Dance (1931)
- If I Had a Million (1932)
- Mama Loves Papa (1933)
- Devil's Mate (1933)
- Ticket to a Crime (1934)
- Champagne for Breakfast (1935)
- Headline Crasher (1936)
- Breezing Home (1937)
- Rose of the Rio Grande (1938)
- Saleslady (1938)
- Under the Big Top (1938)
- The Marines Are Here (1938)
- They Raid By Night (1942)
- Parole, Inc. (1948)
- The Great Dan Patch (1949)
- Roll, Thunder, Roll! (1949)
- Ride, Ryder, Ride! (1949)
- Hot Rod (1950)
- County Fair (1950)
- Aladdin and His Lamp (1952)
- The Great Jesse James Raid (1953)
- High School Hellcats (1958)
- South Pacific (1958)
- The Legend of Tom Dooley (1959)
- The Clown and the Kid (1961)
- Operation Bikini (1963)
