= Sir Lumberjack =

1926 film

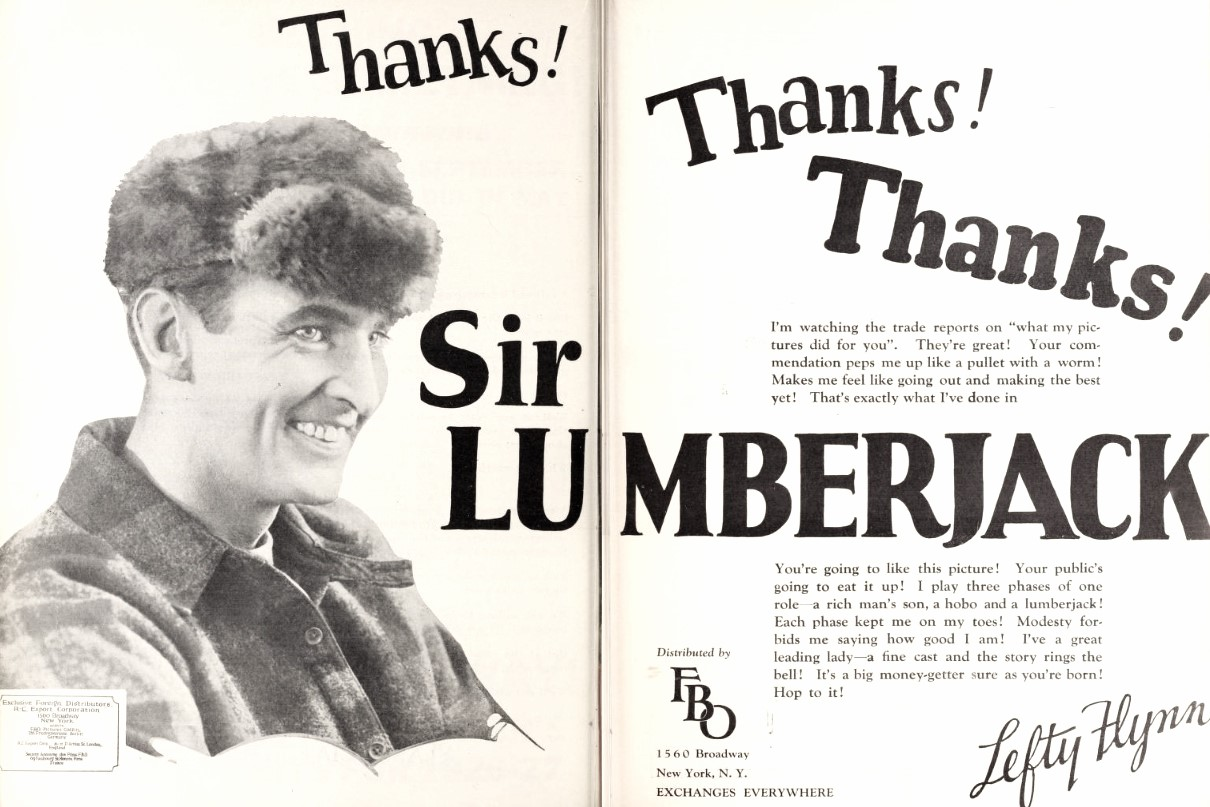
- Advertisement
- Directed by: Harry Garson
- Written by: Victor Gibson
- Starring: Maurice 'Lefty' Flynn; Kathleen Myers; Tom Kennedy
- Cinematography: L. William O'Connell
- Production company: Robertson-Cole Pictures Corporation
- Distributed by: Film Booking Offices of America
- Release date: April 11, 1926
- Running time: 60 minutes
- Country: United States
- Language: Silent (English intertitles)

Sir Lumberjack is a 1926 American silent drama film directed by Harry Garson and starring Maurice 'Lefty' Flynn, Kathleen Myers, and Tom Kennedy.

== Plot ==
As described in a film magazine review, Bill Barlow, a ne’er-do-well decides reform himself by taking work in his father’s lumber camp. Some tramps take his clothes and he is forced to don theirs. He arrives at the camp and is refused recognition as the boss’ son, but is given work helping the cook. He overhears a plot to cut across property belonging to another landholder. He prevents this and obtains the required amount of money to pay off the mortgage for John Calhoun and his daughter Bess, who Bill has decided is to be his future wife, and sells the land to his father.

== Cast ==
- Maurice 'Lefty' Flynn as William Barlow Jr.
- Kathleen Myers as Bess Calhoun
- Tom Kennedy as Bill Blake
- Will Walling as William Barlow Sr.
- Luke Cosgrave as John Calhoun
- Bill Nestell as Lars Hansoon
- Ray Hanford as Jason Mack
- Ray Turner as Cook

== Bibliography ==
- Connelly, Robert B. The Silents: Silent Feature Films, 1910-36, Volume 40, Issue 2. December Press, 1998.
- Munden, Kenneth White. The American Film Institute Catalog of Motion Pictures Produced in the United States, Part 1. University of California Press, 1997.
