= Smilin' at Trouble =

1925 film

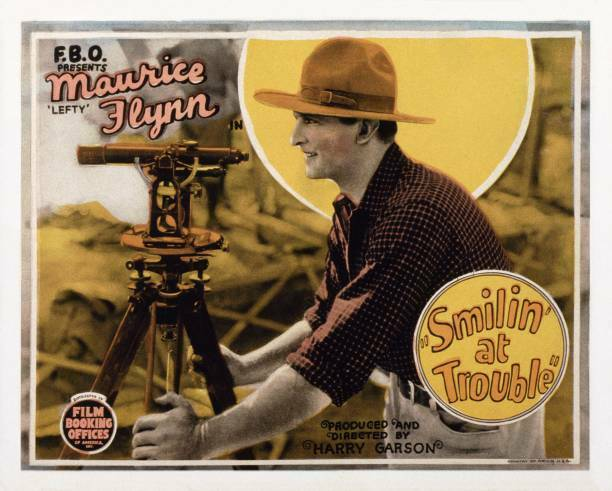
- Lobby card
- Directed by: Harry Garson
- Written by: Barry Barringer; Gertrude Orr; Rob Wagner
- Produced by: Harry Garson
- Starring: Maurice 'Lefty' Flynn; Helen Lynch; Kathleen Myers
- Cinematography: Gilbert Warrenton
- Production company: Harry Garson Productions
- Distributed by: Film Booking Offices of America
- Release date: December 6, 1925
- Running time: 60 minutes
- Country: United States
- Language: Silent (English intertitles)

Smilin' at Trouble is a 1925 American silent Western film directed by Harry Garson and starring Maurice 'Lefty' Flynn, Helen Lynch and Kathleen Myers. Location shooting took place around San Pedro and at a dam construction site, likely the Pit 3 Dam in Northern California.

== Plot ==
As described in a film magazine review, Michael Arnold, a wealthy contractor who hopes to crash into high society with the aid of Lafaette Van Renselaer, a worthless and dishonest aristocratic youth he carried on a dam construction job, engages a young civil engineer Jerry Foster to help him over several structural difficulties in the work. The engineer falls in love with his employer's daughter Alice, and she returns his affection until she believes him to be in love with another woman. The dishonest youth's success in having used inferior cement in the dam results in a flood in which he is drowned. The engineer saves his employer's daughter from death and he and she are wed.

== Cast ==
- Maurice 'Lefty' Flynn as Jerry Foster
- Helen Lynch as Alice Arnold
- Ray Ripley as Lafaette Van Renselaer
- Lee Shumway as Swazey
- Charles McHugh as Clancey O'Toole
- Hal Wilson as Michael Arnold
- Kathleen Myers as Kathleen O'Toole
- Ray Turner as Colored Boy
- Joe O'Brien as Tom

== Bibliography ==
- Connelly, Robert B. The Silents: Silent Feature Films, 1910-36, Volume 40, Issue 2. December Press, 1998.
- Katchmer, George A. Eighty Silent Film Stars: Biographies and Filmographies of the Obscure to the Well Known. McFarland, 1991.
- Munden, Kenneth White. The American Film Institute Catalog of Motion Pictures Produced in the United States, Part 1. University of California Press, 1997.
