= Prynce Hopkins =

American Socialist pacifist activist

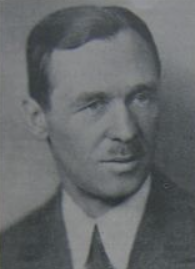
- Born: Prince Charles Hopkins; March 5, 1885; Oakland, California
- Died: August 16, 1970 (aged 85); Santa Barbara, California
- Burial place: Santa Barbara Cemetery
- Other name: Pryns Hopkins
- Occupations: Socialist, writer, philanthropist
- Parents: Charles Harris Hopkins (father); Mary Isabelle (Booth) Hopkins (mother)

Prynce Hopkins (March 5, 1885 - August 16, 1970), who was born Prince Charles Hopkins, was an American Socialist, pacifist, philanthropist, and author of numerous psychology books and periodicals. He was jailed and fined for his strident anti-war views, pro-union activities, and investigated for his associations with such social reformers as Upton Sinclair and Emma Goldman.

== Background ==
Prynce Hopkins, christened Prince Charles Hopkins, was born March 5, 1885, in Oakland, California, to Charles and Mary Hopkins. From about 1921 to 1948 he spelled his name "Pryns," and thereafter Prynce. He was a wealthy Californian described by the several newspapers as a "socialist millionaire." He had inherited a good deal of stock in the Singer Sewing Machine company, which his father, Charles Harris Hopkins, obtained from his second wife, Ruth Merrit Singer, after she died in childbirth. Prynce was the only child of Charles' third wife, Mary Isabelle (Booth) Hopkins. In 1913, Charles Hopkins died and left Prynce and Mary $3 million each. Prynce used his money to fund leftist causes, which he labeled the "uplift movement," and to self-publish books on psychoanalysis, social reform, and religion.

Hopkins obtained his B.A. from Yale University, a Master's degree in education from Columbia University, and a Ph.D. from University College London in psychology. He founded and headed a school on his property near Santa Barbara, California, called "Boyland," which employed the Montessori method of education. Following World War I, Prynce moved to England and France, where he owned and operated another school for boys – Chateau de Burres – which employed a modified version of Montessori education, from 1921 to 1939 (when England entered World War II). During the 1940s, while living in Pasadena, California, and no longer a pacifist, Hopkins published a socialist journal titled Freedom: A Quarterly Commentary On All Aspects of Liberty. He also lectured on comparative religion at Pomona College.

Hopkins was known for his unorthodox approach to social reform. His interests in mixing psychology, social reform, and theology resulted in several books, including Father or Sons? A Study in Social Psychology (1927), The Psychology of Social Movements: a Psycho-Analytic View of Society (1938), and From Gods to Dictators: Psychology of Religions and their Totalitarian Substitutes (1944). Similarly, these interests also resulted in Hopkins publishing and editing - with the collaboration of Sydney Greenbie - a little magazine titled The Germ which subsequently changed its title to Dawn.

In 1898, his parents completed a house in Santa Barbara, California, and moved there from San Francisco. In 1912, Hopkins opened a progressive boys' boarding school called Boyland on his property in the hills above Santa Barbara. The school, however, was short-lived and later the land and buildings of Boyland became a hotel named, "The Samarkand." Currently this land is occupied by a retirement community of the same name as the hotel. When the United States entered World War I in 1917, Hopkins became a vocal anti-war protester. He worked with anarchists Emma Goldman and Alexander Berkman for the anti-war organization League for Amnesty of Political Prisoners. When Goldman was imprisoned for her anti-war activities, Hopkins became chairman of the League. Hopkins was also one of the founders of the American Civil Liberties Union.

== Arrests ==
In 1918, he was indicted by a federal grand jury on charges of violating the Espionage Act of 1917 and arrested. His arrest was based less on spying and more for impeding Army recruiting. The United States Department of Justice raided Boyland and seized anti-war literature and other material as evidence. Materials seized were two published books – More Prussian Than Prussia? A Survey of American Conditions (1917) and The Ethics of Murder: From the Lay View-Point (1918) – which were vehemently anti-war and sympathetic to Germany. On August 31, 1918, Hopkins and his co-defendants Pastor George H. Greenfield, the Reverend Floyd Hardin and Carl Broner pleaded guilty to four counts of violating the Espionage Act. Federal District Court Judge Benjamin F. Bledsoe fined Hopkins $25,000; Greenfield $5,000; Hardin, $5,000; and Broner $500. The defendants promised the court not to publicly discuss the war or distribute anti-war propaganda. The United States Department of Justice continued to investigate Hopkins and read his mail throughout 1918 and most of 1919, but no further action was taken.

Hopkins closed Boyland and founded a similar institution in France. On January 12, 1921, while still in exile in Europe, Hopkins married Eileen Maud Thomas of Wolverhampton, Staffordshire, England, at St. Peter's Church in London (destroyed during WWII) before embarking on a six-month honeymoon around the world.

By 1922, he and Eileen returned to the United States. For a year they lived outside New York City where Hopkins founded Labor Age magazine, which was associated with the Socialist League for Industrial Democracy. He and his wife then moved to Pasadena, California, where he befriended Upton Sinclair and became associated with the Industrial Workers of the World. At the same time he renewed his friendship with fellow Socialist Rob Wagner, later editor and publisher of Script, a literary film magazine. Wagner had sent his two sons to Boyland. Wagner introduced Hopkins to other leftists such as writers William B. DeMille and Max Eastman, as well as illustrator Leo Politi, who contributed to Script and Freedom.

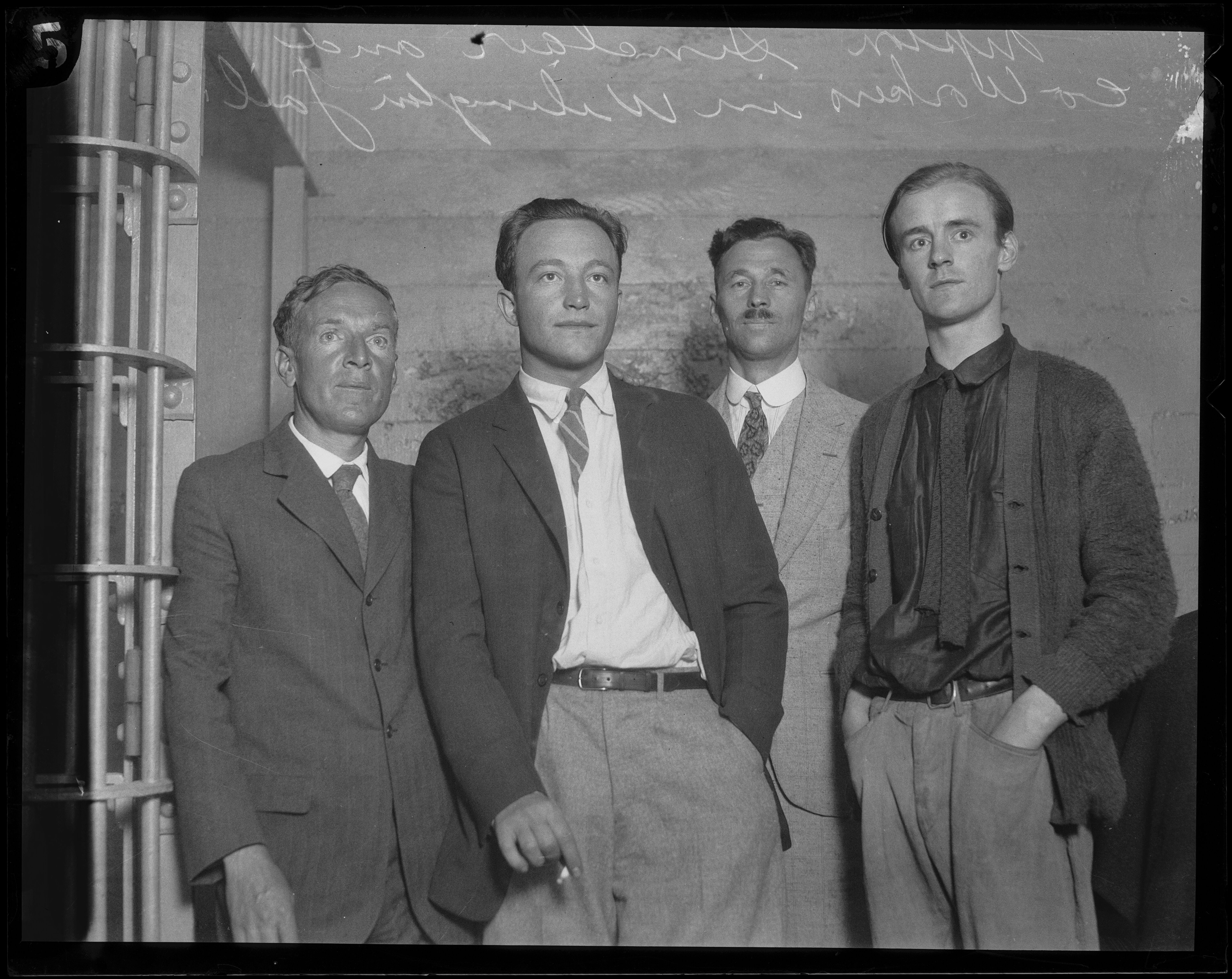
Upton Sinclair, Hunter Kimbrough, Pryns Hopkins and Hugh Hardyman in jail

Attending a rally for 600 striking dockworkers in San Pedro, California, in 1923, Hopkins was arrested on what is today known as Liberty Hill with Sinclair, Sinclair's brother-in-law Hunter Kimbrough, and Hugh Hardyman, who attempted to recite the First Amendment to the Constitution, or Free Speech Amendment.

By 1924, Prynce and Eileen returned to England. They adopted a son, Peter, and in 1925, Eileen gave birth to Eileen Mary (known as "Betty May"). In 1929, Eileen divorced Prynce and married a "former suitor," Vernon Armitage. Peter and Betty May became the wards of Armitage after Eileen's death in 1933.

Prynce married Florence Gertrude "Fay" Cartledge (b.1910) in 1933. They took a "round the world" honeymoon and returned to live in London where Prynce resumed teaching at University College London. In 1936, he became an editor of the academic journal, Science & Society: A Journal of Marxist Thought and Analysis. Their daughter Jennifer was born in 1938. After the outbreak of World War II, Prynce, Fay, his mother-in-law Dorette, and his two daughters (Jennifer and Betty May) sailed for New York in October 1940. The family lived first in Berkeley and then Pasadena – where Prynce started Freedom magazine and taught at Claremont College. In 1943, Fay gave birth to their son, David. Two years later, in 1945, Prynce ran (unsuccessfully) for the Democratic office of state Representative. Fay and Prynce were divorced in 1947. Prynce left Pasadena to live with his aging mother in Santa Barbara; and Fay married Stephen Enke in 1949.

In the last ten years of his life, Prynce continued writing and traveled to Morocco, Burma, Iran, India, Israel, and Egypt. He hosted his children and grandchildren, international friends, and meetings of the World Federalists and Ethical Culture Society in the modern home he built in Santa Barbara after his mother's death in 1955. He gave lectures at the Adult Education Center and set up trust funds for charitable donations to various causes he had always supported – such as Planned Parenthood and abortion law reform. Prynce Hopkins died in Santa Barbara on August 16, 1970, at the age of 85 after returning from a solo trip to the World's Fair in Japan (Expo '70). (ref. Jennifer Hopkins)

== Freedom magazine ==
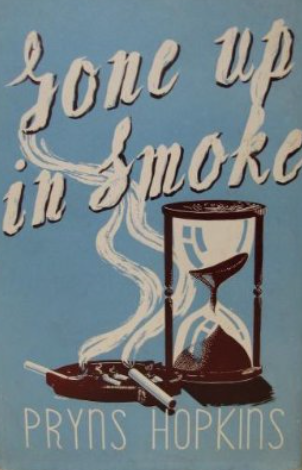
Gone Up in Smoke, 1948

While living in Pasadena, California, during World War II, Hopkins founded a magazine entitled Freedom: A Quarterly Commentary On All Aspects of Liberty. The publication offered an assortment of medical, social, psychological and pacifist reports to its small, but supportive, circle of readers.

Contributors to Freedom included an eclectic group of writers: Mahatma Gandhi contributed an article on the role of women; Dr. Daniel H. Kress, one of the first physicians to recognize the health dangers of tobacco, also contributed content; and Harold F. Bing, who was imprisoned during World War I as a conscientious objector and was active in War Resisters' International, wrote regularly for the magazine. Among other contributors were, Dr. Abraham H. Maslow, considered the father of Humanism in psychology; Ada Farris, a writer for Script and The Saturday Evening Post; and Gilean Douglas, who wrote for New Mexico Quarterly. Los Angeles artist Leo Politi served as art director and regularly contributed illustrations.

== Anti-smoking activism ==
Hopkins authored the book Gone Up in Smoke: An Analysis of Tobaccoism, in 1948. He was an early observer to warn the public of medical and social problems associated with tobacco. He documented the shortened life and diseases caused by smoking.

John Harvey Kellogg first used the term "Tobaccoism" in 1923. At age 21, Hopkins visited the Battle Creek Sanitarium for his father's treatment in 1906 when Kellogg was the medical superintendent.

== Published works ==
- The Germ (Santa Barbara, Calif.: 1913)
- Dawn (Santa Barbara, Calif., 1914-?)
- More Prussian Than Prussia? A Survey of American Conditions (Santa Barbara, Calif., 1917)
- The Ethics of Murder: From the Lay View-Point (1918)
- The Philosophy of Helpfulness (Minneapolis, Minn.: Pioneer Printers, [1920])
- Father or Sons? A Study in Social Psychology (London: Kegan Paul, Trench, Trubner, 1927)
- The Psychology of Social Movements: A Psycho-Analytic View of Society (London: G. Allen & Unwin, 1938)
- Aids to Successful Study (London: G. Allen & Unwin, 1941)
- From Gods to Dictators: Psychology of Religions and their Totalitarian Substitutes (Girard, Kan.: Haldeman-Julius Publications, 1944)
- World Culture (Pasadena, Calif.: Freedom Publications, 1945)
- Gone Up in Smoke: An Analysis of Tobaccoism (Culver City, Calif.: The Highland Press, 1948)
- A Westerner Looks East (Los Angeles: Warren F. Lewis, 1951)
- Both Hands Before The Fire (Penobscot, Me.: Traversity Press, 1962)
- The Social Psychology of Religious Experience (New York: Paine-Whitman, 1962)
- World Invisible (Penobscot, Me.: Traversity Press, 1963)
- Orientation, Socialization and Individuation (London: Asia Publishing House, 1963)
