= Sylvia Bernstein (screenwriter) =

American screenwriter and playwright

- Born: Sylvia Frances Bernstein; December 31, 1900; Brooklyn, New York, USA
- Died: October 22, 1979 (aged 78); Los Angeles, California, USA
- Occupation(s): Screenwriter, playwright
- Spouses: Louis Banks; John Hartley Seid
- Parent: Isadore Bernstein

Sylvia Bernstein (sometimes credited as Sylvia Bernstein Seid or Sylvia Seid) was an American screenwriter and playwright active in Hollywood in the late 1920s.

He was born in Brooklyn, and her father was screenwriter Isadore Bernstein. She was of Jewish ancestry. She eventually moved out to Los Angeles with her family, where she began working as a screenwriter. She was married twice: first to Louis Banks and then to John Hartley Seid.

== Selected filmography ==
- The Lariat Kid (1929)
- One Splendid Hour (1929)
- Montmartre Rose (1929)
- The Royal Rider (1929)
- Wild Beauty (1927)
