= The Flyin' Buckaroo =

1928 film

Flyin' Buckaroo
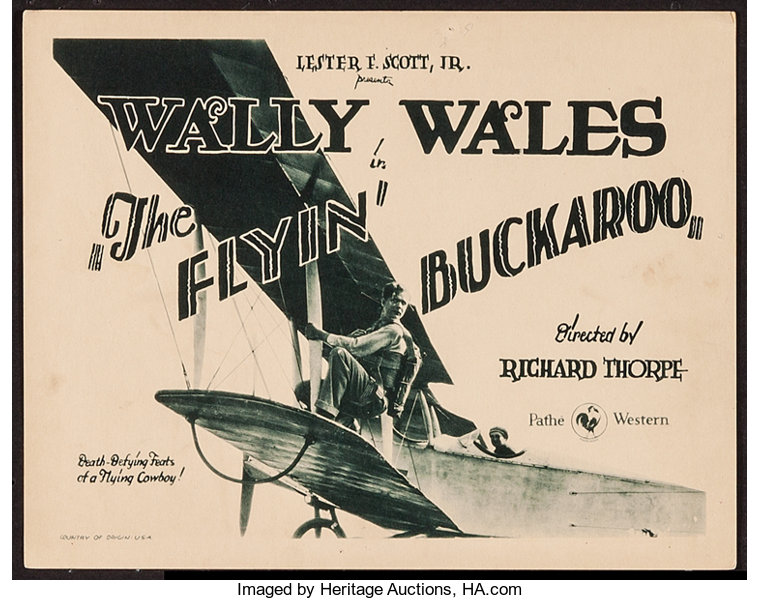
- Directed by: Richard Thorpe
- Written by: Betty Burbridge; Richard Thorpe
- Starring: Hal Taliaferro; Jack D'Oise; J.P. Lockney
- Narrated by: Lester F. Scott Jr.
- Cinematography: Ray Ries
- Production company: Action Pictures
- Distributed by: Pathé Exchange
- Release date: November 25, 1928
- Running time: 5 reels
- Country: United States
- Languages: Silent; English intertitles

The Flyin' Buckaroo is a lost 1928 American silent Western film directed by Richard Thorpe and starring Hal Taliaferro, Jack D'Oise and J.P. Lockney.

== Cast ==
- Hal Taliaferro as Bill Mathews
- Jack D'Oise as Henry Mathews
- J.P. Lockney as Mr. Mathews
- Fanny Midgley as Mrs. Mathews
- Duane Thompson as Sally Brown
- Mabel Van Buren as Mrs. Brown
- Charles K. French as Banker Brown
- Slim Whitaker as Delno (the bandit)
- Helen Marlowe as City girl
- Bud McClure as Sheriff

== Preservation ==
With no holdings located in archives, The Flyin' Buckaroo is considered a lost film.

== Bibliography ==
- David Quinlan. Quinlan's Film Directors. Batsford, 1999.
