= The Cowboy Cavalier =

1928 film

- Directed by: Richard Thorpe
- Written by: Betty Burbridge; Richard Thorpe
- Starring: Buddy Roosevelt; Olive Hasbrouck; Charles K. French
- Cinematography: Ray Ries
- Production company: Action Pictures
- Distributed by: Pathé Exchange
- Release date: January 29, 1928
- Running time: 75 min (4,526ft)
- Country: United States
- Languages: Silent; English intertitles

The Cowboy Cavalier is a 1928 American silent Western film directed by Richard Thorpe and starring Buddy Roosevelt, Olive Hasbrouck and Charles K. French.

== Plot ==
In this mystery-drama of the open range, a young woman loses her memory when she sees her uncle brutally slain. The hero, a deputy sheriff, aims to solve the murder. The young woman comes under suspicion, and the nephews seeks to frame her. The deputy befriends the girl and clears her name. The girl recovers her mental balance and marries him.

== Cast ==
- Buddy Roosevelt as Prince Charming - Deputy Sheriff
- Olive Hasbrouck as Cinderella 'Cindy'
- Charles K. French
- Fanny Midgley
- Robert D. Walker
- Bob Clark
- William Ryno

== Reception ==
The Film Daily review of the film wrote, "Same old hero tactics but story has slight variations that make for some added interest. More plot and less action in this one."

== Preservation ==
With no holdings located in archives, The Cowboy Cavalier is considered a lost film.
