= Lawrence Underwood =

American actor

- Born: 1871; Albia, Iowa, U.S.
- Died: February 2, 1939 (aged 67–68); Los Angeles, California, U.S.
- Occupations: Actor, writer, director

Lawrence Underwood (1871 – February 2, 1939) was an American stage and screen actor, writer, and director. He played in many movies, including Old Lady 31, The Phantom Buster and King of the Royal Mounted.

== Selected filmography ==
- Galloping On (1925)
- Twisted Triggers (1926)
