= Big Timber (1924 film) =

1924 film

- Directed by: George Melford
- Written by: Isadore Bernstein; George Melford
- Based on: The Heart of the Night Wind by Vingie E. Roe
- Produced by: Carl Laemmle
- Starring: William Desmond; Olive Hasbrouck; Betty Francisco
- Cinematography: Jackson Rose
- Production company: Universal Pictures
- Distributed by: Universal Pictures
- Release date: September 7, 1924
- Running time: 50 minutes
- Country: United States
- Language: Silent (English intertitles)

Big Timber is a 1924 American silent drama film directed by George Melford and starring William Desmond, Olive Hasbrouck and Betty Francisco. It is adapted from a 1913 novel The Heart of the Night Wind by Vingie E. Roe. It is not a remake of the 1917 film of the same title, itself based on a novel by Bertrand William Sinclair.

== Cast ==
- William Desmond as Walter Sandry
- Olive Hasbrouck as Sally O'Hara
- Betty Francisco as Poppy Ordway
- Ivor McFadden as John Daly
- Lydia Yeamans Titus as Ma Daly
- Albert J. Smith as Fred Hampden

== Bibliography ==
- Goble, Alan. The Complete Index to Literary Sources in Film. Walter de Gruyter, 1999.
- Connelly, Robert B. The Silents: Silent Feature Films, 1910-36, Volume 40, Issue 2. December Press, 1998.
- Munden, Kenneth White. The American Film Institute Catalog of Motion Pictures Produced in the United States, Part 1. University of California Press, 1997.
