= Wally Wales =

American actor

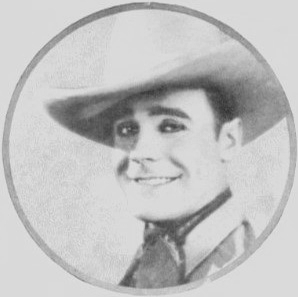
- Born: Floyd Taliaferro Alderson; November 13, 1895; Sheridan, Wyoming, U.S.
- Died: February 10, 1980 (aged 84); Sheridan, Wyoming, U.S.
- Years active: 1921–1964

Floyd Taliaferro Alderson (November 13, 1895 – February 10, 1980) was an American film actor who specialized in westerns. After serving in the Great War, he began his career in the era of silent films, when he frequently used the name Wally Wales.

Although he transitioned to sound, he was given smaller parts, and used the name Hal Taliaferro. He appeared in more than 220 films between 1921 and 1964. He lived his later life in Montana at his family ranch.

== Biography ==
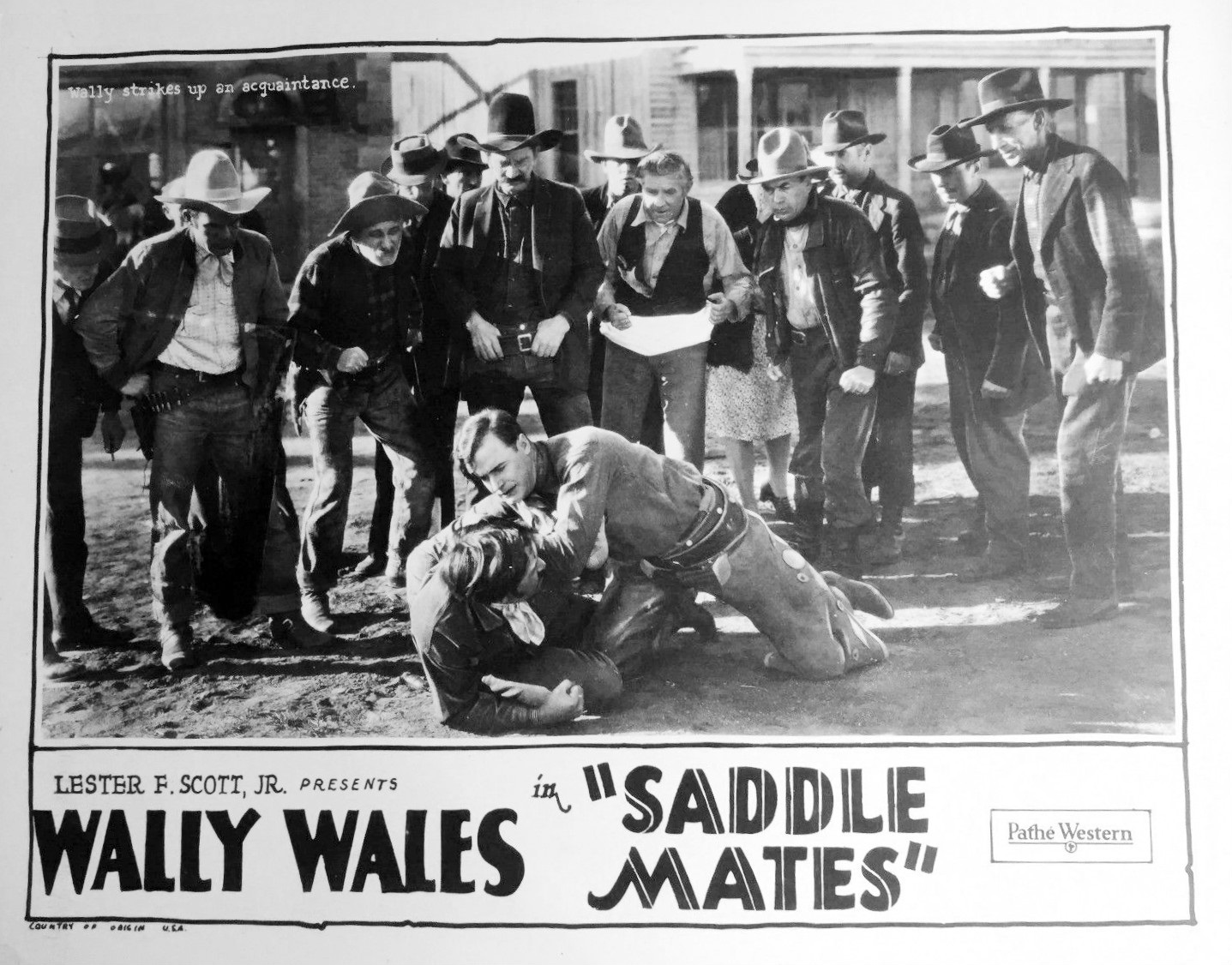
Lobby card for Saddle Mates (1928)

Born Floyd Taliaferro Alderson in 1895 in Sheridan, Wyoming, he was raised on his family's ranch, near Birney in Rosebud County, Montana.

Young Alderson's first "outside" job was on a cattle drive for rancher John B. Kendrick. He also drove a tourist stage for the Buffalo Bill Stage line before drifting west in 1915. He settled in Los Angeles where he worked as a wrangler on Universal's ranch.

In 1917 during the Great War, Alderson joined the army and served in the American Expeditionary Forces in France. After his return to the US, he became involved in films as an actor.

From 1921 through 1928 he appeared in twenty-two silent films (mainly Westerns), starring in many under the name Wally Wales. In 1929 he made the successful transition to sound, or "talkies". But gradually his star faded, and he began appearing in much smaller roles, usually as Hal Taliaferro.

He retired from films in the early 1950s and returned to his family ranch in Montana. It was then known as the Bones Brothers Ranch. He built a cabin there and lived out his remaining active years painting landscapes.

He died in a Sheridan, Wyoming nursing home from complications of a stroke and pneumonia in 1980, at age 84. In 2004 the Bones Brothers Ranch was listed on the National Register of Historical Places (NRHP).

== Filmography ==
Lobby card for Pals of the West (1934)

Year	Title	Role	Notes
1921	Western Hearts	Pete Marcel	as Floyd Taliaferro
1921	Crossing Trails	Peter Marcus	
1925	Tearin' Loose	Wally Blake	
1925	The Hurricane Horseman	Wally Marden	
1925	Galloping On	Wally Moore	
1926	The Roaring Rider		Uncredited
1926	The Fighting Cheat	Wally Kenyon	
1926	Vanishing Hoofs	Wally Marsh	
1926	Ridin' Rivals		
1926	Double Daring	Wally Meeker	
1926	Twisted Triggers	Wally Weston	
1926	Ace of Action	Wally Rand	
1927	The Cyclone Cowboy	Wally Baxter	
1927	Tearin' Into Trouble	Wally Tilland	
1927	The Meddlin' Stranger	Wally Fraser	
1927	Skedaddle Gold	Kent Blake	
1927	White Pebbles	Zip Wallace	
1927	Soda Water Cowboy	Wally	
1927	The Desert of the Lost	Jim Drake	
1927	Pals of the West		
1928	Desperate Courage	Jim Dane	
1928	Saddle Mates	John Benson	
1928	The Flyin' Buckaroo	Bill Mathews	
1929	Overland Bound	Buck Hawkins	
1929	The Voice from the Sky	Jack Deering	
1930	Bar-L Ranch	Frank Kellogg	
1930	Canyon Hawks	Dick Carson	
1930	Trails of Danger	Bob Bartlett	
1930	The Utah Kid	Deputy	Uncredited
1930	Breed of the West	Wally Weldon	
1931	Red Fork Range	Wally Hamilton	
1931	Hell's Valley	Wally, Texas Rangers Captain	
1931	Riders of the Cactus	Bob Bronson	
1931	Flying Lariats	Wally Dunbar	
1931	So This Is Arizona	Bob Ransome	
1932	Law and Lawless	Buck Daggett	
1933	Deadwood Pass	Pete Sorrenson	
1933	Rusty Rides Alone	Hank Quillan	Uncredited
1933	King of the Arena	Bronc Riding Spectator	Uncredited
1933	The Fighting Texans	Henchman Bill	
1933	Secrets of Hollywood	An Actor	
1933	The Trail Drive	Henchman Steve	Uncredited
1933	Sagebrush Trail	Deputy Sheriff	
1933	The Mystery Squadron	Mystery Flyer	Serial, [Chs. 5–6, 10], Uncredited
1934	Potluck Pards	Bud Wallace	Short, as Walt Williams
1934	The Lucky Texan	Henchman	Uncredited
1934	Border Guns	Sheriff Tom	Uncredited
1934	West of the Divide	Henchman	Uncredited
1934	Wheels of Destiny	Cowhand	Uncredited
1934	Adventures of Texas Jack	Texas Jack	
1934	Nevada Cyclone	Dick	Short, as Walt Williams
1934	The Lost Jungle	Crewman	
1934	Romance Revier	Frank Wells	Short, as Walt Williams
1934	Western Racketeers	Sheriff Rawlings	
1934	Honor of the Range	Third Man Nominating Boots	Uncredited
1934	Arizona Cyclone	Jim Blaine	Short
1934	The Fighting Rookie	Gambler	
1934	Sundown Trail	Wally Barton	Short
1934	Smoking Guns	Henchman	Uncredited
1934	The Lost Jungle	Sandy (Mary R crewman)	Uncredited
1934	Carrying the Mail	Wally Reed	Short
1934	Desert Man	Wally Bradley	Short
1934	Fighting Through	Frisco	Uncredited
1934	Pals of the West	Captain Wally Wallace	Short
1934	The Law of the Wild	Deputy Tom	Serial, [Chs. 7-8], Uncredited
1934	The Lone Rider	Jeff Smith	Short
1934	The Way of the West	Wally Gordon	
1934	West of the Law	Wally Williams (ranch foreman)	Short
1934	The Oil Raider	Oil Well Driller	Uncredited
1934	Range Warfare	Tommy Lord	
1934	Mystery Mountain	Corwin Teamster	Uncredited
1935	The Cactus Kid	Cowhand Andy	
1935	Unconquered Bandit	Henchman	Uncredited
1935	The Rustlers of Red Dog	Henchman Wally	Uncredited
1935	The Lone Bandit	Sheriff Jim Mace	
1935	Six Gun Justice	Nevada Joe	
1935	The Phantom Empire	Thunder guard	Uncredited
1935	Five Bad Men	Bad man #4	
1935	The Pecos Kid	Eric Grayson	
1935	The Cowboy and the Bandit	Chuck	
1935	The Miracle Rider	Ranger Burnett	Uncredited
1935	The Call of the Savage	Lancer Officer-in-Charge	Serial, [Chs. 10-12], Uncredited
1935	Silent Valley	Fred Jones	
1935	Fighting Caballero	Henchman Wildcat	
1935	The Silver Bullet	Deputy Jake	as Walt Williams
1935	The Laramie Kid	Road Gang Guard	Uncredited
1935	Stranded	Peterson	Uncredited
1935	The Vanishing Riders	Wolf Lawson	
1935	Get That Man	Thomas, Prescott Chaueffeur	Uncredited
1935	Men of Action	Henchman Wally	Uncredited
1935	Danger Trails	'Desolation' Wilson	
1935	Heir to Trouble	Cowhand Spurs	
1935	Powdersmoke Range	Aloysius 'Bud' Taggart	
1935	Between Men	Blacksmith Luke	Uncredited
1935	Western Courage	Slim	Uncredited
1935	Gun Play	George Holt	
1935	Lawless Riders	Sidekick Carl Walton	
1935	Swifty	Price McNiel	
1935	Trigger Tom	Sam Slater	
1935	The Shadow of Silk Lennox	Inspector Swann	Uncredited
1936	Lucky Terror	Henchman Shake	Uncredited
1936	Hair-Trigger Casey	Dave Casey	
1936	Heroes of the Range	Trail Boss	Uncredited
1936	Avenging Waters	Slivers	
1936	The Crime Patrol	Henchman Driving Getaway Car	Uncredited
1936	The Phantom Rider	Henchman Lew	
1936	The Traitor	Texas Ranger Hank	Uncredited
1936	The Unknown Ranger	Chuckler	as Hal Talioferro
1936	Ambush Valley	Joel Potter	
1936	Law and Lead	Steve Bradley, posing as The Juarez Kid	
1936	The Gun Ranger	Hanby - Outspoken Juror	Uncredited
1936	Rio Grande Ranger	Ranger Hal Garrick	
1937	Two Gun Law	Cattle Buyer	Uncredited
1937	Law of the Ranger	Wally Hood	
1937	Rootin' Tootin' Rhythm	Buffalo Brady	
1937	The Painted Stallion	Jim Bowie	
1937	One Man Justice	Neal King	
1937	The Rangers Step In	Breck Warren	
1937	Heart of the Rockies	Captain Brady - Blackstone Park	
1937	Trapped by G-Men	Federal Agent	
1937	The Trigger Trio	Henchman Luke	
1937	Wells Fargo	Minor Role	Uncredited
1938	The Lone Ranger	Bob Stuart	
1938	Stagecoach Days	Milt Dodds	
1938	The Great Adventures of Wild Bill Hickok	Townsman talking to Boys	Uncredited
1938	Pioneer Trail	Henchman Smokey	
1938	South of Arizona	Murdered Ranger Frank Madison	Uncredited
1938	Phantom Gold	Dan	
1938	Black Bandit	Weepy	
1938	Crime Takes a Holiday	Farrell	Uncredited
1938	Guilty Trails	Sundown Ansel	
1938	Prairie Justice	Alfalfa	
1938	Rio Grande	Bart Andrews	Uncredited
1939	The Thundering West	Frank Kendall	
1939	Frontiers of '49	Kit	
1939	North of the Yukon	Henchman	Uncredited
1939	Man of Conquest	Tennessean	Uncredited
1939	Western Caravans	Joel Winters	
1939	Overland with Kit Carson	Jim Stewart	
1939	Riders of the Frontier	Henchman Buck	
1939	Fugitive at Large	Truck Guard	Uncredited
1939	Daughter of the Tong	FBI Agent Lawson	
1939	Outpost of the Mounties	Evans	
1939	The Story of Charles Goodyear	Baker	Short
1939	Saga of Death Valley	Henchman Rex	
1939	The Stranger from Texas	Clay Billings	
1939	Two-Fisted Rangers	Sheriff Jim Hanley	
1939	Zorro's Fighting Legion	Dungeon Thug	Uncredited
1940	Bullets for Rustlers	Eb Smith	
1940	Pioneers of the West	Jed Clark	
1940	Dark Command	Angry Townsman in Bank	Uncredited
1940	The Man with Nine Lives	Sheriff Ed Stanton	
1940	Adventures of Red Ryder	Cherokee Sims	
1940	The Carson City Kid	Rick Harmon	
1940	Colorado	Weaver	
1940	Cherokee Strip	Ben Blivens	
1940	Young Bill Hickok	Morrell	
1940	Texas Terrors	John Millbourne	Uncredited
1940	The Border Legion	Sheriff Amos Link	
1940	Hi-Yo Silver	Bob Stuart	(archive footage)
1941	Along the Rio Grande	Sweetwater Sheriff	
1941	The Great Train Robbery	Pierce	
1941	In Old Cheyenne	Henchman Pete	
1941	Border Vigilantes	Henchman Big Ed Stone	
1941	Sheriff of Tombstone	A.J. Slade	
1941	Law of the Range	Tim O'Brien	
1941	Under Fiesta Stars	Smoky - Rodeo Announcer	Uncredited
1941	Bad Man of Deadwood	Henchman Ripper	
1941	Riders of the Timberline	Ed Petrie	
1941	Roaring Frontiers	Link Twiddle	
1941	Jesse James at Bay	Paul Sloan, Lawyer	
1941	Red River Valley	Murdock	
1942	Bullets for Bandits	Croupier	Uncredited
1942	Romance on the Range	Sheriff Wilson	
1942	Tombstone: The Town Too Tough to Die	Dick Mason	
1942	Sons of the Pioneers	Henchman Matt	
1942	King of the Mounties	Ed Johnson	Serial, (Ch. 6), Uncredited
1942	Little Joe, the Wrangler	Ben Travis	
1942	Heart of the Golden West	Henchman Drake	Uncredited
1942	American Empire	Malone	
1942	Ridin' Down the Canyon	Henchman Pete	
1943	Idaho	Bud (Belle's henchman)	
1943	Hoppy Serves a Writ	Henchman Greg Jordan	
1943	It's a Great Life	Master of the Hounds	Uncredited
1943	The Leather Burners	Telegrapher Lafe	
1943	Song of Texas	Henchman	
1943	Colt Comrades	Murder Freight Agent	Uncredited
1943	Frontier Law	Frank Rodgers	
1943	Silver Spurs	Steve Corlan	
1943	The Man from Music Mountain	Henchman Slade	
1943	Cowboy in the Clouds	Haldey	
1943	The Woman of the Town	Wagner	
1944	The Fighting Seabees	Lt. Commander. Hood	Uncredited
1944	Lumberjack	Henchman Taggart	
1944	Cowboy and the Senorita	Matt Ferguson	
1944	Forty Thieves	Jess Clanton	
1944	The Yellow Rose of Texas	Ferguson	
1944	Atlantic City	Businessman	Uncredited
1944	Haunted Harbor	Lawson	Serial, [Ch. 1, 6-7]
1944	Vigilantes of Dodge City	Walter Bishop	
1944	Zorro's Black Whip	Henchman Baxter	
1945	Utah	Steve Lacy	
1945	Springtime in Texas	Henchman Red Higgins	
1945	Federal Operator 99	Matt Farrell	
1945	The Cheaters	Jim McDonald	Uncredited
1945	Fallen Angel	Gus Johnson - Police Officer	Uncredited
1945	San Antonio	Cowboy	Uncredited
1946	The Scarlet Horseman	Henchman	Uncredited
1946	The Phantom Rider	Nugget	
1946	Miss Susie Slagle's	Doctor	Uncredited
1946	In Old Sacramento	Doctor	Uncredited
1946	Heading West	Jim Mallory	Uncredited
1946	Plainsman and the Lady	Pete	
1947	Ramrod	Jess More	
1947	Heaven Only Knows	One of Byron's Gunmen	Uncredited
1948	West of Sonora	Sandy Clinton	Uncredited
1948	The Gallant Legion	Billy Smith	
1948	Red River	Old Leather	
1948	Blood on the Moon	Cowboy	Uncredited
1949	Brimstone	Dave Watts	
1950	Colt .45	Stagecoach Guard	Uncredited
1950	The Savage Horde	Sergeant Gowdy	
1950	California Passage	Buck Hanley	Uncredited
1951	The Sea Hornet	Bone	
1952	Junction City	Sandy Clinton	
1964	Law of the Lawless		Uncredited
