= Gun Play =

1935 film

- Directed by: Albert Herman
- Written by: William L. Nolte
- Produced by: Arthur Alexander; Max Alexander
- Starring: Guinn 'Big Boy' Williams; Marion Shilling; Frank Yaconelli
- Cinematography: William Hyer
- Edited by: Holbrook N. Todd
- Production companies: M & A Alexander Productions
- Distributed by: Hollywood Film Exchange; Metropolitan Film Exchange
- Release date: December 1, 1935
- Running time: 59 minutes
- Country: United States
- Language: English

Gun Play is a 1935 American Western film directed by Albert Herman and starring Guinn 'Big Boy' Williams, Marion Shilling and Frank Yaconelli.

== Cast ==
- Guinn 'Big Boy' Williams as Bill Williams
- Marion Shilling as Madge Holt
- Frank Yaconelli as Frank Gorman
- Hal Taliaferro as George Holt
- Charles K. French as Old John Holt
- Tom London as Meeker
- Roger Williams as Cal
- Gordon Griffith as Mark
- Barney Beasley as Pete
- Dick Botiller as General Tirado
- Julian Rivero as Young Pedro
- Helen Gibson as Woman at dance

== Bibliography ==
- Pitts, Michael R. Poverty Row Studios, 1929-1940. McFarland & Company, 2005.
