= Ace of Action =

1926 film

- Directed by: William Bertram
- Written by: Betty Burbridge
- Produced by: Lester F. Scott Jr.
- Starring: Hal Taliaferro; Alma Rayford; Charles Colby
- Cinematography: Ray Ries
- Production company: Action Pictures
- Distributed by: Associated Exhibitors
- Release date: November 28, 1926
- Running time: 5 reels
- Country: United States
- Languages: Silent; English intertitles

Ace of Action is a 1926 American silent Western film directed by William Bertram and starring Hal Taliaferro, Alma Rayford and Charles Colby.

== Plot synopsis ==
A feud develops between two families, the Waltons and the Darcys, regarding ownership of a valuable waterhole. John Walton believes the dispute should be settled by an outside party.

Farber, an attorney from back east, impersonates Walton's missing heir.

Wally Rand, is a young cowboy and innocent bystander who falls in love with June Darcy. Wally is drawn into the feud when he is mistaken for Walton's rightful heir.

Farber is exposed as an imposter and is arrested.

Lafe Darcy and Farber plot to kidnap Wally, but June frees him. Wally fights with Lafe and ultimately resolves the differences and settles the feud.

== Cast ==
- Hal Taliaferro as Wally Rand
- Alma Rayford as June Darcy
- Charles Colby as Farber
- Hank Bell
- Slim Whitaker
- Fanny Midgley
- William T. Hayes
- Frank Ellis
