= Ride 'em High =

1927 film

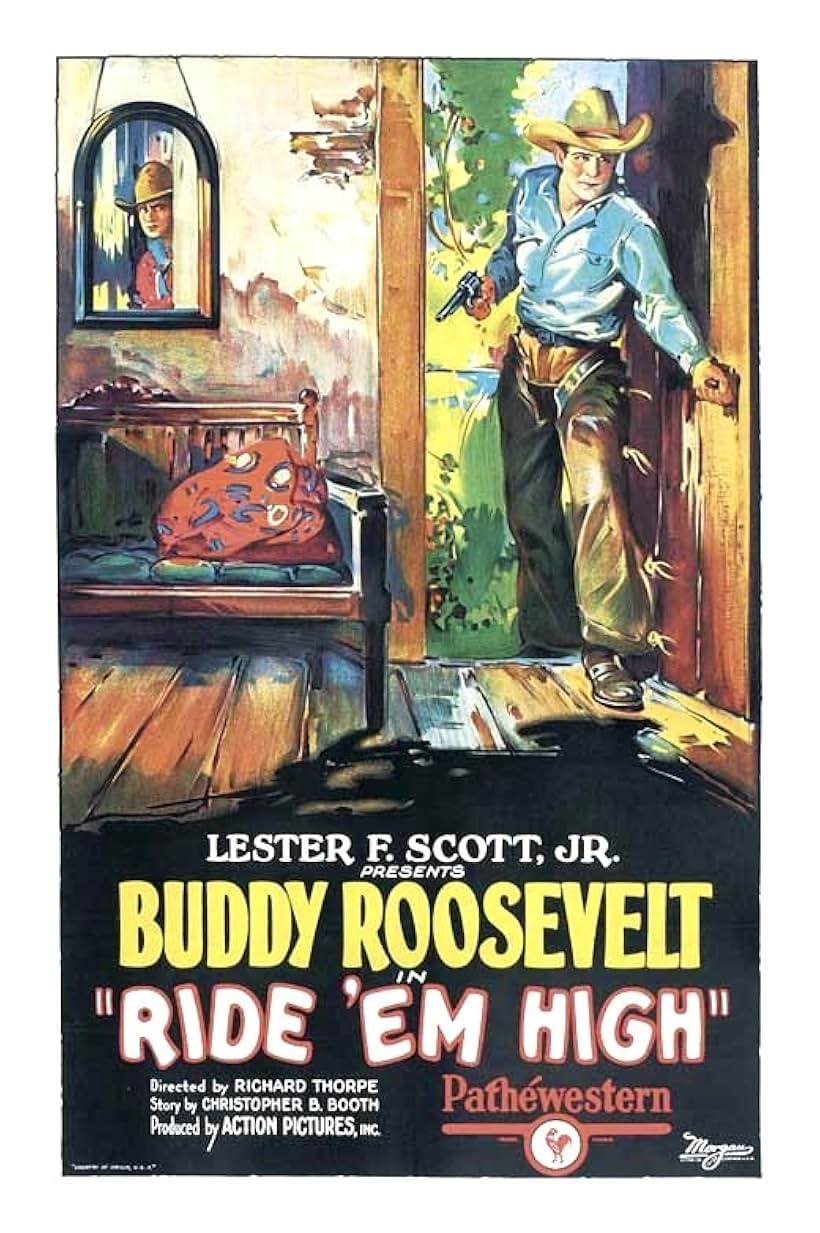
- Directed by: Richard Thorpe
- Written by: Christopher Booth; Richard Thorpe
- Produced by: Lester F. Scott Jr.
- Starring: Buddy Roosevelt; Olive Hasbrouck; George Magrill
- Cinematography: Ray Ries
- Production company: Action Pictures
- Distributed by: Pathe Exchange
- Release date: October 9, 1927
- Running time: 50 minutes
- Country: United States
- Languages: Silent; English intertitles

Ride 'em High is a 1927 American silent Western film directed by Richard Thorpe and starring Buddy Roosevelt, Olive Hasbrouck and George Magrill.

== Cast ==
- Buddy Roosevelt as Jim Demming
- Olive Hasbrouck as Betty Allen
- George Magrill as Paul Fisher
- Charles K. French as Bill Demming
- Robert Homans as Rufus Allen

== Bibliography ==
- Langman, Larry. A Guide to Silent Westerns. Greenwood Publishing Group, 1992.
