= Set Free (1927 film) =

1927 film

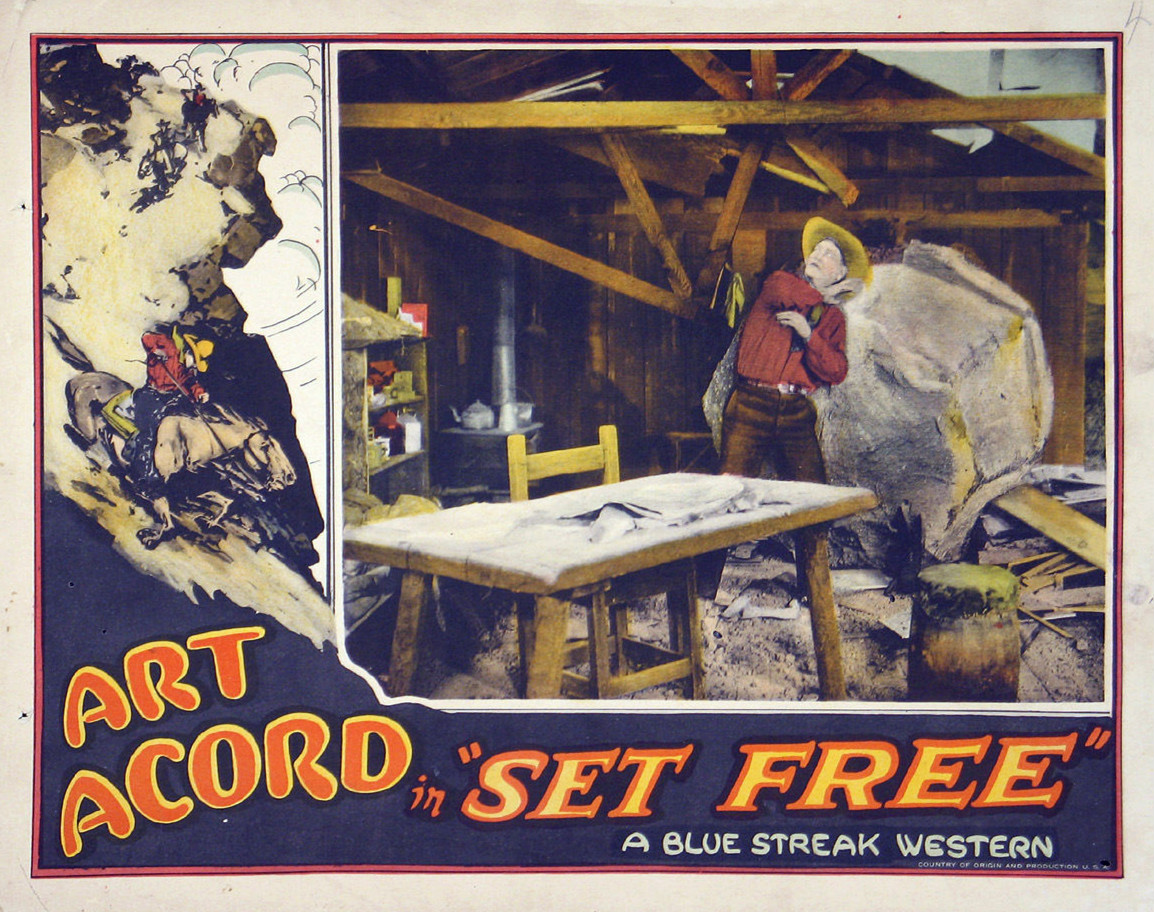
- Lobby card
- Directed by: Arthur Rosson
- Written by: Harrison Jacobs
- Produced by: Carl Laemmle
- Starring: Art Acord; Olive Hasbrouck; Claude Payton
- Cinematography: Edward Linden
- Production company: Universal Pictures
- Distributed by: Universal Pictures
- Release date: March 6, 1927
- Running time: 50 minutes
- Country: United States
- Language: Silent (English intertitles)

Set Free is a 1927 American silent Western film directed by Arthur Rosson and starring Art Acord, Olive Hasbrouck, and Claude Payton.

== Plot ==
As described in a film magazine, a stranger known as "Side Show Saunders," who entertains the crowd in front of the general store with his horse, dog, and banjo, wins only the contempt of Holly Farrell, the pretty ward of Sam Cole, the proprietor of the store, who has her opinion of a man who will let a poor horse and dog earn his living for him. Saunders, overhearing, tells her he is willing to work, so she offers him, with Cole's permission, a job in the store. Here he becomes popular with the townspeople and Holly as everybody likes him except Buck Tanner, a sleek individual who has secured Holly's promise to marry him. Saunders learns from Cole that Holly is the orphan of the late "Foolish" Farrell, so-called because he put his last cent in a worthless gold mine known as Farrell's Folly. Tanner is the manager of the Queen mine, from which rich deposits have been taken, entitling the miners to a bonus of $40,000 which Tanner and his henchmen plan to get away with. At this opportune moment Tanner hears that Saunders is an escaped convict and it suits his purpose to place the blame for the forthcoming robbery on him, so he first informs Holly that Saunders is "wanted" and then lures him, by means of a forged note, to the supposedly deserted hut at Farrell's Folly Mine. Here Tanner and two henchmen overcome Saunders who lies on the floor stunned by a blow. Another of Tanner's henchmen then turns up unexpectedly and says that he has discovered a rich gold vein in the Folly Mine which he has been working in secret. Tanner, seeing a chance to make millions by simply marrying the young woman who owns the mine, decides to give up the idea of stealing the $40,000 and drives to the town to find Holly, leaving Saunders, who is apparently unconscious, locked in the hut. Holly, who does not love him but is scrupulous about keeping promises, goes with him to the county seat to be married. Saunders' horse and dog loosen a boulder that crashes through the hut, freeing him. He races to the general store where Tanner's henchmen accuse him of being an escaped convict. They incite the mob against him, but Saunders escapes to the county seat, pursued by the townsmen. He reaches the justice's office in time to stop the wedding. The sheriff enters and Tanner accuses Saunders, but Tanner and his helpers are the quarry the sheriff is after. Saunders then exhibits his credentials as a detective sent to run down the Tanner gang. The report that he was an ex-convict was circulated by himself to trap Tanner, but the report that he is in love with the young woman and is going to marry her right away is true.

== Cast ==
- Art Acord as 'Side Show' Saunders
- Olive Hasbrouck as Holly Farrell
- Claude Payton as Burke Tanner
- Robert McKenzie as Sam Cole
- Harry Tenbrook as Jim Hart
- Gloria Davenport as Josephine Dokes
- Curley Witzel as Henchman
- Buck Moulton as Hicks
- Fred Burns as Hale
- Jess Deffenbach as Deputy Sheriff

== Preservation ==
With no prints of Set Free located in any film archives, it is a lost film.

== Bibliography ==
- Robert B. Connelly. The Silents: Silent Feature Films, 1910-36, Volume 40, Issue 2. December Press, 1998.
