= Clear the Decks =

1929 film

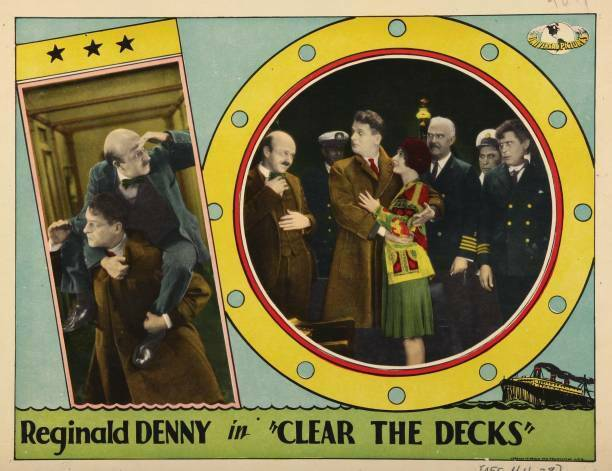
- Directed by: Joseph Henabery
- Screenplay by: Earle Snell; Gladys Lehman; Albert DeMond; Charles Henry Smith
- Based on: When the Devil Was Sick by E.J. Rath
- Starring: Reginald Denny; Olive Hasbrouck; Otis Harlan; Lucien Littlefield; Collette Merton; Robert Anderson
- Cinematography: Arthur L. Todd
- Edited by: Bernard W. Burton; John English
- Production company: Universal Pictures
- Distributed by: Universal Pictures
- Release date: March 3, 1929
- Running time: 70 minutes
- Country: United States
- Languages: Sound (Part-Talkie); English Intertitles

Clear the Decks is a 1929 American sound part-talkie comedy film directed by Joseph Henabery and written by Earle Snell, Gladys Lehman, Albert DeMond and Charles Henry Smith. In addition to sequences with audible dialogue or talking sequences, the film features a synchronized musical score and sound effects along with English intertitles. The soundtrack was recorded using the Western Electric sound-on-film system. The film is based on the 1926 novel When the Devil Was Sick by E.J. Rath. The film stars Reginald Denny, Olive Hasbrouck, Otis Harlan, Lucien Littlefield, Collette Merton and Robert Anderson. The film was released on March 3, 1929, by Universal Pictures.

== Cast ==
- Reginald Denny as Jack Armitage
- Olive Hasbrouck as Miss Bronson
- Otis Harlan as Pussyfoot
- Lucien Littlefield as Plinge
- Collette Merton as Blondie
- Robert Anderson as Mate
- Elinor Leslie as Aunt
- Brooks Benedict as Trumbull

== See also ==
- List of early sound feature films (1926–1929)
