= Tearin' Into Trouble =

1927 film

- Directed by: Richard Thorpe
- Written by: John Harold Hamlin; Betty Burbridge
- Produced by: Lester F. Scott Jr.
- Starring: Hal Taliaferro; Olive Hasbrouck; Walter Brennan
- Cinematography: Ray Ries
- Production company: Action Pictures
- Distributed by: Pathe Exchange
- Release date: March 20, 1927
- Running time: 50 minutes
- Country: United States
- Languages: Silent; English intertitles

Tearin' Into Trouble is a lost 1927 American silent Western film directed by Richard Thorpe and starring Hal Taliaferro, Olive Hasbrouck and Walter Brennan.

== Cast ==
- Hal Taliaferro as Wally Tilland
- Olive Hasbrouck as Ruth Martin
- Walter Brennan as Billy Martin
- Tom Bay as Johnnie
- Nita Cavalier as Maisie

== Preservation ==
With no holdings located in archives, Tearin' Into Trouble is considered a lost film.

== Bibliography ==
- Langman, Larry. A Guide to Silent Westerns. Greenwood Publishing Group, 1992.
