= The Lariat Kid =

1929 film

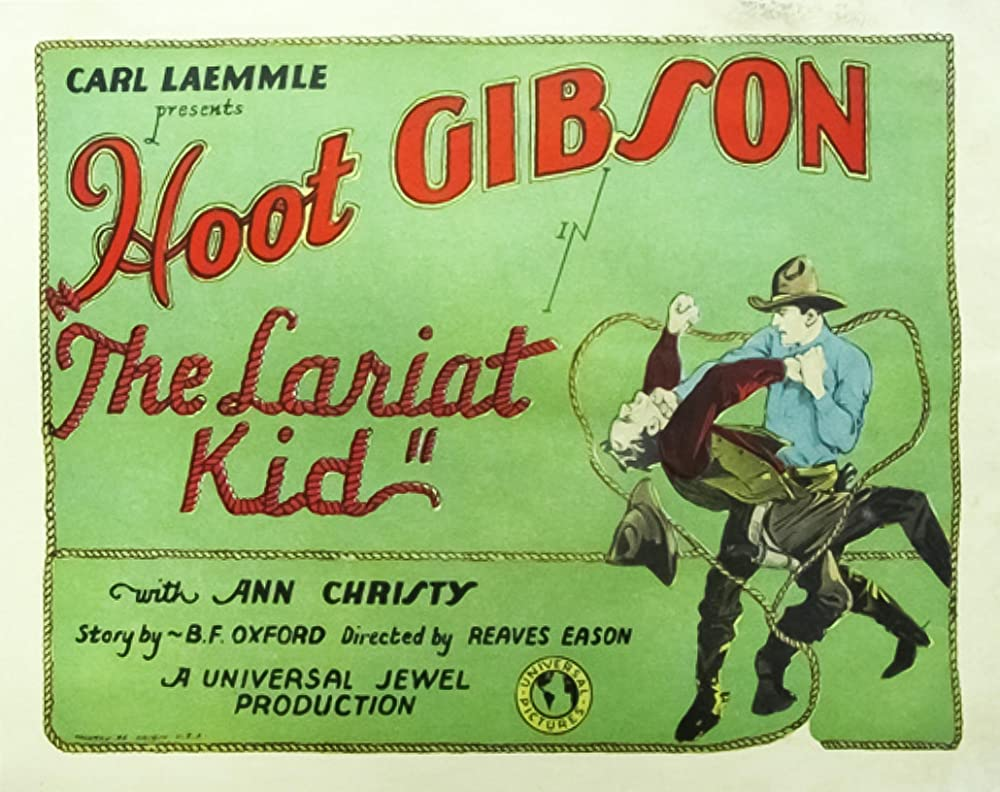
- Directed by: B. Reeves Eason
- Written by: Buckleigh Fritz Oxford (story); Jacques Jaccard; Sylvia Bernstein; Harold Tarshis
- Produced by: Carl Laemmle
- Starring: Hoot Gibson
- Cinematography: Harry Neumann
- Edited by: Gilmore Walker
- Distributed by: Universal Pictures
- Release date: May 12, 1929
- Running time: 62 minutes
- Country: United States
- Languages: Silent; English intertitles

The Lariat Kid is a lost 1929 American silent Western film directed by B. Reeves Eason and starring Hoot Gibson. It was produced and distributed by Universal Pictures.

== Cast ==
- Hoot Gibson as Tom Richards
- Ann Christy as Mary Lou
- Cap Anderson as Scar Hagerty
- Mary Foy as Aunt Bella
- Walter Brennan as Pat O'Shea
- Andy Waldron as George Carson
- Bud Osborne as Trigger Finger
- Joseph Bennett as Pecos Kid
- Jim Corey as Jackknife
- Francis Ford as Cal Gregg
- Joe Rickson as Tony
