= The Martyr Sex =

1924 film

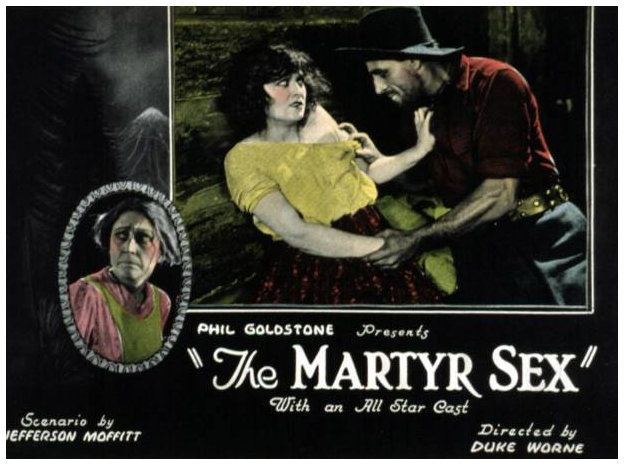
- Directed by: Duke Worne
- Written by: Leete Renick Brown; Jefferson Moffitt
- Produced by: Phil Goldstone
- Starring: William Fairbanks; Dorothy Revier; William Dyer
- Cinematography: Roland Price
- Production company: Phil Goldstone Productions
- Release date: April 8, 1924
- Running time: 50 minutes
- Country: United States
- Languages: Silent; English intertitles

The Martyr Sex is a 1924 American silent drama film directed by Duke Worne and starring William Fairbanks, Dorothy Revier and William Dyer. This film is now believed to be lost.

== Synopsis ==
In the rural South, a Doctor goes to a cabin where he amputates the arm of a brutish man Branch Paxton. Paxton later develops a vendetta against the doctor.

== Cast ==
- William Dyer Horseshoe Sam
- William Fairbanks as Dr. Ross Wayne
- Les Bates as Branch Paxton
- Billie Bennett as His Wife
- Dorothy Revier as Beulah Paxton
- Pat Harmon as Lem Paxton
- Frank Hagney as Ed Carter

== Bibliography ==
- Connelly, Robert B. The Silents: Silent Feature Films, 1910-36, Volume 40, Issue 2. December Press, 1998.
