= The Phantom Buster =

1927 film

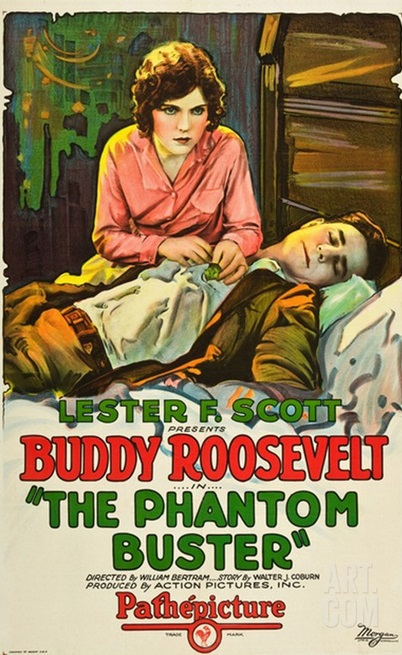
- Film poster
- Directed by: William Bertram
- Written by: Betty Burbridge; Walter J. Coburn
- Produced by: Lester F. Scott Jr.
- Starring: Buddy Roosevelt; Alma Rayford
- Distributed by: Pathé Exchange
- Release date: August 14, 1927
- Running time: 5 reels
- Country: United States
- Languages: Silent; English intertitles

The Phantom Buster is a 1927 American silent Western film directed by William Bertram starring Buddy Roosevelt and featuring Boris Karloff in a supporting role. It is considered a lost film.

== Plot ==
Bill Turner, a construction worker, steals from the corporate payroll for a gang and frames his lookalike Jeff McCloud for the crime. After Turner gets killed in an armed robbery by Jim Breed, Jeff escapes from prison and takes Turner's place in the gang, which is smuggling firearms across the Mexico–United States border. After an ambush McCloud is cared for by Babs, who was betrothed to Turner by her grandfather. Breed appears and reveals Jeff's ruse, but he and Babs are rescued by law enforcement.

== Cast ==
- Buddy Roosevelt as Jeff McCloud / Bill Turner
- Alma Rayford as Babs
- Slim Whitaker as Cassidy (as Charles Whitaker)
- Boris Karloff as Ramon
- John Junior as Jim
- Walter Maly as Jack
- Lawrence Underwood as Sheriff

== See also ==
- Boris Karloff filmography
