= The Royal Rider =

1929 film

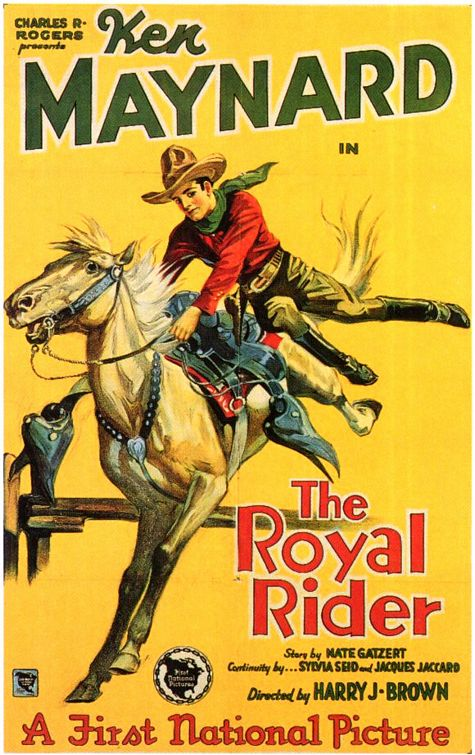
- Theatrical release poster
- Directed by: Harry Joe Brown
- Screenplay by: Sylvia Bernstein; Jacques Jaccard; Leslie Mason
- Story by: Nate Gatzert
- Produced by: Charles R. Rogers
- Starring: Ken Maynard; Olive Hasbrouck; Philippe De Lacy; Theodore Lorch; Joseph Burke; Harry Semels
- Cinematography: Ted McCord
- Edited by: Fred Allen
- Production company: First National Pictures
- Distributed by: Warner Bros. Pictures
- Release date: February 17, 1929
- Running time: 67 minutes
- Country: United States
- Languages: Sound (Synchronized); English intertitles

The Royal Rider is a 1929 American Synchronized sound Western film directed by Harry Joe Brown and written by Sylvia Bernstein, Jacques Jaccard and Leslie Mason. While the film has no audible dialog, it was released with a synchronized musical score with sound effects using the Vitaphone sound-on-disc sound process. The film stars Ken Maynard, Olive Hasbrouck, Philippe De Lacy, Theodore Lorch, Joseph Burke and Harry Semels. The film was released by Warner Bros. Pictures on February 17, 1929. The film was considered to be a lost film until March 8, 2023 when a fragment totaling 35 seconds was rediscovered.

== Plot ==
Dick Scott leads his roaming troupe of trick riders as they prepare to stage their Wild West show in a small town in Alvania, ruled by a ten-year-old Boy King, Michael XI. The young monarch's innocent curiosity is sparked when the show's advance man announces the upcoming rodeo, prompting the King to command the entire troupe to appear before him, eager to meet the legendary Texas cowboys his American governess, Ruth Elliott, has told him about.

While visiting the palace, Scott overhears the sinister Prime Minister conspiring with his political cohorts to overthrow the government and seize the throne for himself. When the Prime Minister learns that Scott knows of the plot, he devises a plan to eliminate him during a command performance of the rodeo.

The Prime Minister selected a skilled equestrian to compete against Scott in an equestrian competition intended to result in the opponent's fatality. Both riders demonstrated high-level riding skills during the contest, but Scott ultimately secured victory by lassoing and unseating his rival.

Failing to kill Scott or the Boy King, who is now heavily guarded by Scott and his troupe, the Prime Minister initiates a full-scale revolution. Scott valiantly defends the young monarch against overwhelming odds. Just when hope seems lost, Scott's faithful horse, Tarzan, arrives with the rest of the Wild West troupe to turn the tide.

The rebellion is crushed, order restored, and the grateful King gives his blessing to the budding romance between Scott and Ruth Elliott.

== Cast ==
- Ken Maynard as Dick Scott
- Olive Hasbrouck as Ruth Elliott
- Philippe De Lacy as King Michael XI
- Theodore Lorch as Prime Minister
- Joseph Burke as Kings Tutor
- Harry Semels as Parvene
- Billy Franey as Wild West Show Member
- Frank Rice as Wild West Show Member
- Bobby Dunn as Wild West Show Member
- John Sinclair as Wild West Show Member
- Ben Corbett as Wild West Show Member
- Tarzan as Tarzan

== See also ==
- List of early sound feature films (1926–1929)
