= The Cyclone Cowboy =

1927 film

- Directed by: Richard Thorpe
- Written by: Thomas J. Gray
- Produced by: Lester F. Scott Jr.
- Starring: Hal Taliaferro; Violet Bird; Raye Hampton
- Cinematography: Ray Ries
- Production company: Action Pictures
- Distributed by: Pathé Exchange
- Release date: January 16, 1927
- Country: United States
- Languages: Silent; English intertitles

The Cyclone Cowboy is a 1927 American silent Western film directed by Richard Thorpe and starring Hal Taliaferro, Violet Bird and Raye Hampton.

== Cast ==
- Hal Taliaferro as Wally Baxter
- Violet Bird as Norma
- Raye Hampton as Ma Tuttle
- Dick Lee as Gerald Weith
- Ann Warrington as Laura Tuttle
- George Magrill
