= His People =

1925 film directed by Edward Sloman

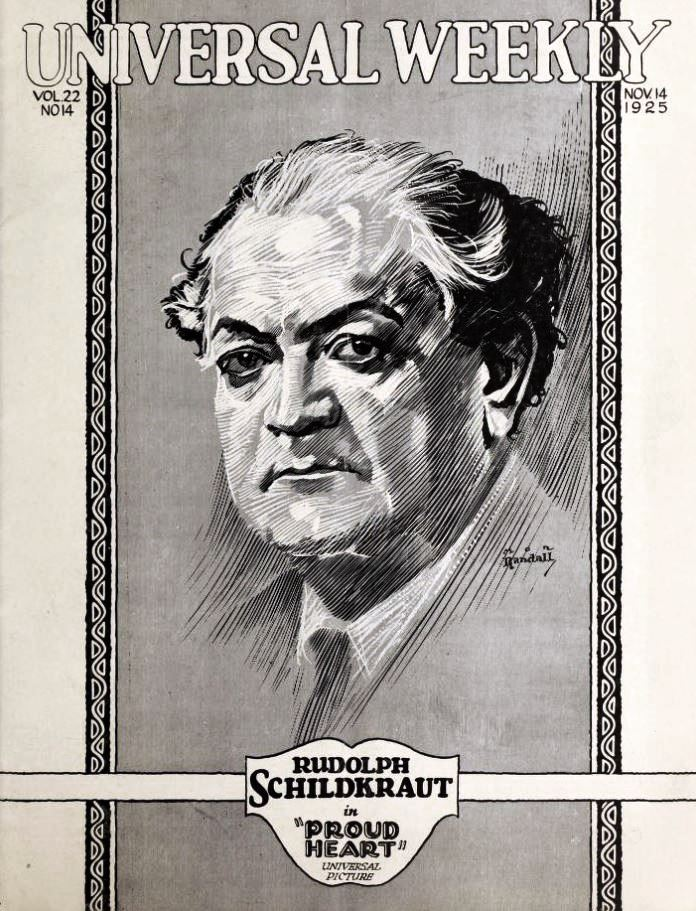
- Advertisement using the working title on Universal Weekly cover
- Directed by: Edward Sloman
- Written by: Charles E. Whittaker (scenario); Alfred A. Cohn (scenario)
- Story by: Isadore Bernstein
- Produced by: Carl Laemmle
- Starring: Rudolph Schildkraut
- Cinematography: Max Dupont
- Distributed by: Universal Pictures
- Release date: November 1, 1925
- Running time: 91 minutes (9 reels; 8,983 feet)
- Country: United States
- Language: Silent (English intertitles)
- Box office: $3,000,000

The full film

His People (also known as Proud Heart) is a 1925 American silent drama film directed by Edward Sloman about a young, Jewish boxer growing up on the Lower East Side of Manhattan. According to film historian Lester Friedman, “Sloman portrays immigrant life in America.”

== Cast ==
- Rudolph Schildkraut as David Cominsky
- Rosa Rosanova as Rose Cominsky
- Robert Gordon as Sammy Cominsky, as a Child (credited as Bobby Gordon)
- George J. Lewis as Sammy Cominsky (credited as George Lewis)
- Albert Bushaland as Morris Cominsky, as a Child
- Arthur Lubin as Morris Cominsky
- Jean Johnston as Mamie Shannon, as a Child
- Blanche Mehaffey as Mamie Shannon
- Kate Price as Kate Shannon
- Virginia Brown Faire as Ruth Stein
- Nat Carr as Chaim Barowitz
- Bertram Marburgh as Judge Nathan Stein (credited as Betram Marburgh)
- Edgar Kennedy as Thomas Nolan
- Harry Tenbrook as Mike
- Charles Sullivan as The Champion
- Sidney Franklin as Levensky
- Rolfe Sedan as Dinner Guest (uncredited)

== Score ==
In 2004, Paul Shapiro wrote a score for the film.

In 2007 Peter Rothbart, a professor of music at Ithaca College wrote a score for the film.

== Preservation ==
A print of His People is preserved at the Library of Congress.
