= Galloping On =

1925 film

- Directed by: Richard Thorpe
- Written by: Betty Burbridge; Richard Thorpe
- Produced by: Lester F. Scott Jr.
- Starring: Hal Taliaferro; Louise Lester; Slim Whitaker
- Cinematography: Ray Ries
- Production company: Action Pictures
- Distributed by: Weiss Brothers
- Release date: November 23, 1925 (U.S.)
- Running time: 55 minutes
- Country: United States
- Language: Silent (English intertitles)

Galloping On is a 1925 American silent Western film directed by Richard Thorpe and starring Hal Taliaferro, Louise Lester, and Slim Whitaker. It was produced by the independent company Action Pictures. Location shooting took place around Julian, California.

== Plot ==
As described in a film magazine review, the unjustly convicted Wally Moore returns to his hometown after his prison release to find that his mother's ranch has been seized for an unpaid mortgage by the banker Brown. Jack Bowers persists in annoying Helen Jenkins through his unwanted attentions and Wally intervenes, fights with Jack, and is arrested again. Meanwhile, Bowers and his gang rob the bank. Wally is released, goes after the crooks and catches them, and recovers the stolen loot. He obtains a reward, has his name cleared, and wins the affections of Helen.

== Cast ==
- Hal Taliaferro as Wally Moore
- Jessie Cruzon as Helen Jenkins
- Louise Lester as Mrs. Moore - Wally's Mother
- Slim Whitaker as Jack Bowers
- Richard Belfield as Banker Brown
- Lawrence Underwood as Sheriff Jenkins
- Buck Bucko as Townsman
- Roy Bucko as Rancher
- Jim Corey as Henchman
- Art Phillips as Storekeeper
- Bud Pope as Deputy
- Gretchen Waterman as Banker Brown's Young Daughter

== Preservation ==
A print of Galloping On exists and the film has been released on DVD.

== Bibliography ==
- Connelly, Robert B. The Silents: Silent Feature Films, 1910-36, Volume 40, Issue 2. December Press, 1998.
- Munden, Kenneth White. The American Film Institute Catalog of Motion Pictures Produced in the United States, Part 1. University of California Press, 1997.
