= The Shamrock and the Rose =

1927 film

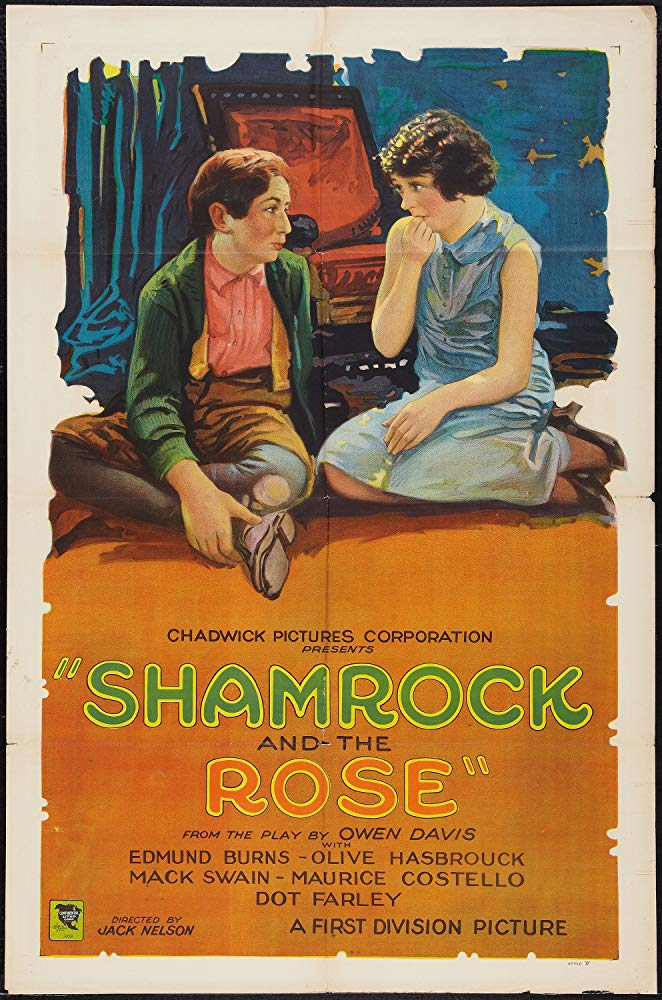
- Theatrical release poster
- Directed by: Jack Nelson
- Written by: Isadore Bernstein; James Madison
- Based on: The Shamrock and the Rose by Owen Davis
- Starring: Mack Swain; Olive Hasbrouck; Edmund Burns
- Cinematography: Ernest Miller
- Production company: Chadwick Pictures
- Distributed by: Chadwick Pictures; Butcher's Film Service (UK)
- Release date: April 15, 1927
- Running time: 70 minutes
- Country: United States
- Language: Silent (English intertitles)

The Shamrock and the Rose is a 1927 American silent comedy film directed by Jack Nelson and starring Mack Swain, Olive Hasbrouck, and Edmund Burns.

It was one of a series of film presenting inter-community romance between Irish Americans and Jewish Americans.

== Plot ==
On the East Side of New York City, feuding families the Cohens and the Kellys own an ice cream and a hot dog stand respectively, but their children have fallen in love.

== Cast ==
- Mack Swain as Mr. Kelly
- Olive Hasbrouck as Rosie Cohen
- Edmund Burns as Tom Kelly
- Maurice Costello as Father O'Brien
- William H. Strauss as Mr. Cohen
- Dot Farley as Mrs. Kelly
- Rosa Rosanova as Mrs. Cohen
- Leon Holmes as Sammy Cohen
- Otto Lederer as Rabbi Naser
- Coy Watson as Mickey Kelly

== Bibliography ==
- Ruth Barton. Irish National Cinema. Routledge, 2004. ISBN 0-415-27895-3
- Donald W. McCaffrey & Christopher P. Jacobs. Guide to the Silent Years of American Cinema. Greenwood Publishing, 1999. ISBN 0-313-30345-2
