= Charles K. French =

American actor (1860–1952)

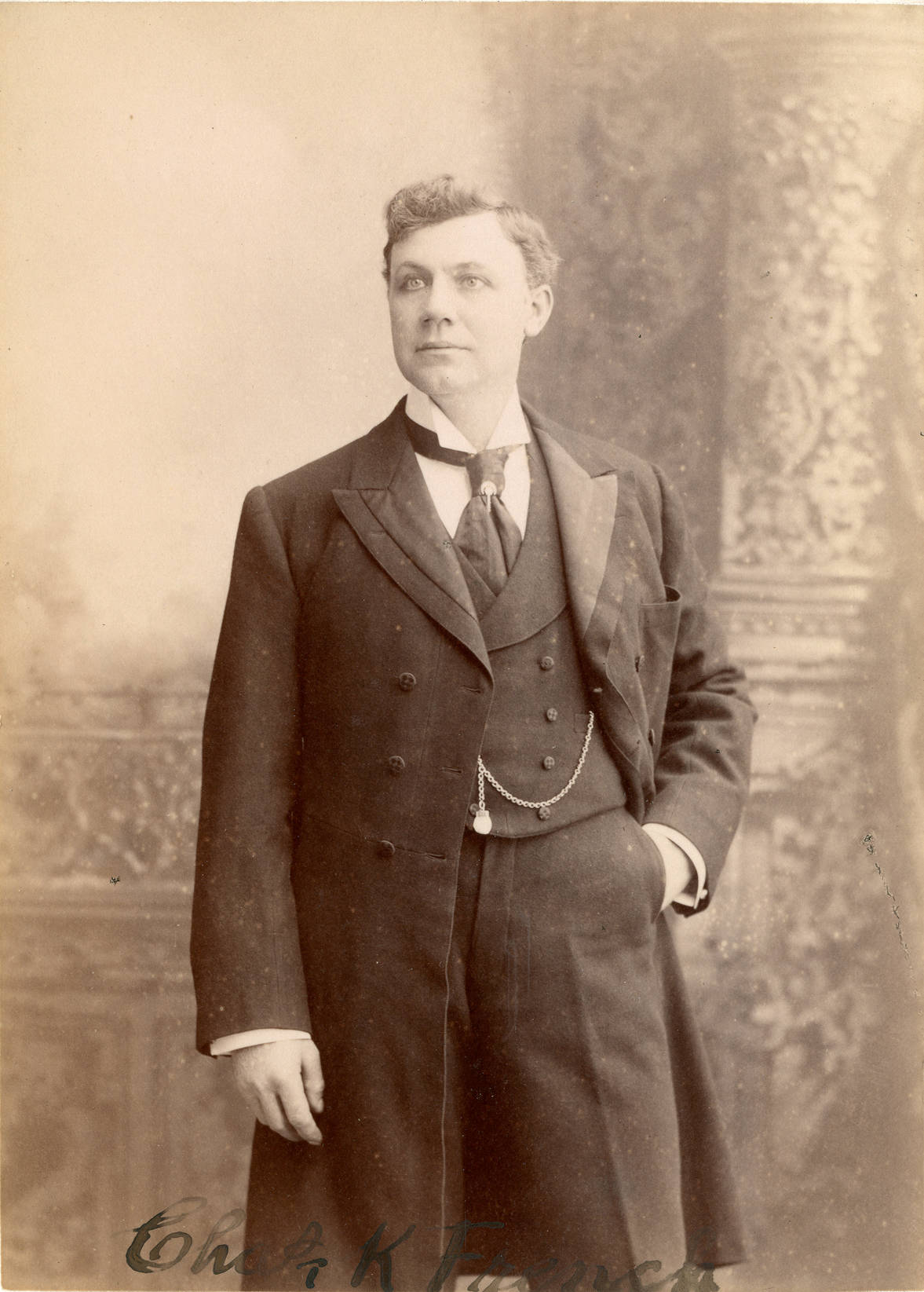
- French in 1904
- Born: Charles Ekrauss French; January 17, 1860; Columbus, Ohio, U.S.
- Died: August 2, 1952 (aged 92)
- Occupations: Actor, screenwriter, director
- Years active: 1909–1945
- Spouse: Isabelle Gurton (m. 1919–1928)

Charles K. French (born Charles Ekrauss French or Charles E. Krauss; January 17, 1860 – August 2, 1952 ) was an American film actor, screenwriter and director who appeared in more than 240 films between 1909 and 1945.

== Biography ==
French was born in Columbus, Ohio, and graduated from Columbus High School. He married Isabelle Gurton.

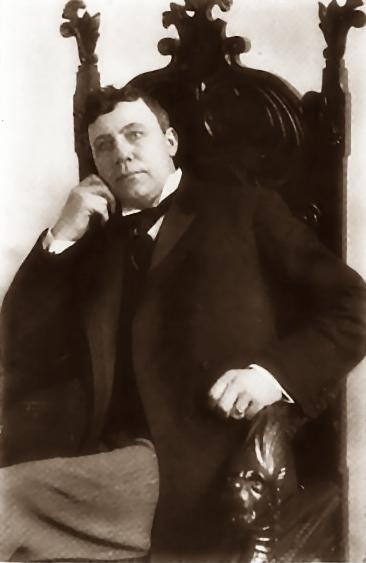
Who's Who in the Film World, 1914

French's film debut came in Davey Crockett (1906).

== Selected filmography ==
=== Actor ===
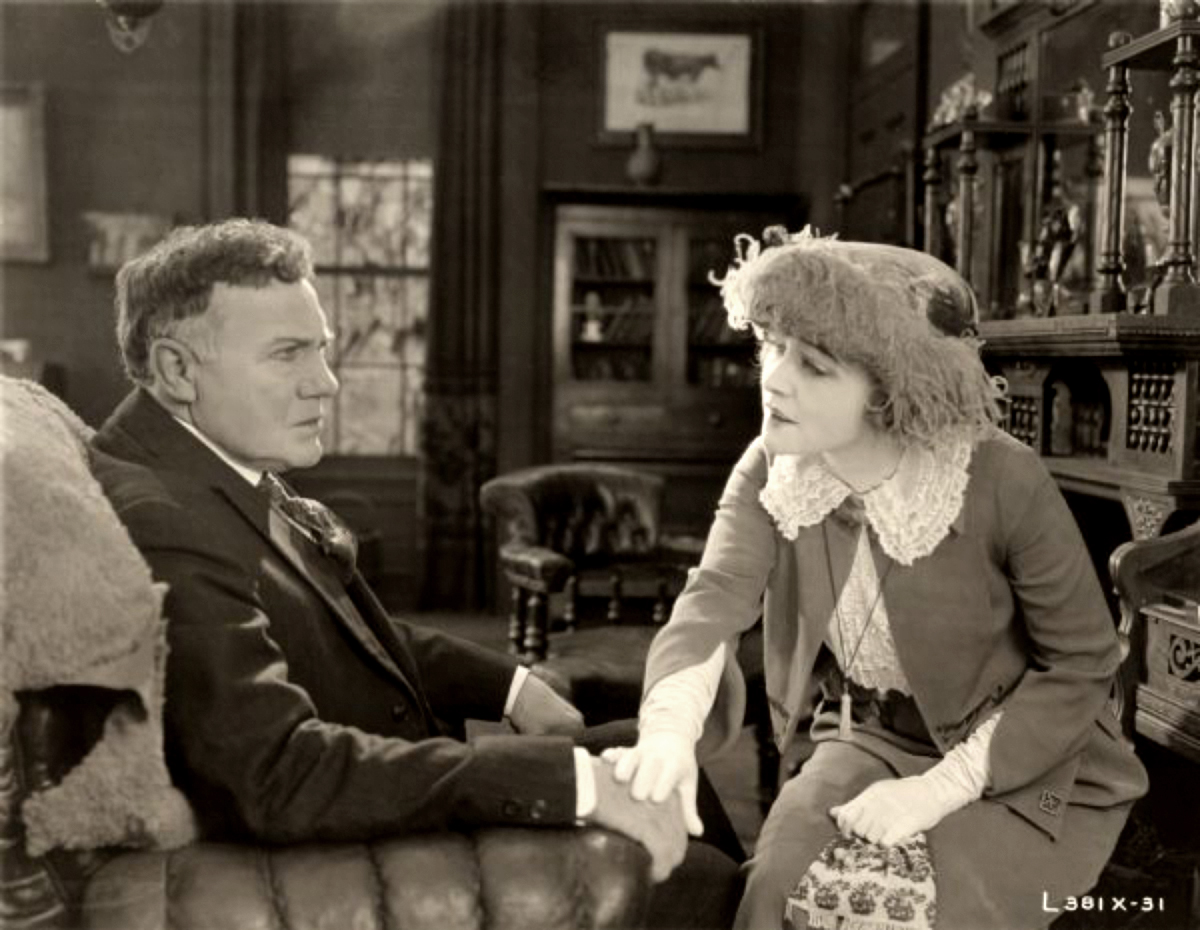
French with Ethel Clayton in a still from the drama Beyond, 1921

- The Cord of Life (1909, Short)
- Davy Crockett – In Hearts United (1909, Short) - Davy Crockett
- Custer's Last Fight (1912, Short)
- The Vengeance of Fate (1912)
- The Paymaster's Son (1913)
- The Battle of Gettysburg (1913)
- The Aryan (1916)
- The Vagabond Prince (1916)
- The Bugler of Algiers (1916)
- An Even Break (1917)
- Paws of the Bear (1917)
- The Clodhopper (1917)
- Wee Lady Betty (1917)
- Love or Justice (1917)
- The Weaker Sex (1917)
- The Guilty Man (1918)
- A Burglar for a Night (1918)
- The Marriage Ring (1918)
- Fuss and Feathers (1918)
- Three X Gordon (1918)
- Come Again Smith (1919)
- This Hero Stuff (1919)
- Six Feet Four (1919)
- The Speed Maniac (1919)
- Haunting Shadows (1919)
- What Every Woman Wants (1919)
- Happy Though Married (1919)
- Stronger Than Death (1920)
- The Terror (1920)
- The Texan (1920)
- Prairie Trails (1920)
- Hands Off! (1921)
- The Night Horsemen (1921)
- The Last Trail (1921)
- Beyond (1921)
- Bare Knuckles (1921)
- The Bearcat (1922)
- The Yosemite Trail (1922)
- West of Chicago (1922)
- Smudge (1922)
- The Woman He Loved (1922)
- Mixed Faces (1922)
- Grumpy (1923)
- The Lonely Road (1923)
- Blinky (1923)
- A Woman of Paris (1923)
- Man's Size (1923)
- The Abysmal Brute (1923)
- The Ramblin' Kid (1923)
- The Extra Girl (1923)
- Gentle Julia (1923)
- The Dramatic Life of Abraham Lincoln (1924)
- Oh, You Tony! (1924)
- The Sawdust Trail (1924)
- The Torrent (1924)
- The Girl of Gold (1925)
- The Saddle Hawk (1925)
- Speed Mad (1925)
- Let 'er Buck (1925)
- The Way of a Girl (1925)
- Too Much Youth (1925)
- The Texas Trail (1925)
- A Woman of the Sea (1926)
- Frenzied Flames (1926)
- The Hollywood Reporter (1926)
- Oh, What a Night! (1926)
- The Runaway Express (1926)
- The Winning Wallop (1926)
- Under Western Skies (1926)
- Hands Up! (1926)
- The Flaming Frontier (1926)
- War Paint (1926)
- The Meddlin' Stranger (1927)
- One Chance in a Million (1927)
- The Down Grade (1927)
- The Adventurous Soul (1927)
- Ride 'em High (1927)
- The Cruise of the Hellion (1927)
- Fast and Furious (1927)
- Man, Woman and Sin (1927)
- The Charge of the Gauchos (1928)
- The Big Hop (1928)
- The Cowboy Cavalier (1928)
- Riding for Fame (1928)
- The Flyin' Buckaroo (1928)
- Overland Bound (1929)
- Wings of Adventure (1930)
- Man of Action (1933)
- Via Pony Express (1933)
- War of the Range (1933)
- Cross Fire (1933)
- The Man from Hell (1934)
- The Brand of Hate (1934)
- Trail of Terror (1935)
- Murder by Television (1935)
- Gun Play (1935)
- Western Courage (1935)
- The Phantom Empire (1935)
- Desert Guns (1936)
- Where Trails Divide (1937)

=== Director ===
- Romance of a Fishermaid (1909)
- Charmed, I'm Sure (1909)
- Thoughts of Tonight (1915)

=== Writer ===
- Romance of a Fishermaid (1909)
- Davy Crockett – In Hearts United (1909)
