= Desperate Courage =

1928 film

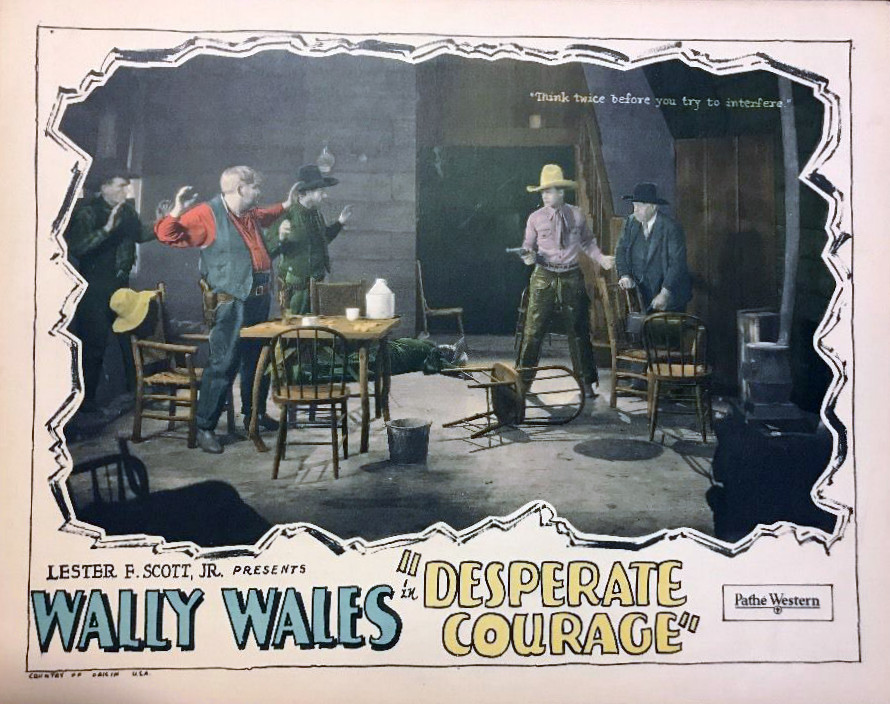
- Lobby card
- Directed by: Richard Thorpe
- Written by: Grant Taylor; Frank L. Inghram
- Starring: Wally Wales; Olive Hasbrouck; Tom Bay
- Cinematography: Ray Ries
- Production company: Action Pictures
- Distributed by: Pathé Exchange
- Release date: January 15, 1928 (US)
- Running time: 5 reels
- Country: United States
- Languages: Silent; English intertitles

Desperate Courage is a 1928 American silent Western film directed by Richard Thorpe. The film stars Wally Wales, Olive Hasbrouck, and Tom Bay. Produced by the Poverty Row studio Action Pictures, it was released by Pathé Exchange on January 15, 1928.

== Cast ==
- Wally Wales as Jim Dane
- Olive Hasbrouck as Ann Halliday
- Tom Bay as Colonel Halliday
- Lafe McKee as A Brannon Brother
- Fanchon Frankel as A Brannon Brother
- Bill Dyer as A Brannon Brother
- Slim Whitaker as Henchman (credited as Charles Whitaker)
- Al Taylor as Henchman
- S. S. Simon as Sheriff

== Reception ==
The Palladium-Item gave the picture a good review, calling it "a thrilling western drama of the brave for the brave and fair," which had "more than the usual amount of dramatic action." The Film Daily also gave it a warm review, stating that there was plenty of good action in the film.
