= Ray Ries =

American cinematographer

- Born: May 7, 1894; Ohio, United States
- Died: August 23, 1977 (aged 83); Los Angeles, California, United States
- Occupation: Cinematographer
- Years active: 1915–1929 (film)

Ray Ries (1894–1977) was an American cinematographer active during the silent era. He was employed by independent studio Action Pictures on a number of westerns, frequently collaborating with director Richard Thorpe.

== Selected filmography ==
- Thundering Romance (1924)
- Fast Fightin' (1925)
- Reckless Courage (1925)
- On the Go (1925)
- Double Action Daniels (1925)
- The Desert Demon (1925)
- The Saddle Cyclone (1925)
- Galloping On (1925)
- The Bonanza Buckaroo (1926)
- Ace of Action (1926)
- The Ramblin' Galoot (1926)
- Twisted Triggers (1926)
- The Interferin' Gent (1927)
- The Obligin' Buckaroo (1927)
- White Pebbles (1927)
- The Soda Water Cowboy (1927)
- The Meddlin' Stranger (1927)
- The Fightin' Comeback (1927)
- The Cyclone Cowboy (1927)
- The Desert of the Lost (1927)
- Ride 'em High (1927)
- Code of the Cow Country (1927)
- Roarin' Broncs (1927)
- Skedaddle Gold (1927)
- The Galloping Gobs (1927)
- Pals in Peril (1927)
- Tearin' Into Trouble (1927)
- The Ridin' Rowdy (1927)
- Saddle Mates (1928)
- Desperate Courage (1928)
- The Flyin' Buckaroo (1928)
- The Ballyhoo Buster (1928)
- The Valley of Hunted Men (1928)
- The Cowboy Cavalier (1928)
- The King of the Kongo (1929)
- Dark Skies (1929)

== Bibliography ==
- Munden, Kenneth White. The American Film Institute Catalog of Motion Pictures Produced in the United States, Part 1. University of California Press, 1997.
