= George Magrill =

American actor (1900–1952)

- Born: January 5, 1900; Brooklyn, New York, U.S.
- Died: May 31, 1952 (aged 52); Los Angeles, California, U.S.
- Occupation: Actor
- Years active: 1923-1952

George Magrill (January 5, 1900 – May 31, 1952) was an American film actor who appeared in more than 320 films between 1923 and 1952.

Magrill performed on stage before he began to work in films. Besides his acting, Magrill worked as a stunt man in films. He also served in the Navy and became a lightweight boxing champion in that service branch.

Magrill was born in Brooklyn, New York, was married to Ramona Oliver, and had a daughter named Marilynn. On May 31, 1952, Magrill died in Los Angeles, California.

== Partial filmography ==
- The Eagle's Talons (1923)
- North of Nevada (1924)
- The Mask of Lopez (1924)
- Stolen Secrets (1924)
- Duped (1925)
- Wild Horse Mesa (1925) – Bert Manerube
- Lord Jim (1925)
- The Enchanted Hill (1926)
- The Windjammer (1926)
- Snowed In (1926)
- The Cyclone Cowboy (1927)
- Roarin' Broncs (1927)
- Ride 'em High (1927)
- The Desert of the Lost (1927)
- Hawk of the Hills (1927, Serial)
- The Ballyhoo Buster (1928)
- Vultures of the Sea (1928)
- Queen of the Northwoods (1929)
- The Galloping Ghost (1931)
- The Lost Special (1932)
- The Last Man (1932)
- The Mystery Squadron (1933)
- King Kong (1933) – Member of Ship's Crew (uncredited)
- The Girl from Missouri (1934)
- The Merry Widow (1934)
- The Phantom Empire (1935)
- Three Little Beers (1935) – Traffic policeman (uncredited)
- San Francisco (1936)
- Flash Gordon (1936, Serial) – Ming's Soldier (uncredited)
- Fugitive in the Sky (1936) Unbilled
- Secret Agent X-9 (1937)
- Night Key (1937)
- Shall We Dance (1937)
- The Great Waltz (1938)
- The Mad Miss Manton (1938)
- Dick Tracy Returns (1938)
- The Lone Ranger (1938, Serial)
- Penitentiary (1938)
- Union Pacific (1939)
- The Flying Irishman (1939)
- The Phantom Creeps (1939)
- New Moon (1940)
- A Chump at Oxford (1940)
- The Secret Seven (1940)
- Swanee River (1940)
- Love Crazy (1941)
- The Sea Wolf (1941)
- Buck Privates (1941)
- The Spider Returns (1941)
- Tarzan's New York Adventure (1942)
- A Yank on the Burma Road (1942)
- Tortilla Flat (1942)
- Wake Island (1942)
- Reap the Wild Wind (1942)
- Captain Midnight (1942)
- Secret Service in Darkest Africa (1943)
- Batman (1943)
- Cobra Woman (1944)
- The Fighting Seabees (1944)
- Captain America (1944, Serial)
- They Were Expendable (1945)
- Dick Tracy (1945)
- Yolanda and the Thief (1945)
- The Crimson Ghost (1946)
- The Jolson Story (1946)
- Daughter of Don Q (1946)
- The Mysterious Mr. M (1946)
- Merton of the Movies (1947)
- Nightmare Alley (1947)
- Unconquered (1947)
- Body and Soul (1947)
- The Secret Life of Walter Mitty (1947)
- The Sea of Grass (1947)
- Lady in the Lake (1947)
- Force of Evil (1948)
- Joan of Arc (1948)
- G-Men Never Forget (1948)
- Arch of Triumph (1948)
- Superman (1948, Serial)
- Adam's Rib (1949)
- Samson and Delilah (1949)
- Tulsa (1949)
- Trapped (1949)
- Three Little Words (1950)
- The Invisible Monster (1950)
- Tarzan and the Slave Girl (1950)
- Angels in the Outfield (1951)
- I Was a Communist for the FBI (1951)
- Red Planet Mars (1952)
- Denver and Rio Grande (1952)
- The War of the Worlds (1953)
