= Rosa Rosanova =

Russian-American actress (1869–1944)

- Роза Розанова
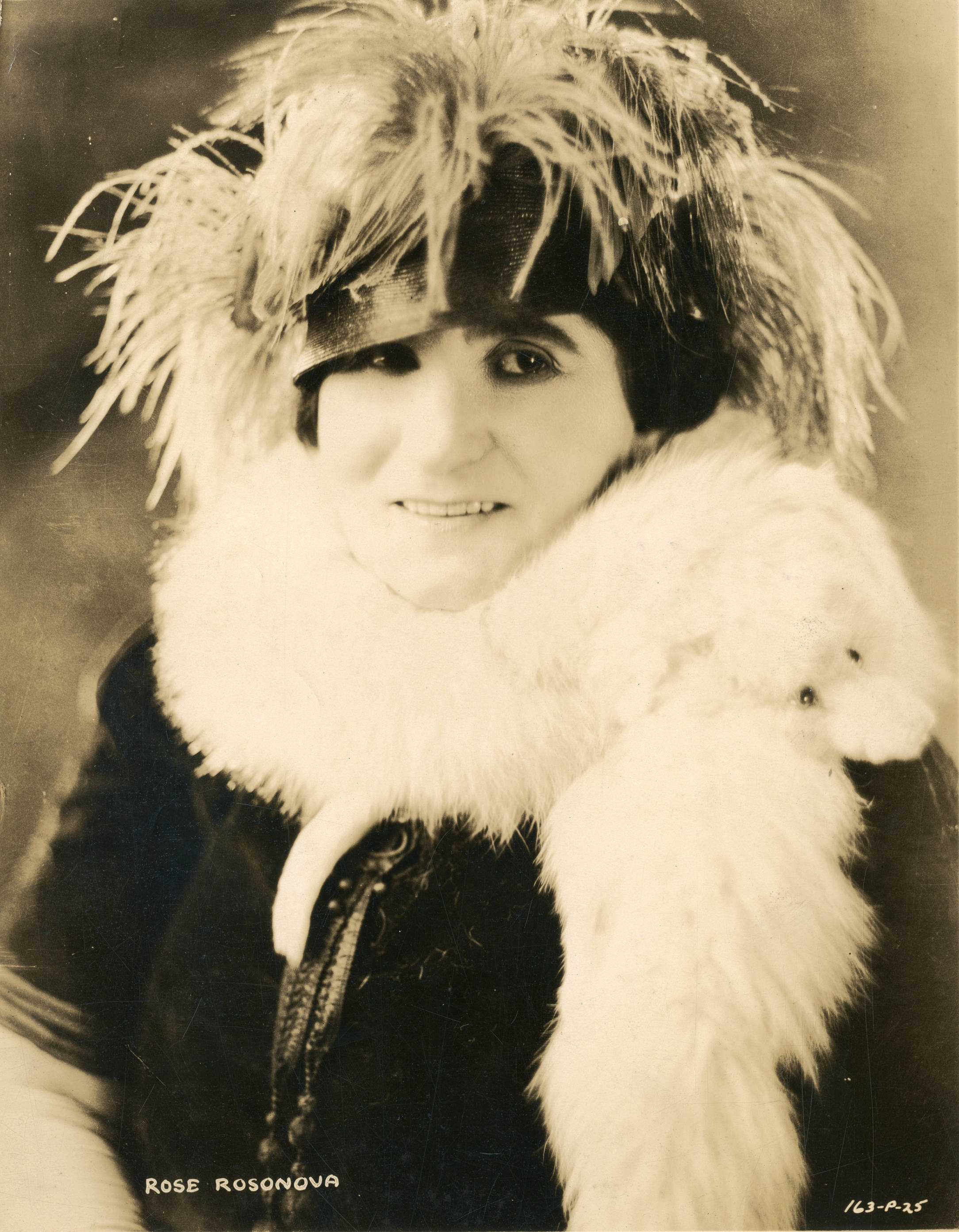
- Rosonova in 1923
- Born: June 23, 1869; Odessa, Kherson Governorate, Russian Empire (now Ukraine)
- Died: May 29, 1944 (aged 74); Santa Monica, California, U.S.
- Resting place: Hollywood Forever Cemetery, Los Angeles, California, U.S.
- Occupation: Actress
- Years active: 1906–1934

Rosa Rosanova (Russian: Роза Розанова; June 23, 1869 – May 29, 1944) was a Russian-born stage and film actress. She appeared in American films including as a starring or supporting actress in the 1920s and 1930s

== Biography ==
Born in Russia, Rosanova completed her schooling at age 16 in Moscow. As an actress, she toured with the Svatloff repertory company in Russia, and in 1906 travelled to the United States touring with the Orlanoff company. She immigrated to the United States some time before the Russian Revolution.

Like Vera Gordon, Rosanova frequently portrayed Jewish mothers in early American silent films. Rosanova starred as such a character in Hungry Hearts (1922), His People (1925) and Lucky Boy (1929). In a 1929 profile, the Santa Ana Register described Rosanova's performance in Hungry Hearts as "a powerful characterization that was the outstanding performance of filmdom."

In her book You Never Call! You Never Write!: A History of the Jewish Mother, Joyce Antler described Rosanova as a "a Yiddish star.

== Select filmography ==
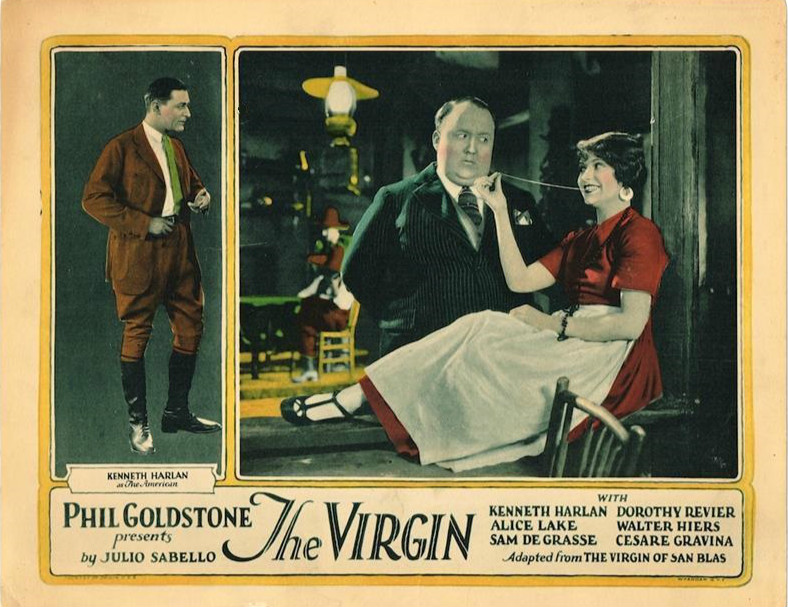

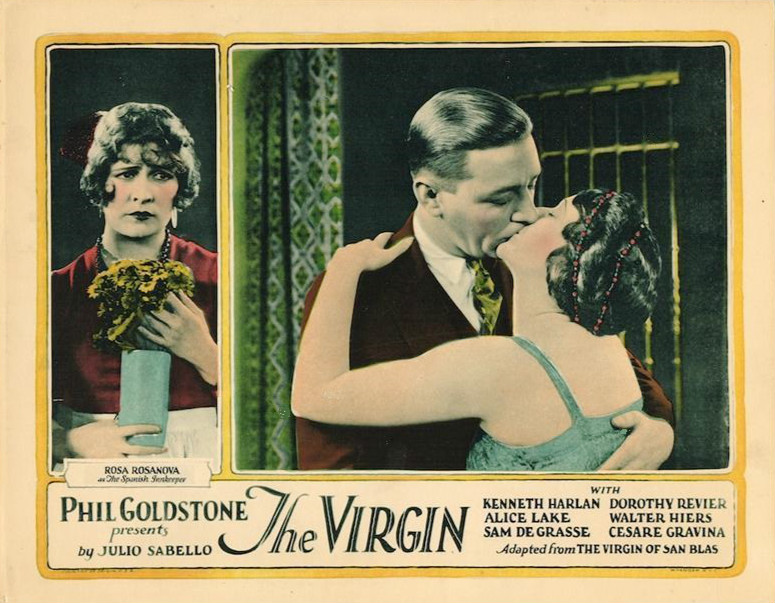

- Just Around the Corner (1921) as Mrs. Finshreiber
- Hungry Hearts (1922)
- Blood and Sand (1922) as Señora Angustias
- The Wandering Jew (1923)
- Fashion Row (1923) as Mama Levitzky
- The Gentleman from America (1923) as Old Inez
- The Lover of Camille (1924) as Madame Rabouir
- The Virgin (1924) as The Widow Montez
- When a Girl Loves (1924) as Ferdova
- A Woman's Faith (1925) as Delima Turcott
- His People (1925)
- God Gave Me Twenty Cents (1926)
- Jake the Plumber (1927) as Mrs. Levine
- Pleasure Before Business (1927) as Sarah Weinberg
- The Shamrock and the Rose (1927) as Mrs. Cohen
- Abie's Irish Rose (1928) as Sarah
- The Younger Generation (1929) as Tilda (Ma) Goldfish
- Lucky Boy (1929) as Mamma Jessel
- After Tomorrow (1932)
- Pilgrimage (1933)
- Fighting Hero (1934) as Aunt J
