= The Ridin' Rascal =

1926 film

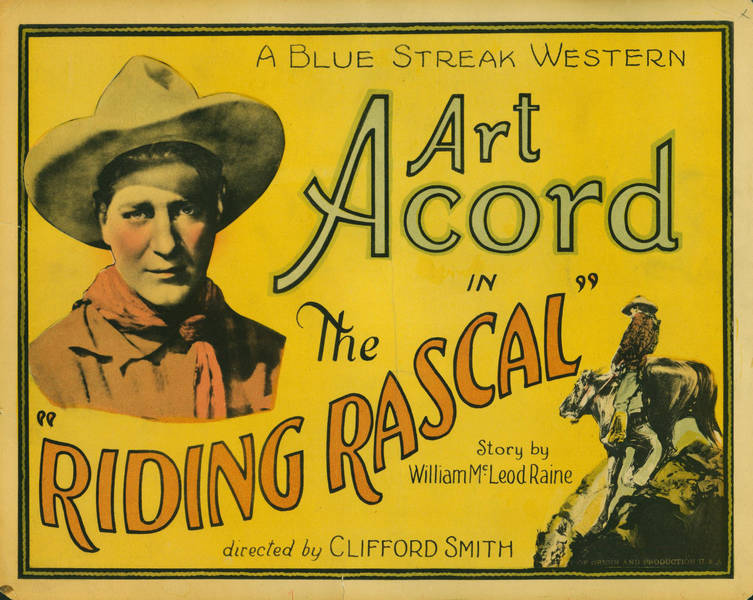
- Directed by: Clifford Smith
- Written by: Harrison Jacobs (scenario); Isadore Bernstein (adaptation)
- Based on: Mavericks by William MacLeod Raine
- Produced by: Carl Laemmle
- Starring: Art Acord; Olive Hasbrouck; Buck Connors
- Cinematography: Edward Linden
- Production company: Universal Pictures
- Distributed by: Universal Pictures
- Release date: September 19, 1926
- Running time: 5 reels
- Country: United States
- Language: Silent (English intertitles)

The Ridin' Rascal is a 1926 American silent Western film directed by Clifford Smith based upon the novel Mavericks by William MacLeod Raine. The film stars Art Acord, Olive Hasbrouck, and Buck Connors.

== Plot ==
As described in a film magazine, Larrabie Keller comes into cow country as a homesteader and is immediately attacked by the cattlemen who accuse him of being a rustler. The insults of Bill Healy cause Keller to give him a severe drubbing after Keller's refusal to fight Phil Sanderson, whose sister Phyllis has struck his fancy. Later Phyllis finds Keller beside a branding fire which he is investigating and believes him guilty of rustling. Healy fires and wounds Keller. Phyllis, unknown to Healy, takes Keller to Yeager, another homesteader, who dresses Keller's wounds. Phil and Healy follow them to Yeager's, but are mislead by Phyllis, who finds a strange attraction in the suspected rustler. After she leaves, Yeager accuses Keller, who is forced to take Yeager into his confidence and prove to him that he is really a Texas Ranger. When he goes back to town, Keller is arrested. The real rustlers try to place all the blame on Keller, but Phyllis frees him from the jail by a ruse. With the rustlers planning a final round-up that night, Keller rides to the scene while the rustlers lead a posse after him. When they catch him, Keller and Healy engage in a fierce fight on a cliff which ends in Healy's plunge to his death. Phil, the brother of Phyllis, helps Keller round up the rustlers and is forgiven, while Phyllis finds her faith in Keller vindicated.

== Cast ==
- Art Acord as Larrabie Keller
- Olive Hasbrouck as Phyllis Sanderson
- Blackie Thompson as Phillip Sanderson (credited as Clarence Thompson)
- William Steele as Bill Healy (credited as W. A. Steele)
- S. E. Jennings as Buck Weaver
- Buck Connors as Yeager (credited as George Connors)
- Syd Saylor as Slim (credited as Leo Sailor)
- Dudley Hendricks as Jim Sanderson
- C. E. Anderson

== Preservation ==
With no prints of The Ridin' Rascal located in any film archives, it is a lost film.

== Bibliography ==
- Munden, Kenneth White. The American Film Institute Catalog of Motion Pictures Produced in the United States, Part 1. University of California Press, 1997.
