= White Pebbles =

1927 film

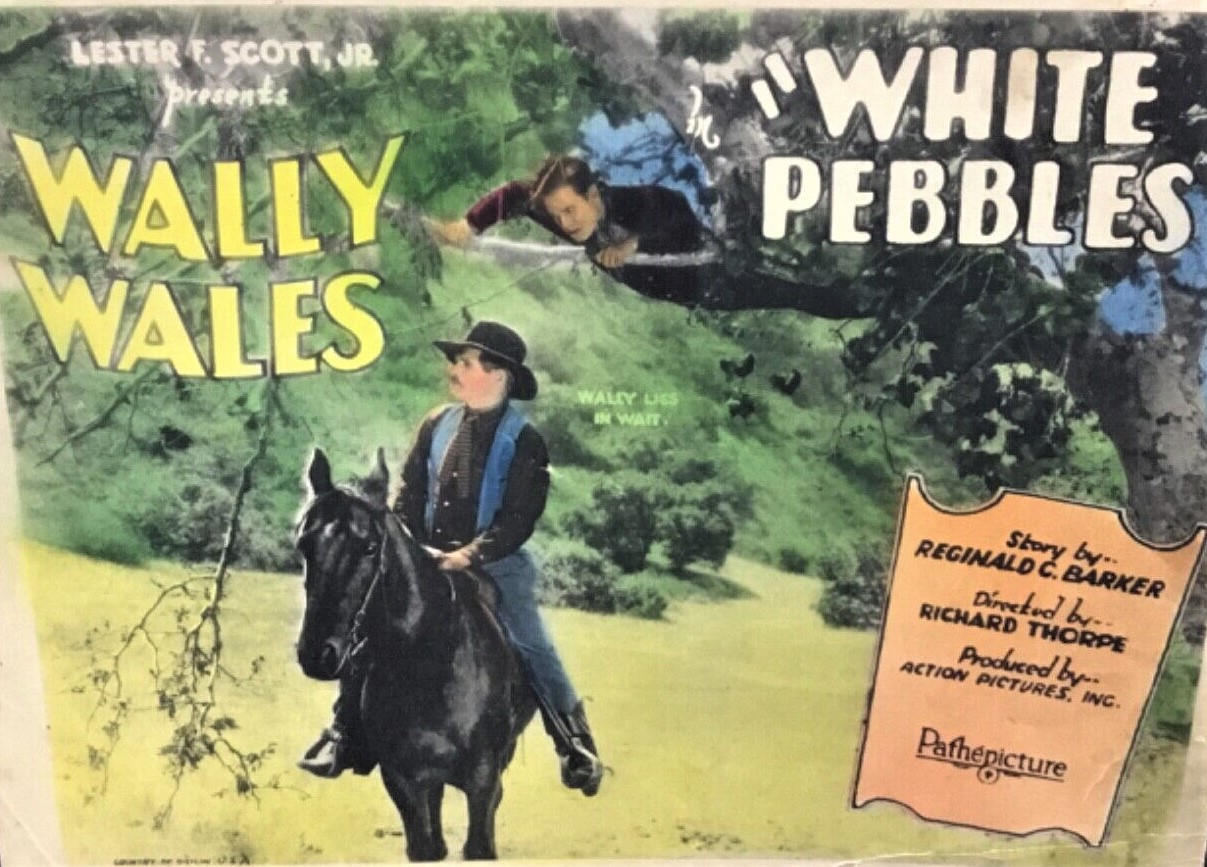
- Directed by: Richard Thorpe
- Written by: Reginald Barker; Betty Burbridge
- Produced by: Lester F. Scott Jr.
- Starring: Hal Taliaferro; Olive Hasbrouck; Walter Maly
- Cinematography: Ray Ries
- Production company: Action Pictures
- Distributed by: Pathé Exchange
- Release date: August 7, 1927
- Running time: 50 minutes
- Country: United States
- Languages: Silent; English intertitles

White Pebbles is a 1927 American silent Western film directed by Richard Thorpe and starring Hal Taliaferro, Olive Hasbrouck and Walter Maly.

== Cast ==
- Hal Taliaferro as Zip Wallace
- Olive Hasbrouck as Bess Allison
- Walter Maly as Sam Harvey
- Tom Bay as Happy Bill
- Harry Todd as Tim

== Bibliography ==
- James Robert Parish & Michael R. Pitts. Film directors: a guide to their American films. Scarecrow Press, 1974.
