= Rustlers' Ranch =

1926 film

- Directed by: Clifford Smith
- Written by: Harrison Jacobs; Richard Schayer; W.C. Tuttle
- Produced by: Carl Laemmle
- Starring: Art Acord; Olive Hasbrouck; Duke R. Lee
- Cinematography: Edward Linden
- Production company: Universal Pictures
- Distributed by: Universal Pictures
- Release date: April 11, 1926
- Country: United States
- Languages: Silent; English intertitles

Rustlers' Ranch is a 1926 American silent Western film directed by Clifford Smith and starring Art Acord, Olive Hasbrouck and Duke R. Lee.

== Plot ==
Lee Crush, an unemployed cowboy, engages in a brawl with Bull Dozier, causing him to fall through a railing. Believing he has fatally injured Bull, Lee flees and secures employment at the Shawn ranch. There, he intervenes to prevent Clem Allen from defrauding Widow Shawn and develops romantic feelings for her daughter, Mary. Following Clem's arrest, the sheriff informs Lee that Bull Dozier survived the fall. Eventually, Lee and Mary marry.

== Cast ==
- Art Acord as Lee Crush
- Olive Hasbrouck as Lois Shawn
- Duke R. Lee as Boggs
- George Chesebro as Bud Harvey
- Edith Yorke as Mary Shawn
- Matty Kemp as Clem Allen
- Stanton Heck as Bull Dozier
- Lillian Worth as Tessie
- Ned Bassett as Sheriff Collins

== Bibliography ==
- Munden, Kenneth White. The American Film Institute Catalog of Motion Pictures Produced in the United States, Part 1. University of California Press, 1997.
