= The Virgin (film) =

1924 film

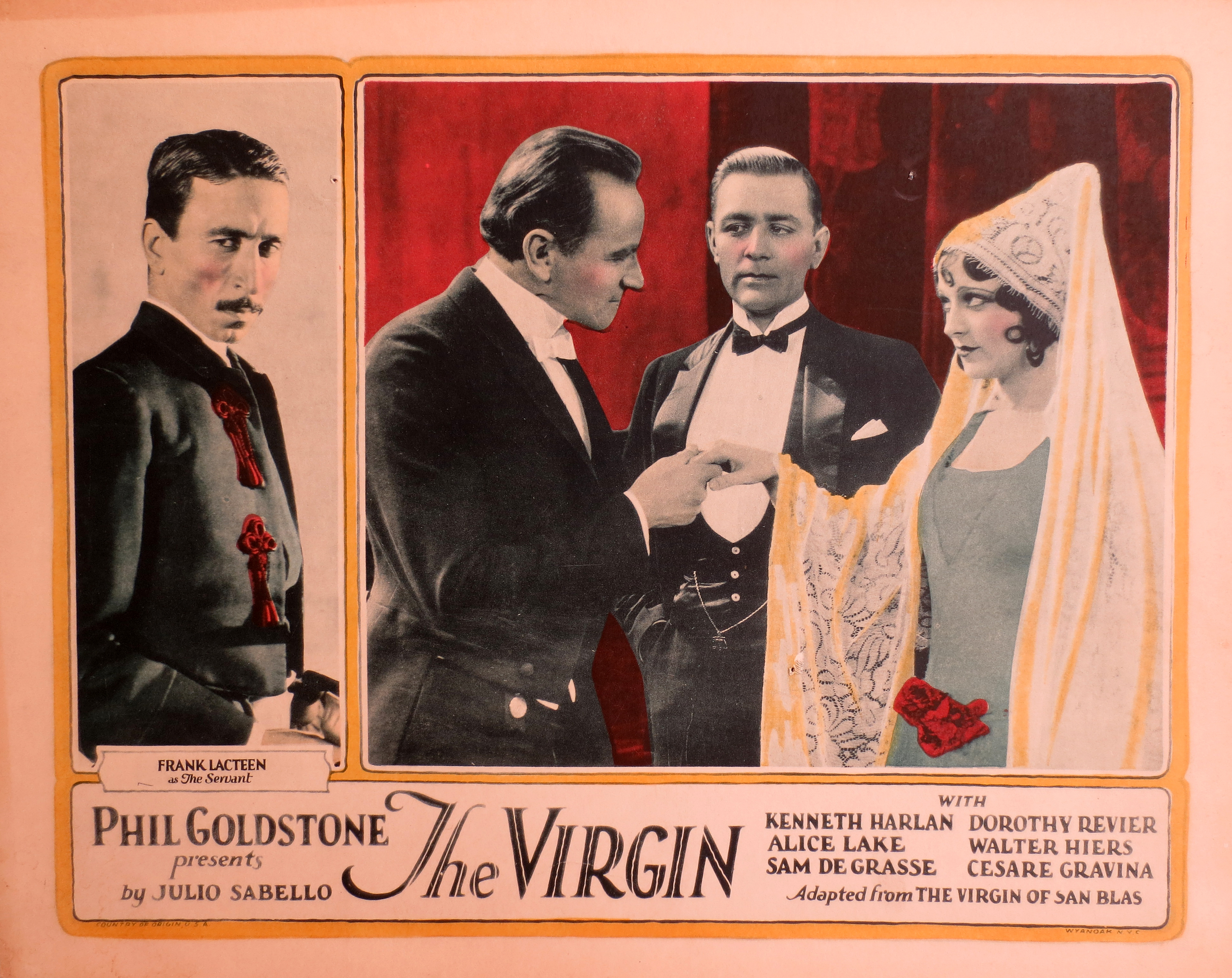
- Directed by: Alan James
- Written by: Jack Natteford
- Based on: The Virgin of San Blas by Julio Sabello
- Produced by: Phil Goldstone
- Starring: Kenneth Harlan; Dorothy Revier; Sam De Grasse
- Cinematography: Edgar Lyons
- Production company: Phil Goldstone Productions
- Distributed by: Truart Film Corporation
- Release date: August 1, 1924
- Running time: 60 minutes
- Country: United States
- Language: Silent (English intertitles)

The Virgin is a 1924 American independent silent drama film directed by Alan James and starring Kenneth Harlan, Dorothy Revier, and Sam De Grasse. It is inspired by the poem The Virgin of San Blas by Julio Sabello.

== Cast ==
- Kenneth Harlan as David Kent
- Dorothy Revier as Maía Valdez
- Sam De Grasse as Ricardo Ruiz
- Frank Lackteen as Ricardo's Valet
- Rosa Rosanova as The Widow Montez
- Alice Lake as Rosa Montez
- Walter Hiers as Sam Hawkins
- Nell Clark Keller as The Duenna
- Lois Scott as The Maid
- J.P. Lockney as Major-domo
- Cesare Gravina as The Money Lender

== Bibliography ==
- Munden, Kenneth White. The American Film Institute Catalog of Motion Pictures Produced in the United States, Part 1. University of California Press, 1997.
