= Charmed, I'm Sure =

1909 film by Charles K. French

Charmed, I'm Sure is a 1909 American silent comedy film directed by Charles K. French. The director chose to cast unknowns after a dispute over salaries caused most of the cast to walk out on the first day of shooting. Because of the short time-frame the director had to work with, French decided to cast members of the technical crew in main roles, although none of the crew went on to act in any other films.

== Plot ==
The story involves a bank robber, Daniel, who falls in love at first sight with Jane, the bank teller he has taken hostage in a robbery gone awry. Comic antics ensue as the robber simultaneously attempts to win the teller's affections and escape the building surrounded by policemen.

== Status ==
Two days before the film was to be completed, a fire destroyed the film negatives, which caused the studio to abandon the film. Today, the film is presumed lost; all that survives of the film is a partial script which turned up at a Los Angeles auction house.
