= Montmartre Rose =

1929 film directed by Bernard McEveety

- Directed by: Bernard McEveety
- Written by: Isadore Bernstein; Sylvia Bernstein; Jacques Jaccard; Adeline Hendricks
- Produced by: Samuel Zierler
- Starring: Marguerite De La Motte; Rosemary Theby; Harry Myers
- Cinematography: Walter Haas; William Miller
- Edited by: Betty Davis
- Production company: Excellent Pictures
- Distributed by: Excellent Pictures
- Release date: April 1, 1929
- Running time: 62 minutes
- Country: United States
- Languages: Silent; English intertitles

Montmartre Rose is a 1929 American silent drama film directed by Bernard McEveety and starring Marguerite De La Motte, Rosemary Theby and Harry Myers.

== Plot ==
A Paris jeweller becomes engaged to a performer of the Montmartre cafes.

== Cast ==
- Marguerite De La Motte as Jeanne
- Rosemary Theby
- Harry Myers
- Paul Ralli
- Frank Leigh
- Martha Mattox

== Bibliography ==
- Munden, Kenneth White. The American Film Institute Catalog of Motion Pictures Produced in the United States, Part 1. University of California Press, 1997.
