= The Fighting Three =

1927 film directed by Albert S. Rogell

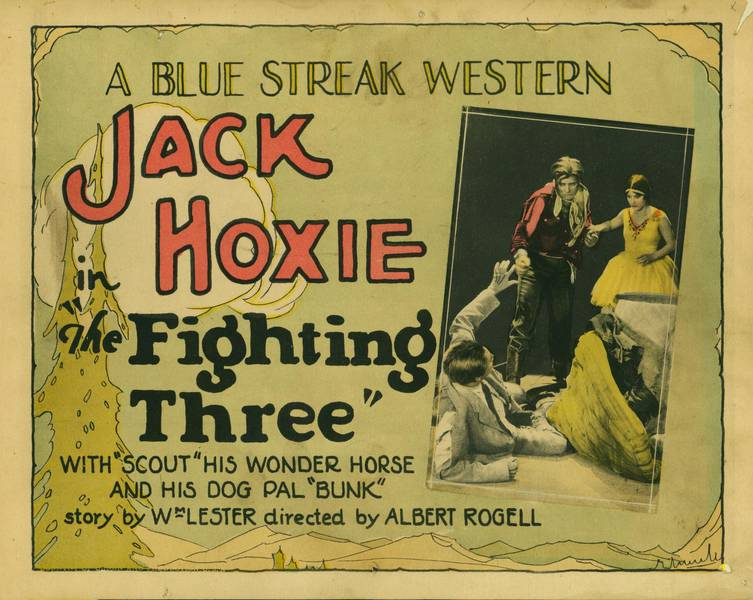
- Directed by: Albert S. Rogell
- Written by: William Berke
- Produced by: Carl Laemmle
- Starring: Jack Hoxie; Olive Hasbrouck; Marin Sais
- Cinematography: William Nobles
- Production company: Universal Pictures
- Distributed by: Universal Pictures
- Release date: July 3, 1927
- Running time: 50 minutes
- Country: United States
- Languages: Silent; English intertitles

The Fighting Three is a 1927 American silent Western film directed by Albert S. Rogell and starring Jack Hoxie, Olive Hasbrouck and Marin Sais.

The film's sets were designed by the art director David S. Garber.

== Cast ==
- Jack Hoxie as Jack Conway
- Olive Hasbrouck as Jeanne D'Arcy
- Marin Sais as Clara Jones
- Fanny Warren as Widow
- William Malan as John D'Arcy
- Buck Connors as Marshal Skinner
- William J. Dyer as Timothy
- Henry Roquemore as Revere
- William Bailey as Steve Clayton
- Scout the Horse as Jack's Horse
- Bunk the Dog as Jack's Dog
