= The Desert of the Lost =

1927 film

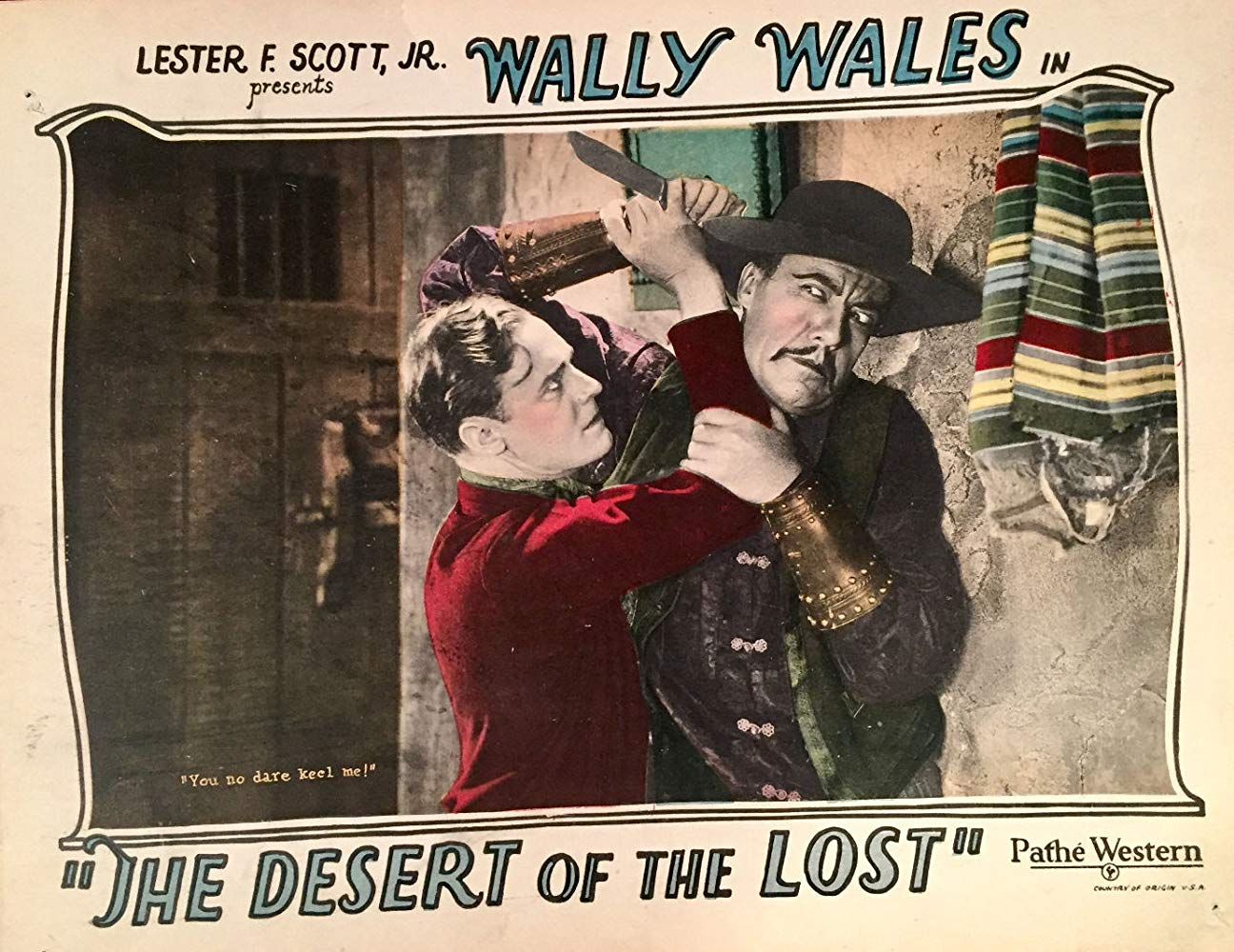
- Directed by: Richard Thorpe
- Written by: Walter J. Coburn; Richard Thorpe
- Produced by: Ralph M. Like; Lester F. Scott Jr.
- Starring: Hal Taliaferro; Peggy Montgomery; Edward Cecil
- Cinematography: Ray Ries
- Production company: Action Pictures
- Distributed by: Pathé Exchange
- Release date: December 18, 1927
- Running time: 58 minutes
- Country: United States
- Languages: Silent; English intertitles

The Desert of the Lost is a 1927 American silent Western film directed by Richard Thorpe and starring Hal Taliaferro, Peggy Montgomery and Edward Cecil.

== Synopsis ==
Having shot a man in self-defense and fled across the border into Mexico with a sheriff and his posse on his tail, an outlaw is forced to head out into the desert.

== Cast ==
- Hal Taliaferro as Jim Drake
- Peggy Montgomery as Dolores Wolfe
- William J. Dyer as Steve Wolfe
- Edward Cecil as Detective Murray
- Richard Neill as El Chino
- Tom Bay as Townsman
- George Magrill as Henchman
- Lafe McKee as Boat Captain
- Ray Murro as Juan - the Half-Breed
- Slim Whitaker as Sheriff
