= Ridgeway of Montana =

1924 film directed by Clifford Smith

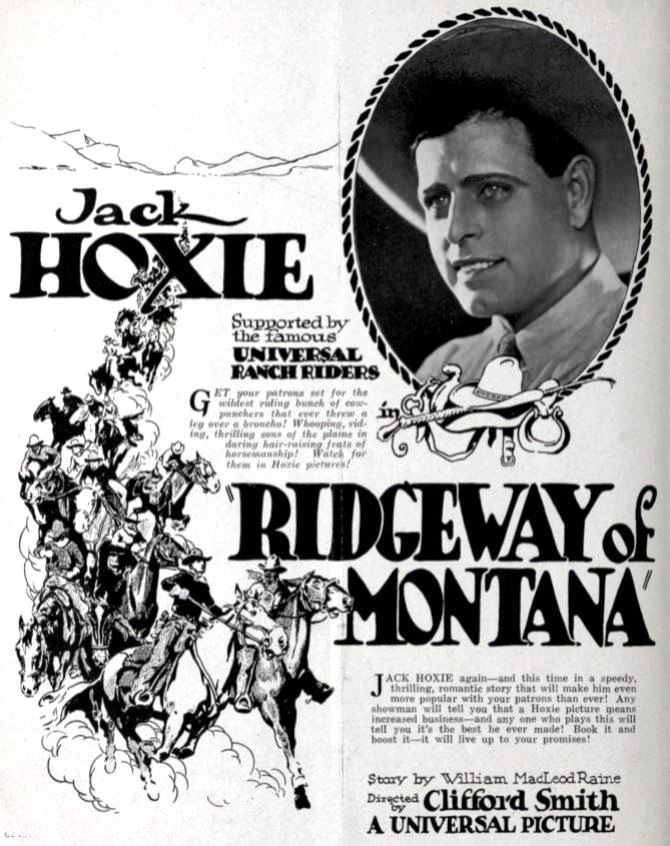
- Advertisement
- Directed by: Clifford Smith
- Written by: Isadore Bernstein; William MacLeod Raine; Richard Schayer; Raymond L. Schrock
- Produced by: Carl Laemmle
- Starring: Jack Hoxie; Olive Hasbrouck; Herbert Fortier
- Cinematography: Harry Neumann
- Production company: Universal Pictures
- Distributed by: Universal Pictures
- Release date: May 12, 1924
- Running time: 5 reels
- Country: United States
- Language: Silent (English intertitles)

Ridgeway of Montana is a 1924 American silent Western film directed by Clifford Smith and starring Jack Hoxie, Olive Hasbrouck, and Herbert Fortier.

== Plot ==
As described in a film magazine review, Buck Ridgeway, wealthy ranchman, captures members of a rustler band, but Pelton, their leader, makes a getaway in great style by jumping from his mount just at a crucial moment and hurdling over a towering rock into the river below. Buck visits the city and meets Aline Hanley who flirts with him, but he does not respond. Piqued, Aline follows him and is lost in the mountains. Buck finds her and a snowstorm compels them to spend the night together in a cabin. Buck weds Aline. She is kidnapped by Pelton. Buck conceals himself in a wagon to serve as a shield from flying bullets, rolls downhill and crashes into Pelton's shack. After a scrapping fight with Pelton, her husband rescues her and Aline is convinced of the sincerity of his love.

== Cast ==
- Jack Hoxie as Buck Ridgeway
- Olive Hasbrouck as Aline Hanley
- Herbert Fortier as Simon Hanley
- Lew Meehan as Steve Pelton
- Charles Thurston as Reverend McNabb
- Pat Harmon as Pete Shagmire
- Lyndon Hobart as Pierre Gendron

== Preservation ==
A print of Ridgeway of Montana is in the collection of EYE Film Institute Netherlands.

== Bibliography ==
- Darby, William. Masters of Lens and Light: A Checklist of Major Cinematographers and Their Feature Films. Scarecrow Press, 1991.
