= Perils of the Wild =

1925 film

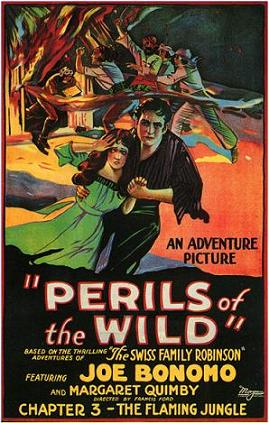
- Theatrical poster
- Directed by: Francis Ford
- Written by: Isadore Bernstein; William Lord Wright
- Based on: The Swiss Family Robinson by Johann David Wyss
- Starring: Joe Bonomo; Margaret Quimby
- Distributed by: Universal Pictures
- Release date: August 27, 1925
- Running time: 15 episodes
- Country: United States
- Language: Silent (English intertitles)

Perils of the Wild is a 1925 American silent adventure film serial directed by Francis Ford. The film is considered to be lost. This serial was based on the 1812 novel The Swiss Family Robinson by Johann David Wyss.

== Cast ==
- Joe Bonomo as Frederick Robinson.
- Margaret Quimby as Emily Montrose
- Jack Mower as Sir Charles Leicester
- Alfred Allen as Captain William Robinson
- Eva Gordon as Frau Mitilla Robinson
- Jack Murphy as Jack Robinson
- Howard Enstedt as Ernest Robinson
- Francis Irwin as Francis Robinson
- William Dyer as Black John
- Albert Prisco as Tonie
- Fanny Warren as Bonita (as Fannie Warren)
- John Wallace as Pirate
- James Welsh as Pirate
- Philip Ford as Pirate (as Phil Ford)
- Sammy Gervon as Pirate
- Boris Karloff

== Production ==
Bonomo performed his own stunts. He fractured his leg and received an injured sacroiliac during filming.

== Chapter titles ==
1. The Hurricane
2. The Lion's Fangs
3. The Flaming Jungle
4. The Treasure Cave
5. Saved by the Sun
6. The Jungle Trail
7. Pirate Peril
8. Winds of Fate
9. Rock of Revenge
10. The Rescue
11. The Stolen Wedding
12. Marooned
13. Prisoners of the Sea
14. The Leopard's Lair
15. In the Nick of Time

== See also ==
- List of film serials
- List of film serials by studio
- List of lost films
- Boris Karloff filmography
