= The Meddlin' Stranger =

1927 film

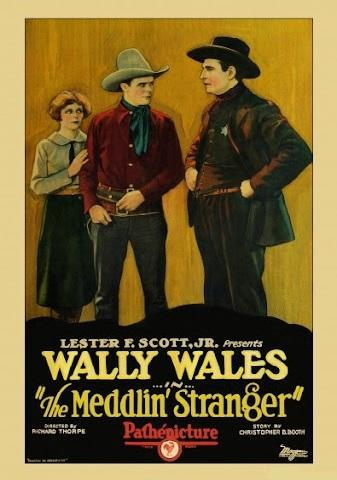
- Directed by: Richard Thorpe
- Written by: Christopher Booth
- Starring: Wally Wales; Nola Luxford
- Cinematography: Ray Ries
- Production company: Action Pictures
- Distributed by: Pathé Exchange
- Release date: June 12, 1927
- Running time: 50 minutes
- Country: United States
- Languages: Silent; English intertitles

The Meddlin' Stranger is a lost 1927 American silent Western film directed by Richard Thorpe and featuring Wally Wales and Boris Karloff.

== Cast ==
- Wally Wales as Wally Fraser
- Nola Luxford as Mildred Crawford
- Charles K. French as Her Father
- Mabel Van Buren as Her Mother
- James A. Marcus as 'Big Bill' Dawson (as James Marcus)
- Boris Karloff as Al Meggs

== See also ==
- Boris Karloff filmography
