= Olive Hasbrouck =

American actress (1907–1976)

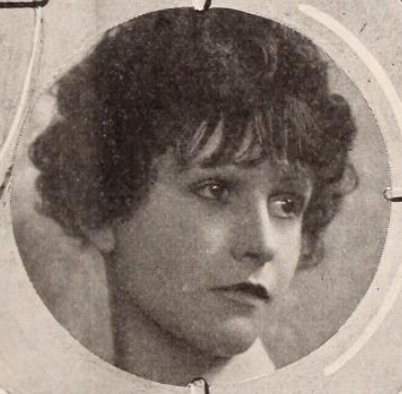
- Hasbrouck, from a 1929 advertisement
- Born: January 23, 1907; Lewiston, Idaho, U.S.
- Died: January 1, 1976 (aged 68); San Diego, California, U.S.
- Other name: Olive Whittier
- Occupation: Actress
- Years active: 1924-1929 (film)
- Relatives: Sol Hasbrouck (grandfather); Max Whittier (father-in-law)

Olive Elizabeth Hasbrouck Whittier (January 23, 1907 – January 1, 1976) was an American film actress of the silent era. She appeared in dozens of films, mostly Westerns, between 1924 and 1929.

== Early life ==
Hasbrouck was born in Lewiston, Idaho, the daughter of Van Wagenen Hasbrouck and Ladia Marguerite Pingree Hasbrouck. Her father was an attorney. Her grandfather was Sol Hasbrouck, an Idaho pioneer and politician. She and her mother moved from Boise to Hollywood for her health. Hasbrouck attended Hollywood High School until she started getting film roles.

== Career ==
Hasbrouck began working in films as an extra at Universal City. When she was 17, she won the lead female roles in Ridgeway of Montana (1924) and in Big Timber (1924) opposite William Desmond. By 1925 she was considered a star, leading the cast in Two Blocks Away. She was a skilled rider, athletic and willing to do stunts, so most of her roles were in silent Westerns. She also appeared in an early sound comedy set at sea, Clear the Decks (1929) with Reginald Denny. Louella Parsons described Hasbrouck as resembling Norma Talmadge.

In January 1929, Hasbrouck signed with First National; she co-starred with Philippe de Lacy and Ken Maynard in The Royal Rider (1929), which turned out to be her last film.

== Later life ==
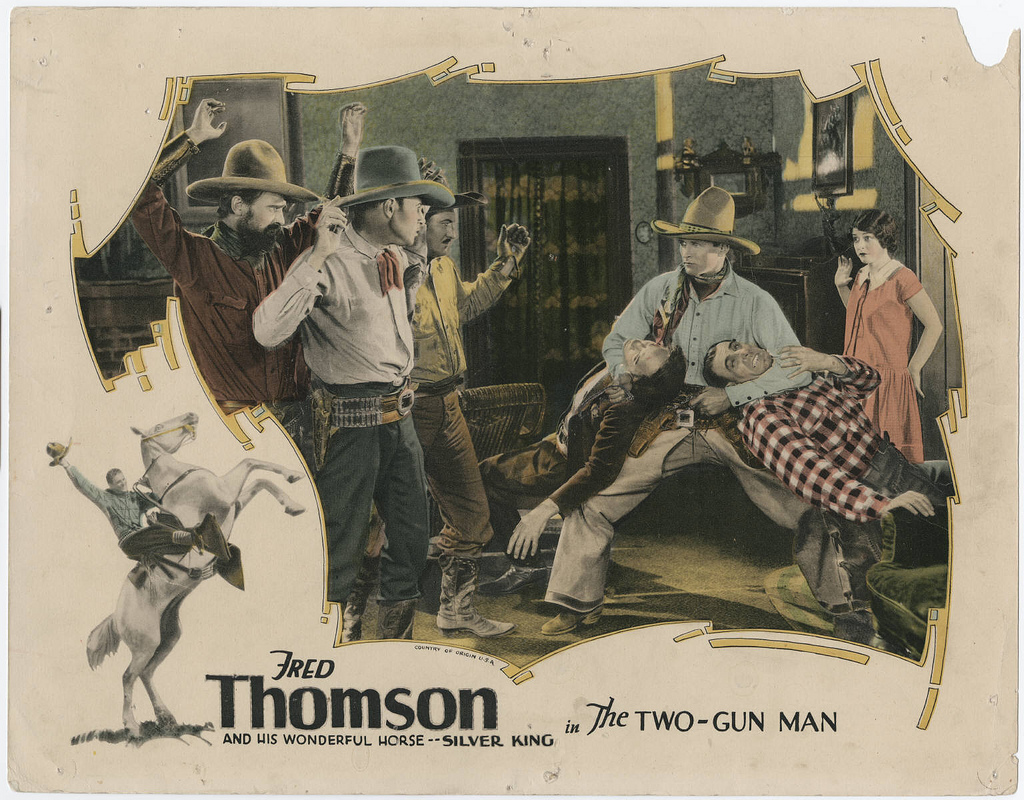
Olive Hasbrouck (right) on the poster for The Two-Gun Man (1926)

Hasbrouck's younger brother died in an explosion in 1926. She retired from the movie industry just as sound films were introduced, when she married Nelson Paul Whittier (son of oil executive and real estate developer Max Whittier) in 1930. They had children, Laddia and Peter, and lived on a cattle ranch in Yucaipa, and in a penthouse in Westwood. She died in 1976, at the age of 68, in San Diego.

== Partial filmography ==
- Big Timber (1924)
- Ridgeway of Montana (1924)
- The Call of Courage (1925)
- Hidden Loot (1925)
- The Cohens and Kellys (1926)
- The Interferin' Gent (1926)
- Rustlers' Ranch (1926)
- A Six Shootin' Romance (1926)
- The Border Sheriff (1926)
- A Regular Scout (1926)
- The Two-Gun Man (1926)
- The Ridin' Rascal (1926)
- White Pebbles (1927)
- Set Free (1927)
- Ride 'em High (1927)
- Pals in Peril (1927)
- The Fighting Three (1927)
- The Obligin' Buckaroo (1927)
- The Ridin' Rowdy (1927)
- Tearin' Into Trouble (1927)
- The Shamrock and the Rose (1927)
- The Woman Who Did Not Care (1927)
- Desperate Courage (1928)
- The Cowboy Cavalier (1928)
- The Charge of the Gauchos (1928)
- The Flyin' Cowboy (1928)
- Clear the Decks (1929)
- The Royal Rider (1929)
