= William J. Dyer =

American actor (1881–1933)

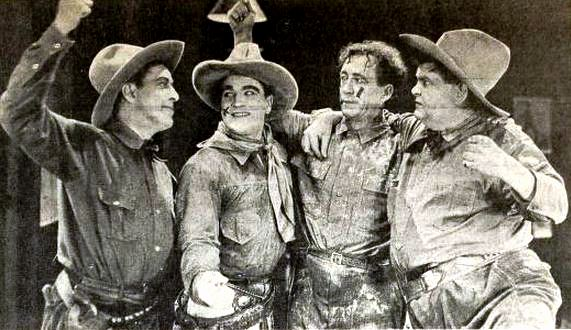
- Still showing Dyer (far right) in Fightin' Mad (1921)
- Born: 11 March 1881; Atlanta, Georgia, U.S.
- Died: 22 December 1933 (aged 52); Hollywood, California, U.S.
- Occupation: Actor
- Years active: 1915-1933

William J. Dyer (March 11, 1881 – December 22, 1933) was an American actor of the silent era. He appeared in dozens of films, mostly Westerns and action films, between 1915 and 1933. He was born in Atlanta, Georgia and died in Hollywood, California. He was also credited as William Dyer and Bill Dyer.

== Selected filmography ==
- Broken Fetters (1916)
- The Great Problem (1916)
- Two Seats at the Opera (1916)
- Black Orchids (1917)
- Triumph (1917)
- Anything Once (1917)
- Come Through (1917)
- The Reward of the Faithless (1917)
- '49–'17 (1917)
- Madame Sphinx (1918)
- All Night (1918)
- The Red Glove (1919)
- The Four-Bit Man (1919)
- The Trail of the Octopus (1919)
- The Mayor of Filbert (1919)
- The Screaming Shadow (1920)
- The Courage of Marge O'Doone (1920)
- The Sheriff of Hope Eternal (1921)
- Cyclone Bliss (1921)
- Cupid's Brand (1921)
- The Silent Call (1921)
- Fightin' Mad (1921)
- The Cowboy King (1922)
- The Crow's Nest (1922)
- Don't Shoot (1922)
- Wild Bill Hickok (1923)
- The Measure of a Man (1924)
- Trigger Fingers (1924)
- Marry in Haste (1924)
- The Martyr Sex (1924)
- Perils of the Wild (1925)
- The Pony Express (1925)
- Lone Hand Saunders (1926)
- Looking for Trouble (1926)
- The Man in the Saddle (1926)
- The Desert of the Lost (1927)
- The Fighting Three (1927)
- Desperate Courage (1928)
- Thunder Riders (1928)
- Overland Bound (1929)
- Code of Honor (1930)
- Honor of the Mounted (1932)
- Gun Justice (1933)
- Sagebrush Trail (1933)
