= The Measure of a Man (1924 film) =

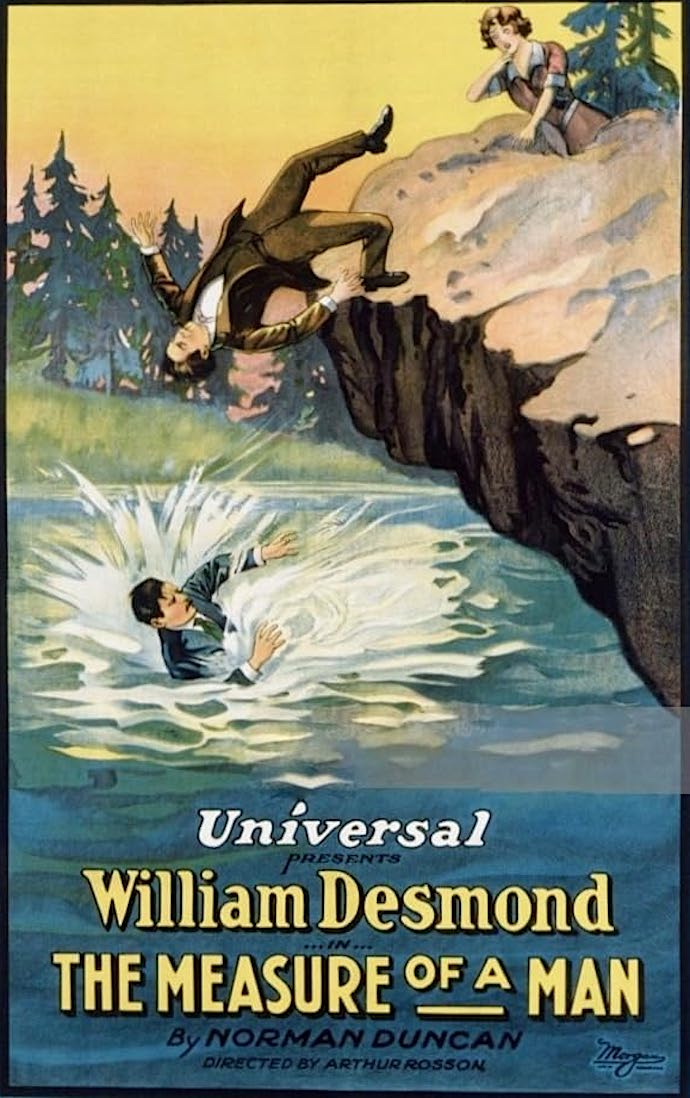
- Film poster
- Directed by: Arthur Rosson
- Written by: Norman Duncan (novel); Isadore Bernstein; Wyndham Gittens
- Starring: William Desmond; Marin Sais; Francis Ford
- Cinematography: Jackson Rose
- Production company: Universal Pictures
- Distributed by: Universal Pictures
- Release date: October 14, 1924
- Running time: 50 minutes
- Country: United States
- Languages: Silent; English intertitles

The Measure of a Man is a 1924 American silent drama film directed by Arthur Rosson and starring William Desmond, Marin Sais and Francis Ford.

== Cast ==
- William Desmond as John Fairmeadow
- Albert J. Smith as Jack Flack
- Francis Ford as 'Pale' Peter
- Marin Sais as Clare, his wife
- William Dyer as Billy the Beast
- Robert Gordon as Donald
- Harry Tenbrook as Charley
- Zala Davis as Jenny Hitch
- William H. Turner as Tom Hitch
- Mary McAllister as Pattie Batch

== Preservation ==
With no holdings located in archives, The Measure of a Man is considered a lost film.

== Bibliography ==
- Robert B. Connelly. The Silents: Silent Feature Films, 1910-36, Volume 40, Issue 2. December Press, 1998.
