= Isadore Bernstein =

American screenwriter

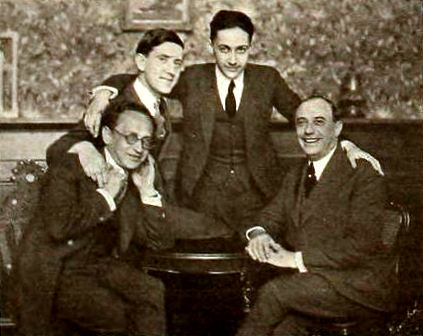
- Left to right: Bernstein, Sam Van Ronkle, Louis Loeb, and Irving Thalberg in May 1920
- Born: November 26, 1876; New York City, U.S.
- Died: October 19, 1944 (aged 67); Los Angeles, U.S.
- Occupation: Screenwriter
- Years active: 1914–1938
- Relatives: Carl Laemmle (brother-in-law)

Isadore Bernstein (November 26, 1876 – October 19, 1944) was an American screenwriter.

== Biography ==
Isadore Bernstein was born in New York City on November 26, 1876. He wrote screenplays for over 60 films between 1914 and 1938. He also worked as the West Coast studio manager for film producer and Universal Pictures co-founder Carl Laemmle, who was his brother-in-law. He died of a heart attack in the Hollywood neighborhood of Los Angeles on October 19, 1944, at the age of 67.

== Selected filmography ==
- Nuts in May (1917)
- Tarzan of the Apes (1918)
- The Great Alone (1922)
- The Miracle Baby (1923)
- Pure Grit (1923)
- The Red Warning (1923)
- The Man from Wyoming (1924)
- Fighting Fury (1924)
- The Back Trail (1924)
- Big Timber (1924)
- Ridgeway of Montana (1924)
- The Measure of a Man (1924)
- The Sunset Trail (1924)
- The Sign of the Cactus (1925)
- Ridin' Thunder (1925)
- The Great Circus Mystery (1925)
- Perils of the Wild (1925)
- The Meddler (1925)
- Ace of Spades (1925)
- His People (1925)
- The Burning Trail (1925)
- The Arizona Sweepstakes (1926)
- The Ridin' Rascal (1926)
- The Shamrock and the Rose (1927)
- The Valley of Hell (1927)
- The Wild West Show (1928)
- The Masked Angel (1928)
- The Devil's Cage (1928)
- Life's Mockery (1928)
- George Washington Cohen (1928)
- Broken Barriers (1928)
- Lucky Boy (1929)
- Daughters of Desire (1929)
- Montmartre Rose (1929)
- The Clean Up (1929)
- The Dream Melody (1929)
- One Splendid Hour (1929)
- No Greater Love (1932)
- For the Service (1936)
- Tugboat Princess (1936)
- Lightning Carson Rides Again (1938)
- Six-Gun Trail (1938)
