= List of American films of 1927 =

American films released in 1927

More than 678 American feature films were released in 1927, 25 with synchronized sound. All films on this list are in the Public Domain since 2023.

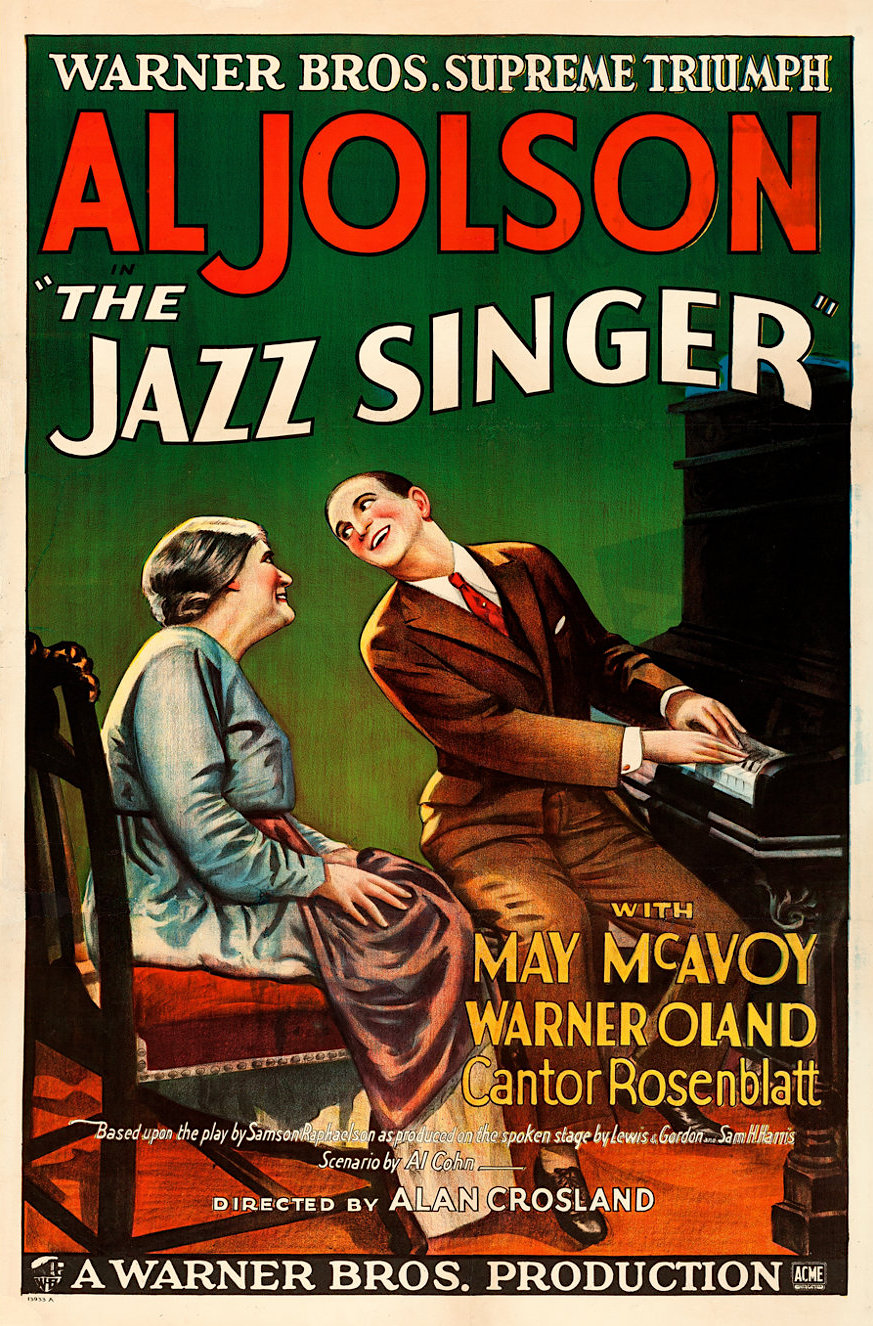
The Jazz Singer starring Al Jolson.

== 1927 Academy Award nominees ==
The 1st Academy Awards were presented in Los Angeles on May 16, 1929 at The Hollywood Roosevelt Hotel. The ceremonies were hosted by Douglas Fairbanks. 1927 films released between July 1 and December 31 were eligible for the initial awards.

Wings, released in August 1927, won the Academy Award for Best Picture and Sunrise: A Song of Two Humans, released in September 1927, won in the other Best Picture category (presented only once) — Unique and Artistic Production. There were two other nominees for Best Picture — 7th Heaven, initially released in May 1927, before the eligibility period, but subsequently re-released in September — and 1928's The Racket. The other two nominees for Unique and Artistic Production were: Chang: A Drama of the Wilderness (released in April 1927, also before the eligibility period, but still in general distribution after July 1) and 1928's The Crowd.

- 5 nominations [3 wins]: 7th Heaven (Outstanding Picture, Best Director—Dramatic Picture [win], Best Actress [win], Best Writing—Adapted Story [win], Best Art Direction)
- 4 nominations [3 wins]: Sunrise: A Song of Two Humans (Unique and Artistic Production [win], Best Actress [win], Best Cinematography [win], Best Art Direction)
- 2 nominations [2 wins]: Wings (Outstanding Picture [win], Best Engineering Effects [win])
- 1 nomination plus 1 Honorary Award: The Jazz Singer (Best Writing—Adapted Story, Honorary Award for pioneer outstanding talking picture)
- 1 nomination [1 win]: The Dove (Best Art Direction [win])
- 1 nomination [1 win]: Two Arabian Knights (Best Director—Comedy Picture [win])
- 1 nomination [1 win]: The Way of All Flesh (Best Actor [win])
- 1 nomination: Sorrell and Son (Best Director)
- 1 nomination: The Patent Leather Kid (Best Actor)
- 1 nomination: Underworld (Best Writing—Original Story)
- 1 nomination: The Devil Dancer (Best Cinematography)
- 1 nomination: The Magic Flame (Best Cinematography)
- 1 nomination: Chang: A Drama of the Wilderness (Unique and Artistic Production)
- 1 nomination: The Private Life of Helen of Troy (Best Writing—Title Writing)

== A ==
Title	Director	Featured Cast	Genre	Note
7th Heaven	Frank Borzage	Janet Gaynor, Charles Farrell	War	Fox Film. 5 Academy Award nominations
Adam and Evil	Robert Z. Leonard	Lew Cody, Aileen Pringle	Comedy	MGM
The Adventurous Soul	Gene Carroll	Mildred Harris, Tom Santschi, Charles K. French	Drama	Independent
Aflame in the Sky	J. P. McGowan	Sharon Lynn, Jack Luden	Adventure	FBO
Afraid to Love	Edward H. Griffith	Florence Vidor, Clive Brook, Norman Trevor	Comedy	Paramount
After Midnight	Monta Bell	Norma Shearer, Lawrence Gray	Drama	MGM
Ain't Love Funny?	Del Andrews	Alberta Vaughn, Syd Crossley	Comedy	FBO
Alias the Lone Wolf	Edward H. Griffith	Bert Lytell, Lois Wilson	Crime	Columbia
All Aboard	Charles Hines	Johnny Hines, Edna Murphy	Comedy	First National
Almost Human	Frank Urson	Vera Reynolds, Kenneth Thomson, Majel Coleman	Drama	Pathé Exchange
Altars of Desire	Christy Cabanne	Mae Murray, Conway Tearle	Drama	MGM
American Beauty	Richard Wallace	Billie Dove, Lloyd Hughes, Walter McGrail	Comedy	First National
The Angel of Broadway	Lois Weber	Leatrice Joy, Victor Varconi, May Robson	Drama	Pathé Exchange
An Affair of the Follies	Millard Webb	Lewis Stone, Billie Dove, Lloyd Hughes	Drama	First National
The American	J. Stuart Blackton	Bessie Love, Charles Ray	Western	Natural Vision Pictures
Ankles Preferred	John G. Blystone	Madge Bellamy, Lawrence Gray	Comedy	Fox Film
Annie Laurie	John S. Robertson	Lillian Gish, Norman Kerry, Creighton Hale	Historical	MGM
Arizona Bound	John Waters	Gary Cooper, El Brendel	Western	Paramount
Arizona Nights	Lloyd Ingraham	Fred Thomson, Nora Lane	Western	FBO
The Arizona Whirlwind	William James Craft	Bill Cody, David Dunbar	Western	Pathé Exchange
The Arizona Wildcat	Roy William Neill	Tom Mix, Dorothy Sebastian	Western	Fox Film
The Auctioneer	Alfred E. Green	George Sidney, Marian Nixon	Comedy	Fox Film
Avenging Fangs	Ernest Van Pelt	Kenneth MacDonald, Helen Lynch	Action	Chesterfield

== B ==
Title	Director	Featured Cast	Genre	Note
Babe Comes Home	Ted Wilde	Babe Ruth, Anna Q. Nilsson, Louise Fazenda	Sports	First National
The Bachelor's Baby	Frank R. Strayer	Helene Chadwick, Harry Myers	Comedy	Columbia
Back to God's Country	Irvin Willat	Renée Adorée, Robert Frazer	Adventure	Universal
Back to Liberty	Bernard McEveety	George Walsh, Edmund Breese	Crime	Independent
Backstage	Phil Goldstone	William Collier Jr., Barbara Bedford, Alberta Vaughn	Comedy	Tiffany
The Bandit's Son	Wallace Fox	Bob Steele, Thomas G. Lingham	Western	FBO
Barbed Wire	Rowland V. Lee	Pola Negri, Clive Brook	Drama	Paramount
The Beauty Shoppers	Louis J. Gasnier	Mae Busch, Doris Hill	Comedy	Tiffany
Becky	John P. McCarthy	Owen Moore, Sally O'Neil	Comedy	MGM
The Beloved Rogue	Alan Crosland	John Barrymore, Marceline Day, Conrad Veidt	Swashbuckler	United Artists
Better Days	Frank S. Mattison	Mary Carr, Gareth Hughes	Drama	Independent
Between Dangers	Richard Thorpe	Buddy Roosevelt, Alma Rayford	Action	Pathé Exchange
Beware of Widows	Wesley Ruggles	Laura La Plante, Bryant Washburn	Comedy	Universal
Birds of Prey	William James Craft	Priscilla Dean, Gustav von Seyffertitz	Crime	Columbia
Bitter Apples	Harry O. Hoyt	Monte Blue, Myrna Loy	Drama	Warner Bros.
The Black Diamond Express	Howard Bretherton	Monte Blue, Edna Murphy	Drama	Warner Bros.
Black Jack	Orville O. Dull	Buck Jones, Barbara Bennett	Western	Fox Film
Blazing Days	William Wyler	Fred Humes, Ena Gregory	Western	Universal
Blind Alleys	Blind Alleys	Thomas Meighan, Evelyn Brent, Greta Nissen	Drama	Paramount
Blonde or Brunette	Richard Rosson	Adolphe Menjou, Greta Nissen, Arlette Marchal	Comedy	Paramount
Blondes by Choice	Hampton Del Ruth	Claire Windsor, Walter Hiers, Bess Flowers	Comedy	Gotham
The Blood Ship	George B. Seitz	Hobart Bosworth, Jacqueline Logan, Richard Arlen	Drama	Columbia
Blood Will Tell	Ray Flynn	Buck Jones, Katherine Perry	Western	Fox Film
Body and Soul	Reginald Barker	Aileen Pringle, Norman Kerry, Lionel Barrymore	Drama	MGM
Border Blackbirds	Leo D. Maloney	Leo D. Maloney, Eugenia Gilbert, Nelson McDowell	Western	Pathé Exchange
The Border Cavalier	William Wyler	Fred Humes, Evelyn Pierce	Western	Universal
Born to Battle	Alan James	Bill Cody, Barbara Luddy	Western	Pathé Exchange
A Bowery Cinderella	Burton L. King	Gladys Hulette, Pat O'Malley	Drama	Independent
A Boy of the Streets	Charles J. Hunt	Johnnie Walker, Betty Francisco	Drama	Rayart
The Boy Rider	Louis King	Buzz Barton, Sam Nelson	Western	FBO
Brass Knuckles	Lloyd Bacon	Monte Blue, Betty Bronson	Crime drama	Warner Bros.
Breakfast at Sunrise	Malcolm St. Clair	Constance Talmadge, Alice White	Comedy	First National
Breed of Courage	Howard M. Mitchell	Sam Nelson, Jean Fenwick	Drama	FBO
Broadway After Midnight	Fred Windemere	Matthew Betz, Priscilla Bonner, Cullen Landis	Crime	Independent
The Broadway Drifter	Bernard McEveety	George Walsh, Arthur Donaldson	Drama	Independent
Broadway Madness	Burton L. King	Marguerite De La Motte, Donald Keith	Drama	Independent
Broadway Nights	Joseph Boyle	Lois Wilson, Sam Hardy, June Collyer	Drama	First National
The Broken Gate	James C. McKay (director)	Dorothy Phillips, William Collier Jr., Jean Arthur	Drama	Tiffany
The Broncho Buster	Ernst Laemmle	Fred Humes, Gloria Grey	Western	Universal
The Broncho Twister	Orville O. Dull	Tom Mix, Helene Costello, Nancy Drexel	Western	Fox Film
The Brute	Irving Cummings	Monte Blue, Leila Hyams, Clyde Cook	Western	Warner Bros.
The Bugle Call	Edward Sedgwick	Jackie Coogan, Claire Windsor, Herbert Rawlinson	Drama	MGM
Bulldog Pluck	Jack Nelson	Bob Custer, Viora Daniel	Western	FBO
Burning Gold	John W. Noble	Herbert Rawlinson, Shirley Palmer	Drama	Independent
Burnt Fingers	Maurice S. Campbell	Eileen Percy, Edna Murphy	Mystery	Pathé Exchange
The Bush Leaguer	Howard Bretherton	Monte Blue, Clyde Cook, Leila Hyams	Comedy	Warner Bros.
Buttons	George W. Hill	Jackie Coogan, Lars Hanson, Gertrude Olmstead	Drama	MGM
By Whose Hand?	Walter Lang	Ricardo Cortez, Eugenia Gilbert	Crime	Columbia

== C ==
Title	Director	Featured Cast	Genre	Note
Cabaret	Robert G. Vignola	Gilda Gray, Tom Moore	Crime	Paramount
Cactus Trails	Scott Pembroke	Bob Custer, Lew Meehan	Western	FBO
California	W. S. Van Dyke	Tim McCoy, Dorothy Sebastian	Western	MGM
California or Bust	Phil Rosen	George O'Hara, Helen Foster	Comedy	FBO
The Callahans and the Murphy	George W. Hill	Marie Dressler, Polly Moran, Lawrence Gray	Comedy	MGM
The Cancelled Debt	Phil Rosen	Rex Lease, Charlotte Stevens	Comedy	Independent
Captain Salvation	John S. Robertson	Lars Hanson, Marceline Day, Pauline Starke	Drama	MGM
Casey at the Bat	Monte Brice	Wallace Beery, Ford Sterling, Zasu Pitts	Sports comedy	Paramount
Casey Jones	Charles J. Hunt	Ralph Lewis, Kate Price, Al St. John	Action	Rayart
The Cat and the Canary	Paul Leni	Laura La Plante, Forrest Stanley, Creighton Hale	Comedy, Horror, Mystery	Universal
Catch-As-Catch-Can	Charles Hutchison	William Fairbanks, Rose Blossom, Walter Shumway	Action	Gotham
Chain Lightning	Lambert Hillyer	Buck Jones, Diane Ellis	Western	Fox Film
Chang: A Drama of the Wilderness	Merian Cooper and Ernest B. Schoedsack	Kru, Chantui, Nah, Ladah, Bimbo	Semi-staged documentary	Paramount. 1 Academy Award nomination
Cheaters	Oscar Apfel	Pat O'Malley, Helen Ferguson, George Hackathorne	Drama	Tiffany
Cheating Cheaters	Edward Laemmle	Betty Compson, Kenneth Harlan	Comedy	Universal
The Cherokee Kid	Robert De Lacey	Tom Tyler, Sharon Lynn	Western	FBO
Chicago	Cecil B. DeMille	Phyllis Haver, Victor Varconi, Julia Faye	Comedy Drama	Pathé Exchange
Children of Divorce	Frank Lloyd	Clara Bow, Esther Ralston, Gary Cooper	Drama	Paramount
The Chinese Parrot	Paul Leni	Marian Nixon, Florence Turner	Mystery	Universal
The Circus Ace	Benjamin Stoloff	Tom Mix, Natalie Joyce	Western	Fox Film
The City Gone Wild	James Cruze	Thomas Meighan, Louise Brooks	Crime	Paramount
City of Shadows	J. P. McGowan	Sharon Lynn, Jack Luden	Crime	FBO
Clancy's Kosher Wedding	Arvid E. Gillstrom	George Sidney, Mary Gordon	Comedy	FBO
The Claw	Sidney Olcott	Norman Kerry, Claire Windsor	Drama	Universal
The Climbers	Paul L. Stein	Irene Rich, Clyde Cook, Florence Fair	Drama	Warner Bros.
Closed Gates	Phil Rosen	Johnny Harron, Jane Novak, Lucy Beaumont	Drama	Independent
The Clown	William James Craft	Dorothy Revier, Johnnie Walker	Crime	Columbia
Code of the Cow Country	Oscar Apfel	Buddy Roosevelt, Elsa Benham	Western	Pathé Exchange
Code of the Range	Bennett Cohen, Morris R. Schlank	Jack Perrin, Nelson McDowell, Pauline Curley	Western	Rayart
Colleen	Frank O'Connor	Madge Bellamy, Charles Morton	Comedy	Fox Film
College	James W. Horne	Buster Keaton, Anne Cornwall	Romantic comedy	United Artists
The College Hero	Walter Lang	Pauline Garon, Ben Turpin, Robert Agnew	Romantic comedy	Columbia
The College Widow	Archie Mayo	Dolores Costello, William Collier Jr., Anders Randolf	Comedy	Warner Bros.
Combat	Albert Hiatt	George Walsh, Claire Adams, Gladys Hulette	Adventure	Pathé Exchange
Come to My House	Alfred E. Green	Olive Borden, Antonio Moreno	Drama	Fox Film
Convoy	Lothar Mendes	Lowell Sherman, Dorothy Mackaill, William Collier Jr.	Drama	First National
The Country Doctor	Rupert Julian	Rudolph Schildkraut, Virginia Bradford, Gladys Brockwell	Drama	Pathé Exchange
The Coward	Alfred Raboch	Warner Baxter, Sharon Lynn	Drama	FBO
Cradle Snatchers	Howard Hawks	Louise Fazenda, Ethel Wales	Drama	Fox Film
The Cruel Truth	Phil Rosen	Hedda Hopper, Constance Howard	Drama	Independent
The Cruise of the Hellion	Duke Worne	Donald Keith, Edna Murphy, Tom Santschi	Drama	Rayart
The Crystal Cup	John Francis Dillon	Dorothy Mackaill, Rockliffe Fellowes, Jack Mulhall	Drama	First National
The Cyclone Cowboy	Richard Thorpe	Hal Taliaferro, George Magrill	Western	Pathé Exchange
Cyclone of the Range	Robert De Lacey	Tom Tyler, Elsie Tarron	Western	FBO

== D ==
Title	Director	Featured Cast	Genre	Note
Dance Magic	Victor Halperin	Pauline Starke, Ben Lyon, Isobel Elsom	Drama	First National
Daring Deeds	Duke Worne	Billy Sullivan, Molly Malone	Comedy	Rayart
Dearie	Archie Mayo	Irene Rich, William Collier Jr., Edna Murphy	Drama	Warner Bros.
The Demi-Bride	Robert Z. Leonard	Norma Shearer, Lew Cody, Carmel Myers	Drama	MGM
The Denver Dude	B. Reeves Eason	Hoot Gibson, Blanche Mehaffey, Robert McKim	Western	Universal
Desert Dust	William Wyler	Ted Wells, Lotus Thompson	Western	Universal
The Desert of the Lost	Richard Thorpe	Hal Taliaferro, Peggy Montgomery	Western	Pathé Exchange
The Desert Pirate	James Dugan	Tom Tyler, Frankie Darro	Western	FBO
The Desired Woman	Michael Curtiz	Irene Rich, William Russell	Drama	Warner Bros.
The Devil Dancer	Fred Niblo	Gilda Gray, Clive Brook, Anna May Wong	Romance	United Artists. United Artists. 1 Academy Award nomination
The Devil's Masterpiece	John P. McCarthy	Virginia Brown Faire, Gordon Brinkley, Fred Kohler	Melodrama	Goodwill Distributing
The Devil's Saddle	Albert S. Rogell	Ken Maynard, Kathleen Collins, Francis Ford	Western	First National
The Devil's Twin	Leo D. Maloney	Leo D. Maloney, Josephine Hill	Western	Pathé Exchange
A Dog of the Regiment	D. Ross Lederman	Dorothy Gulliver, Rin Tin Tin	Drama	Warner Bros.
Don Desperado	Leo D. Maloney	Leo D. Maloney, Eugenia Gilbert	Western	Pathé Exchange
Don Mike	Lloyd Ingraham	Fred Thomson, Ruth Clifford	Romance	FBO
Don't Tell the Wife	Paul L. Stein	Irene Rich, Huntley Gordon, Lilyan Tashman	Romantic comedy	Warner Bros.
The Dove	Roland West	Norma Talmadge, Noah Beery, Gilbert Roland	Romance	United Artists. 1 Academy Award nomination
The Down Grade	Charles Hutchison	William Fairbanks, Alice Calhoun, Charles K. French	Action	Gotham
Down the Stretch	King Baggot	Robert Agnew, Marian Nixon	Drama	Universal
Dress Parade	Donald Crisp	William Boyd, Bessie Love	Romance	Pathé Exchange
Driven from Home	James Young	Virginia Lee Corbin, Pauline Garon, Anna May Wong	Drama	Independent
The Drop Kick	Millard Webb	Richard Barthelmess, Barbara Kent	Drama	First National
Drums of the Desert	John Waters	Warner Baxter, Marietta Millner	Western	Paramount
Duty's Reward	Bertram Bracken	Alan Roscoe, Eva Novak	Drama	Independent

== E ==
Title	Director	Featured Cast	Genre	Note
East Side, West Side	Allan Dwan	George O'Brien, Virginia Valli	Drama	Fox Film
Easy Pickings	George Archainbaud	Anna Q. Nilsson, Kenneth Harlan, Philo McCullough	Mystery	First National
The Enchanted Island	William G. Crosby	Henry B. Walthall, Charlotte Stevens	Drama	Tiffany
Enemies of Society	Ralph Ince	Conway Tearle, Margaret Morris	Silent	FBO
The Enemy	Fred Niblo	Lillian Gish, Ralph Forbes	Drama	MGM
Evening Clothes	Luther Reed	Adolphe Menjou, Virginia Valli, Louise Brooks	Comedy	Paramount
Eyes of the Totem	W. S. Van Dyke	Wanda Hawley, Tom Santschi, Anne Cornwall	Drama	Pathé Exchange

== F ==
Title	Director	Featured Cast	Genre	Note
Face Value	Robert Florey	Fritzi Ridgeway, Jack Mower	Drama	Independent
The Fair Co-Ed	Sam Wood	Marion Davies, Johnny Mack Brown, Jane Winton	Comedy	MGM
Fangs of Destiny	Stuart Paton	Edmund Cobb, George Periolat	Western	Universal
Fashions for Women	Dorothy Arzner	Esther Ralston, Raymond Hatton, Einar Hanson	Drama	Paramount
Fast and Furious	Melville W. Brown	Reginald Denny, Barbara Worth	Comedy	Universal
The Fightin' Comeback	Tenny Wright	Buddy Roosevelt, Clara Horton	Western	Pathé Exchange
The Fighting Eagle	Donald Crisp	Rod La Rocque, Phyllis Haver	Adventure	Pathé Exchange
The Fighting Hombre	Jack Nelson	Bob Custer, David Dunbar	Western	FBO
Fighting Love	Nils Olaf Chrisander	Jetta Goudal, Victor Varconi, Henry B. Walthall	Drama	PDC
The Fighting Three	Albert S. Rogell	Jack Hoxie, Olive Hasbrouck, Marin Sais	Western	Universal
Figures Don't Lie	A. Edward Sutherland	Esther Ralston, Richard Arlen, Ford Sterling	Comedy	Paramount
The Final Extra	James P. Hogan	Marguerite De La Motte, Grant Withers, John Miljan	Crime	Gotham
Finger Prints	Lloyd Bacon	Louise Fazenda, John T. Murray, Myrna Loy	Comedy	Warner Bros.
Finnegan's Ball	James P. Hogan	Blanche Mehaffey, Mack Swain, Cullen Landis	Comedy	Independent
Fireman, Save My Child	A. Edward Sutherland	Wallace Beery, Raymond Hatton, Josephine Dunn	Comedy	Paramount
The First Auto	Roy Del Ruth	Russell Simpson, Patsy Ruth Miller, Charles Emmett Mack	Comedy drama	Warner Bros.
The First Night	Richard Thorpe	Bert Lytell, Dorothy Devore	Comedy	Tiffany
Flying Luck	Herman C. Raymaker	Monty Banks, Jean Arthur	Comedy	Pathé Exchange
The Flying U Ranch	Robert De Lacey	Tom Tyler, Nora Lane	Western	FBO
For Ladies Only	Scott Pembroke	John Bowers, Jacqueline Logan	Romantic comedy	Columbia
For the Love of Mike	Frank Capra	Ben Lyon, Claudette Colbert	Romance	First National
The Forbidden Woman	Paul L. Stein	Jetta Goudal, Victor Varconi, Joseph Schildkraut	Drama	Pathé Exchange
Foreign Devils	W. S. Van Dyke	Tim McCoy, Claire Windsor	Adventure	MGM
The Fortune Hunter	Charles Reisner	Sydney Chaplin, Helene Costello	Comedy	Warner Bros.
Fourth Commandment	Emory Johnson	Henry Victor, June Marlowe, Belle Bennett	Drama	Universal
Framed	Charles Brabin	Milton Sills, Natalie Kingston	Drama	First National
French Dressing	Allan Dwan	H. B. Warner, Clive Brook, Lois Wilson	Romantic comedy	First National
Frisco Sally Levy	William Beaudine	Tenen Holtz, Kate Price, Sally O'Neil	Comedy	MGM
The Frontiersman	Reginald Barker	Tim McCoy, Claire Windsor	Western	MGM

== G ==
Title	Director	Featured Cast	Genre	Note
Galloping Fury	B. Reeves Eason	Hoot Gibson, Otis Harlan, Sally Rand	Western	Universal
The Galloping Gobs	Richard Thorpe	Jay Wilsey, Morgan Brown	Western	Pathé Exchange
Galloping Thunder	Scott Pembroke	Bob Custer, J.P. Lockney	Western	FBO
The Garden of Allah	Rex Ingram	Alice Terry, Ivan Petrovich	Romance	MGM
The Gaucho	F. Richard Jones	Douglas Fairbanks, Lupe Vélez, Eve Southern	Adventure	United Artists
The Gay Defender	Gregory La Cava	Richard Dix, Thelma Todd, Fred Kohler	Drama	Paramount
The Gay Old Bird	Herman C. Raymaker	Louise Fazenda, John T. Murray, Jane Winton	Comedy	Warner Bros.
The Gay Retreat	Benjamin Stoloff	Betty Francisco, Sammy Cohen, Holmes Herbert	Comedy	Fox Film
A Gentleman of Paris	Harry d'Abbadie d'Arrast	Adolphe Menjou, Arlette Marchal	Comedy	Paramount
Get Your Man	Dorothy Arzner	Clara Bow, Charles 'Buddy' Rogers, Josef Swickard	Comedy	Paramount
Getting Gertie's Garter	E. Mason Hopper	Marie Prevost, Charles Ray	Comedy	PDC
The Gingham Girl	David Kirkland	Lois Wilson, George K. Arthur	Comedy	FBO
Ginsberg the Great	Byron Haskin	George Jessel, Audrey Ferris, Gertrude Astor	Comedy	Warner Bros.
The Girl from Chicago	Ray Enright	Conrad Nagel, Myrna Loy	Crime drama	Warner Bros.
The Girl from Everywhere	Edward F. Cline	Daphne Pollard, Carole Lombard	Comedy	Pathé Exchange
The Girl from Gay Paree	Arthur Gregor	Lowell Sherman, Barbara Bedford, Betty Blythe	Comedy	Tiffany
The Girl from Rio	Tom Terriss	Carmel Myers, Walter Pidgeon, Mildred Harris	Romance	Gotham
The Girl in the Pullman	Erle C. Kenton	Marie Prevost, Harrison Ford, Franklin Pangborn	Comedy	Pathé Exchange
God's Great Wilderness	David Hartford	Lillian Rich, Joseph Bennett, Russell Simpson	Drama	Independent
Gold from Weepah	William Bertram	Bill Cody, Doris Dawson	Western	Pathé Exchange
Good as Gold	Scott R. Dunlap	Buck Jones, Frances Lee	Western	Fox Film
Good Time Charley	Michael Curtiz	Helene Costello, Warner Oland, Montagu Love	Drama	Warner Bros.
The Gorilla	Alfred Santell	Fred Kelsey, Alice Day, Walter Pidgeon	Thriller	First National
Great Mail Robbery	George B. Seitz	Theodore von Eltz, Jean Fenwick	Drama	FBO
Grinning Guns	Albert S. Rogell	Jack Hoxie, Ena Gregory	Western	Universal
Gun Gospel	Harry Joe Brown	Ken Maynard, Virginia Brown Faire	Western	First National Pictures
Gun-Hand Garrison	Edward Gordon	Kermit Maynard, Ruby Blaine	Western	Rayart

== H ==
Title	Director	Featured Cast	Genre	Note
Ham and Eggs at the Front	Roy Del Ruth	Tom Wilson, Heinie Conklin, Myrna Loy	Comedy	Warner Bros.
Hands Off	Ernst Laemmle	Fred Humes, Helen Foster	Western	Universal
Hard Fists	William Wyler	Art Acord, Louise Lorraine	Western	Universal
Hard-Boiled Haggerty	Charles Brabin	Milton Sills, Molly O'Day	War comedy	First National
A Harp in Hock	Renaud Hoffman	Rudolph Schildkraut, May Robson, Bessie Love	Drama	Pathé Exchange
The Harvester	James Leo Meehan	Orville Caldwell, Natalie Kingston	Comedy	FBO
The Haunted Ship	Forrest Sheldon	Dorothy Sebastian, Montagu Love, Tom Santschi	Drama	Tiffany
Hazardous Valley	Alan James	Sheldon Lewis, Virginia Brown Faire, David Torrence	Drama	Independent
The Heart of Maryland	Lloyd Bacon	Dolores Costello, Jason Robards Sr., Warner Richmond	Historical	Warner Bros.
The Heart of Salome	Victor Schertzinger	Alma Rubens, Walter Pidgeon, Holmes Herbert	Romance	Fox Film
The Heart of the Yukon	W.S. Van Dyke	John Bowers, Anne Cornwall	Adventure	Pathé Exchange
The Heart Thief	Nils Olaf Chrisander	Joseph Schildkraut, Lya De Putti	Romance	PDC
Heaven on Earth	Phil Rosen	Renee Adoree, Conrad Nagel	Drama	MGM
Held by the Law	Ernst Laemmle	Ralph Lewis, Johnnie Walker, Marguerite De La Motte	Crime	Universal
Her Father Said No	Jack McKeown	Mary Brian, Frankie Darro	Comedy	FBO
Her Wild Oat	Marshall Neilan	Colleen Moore, Larry Kent	Comedy	First National
A Hero for a Night	William James Craft	Glenn Tryon, Patsy Ruth Miller	Comedy	Universal
A Hero on Horseback	Del Andrews	Hoot Gibson, Ethlyne Clair	Western	Universal
Heroes in Blue	Duke Worne	John Bowers, Sally Rand, Gareth Hughes	Drama	Rayart
Heroes of the Night	Frank O'Connor	Cullen Landis, Marian Nixon	Drama	Gotham
Hey! Hey! Cowboy	Lynn Reynolds	Hoot Gibson, Kathleen Key	Western	Universal
Hidden Aces	Howard M. Mitchell	Charles Hutchison, Alice Calhoun	Action	Pathé Exchange
High Hat	James Ashmore Creelman	Ben Lyon, Mary Brian, Sam Hardy	Comedy	First National
High School Hero	David Butler	Nick Stuart, Sally Phipps	Comedy	Fox Film
Hills of Kentucky	Howard Bretherton	Rin Tin Tin, Jason Robards Sr., Dorothy Dwan	Drama	Warner Bros.
Hills of Peril	Lambert Hillyer	Buck Jones, Georgia Hale	Western	Fox Film
His Dog	Karl Brown	Joseph Schildkraut, Julia Faye, Sally Rand	Drama	Pathé Exchange
His First Flame	Harry Edwards	Harry Langdon, Natalie Kingston	Comedy	Pathé Exchange
His Foreign Wife	John P. McCarthy	Edna Murphy, Wallace MacDonald	Drama	Pathé Exchange
His Rise to Fame	Bernard McEveety	George Walsh, Peggy Shaw	Drama	Independent
Home Made	Charles Hines	Johnny Hines, DeWitt Jennings, Marjorie Daw	Comedy	First National
Home Struck	Ralph Ince	Viola Dana, Tom Gallery	Silent	FBO
Honeymoon Hate	Luther Reed	Florence Vidor, Tullio Carminati	Comedy	Paramount
Hoof Marks	Tenny Wright	Ed Brady, Peggy Montgomery	Western	Pathé Exchange
Hook and Ladder No. 9	F. Harmon Weight	Cornelius Keefe, Edward Hearn, Lucy Beaumont	Drama	FBO
Horse Shoes	Clyde Bruckman	Monty Banks, Jean Arthur	Comedy	Pathé Exchange
Hotel Imperial	Mauritz Stiller	Pola Negri, James Hall, George Siegmann	Drama	Paramount
Hour of Reckoning	John Ince	Herbert Rawlinson, Grace Darmond	Drama	Independent
Hula	Victor Fleming	Clara Bow, Clive Brook, Arlette Marchal	Romantic comedy	Paramount
Husband Hunters	John G. Adolfi	Mae Busch, Charles Delaney, Jean Arthur	Romantic comedy	Tiffany
Husbands for Rent	Henry Lehrman	Owen Moore, Helene Costello, Katherine Perry	Comedy	Warner Bros.

== I ==
Title	Director	Featured Cast	Genre	Note
If I Were Single	Roy Del Ruth	May McAvoy, Conrad Nagel, Myrna Loy	Comedy	Warner Bros.
In a Moment of Temptation	Philip Carle	Charlotte Stevens, Grant Withers	Drama	FBO
In Old Kentucky	John M. Stahl	Helene Costello, James Murray	Drama	MGM
In the First Degree	Phil Rosen	Alice Calhoun, Bryant Washburn		
The Interferin' Gent	Richard Thorpe	Jay Wilsey, Olive Hasbrouck	Western	Pathé Exchange
Irish Hearts	Byron Haskin	May McAvoy, Jason Robards Sr., Warner Richmond	Comedy	Warner Bros.
The Irresistible Lover	William Beaudine	Norman Kerry, Lois Moran, Gertrude Astor	Comedy	Universal
Is Zat So?	Alfred E. Green	George O'Brien, Edmund Lowe, Katherine Perry	Comedy	Fox Film
The Isle of Forgotten Women	George B. Seitz	Conway Tearle, Dorothy Sebastian	Drama	Columbia
It	Clarence G. Badger	Clara Bow, Antonio Moreno, Priscilla Bonner	Romantic comedy	Paramount

== J ==
Title	Director	Featured Cast	Genre	Note
Jake the Plumber	Edward Ludwig	Jesse De Vorska, Sharon Lynn	Comedy	FBO
Jaws of Steel	Ray Enright	Rin Tin Tin, Jason Robards Sr., Helen Ferguson	Adventure	Warner Bros.
The Jazz Singer	Alan Crosland	Al Jolson, May McAvoy, Warner Oland	Drama	Warner Bros. First feature length "talkie"; 1 Academy Award nomination and 1 Honorary Award
Jesse James	Lloyd Ingraham	Fred Thomson, Nora Lane, Montagu Love	Western	Paramount
Jewels of Desire	Paul Powell	Priscilla Dean, John Bowers	Romance	PDC
Johnny Get Your Hair Cut	B. Reeves Eason	Harry Carey, Jackie Coogan	Comedy	MGM
The Joy Girl	Allan Dwan	Olive Borden, Neil Hamilton, Marie Dressler	Comedy	Fox Film
Judgment of the Hills	James Leo Meehan	Virginia Valli, Frankie Darro	Drama	FBO

== K ==
Title	Director	Featured Cast	Genre	Note
The Kid Brother	Lewis Milestone, J. A. Howe, Ted Wilde	Harold Lloyd	Comedy	Paramount
The Kid Sister	Ralph Graves	Marguerite De La Motte, Malcolm McGregor	Drama	Columbia
The King of Kings	Cecil B. DeMille	H. B. Warner, Dorothy Cumming, Joseph Schildkraut	Biblical drama	PDC
A Kiss in a Taxi	Clarence G. Badger	Bebe Daniels, Chester Conklin	Comedy	Paramount
Knockout Reilly	Malcolm St. Clair	Richard Dix, Mary Brian	Drama	Paramount

== L ==
Title	Director	Featured Cast	Genre	Note
Ladies at Ease	Jerome Storm	Pauline Garon, Gertrude Short	Comedy	Independent
Ladies Beware	Charles Giblyn	George O'Hara, Nola Luxford	Crime	FBO
Ladies Must Dress	Victor Heerman	Virginia Valli, Lawrence Gray	Comedy	Fox Film
The Lady in Ermine	James Flood	Corinne Griffith, Francis X. Bushman	Romantic Drama	First National
The Ladybird	Walter Lang	Betty Compson, Malcolm McGregor	Crime	Independent
The Laffin' Fool	Bennett Cohen	Jack Perrin, Pauline Curley	Western	Rayart
The Land Beyond the Law	Harry Joe Brown	Ken Maynard, Dorothy Dwan	Western	First National
Land of the Lawless	Tom Buckingham	Tom Santschi, Charles Clary	Western	Pathé Exchange
The Last Outlaw	Arthur Rosson	Gary Cooper, Jack Luden	Western	Paramount
The Last Trail	Lewis Seiler	Tom Mix, Carmelita Geraghty	Western	Fox Film
Legionnaires in Paris	Arvid E. Gillstrom	Kit Guard, Louise Lorraine	Comedy	FBO
Let It Rain	Edward F. Cline	Douglas MacLean, Shirley Mason	Comedy	Paramount
Life of an Actress	Jack Nelson	Barbara Bedford, Lydia Knott	Drama	Independent
The Life of Riley	William Beaudine	George Sidney, June Marlowe	Comedy	First National
A Light in the Window	Scott Pembroke	Henry B. Walthall, Cornelius Keefe	Drama	Rayart
Lightning	James C. McKay	Jobyna Ralston, Robert Frazer, Margaret Livingston	Action	Tiffany
Lightning Lariats	Robert De Lacey	Tom Tyler, Dorothy Dunbar, Frankie Darro	Western	FBO
The Little Adventuress	William C. de Mille	Vera Reynolds, Phyllis Haver	Comedy	PDC
A Little Journey	Robert Z. Leonard	Claire Windsor, William Haines, Harry Carey	Comedy	MGM
Little Mickey Grogan	James Leo Meehan	Frankie Darro, Jobyna Ralston	Comedy	FBO
Loco Luck	Clifford Smith	Art Acord, Fay Wray	Western	Universal
London After Midnight	Tod Browning	Lon Chaney, Marceline Day, Conrad Nagel	Thriller	MGM
The Lone Eagle	Emory Johnson	Barbara Kent, Nigel Barrie	Drama	Universal
Lonesome Ladies	Joseph Henabery	Lewis Stone, Anna Q. Nilsson	Comedy	First National
The Long Loop on the Pecos	Leo D. Maloney	Eugenia Gilbert, Leo D. Maloney	Western	Pathé Exchange
Long Pants	Frank Capra	Harry Langdon, Gladys Brockwell, Betty Francisco	Comedy	First National
Lost at the Front	Del Lord	George Sidney, Natalie Kingston	Comedy	First National
The Lost Limited	J.P. McGowan	Reed Howes, Ruth Dwyer	Action	Rayart
Love	Edmund Goulding	John Gilbert, Greta Garbo	Drama	MGM
Love Makes 'Em Wild	Albert Ray	John Harron, Sally Phipps	Comedy	Fox Film
The Love of Sunya	Albert Parker	Gloria Swanson, John Boles	Drama	United Artists
The Love Mart	George Fitzmaurice	Billie Dove, Gilbert Roland, Noah Beery	Drama	First National
The Love Thrill	Millard Webb	Laura La Plante, Tom Moore, Bryant Washburn	Comedy	Universal
The Lovelorn	John P. McCarthy	Sally O'Neil, Molly O'Day, Larry Kent	Drama	MGM
Lovers	John M. Stahl	Ramon Novarro, Alice Terry	Romantic Drama	MGM
Love's Greatest Mistake	A. Edward Sutherland	Evelyn Brent, William Powell, James Hall	Drama	Paramount
The Loves of Carmen	Raoul Walsh	Dolores del Río, Victor McLaglen, Don Alvarado	Romance	Fox Film; Remake of 1948 film
The Lunatic at Large	Fred C. Newmeyer	Leon Errol, Dorothy Mackaill	Comedy	First National
Lure of the Night Club	Tom Buckingham	Viola Dana, Robert Ellis	Drama	FBO

== M ==
Title	Director	Featured Cast	Genre	Note
A Made-To-Order Hero	Edgar Lewis	Ted Wells, Marjorie Bonner	Western	Universal
The Magic Flame	Henry King	Ronald Colman, Vilma Banky, Agostino Borgato	Drama	United Artists. 1 Academy Award nominations
The Magic Garden	James Leo Meehan	Margaret Morris, Raymond Keane	Drama	FBO
The Main Event	William K. Howard	Vera Reynolds, Rudolph Schildkraut	Drama	Pathé Exchange
Man Bait	Donald Crisp	Marie Prevost, Douglas Fairbanks Jr.	Comedy	PDC
Man Crazy	John Francis Dillon	Dorothy Mackaill, Jack Mulhall, Edythe Chapman	Comedy	First National
The Man from Hard Pan	Leo D. Maloney	Leo D. Maloney, Eugenia Gilbert	Western	Pathé Exchange
Man Power	Clarence G. Badger	Richard Dix, Mary Brian	Comedy	Paramount
Man, Woman and Sin	Monta Bell	Jeanne Eagels, John Gilbert, Gladys Brockwell	Drama	MGM
A Man's Past	George Melford	Conrad Veidt, Barbara Bedford	Drama	Universal
Marriage	Roy William Neill	Virginia Valli, Gladys McConnell	Drama	Fox Film
Married Alive	Emmett J. Flynn	Lou Tellegen, Margaret Livingston, Claire Adams	Comedy	Fox Film
The Masked Woman	Silvano Balboni	Anna Q. Nilsson, Holbrook Blinn	Drama	First National
Matinee Ladies	Byron Haskin	May McAvoy, Malcolm McGregor, Hedda Hopper	Comedy	Warner Bros.
McFadden's Flats	Richard Wallace	Charles Murray, Chester Conklin, Edna Murphy	Comedy	First National
The Meddlin' Stranger	Richard Thorpe	Wally Wales, Nola Luxford	Western	Pathé Exchange
Men of Daring	Albert S. Rogell	Jack Hoxie, Ena Gregory, Marin Sais	Western	Universal
The Midnight Watch	Charles J. Hunt	Roy Stewart, Mary McAllister, David Torrence	Crime	Rayart
A Million Bid	Michael Curtiz	Dolores Costello, Warner Oland, Betty Blythe	Drama	Warner Bros.
Million Dollar Mystery	Charles J. Hunt	James Kirkwood, Lila Lee	Mystery	Rayart
The Missing Link	Charles Reisner	Syd Chaplin, Ruth Hiatt	Comedy	Warner Bros.
Mockery	Benjamin Christensen	Lon Chaney, Barbara Bedford, Ricardo Cortez	Drama	MGM
Modern Daughters	Charles J. Hunt	Edna Murphy, Bryant Washburn	Drama	Rayart
The Mojave Kid	Robert N. Bradbury	Bob Steele, Buck Connors	Western	FBO
The Monkey Talks	Raoul Walsh	Olive Borden, Don Alvarado	Drama	Fox Film
Mother	James Leo Meehan	Belle Bennett, Crauford Kent	Drama	FBO
Mountains of Manhattan	James P. Hogan	Dorothy Devore, Charles Delaney, Kate Price	Drama	Gotham
Mr. Wu	William Nigh	Lon Chaney, Louise Dresser, Renée Adorée	Drama	MGM
The Music Master	Allan Dwan	Alec B. Francis, Lois Moran, Neil Hamilton	Drama	Fox Film
My Best Girl	Sam Taylor	Mary Pickford, Buddy Rogers	Romantic comedy	United Artists
My Friend from India	E. Mason Hopper	Franklin Pangborn, Elinor Fair	Comedy	Pathé Exchange
The Mysterious Rider	John Waters	Jack Holt, David Torrence	Western	Paramount

== N ==
Title	Director	Featured Cast	Genre	Note
Naughty but Nice	Millard Webb	Colleen Moore, Donald Reed	Comedy	First National
Naughty Nanette	James Leo Meehan	Viola Dana, Patricia Palmer	Comedy	FBO
The Nest	William Nigh	Pauline Frederick, Holmes Herbert	Drama	Independent
Nevada	John Waters	Gary Cooper, Thelma Todd, William Powell	Western	Paramount
New York	Luther Reed	Ricardo Cortez, Lois Wilson, William Powell	Drama	Paramount
The Night Bride	E. Mason Hopper	Marie Prevost, Harrison Ford, Franklin Pangborn	Comedy	PDC
Night Life	George Archainbaud	Alice Day, John Harron	Drama	First National
The Night of Love	George Fitzmaurice	Ronald Colman, Vilma Bánky, Montagu Love	Drama	United Artists
Nobody's Widow	Donald Crisp	Leatrice Joy, Phyllis Haver	Comedy	PDC
No Control	Scott Sidney	Harrison Ford, Phyllis Haver	Comedy	PDC
No Man's Law	Fred Jackman	Barbara Kent, James Finlayson, Oliver Hardy	Western comedy	Pathé Exchange
No Place to Go	Mervyn LeRoy	Mary Astor, Lloyd Hughes	Romance	First National
Not for Publication	Ralph Ince	Ralph Ince, Rex Lease	Silent	FBO
The Notorious Lady	King Baggot	Barbara Bedford, Lewis Stone, Ann Rork	Drama	First National
Now We're in the Air	Frank R. Strayer	Wallace Beery, Raymond Hatton, Louise Brooks	Comedy	Paramount

== O ==
Title	Director	Featured Cast	Genre	Note
The Obligin' Buckaroo	Richard Thorpe	Jay Wilsey, Olive Hasbrouck	Western	Pathé Exchange
Old San Francisco	Alan Crosland	Dolores Costello, Josef Swickard, Anders Randolf	Historical drama	Warner Bros.
On the Stroke of Twelve	Charles J. Hunt	David Torrence, June Marlowe	Drama	Rayart
On Your Toes	Fred C. Newmeyer	Reginald Denny, Barbara Worth	Comedy	Universal
On Ze Boulevard	Harry F. Millarde	Lew Cody, Renée Adorée	Comedy	MGM
Once and Forever	Phil Goldstone	Patsy Ruth Miller, John Harron, Burr McIntosh	Romance	Tiffany
One Chance in a Million	Noel M. Smith	William Fairbanks, Viora Daniel, Charles K. French	Crime	Independent
One Glorious Scrap	Edgar Lewis	Fred Humes, Dorothy Gulliver	Western	Universal
One Hour of Love	Robert Florey	Jacqueline Logan, Robert Frazer, Montagu Love	Romance	Tiffany
One Increasing Purpose	Harry Beaumont	Edmund Lowe, Lila Lee, Holmes Herbert	Drama	Fox Film
A One Man Game	Ernst Laemmle	Fred Humes, Fay Wray	Western	Universal
One-Round Hogan	Howard Bretherton	Monte Blue, Leila Hyams	Drama	Warner Bros.
One Woman to Another	Frank Tuttle	Florence Vidor, Theodore von Eltz	Comedy	Paramount
Open Range	Clifford Smith	Betty Bronson, Lane Chandler, Fred Kohler	Western	Paramount
The Opening Night	Edward H. Griffith	Claire Windsor, John Bowers	Drama	Columbia
Orchids and Ermine	Alfred Santell	Colleen Moore, Jack Mulhall	Comedy	First National
Out All Night	William A. Seiter	Reginald Denny, Marian Nixon	Comedy	Universal
The Overland Stage	Albert S. Rogell	Ken Maynard, Kathleen Collins	Western	First National
Out of the Past	Dallas M. Fitzgerald	Robert Frazer, Mildred Harris, Joyzelle Joyner	Drama	Independent
The Outlaw Dog	J. P. McGowan	Helen Foster, Rex Lease	Drama	FBO
Outlaws of Red River	Lewis Seiler	Tom Mix, Marjorie Daw	Western	Fox Film

== P ==
Title	Director	Featured Cast	Genre	Note
Paid to Love	Howard Hawks	George O'Brien, Virginia Valli	Comedy	Fox Film
Painted Ponies	B. Reeves Eason	Hoot Gibson, Ethlyne Clair	Western	Universal
Painting the Town	William James Craft	Glenn Tryon, Patsy Ruth Miller, Charles K. Gerrard	Comedy	Universal
Pajamas	John G. Blystone	Olive Borden, Lawrence Gray	Comedy	Fox Film
Pals in Peril	Richard Thorpe	Jay Wilsey, Olive Hasbrouck	Western	Pathé Exchange
Paradise for Two	Gregory La Cava	Richard Dix, Betty Bronson, Edmund Breese	Romantic comedy	Paramount
The Patent Leather Kid	Alfred Santell	Richard Barthelmess, Molly O'Day	Drama	First National. 1 Academy Award nomination
Paying the Price	David Selman	Marjorie Bonner, Priscilla Bonner, John Miljan	Crime	Columbia
Perch of the Devil	King Baggot	Mae Busch, Pat O'Malley, Jane Winton	Drama	Universal
The Perfect Sap	Howard Higgin	Ben Lyon, Virginia Lee Corbin	Comedy	First National
The Phantom Buster	William Bertram	Buddy Roosevelt, Alma Rayford	Action	Pathé Exchange
Play Safe	Joseph Henabery	Monty Banks, Virginia Lee Corbin, Charles K. Gerrard	Comedy	Pathé Exchange
Pleasure Before Business	Frank R. Strayer	Pat O'Malley, Virginia Brown Faire	Comedy	Columbia
Polly of the Movies	Scott Pembroke	Jason Robards Sr., Gertrude Short, Stuart Holmes	Comedy	Independent
Poor Girls	William James Craft	Dorothy Revier, Edmund Burns	Drama	Columbia
The Poor Nut	Richard Wallace	Jack Mulhall, Jean Arthur	Comedy	First National
The Potters	Fred C. Newmeyer	W. C. Fields, Mary Alden	Comedy	Paramount
The Prairie King	B. Reeves Eason	Hoot Gibson, Barbara Worth	Western	Universal
Pretty Clothes	Phil Rosen	Jobyna Ralston, Gertrude Astor	Drama	Independent
The Price of Honor	Edward H. Griffith	Dorothy Revier, Malcolm McGregor	Drama	Columbia
The Prince of Headwaiters	John Francis Dillon	Lewis Stone, Priscilla Bonner, Lilyan Tashman	Drama	First National
The Princess from Hoboken	Allen Dale	Edmund Burns, Blanche Mehaffey	Comedy	Tiffany
The Princess on Broadway	Dallas M. Fitzgerald	Pauline Garon, Dorothy Dwan, Johnnie Walker	Comedy	Pathé Exchange
The Private Life of Helen of Troy	Alexander Korda	Maria Corda, Lewis Stone, Ricardo Cortez	Comedy	First National. 1 Academy Award nomination
Publicity Madness	Albert Ray	Lois Moran, Edmund Lowe	Comedy	Fox Film

== Q ==
Title	Director	Featured Cast	Genre	Note
Quality Street	Sidney Franklin	Marion Davies, Conrad Nagel	Romance	MGM
Quarantined Rivals	Archie Mayo	Robert Agnew, Kathleen Collins, John Miljan	Romantic comedy	Independent

== R ==
Title	Director	Featured Cast	Genre	Note
The Racing Fool	Harry Joe Brown	Reed Howes, Ruth Dwyer	Action	Rayart
A Racing Romeo	Sam Wood	Red Grange, Jobyna Ralston	Comedy	FBO
Ragtime	Scott Pembroke	John Bowers, Marguerite De La Motte	Drama	Independent
The Rambling Ranger	Dell Henderson	Jack Hoxie, Dorothy Gulliver	Western	Universal
Range Courage	Ernst Laemmle	Fred Humes, Gloria Grey	Western	Universal
The Range Riders	Ben F. Wilson	Neva Gerber, Al Ferguson	Western	Rayart
Ranger of the North	Jerome Storm	Hugh Trevor, Lina Basquette	Western	FBO
Red Clay	Ernst Laemmle	William Desmond, Marceline Day	Drama	Universal
The Red Mill	Fatty Arbuckle	Marion Davies, Owen Moore	Comedy	MGM
The Red Raiders	Albert S. Rogell	Ken Maynard, Paul Hurst	Western	First National
Red Signals	J.P. McGowan	Earle Williams, Eva Novak	Action	Independent
The Rejuvenation of Aunt Mary	Erle C. Kenton	May Robson, Harrison Ford, Phyllis Haver	Comedy	PDC
A Reno Divorce	Ralph Graves	May McAvoy, Ralph Graves	Romance	Warner Bros.
Resurrection	Edwin Carewe	Dolores del Río, Rod La Rocque	Drama	United Artists
The Return of Boston Blackie	Harry O. Hoyt	Corliss Palmer, Bob Custer	Crime	Independent
Rich But Honest	Albert Ray	John Holland, Charles Morton, Marjorie Beebe	Comedy	Fox Film
Rich Men's Sons	Ralph Graves	Ralph Graves, Shirley Mason	Drama	Columbia
Ride 'em High	Richard Thorpe	Buddy Roosevelt, Olive Hasbrouck	Western	Pathé Exchange
Rider of the Law	Paul Hurst	Al Hoxie, Ione Reed, Cliff Lyons	Western	Independent
Ridin' Luck	Edward R. Gordon	Kermit Maynard, Ruby Blaine	Western	Rayart
The Ridin' Rowdy	Richard Thorpe	Jay Wilsey, Olive Hasbrouck	Western	Pathé Exchange
Riding to Fame	Barry Barringer	George Fawcett, Rosemary Theby, Gladys McConnell	Drama	Independent
Ritzy	Richard Rosson	Betty Bronson, James Hall, William Austin	Comedy	Paramount
The Road to Romance	John S. Robertson	Ramon Novarro, Marceline Day, Roy D'Arcy	Drama	MGM
Roarin' Broncs	Richard Thorpe	Jay Wilsey, Lafe McKee	Western	Pathé Exchange
Roaring Fires	Barry Barringer	Roy Stewart, Alice Lake, Lionel Belmore	Drama	Independent
Rolled Stockings	Richard Rosson	James Hall, Louise Brooks, Richard Arlen	Drama	Paramount
The Romantic Age	Robert Florey	Eugene O'Brien, Alberta Vaughn	Drama	Columbia
Romantic Rogue	Harry Joe Brown	Reed Howes, Ena Gregory	Comedy	Rayart
Rookies	Sam Wood	Karl Dane, George K. Arthur, Marceline Day	Comedy	MGM
The Rose of Kildare	Dallas M. Fitzgerald	Helene Chadwick, Pat O'Malley, Henry B. Walthall	Romance	Gotham
Rose of the Bowery	Bertram Bracken	Edna Murphy, Johnnie Walker, Crauford Kent	Crime	Independent
Rose of the Golden West	George Fitzmaurice	Mary Astor, Gilbert Roland, Montagu Love	Drama	First National
Rough and Ready	Albert S. Rogell	Jack Hoxie, Ena Gregory	Western	Universal
Rough House Rosie	Frank R. Strayer	Clara Bow, Reed Howes, Doris Hill	Comedy	Paramount
The Rough Riders	Victor Fleming	Noah Beery, Charles Farrell, George Bancroft, Mary Astor	Adventure	Paramount
The Royal American	Harry Joe Brown	Reed Howes, Billy Franey	Adventure	Rayart
Rubber Heels	Victor Heerman	Ed Wynn, Thelma Todd	Comedy	Paramount
Rubber Tires	Alan Hale	Bessie Love, Harrison Ford	Comedy	PDC
Running Wild	Gregory La Cava	W. C. Fields, Mary Brian	Comedy	Paramount

== S ==
Title	Director	Featured Cast	Genre	Note
Sailor Izzy Murphy	Henry Lehrman	George Jessel, Audrey Ferris, Warner Oland	Comedy	Warner Bros.
A Sailor's Sweetheart	Lloyd Bacon	Louise Fazenda, Clyde Cook, Myrna Loy	Comedy	Warner Bros.
Sally in Our Alley	Walter Lang	Shirley Mason, Richard Arlen	Comedy drama	Columbia
Salvation Jane	Phil Rosen	Viola Dana, J. Parks Jones	Crime	FBO
The Satin Woman	Walter Lang	Dorothy Davenport, Rockliffe Fellowes, Alice White	Drama	Gotham
Say It with Diamonds	Arthur Gregor	Betty Compson, Earle Williams	Drama	Independent
The Scar of Shame	The Scar of Shame	Harry Henderson and Lucia Lynn Moses	Race film	
The Scorcher	Harry Joe Brown	Reed Howes, Thelma Parr, Hank Mann	Action	Rayart
Shanghaied	Ralph Ince	Patsy Ruth Miller, Gertrude Astor	Silent	FBO
The Sea Tiger	John Francis Dillon	Milton Sills, Mary Astor, Alice White	Drama	First National
The Secret Studio	Victor Schertzinger	Olive Borden, John Holland	Drama	Fox Film
See You in Jail	Joseph Henabery	Jack Mulhall, Alice Day, Crauford Kent	Comedy	First National
Senorita	Clarence G. Badger	Bebe Daniels, James Hall	Comedy	Paramount
Sensation Seekers	Lois Weber	Billie Dove, Huntley Gordon	Romance	Universal
Serenade	Harry d'Abbadie d'Arrast	Adolphe Menjou, Kathryn Carver	Drama	Paramount
Service for Ladies	Harry d'Abbadie d'Arrast	Adolphe Menjou, Kathryn Carver	Comedy	Paramount
Set Free	Arthur Rosson	Art Acord, Olive Hasbrouck	Western	Universal
The Shamrock and the Rose	Jack Nelson	Mack Swain, Olive Hasbrouck, Edmund Burns	Comedy	Independent
Shanghai Bound	Luther Reed	Richard Dix, Mary Brian	Adventure	Paramount
Shanghaied	Ralph Ince	Patsy Ruth Miller, Gertrude Astor	Drama	FBO
She's a Sheik	Clarence G. Badger	Bebe Daniels, Richard Arlen, William Powell	Comedy	Paramount
She's My Baby	Fred Windemere	Kathleen Myers, Earle Williams, Mildred Harris	Comedy	Independent
Shootin' Irons	Richard Rosson	Jack Luden, Sally Blane	Western	Paramount
The Show	Tod Browning	John Gilbert, Renee Adoree, Lionel Barrymore	Drama	MGM
The Show Girl	Charles J. Hunt	Mildred Harris, Gaston Glass	Drama	Rayart
The Silent Avenger	James P. Hogan	Charles Delaney, Duane Thompson	Action	Gotham
The Silent Hero	Duke Worne	Robert Frazer, Edna Murphy	Action	Rayart
The Silent Rider	Lynn Reynolds	Hoot Gibson, Blanche Mehaffey, Ethan Laidlaw	Western	Universal
Silk Legs	Arthur Rosson	Madge Bellamy, James Hall	Comedy	Fox Film
Silk Stockings	Wesley Ruggles	Laura La Plante, John Harron	Comedy	Universal
Silver Comes Through	Lloyd Ingraham	Fred Thomson, Edna Murphy	Western	FBO
The Silver Slave	Howard Bretherton	Irene Rich, Audrey Ferris, Holmes Herbert	Drama	Warner Bros.
Silver Valley	Benjamin Stoloff	Tom Mix, Dorothy Dwan	Action	Fox Film
Simple Sis	Herman C. Raymaker	Louise Fazenda, Clyde Cook, Myrna Loy	Comedy drama	Warner Bros.
Sinews of Steel	Frank O'Connor	Alberta Vaughn, Gaston Glass, Anders Randolf	Drama	Gotham
Singed	John Griffith Wray	Blanche Sweet, Warner Baxter	Drama	Fox Film
The Siren	Byron Haskin	Tom Moore, Dorothy Revier	Drama	Columbia
Skedaddle Gold	Richard Thorpe	Hal Taliaferro, Bob Burns	Western	Pathé Exchange
Slaves of Beauty	John G. Blystone	Olive Tell, Holmes Herbert, Earle Foxe	Comedy drama	Fox Film
Slide, Kelly, Slide	Edward Sedgwick	William Haines, Sally O'Neil	Comedy	MGM
Slightly Used	Archie Mayo	May McAvoy, Conrad Nagel, Robert Agnew	Comedy	Warner Bros.
The Slingshot Kid	Louis King	Buzz Barton, Jean Fenwick	Western	FBO
The Small Bachelor	William A. Seiter	Barbara Kent, George Beranger	Comedy	Universal
Smile, Brother, Smile	John Francis Dillon	Jack Mulhall, Dorothy Mackaill, Philo McCullough	Comedy	First National
Smiling Billy	Duke Worne	Billy Sullivan, Armida, Jimmy Aubrey	Action	Rayart
The Snarl of Hate	Noel M. Smith	Johnnie Walker, Mildred June, Jack Richardson	Drama	Independent
Snowbound	Phil Goldstone	Betty Blythe, Robert Agnew	Comedy	Tiffany
The Soda Water Cowboy	Richard Thorpe	Hal Taliaferro, Slim Whitaker	Western	Pathé Exchange
Soft Cushions	Edward F. Cline	Douglas MacLean, Sue Carol	Comedy	Paramount
Somewhere in Sonora	Albert S. Rogell	Ken Maynard, Kathleen Collins	Western	First National
The Sonora Kid	Robert De Lacey	Tom Tyler, Peggy Montgomery, Billie Bennett	Western	FBO
Sorrell and Son	Herbert Brenon	H. B. Warner, Anna Q. Nilsson, Louis Wolheim, Alice Joyce, Nils Asther, Mary Nolan	Drama	United Artists. Academy Award for Best Directing nominee
South Sea Love	Ralph Ince	Patsy Ruth Miller, Lee Shumway	Drama	FBO
Special Delivery	Fatty Arbuckle	Eddie Cantor, Jobyna Ralston, William Powell	Comedy	Paramount
Speeding Hoofs	Louis Chaudet	Dick Hatton, Elsa Benham	Western	Rayart
Speedy Smith	Duke Worne	Billy Sullivan, Hazel Deane	Sports	Rayart
Splitting the Breeze	Robert De Lacey	Tom Tyler, Harry Woods	Western	FBO
Spoilers of the West	W. S. Van Dyke	Tim McCoy, Marjorie Daw	Western	MGM
The Spotlight	Frank Tuttle	Esther Ralston, Neil Hamilton	Comedy	Paramount
Spring Fever	Edward Sedgwick	William Haines, Joan Crawford	Romance	MGM
Spuds	Edward Ludwig	Larry Semon, Dorothy Dwan	Comedy	Pathé Exchange
Spurs and Saddles	Clifford Smith	Art Acord, Fay Wray	Western	Universal
Stage Kisses	Albert H. Kelley	Kenneth Harlan, Helene Chadwick	Drama	Columbia
Stage Madness	Victor Schertzinger	Virginia Valli, Tullio Carminati	Drama	Fox Film
The Stolen Bride	Alexander Korda	Billie Dove, Lloyd Hughes	Drama	First National
Stolen Pleasures	Phil Rosen	Helene Chadwick, Gayne Whitman	Drama	Columbia
Straight Shootin'	William Wyler	Ted Wells, Lillian Gilmore	Western	Universal
Stranded	Phil Rosen	Shirley Mason, William Collier Jr.		
Streets of Shanghai	Louis J. Gasnier	Pauline Starke, Kenneth Harlan, Eddie Gribbon	Drama	Tiffany
The Student Prince in Old Heidelberg	Ernst Lubitsch	Ramon Novarro, Norma Shearer, Gustav von Seyffertitz	Romantic Comedy	MGM
Sunrise: A Song of Two Humans	F. W. Murnau	George O'Brien, Janet Gaynor	Melodrama	4 Academy Award nominations
The Sunset Derby	Albert S. Rogell	Mary Astor, William Collier Jr.	Drama	First National
Surrender	Edward Sloman	Mary Philbin, Ivan Mozzhukhin	Drama	Universal
The Swell-Head	Ralph Graves	Johnnie Walker, Eugenia Gilbert	Action	Columbia
The Swift Shadow	Jerome Storm	Sam Nelson, Milburn Morante	Action	FBO
Swim Girl, Swim	Clarence G. Badger	Bebe Daniels, James Hall	Comedy	Paramount

== T ==
Title	Director	Featured Cast	Genre	Note
Tarzan and the Golden Lion	J.P. McGowan	James Pierce, Dorothy Dunbar, Edna Murphy	Adventure	FBO
The Taxi Dancer	Harry F. Millarde	Joan Crawford, Owen Moore	Comedy	MGM
Taxi! Taxi!	Melville W. Brown	Edward Everett Horton, Marian Nixon, Burr McIntosh	Comedy	Universal
Tea for Three	Robert Z. Leonard	Lew Cody, Aileen Pringle, Owen Moore	Comedy	MGM
Tearin' Into Trouble	Richard Thorpe	Hal Taliaferro, Olive Hasbrouck, Walter Brennan	Western	Pathé Exchange
The Telephone Girl	Herbert Brenon	Madge Bellamy, Holbrook Blinn, Warner Baxter	Drama	Paramount
Tell It to Sweeney	Gregory La Cava	Chester Conklin, George Bancroft	Comedy	Paramount
Temptations of a Shop Girl	Tom Terriss	Betty Compson, Pauline Garon	Drama	Independent
Ten Modern Commandments	Dorothy Arzner	Esther Ralston, Neil Hamilton	Comedy	Paramount
The Tender Hour	George Fitzmaurice	Billie Dove, Ben Lyon, Montagu Love	Romance	First National
The Terror of Bar X	Scott Pembroke	Bob Custer, Ruby Blaine	Western	FBO
A Texas Steer	Richard Wallace	Will Rogers, Louise Fazenda, Ann Rork	Comedy	First National
The Thirteenth Hour	Chester M. Franklin	Lionel Barrymore, Jacqueline Gadsdon	Mystery	MGM
The Thirteenth Juror	Edward Laemmle	Anna Q. Nilsson, Francis X. Bushman, Walter Pidgeon	Mystery	Universal
Three Hours	James Flood	Corinne Griffith, John Bowers, Hobart Bosworth	Drama	First National
Three Miles Up	Bruce M. Mitchell	Al Wilson, Ethlyne Clair	Action	Universal
Three's a Crowd	Harry Langdon	Harry Langdon, Gladys McConnell, Cornelius Keefe	Comedy	First National
The Thrill Seekers	Harry Revier	Ruth Clifford, Gloria Grey, Robert McKim	Drama	Independent
Through Thick and Thin	B. Reeves Eason	William Fairbanks, Ethel Shannon, George Periolat	Crime	Gotham
Thumbs Down	Phil Rosen	Creighton Hale, Wyndham Standing	Drama	Independent
Thunderbolt's Tracks	J. P. McGowan	Jack Perrin, Pauline Curley	Western	Rayart
The Tigress	George B. Seitz	Jack Holt, Dorothy Revier	Drama	Columbia
Tillie the Toiler	Hobart Henley	Marion Davies, Matt Moore, George K. Arthur	Comedy	MGM
Time to Love	Frank Tuttle	Raymond Griffith, William Powell, Vera Voronina	Comedy	Paramount
The Tired Business Man	Allen Dale	Raymond Hitchcock, Dot Farley, Margaret Quimby	Comedy	Tiffany
Tom's Gang	Robert De Lacey	Tom Tyler, Sharon Lynn, Frankie Darro	Western	FBO
Tongues of Scandal	Roy Clements	Mae Busch, William Desmond, Ray Hallor	Drama	Independent
Too Many Crooks	Fred C. Newmeyer	Mildred Davis, Lloyd Hughes	Comedy	Paramount
Topsy and Eva	Del Lord	Rosetta Duncan, Vivian Duncan, Gibson Gowland	Comedy	United Artists
Tracked by the Police	Ray Enright	Rin Tin Tin, Jason Robards Sr., Virginia Browne Faire	Adventure	Warner Bros.
Tumbling River	Lewis Seiler	Tom Mix, Dorothy Dwan	Western	Fox Film
Turkish Delight	Paul Sloane	Julia Faye, Rudolph Schildkraut	Comedy	PDC
Twelve Miles Out	Jack Conway	John Gilbert, Joan Crawford, Paulette Duval	Adventure	MGM
Two Arabian Knights	Lewis Milestone	William Boyd, Mary Astor, Louis Wolheim, Ian Keith	Comedy Adventure	United Artists. 1 Academy Award nomination
Two Flaming Youths	John Waters	W. C. Fields, Chester Conklin, Mary Brian	Comedy	Paramount
Two Girls Wanted	Alfred E. Green	Janet Gaynor, Glenn Tryon	Comedy	Fox Film
Two-Gun of the Tumbleweed	Leo D. Maloney	Josephine Hill, Lew Meehan	Western	Pathé Exchange

== U ==
Title	Director	Featured Cast	Genre	Note
Uncle Tom's Cabin	Harry A. Pollard	Margarita Fischer, Arthur Edmund Carewe, George Siegmann	Drama	Universal
The Understanding Heart	Jack Conway	Joan Crawford, Rockliffe Fellowes, Carmel Myers	Drama	MGM
Underworld	Josef von Sternberg	George Bancroft, Evelyn Brent, Clive Brook	Crime	Paramount. 1 Academy Award nomination
Uneasy Payments	David Kirkland	Alberta Vaughn, Gino Corrado, Betty Francisco	Comedy	FBO
The Unknown	Tod Browning	Lon Chaney, Joan Crawford	Horror	MGM
Upstream	John Ford	Nancy Nash, Earle Foxe	Comedy	Fox Film

== V ==
Title	Director	Featured Cast	Genre	Note
Vanity	Donald Crisp	Leatrice Joy, Alan Hale	Drama	PDC
The Valley of Hell	Clifford Smith	Francis McDonald, Edna Murphy	Western	MGM
The Valley of the Giants	Charles Brabin	Milton Sills, Doris Kenyon	Adventure	First National
Venus of Venice	Marshall Neilan	Constance Talmadge, Antonio Moreno, Hedda Hopper	Comedy	First National
Very Confidential	James Tinling	Madge Bellamy, Mary Duncan	Comedy	Fox Film

== W ==
Title	Director	Featured Cast	Genre	Note
Wages of Conscience	John Ince	Herbert Rawlinson, Grace Darmond	Drama	Independent
Wandering Girls	Ralph Ince	Dorothy Revier, Eugenie Besserer	Silent	Columbia
The War Horse	Lambert Hillyer	Buck Jones, Lola Todd	War drama	Fox Film
The Warning	George B. Seitz	Jack Holt, Dorothy Revier	Action	Columbia
The Way of All Flesh	Victor Fleming	Emil Jannings, Belle Bennett, Phyllis Haver	Melodrama	Paramount. 1 Academy Award nomination
Web of Fate	Dallas M. Fitzgerald	Lillian Rich, John Cossar	Drama	Independent
Wedding Bills	Erle C. Kenton	Raymond Griffith, Hallam Cooley	Comedy	Paramount
We're All Gamblers	James Cruze	Thomas Meighan, Marietta Millner, Cullen Landis	Drama	Paramount
West Point	Edward Sedgwick	William Haines, Joan Crawford	Drama	MGM
Western Courage	Ben F. Wilson	Dick Hatton, Elsa Benham	Western	Rayart
The Western Rover	Albert S. Rogell	Art Acord, Ena Gregory	Western	Universal
The Western Whirlwind	Albert S. Rogell	Jack Hoxie, Margaret Quimby	Western	Universal
What Every Girl Should Know	Charles Reisner	Patsy Ruth Miller, Ian Keith, Carroll Nye	Romance	Warner Bros.
What Happened to Father?	John G. Adolfi	Warner Oland, Florence Fair, William Demarest	Comedy	Warner Bros.
The Wheel of Destiny	Duke Worne	Forrest Stanley, Georgia Hale, Miss DuPont	Drama	Rayart
When a Dog Loves	J. P. McGowan	Harold Goodwin, Helen Foster	Drama	FBO
When a Man Loves	Alan Crosland	John Barrymore, Dolores Costello, Warner Oland	Historical drama	Warner Bros.
When Danger Calls	Charles Hutchison	William Fairbanks, Eileen Sedgwick, Ethan Laidlaw	Thriller	Gotham
When Seconds Count	Oscar Apfel	Billy Sullivan, Mildred June	Drama	Rayart
Where North Holds Sway	Bennett Cohen	Jack Perrin, Pauline Curley	Action	Rayart
Where Trails Begin	Noel M. Smith	Johnnie Walker, Charlotte Stevens, Albert J. Smith (actor)	Drama	Independent
The Whirlwind of Youth	Rowland V. Lee	Lois Moran, Vera Veronina	Drama	Paramount
Whispering Sage	Scott R. Dunlap	Buck Jones, Natalie Joyce	Western	Fox Film
White Flannels	Lloyd Bacon	Virginia Brown, Louise Dresser, Jason Robards Sr.	Melodrama	Warner Bros.
White Gold	William K. Howard	Jetta Goudal, George Bancroft	Western	PDC
White Pants Willie	Charles Hines	Johnny Hines, Leila Hyams	Comedy	First National
White Pebbles	Richard Thorpe	Hal Taliaferro, Olive Hasbrouck	Western	Pathé Exchange
Wild Beauty	Henry MacRae	June Marlowe, June Marlowe	Western	Universal
Wild Born	Edward R. Gordon	Kermit Maynard, Ruby Blaine	Western	Rayart
Wild Geese	Phil Goldstone	Belle Bennett, Russell Simpson, Eve Southern	Drama	Tiffany
Wilful Youth	Dallas M. Fitzgerald	Edna Murphy, Kenneth Harlan, Jack Richardson	Drama	Independent
Wings	William A. Wellman	Clara Bow, Charles "Buddy" Rogers, Richard Arlen, Jobyna Ralston	War	Paramount. 2 Academy Award nominations
Winners of the Wilderness	W. S. Van Dyke	Tim McCoy, Joan Crawford	Western	MGM
The Winning Oar	Bernard McEveety	George Walsh, Dorothy Hall	Drama	Independent
The Wise Wife	E. Mason Hopper	Phyllis Haver, Tom Moore, Jacqueline Logan	Comedy	Pathé Exchange
The Wizard	Richard Rosson	Edmund Lowe, Leila Hyams, Gustav von Seyffertitz	Horror	Fox Film
Wolf Fangs	Lewis Seiler	Caryl Lincoln, Charles Morton	Adventure	Fox Film
Wolf's Clothing	Roy Del Ruth	Monte Blue, Patsy Ruth Miller, John Miljan	Comedy	Warner Bros.
Wolf's Trail	Francis Ford	Edmund Cobb, Dixie Lamont	Western	Universal
Wolves of the Air	Francis Ford	Johnnie Walker, Mildred Harris, Maurice Costello	Action	Independent
The Woman on Trial	Mauritz Stiller	Pola Negri, Einar Hanson	Drama	Paramount
The Woman Who Did Not Care	Phil Rosen	Lilyan Tashman, Edward Martindel, Philo McCullough	Drama	Gotham
Woman's Law	Dallas M. Fitzgerald	Pat O'Malley, Lillian Rich	Drama	Independent
Women Love Diamonds	Edmund Goulding	Pauline Starke, Owen Moore, Lionel Barrymore	Drama	MGM
Women's Wares	Arthur Gregor	Evelyn Brent, Bert Lytell	Romance	Tiffany
The World at Her Feet	Luther Reed	Florence Vidor, Arnold Kent	Comedy	Paramount
The Wreck	William James Craft	Shirley Mason, Malcolm McGregor	Drama	Columbia
The Wreck of the Hesperus	Elmer Clifton	Sam De Grasse, Virginia Bradford, Francis Ford, Alan Hale	Adventure	Pathé Exchange
The Wrong Mr. Wright	Scott Sidney	Jean Hersholt, Enid Bennett, Dorothy Devore	Comedy	Universal

== Y ==
Title	Director	Featured Cast	Genre	Note
The Yankee Clipper	Rupert Julian	William Boyd, Elinor Fair, Junior Coghlan, John Miljan	Adventure	PDC
Your Wife and Mine	Frank O'Connor	Phyllis Haver, Stuart Holmes	Comedy	Independent
Yours to Command	David Kirkland	George O'Hara, Shirley Palmer	Comedy	FBO

== Shorts ==
Title	Director	Featured Cast	Genre	Note
The Honorable Mr. Buggs	Fred Jackman	Matt Moore, Anna May Wong, Oliver Hardy	Comedy	
Peaceful Oscar	Fatty Arbuckle	Lloyd Hamilton	Comedy	
Why Girls Love Sailors	Fred Guiol	Stan Laurel, Oliver Hardy	Comedy	
Yale vs. Harvard	Robert F. McGowan	Our Gang kids	Comedy short	Our Gang 2-reeler

== See also ==
- 1927 in American television
- 1927 in the United States
