= The Upland Rider =

1928 film directed by Albert S. Rogell

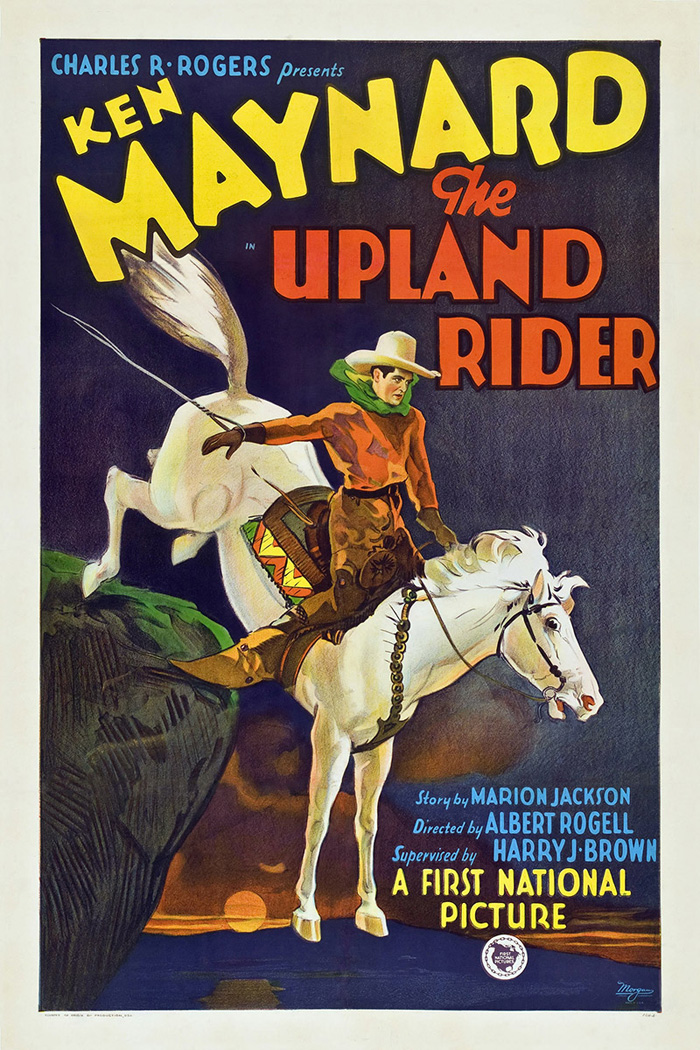
- Theatrical release poster
- Directed by: Albert S. Rogell
- Screenplay by: Ford Beebe
- Story by: Marion Jackson
- Starring: Ken Maynard; Ena Gregory; Lafe McKee; Sydney Jarvis; Robert D. Walker; Bobby Dunn
- Cinematography: Ted McCord
- Edited by: Fred Allen
- Production company: First National Pictures
- Distributed by: First National Pictures
- Release date: June 3, 1928
- Running time: 60 minutes
- Country: United States
- Language: Silent (English intertitles)

The Upland Rider is a 1928 American silent Western film directed by Albert S. Rogell and written by Ford Beebe. The film stars Ken Maynard, Ena Gregory, Lafe McKee, Sydney Jarvis, Robert D. Walker, and Bobby Dunn. The film was released on June 3, 1928, by First National Pictures.

== Cast ==
- Ken Maynard as Dan Dailey
- Ena Gregory as Sally Graham
- Lafe McKee as John Graham
- Sydney Jarvis as Ross Cheswick
- Robert D. Walker as Bernt
- Bobby Dunn as Shorty
- David Kirby as Red
- Robert Milasch as Slim
- Tarzan as Tarzan

== Preservation ==
With no prints of The Upland Rider located in any film archives, it is a lost film.
