= Grinning Guns =

1927 film directed by Albert S. Rogell

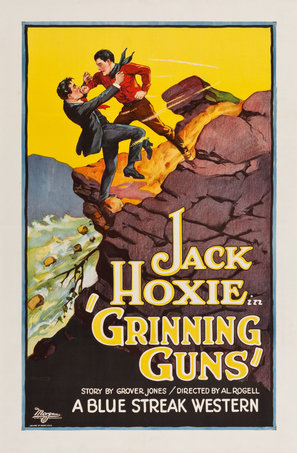
- Theatrical release poster
- Directed by: Albert S. Rogell
- Screenplay by: Grover Jones
- Starring: Jack Hoxie; Ena Gregory; Robert Milasch; Arthur Morrison; George B. French; Dudley Hendricks
- Cinematography: William Nobles
- Production company: Universal Pictures
- Distributed by: Universal Pictures
- Release date: May 22, 1927
- Running time: 50 minutes
- Country: United States
- Languages: Silent; English intertitles

Grinning Guns is a 1927 American silent Western film directed by Albert S. Rogell and written by Grover Jones. The film stars Jack Hoxie, Ena Gregory, Robert Milasch, Arthur Morrison, George B. French and Dudley Hendricks. The film was released on May 22, 1927, by Universal Pictures.

== Cast ==
- Jack Hoxie as 'Grinner' Martin
- Ena Gregory as Mary Felden
- Robert Milasch as Buckaroo Bill
- Arthur Morrison as Harvey Purcell
- George B. French as Amos Felden
- Dudley Hendricks as Sheriff
- Alphonse Martell as Tony the Dude
- Scout as Scout
