= The Power of Silence (1928 film) =

1928 film

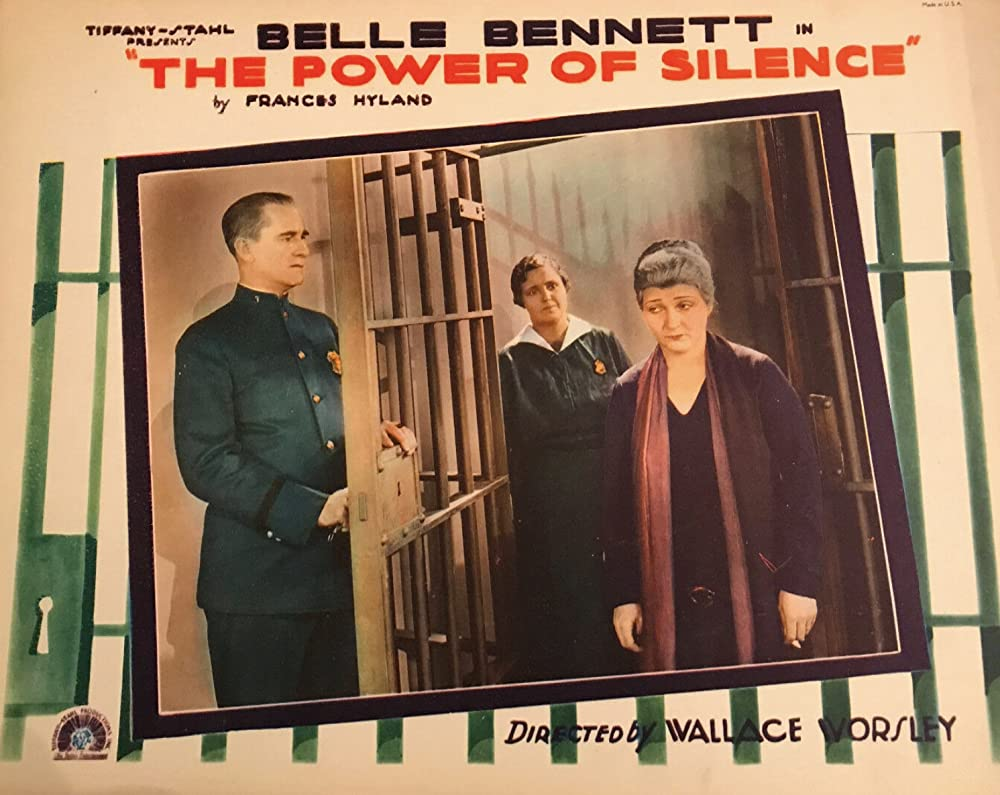
- Directed by: Wallace Worsley
- Written by: Fanny Hatton; Frederic Hatton
- Produced by: John M. Stahl
- Starring: Belle Bennett; Ena Gregory; Anders Randolf
- Cinematography: L. Guy Wilky
- Edited by: Byron Robinson
- Production company: Tiffany-Stahl Productions
- Distributed by: Tiffany Pictures
- Release date: October 20, 1928
- Running time: 60 minutes
- Country: United States
- Languages: Silent; English intertitles

The Power of Silence is a 1928 American silent mystery drama film directed by Wallace Worsley and starring Belle Bennett, Ena Gregory and Anders Randolf. It was produced and distributed by Tiffany Pictures, one of the leading independent studios.

== Synopsis ==
Mamie Stone is charged with the murder of Jim Wright, with whom she had a son Donald, on circumstantial evidence. She refuses to speak out in her defence and is in fact concealing identity of the true killer, Wright's wife Gloria.

== Cast ==
- Belle Bennett as Mamie Stone
- John Westwood as Donald Stone
- Ena Gregory as Gloria Wright
- Anders Randolf as District Attorney
- John St. Polis as Defense Attorney
- Virginia Pearson as Mrs. Wright
- Raymond Keane as Jim Wright
- Jack Singleton as Hotel Clerk

== Bibliography ==
- Connelly, Robert B. The Silents: Silent Feature Films, 1910-36, Volume 40, Issue 2. December Press, 1998.
- Munden, Kenneth White. The American Film Institute Catalog of Motion Pictures Produced in the United States, Part 1. University of California Press, 1997.
