= The Greatest Menace =

1923 silent film

- Directed by: Albert S. Rogell
- Written by: Andrew Bennison; Angela C. Kaufman; Albert S. Rogell
- Produced by: J.G. Mayer
- Starring: Ann Little; Wilfred Lucas; Robert Gordon
- Cinematography: Ross Fisher
- Production company: J.G. Mayer
- Distributed by: Mayer & Quinn
- Release date: May 19, 1923
- Running time: 70 minutes
- Country: United States
- Languages: Silent; English intertitles

The Greatest Menace is a 1923 American silent crime film directed by Albert S. Rogell and starring Ann Little, Wilfred Lucas and Robert Gordon.

== Cast ==
- Ann Little as Velma Wright
- Wilfred Lucas as Charles W. Wright
- Robert Gordon as Charles W. Wright Jr
- Harry Northrup as Herbert Van Raalte
- Jack Livingston as Douglas Ferguson
- Rhea Mitchell as Mary Lewis
- Andy MacLennan as The Gopher
- Mildred June as Mrs. Charles W. Wright Jr
- David Kirby as Riley Hogan
- Gordon Mullen as Tim
- Lew Meehan as Gus

== Bibliography ==
- Munden, Kenneth White. The American Film Institute Catalog of Motion Pictures Produced in the United States, Part 1. University of California Press, 1997.
