= The Better Man (1926 film) =

1926 film

- Directed by: Scott R. Dunlap
- Written by: Clifford Howard; Burke Jenkins; Arthur F. Statter
- Starring: Richard Talmadge; Ena Gregory; John Steppling
- Cinematography: Jack Stevens
- Edited by: Doane Harrison
- Production company: Richard Talmadge Productions
- Distributed by: Film Booking Offices of America
- Release date: June 6, 1926
- Country: United States
- Languages: Silent; English intertitles

The Better Man is a 1926 American silent comedy film directed by Scott R. Dunlap and starring Richard Talmadge, Ena Gregory and John Steppling.

== Cast ==
- Richard Talmadge as Lord Hugh Wainwright
- Ena Gregory as Nancy Burton
- John Steppling as Phineas Ward
- Margaret Campbell as Mrs. Ward
- Herbert Prior as John Knolwton
- Charles Hill Mailes as Charles Clifton
- Percy Williams as Hawkins

== Bibliography ==
- Munden, Kenneth White. The American Film Institute Catalog of Motion Pictures Produced in the United States, Part 1. University of California Press, 1997.
