= Ena Gregory =

Australian actress

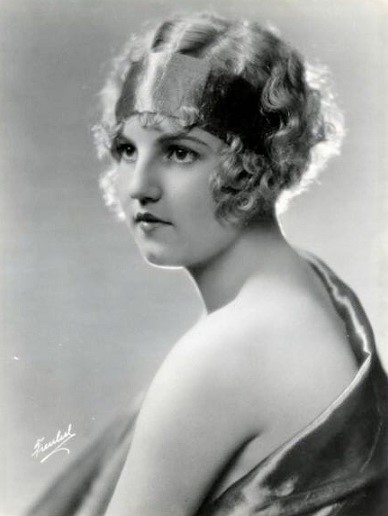
- Gregory c. 1928
- Born: Ena Jessie Gregory; 18 April 1907; St Leonards, New South Wales, Australia
- Died: 13 June 1993 (aged 86); Laguna Beach, California, U.S.
- Other name: Marian Douglas
- Occupation: Actress
- Years active: 1920–1931
- Spouses: Albert Sylvan Rogell (m. 1927; div. 1935) Frank Nolan (m. 1937; div. 1939)

Ena Jessie Gregory (18 April 1907 – 13 June 1993), also known as Marian Douglas, was an Australian-American actress who achieved fame in Hollywood in the 1920s.

== Childhood ==
Ena Gregory was born Ena Jessie Gregory to Arthur and Jessie Gregory in St. Leonards, New South Wales, and grew up in Manly. In Australia, Gregory sang, danced and performed in juvenile roles for the J. C. Williamson organisation, appearing in productions such as Eyes of Youth, in 1918. Apparently travelling with her businessman father, she arrived in California in about 1920.

== Hollywood ==
She was first signed in Hollywood for ingenue roles by Universal Pictures in 1921. She also worked for Hal Roach Studios and First National Pictures. In all she spent five years in comic roles before going into dramatic work. By 1924 she was the leading lady of the Independent Pictures Corporation. She was a WAMPAS Baby Star of 1925.

Gregory's film career started with comedy shorts like The Bull Thrower (1920), Lion's Jaws and Kitten's Paws (1920), and The Whizbang (1921). After completing The Calgary Stampede (1925) and The Chip of the Flying U (1926), with Hoot Gibson, she was promoted to leading lady for Jack Hoxie, for two movies.

== Name change ==
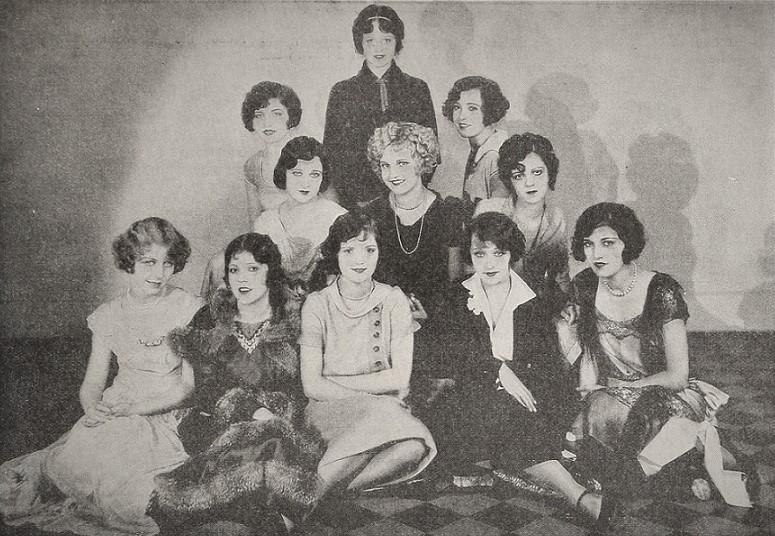
WAMPAS Baby Stars of 1925, including Ena Gregory (center)

When Gregory failed to achieve stardom by losing chances due to illness and other causes, she consulted a Hollywood seer named Dareos. He suggested a new stage name which combined the syllables of Mary Pickford and Douglas Fairbanks. It was Marian Douglas. Her first film using the new name was The Shepherd of the Hills (1928).

Gregory continued to make movies as Marian Douglas until 1931. Her final films are Twisted Tales, Three Wise Clucks, Aloha and Beach Pajamas, all in 1931.

== Personal life ==
Gregory married film director Albert Rogell in 1927, but the union ended in divorce in August 1934. Beverly Hills, California attorney William V.R. Smith was named a co-respondent in a $150,000 lawsuit brought by Rogell. Gregory was awarded a temporary alimony sum of $300 per month from Rogell. Gregory married Dr Frank Nolan on 5 November 1937. The couple separated in May 1938 and Gregory obtained a divorce decree in July 1939.

She took steps to become a U.S. citizen beginning in October 1927.

Retiring from the film industry in 1931, she became a successful real estate agent in Laguna Beach, California.

Ena Gregory died in Laguna Beach in 1993, aged 86.

== Selected filmography ==
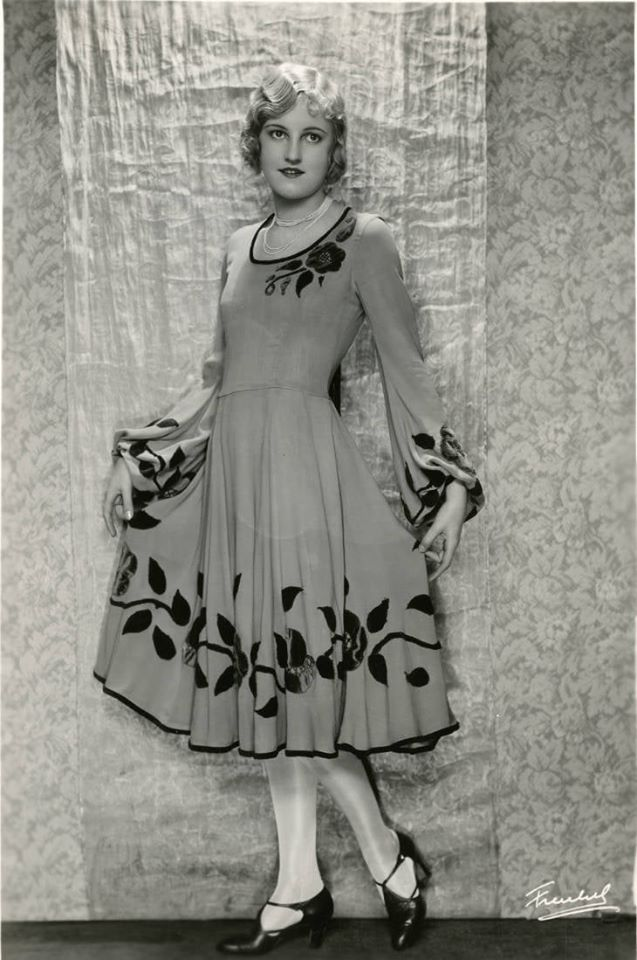
Gregory c. 1927

- Short Skirts (1921)
- Frozen Hearts (1923)
- The Soilers (1923)
- The Law Rustlers (1923)
- Mother's Joy (1923)
- Smithy (1924)
- Postage Due (1924)
- Zeb vs. Paprika (1924) with Stan Laurel
- Brothers Under the Chin (1924)
- Near Dublin (1924)
- Rupert of Hee Haw (1924)
- Wide Open Spaces (1924) with Stan Laurel
- Short Kilts (1924) with Stan Laurel
- The Folly of Vanity (1924)
- Cold Nerve (1925)
- The Desert Flower (1925)
- The Calgary Stampede (1925)
- Sporting Life (1925)
- Red Hot Leather (1926)
- Doubling with Danger (1926)
- The Better Man (1926)
- Red Hot Leather (1926)
- Blazing Days (1927)
- Down the Stretch (1927)
- Grinning Guns (1927)
- The Western Rover (1927)
- Romantic Rogue (1927)
- Men of Daring (1927)
- The Rose of Kildare (1927)
- Rough and Ready (1927)
- The Shepherd of the Hills (1928)
- The Wagon Show (1928)
- The Upland Rider (1928)
- The Power of Silence (1928)
- The Bushranger (1928)
- Sioux Blood (1929)
- Aloha (1931)
- Beach Pajamas (1931)
