= Short Skirts =

1921 film

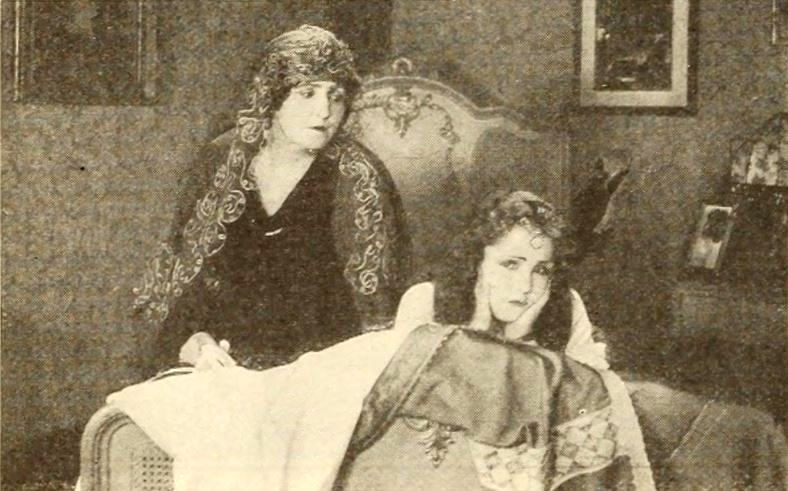
- Directed by: Harry B. Harris
- Written by: Doris Schroeder
- Based on: What Can You Expect by Alice L. Tildesley
- Produced by: Carl Laemmle
- Starring: Gladys Walton; Ena Gregory; Jack Mower
- Cinematography: Earl M. Ellis
- Production company: Universal Pictures
- Distributed by: Universal Pictures
- Release date: July 1921
- Running time: 50 minutes
- Country: United States
- Languages: Silent; English intertitles

Short Skirts is a 1921 American silent drama film directed by Harry B. Harris and starring Gladys Walton, Ena Gregory and Jack Mower.

== Cast ==
- Gladys Walton as Natalie Smith
- Ena Gregory as Stella
- Jack Mower as Lance Christie
- Jean Hathaway as Mrs. Shirley Smith
- Scotty MacGregor as Spike Masters
- Edward Martindel as Wallace Brewster
- Harold Miller as Billy Gregg
- William Welsh as Woodward Christie
- Howard Ralston as Douglas Smith

== Censorship ==
Before Short Skirts could be released in Kansas, the Kansas Board of Review required the elimination of two scenes and an intertitle. The scenes removed were of a woman taking papers from a safe in reel 4 was removed, and a man putting his arm around a woman with the accompanying intertitle "When people change their minds, they usually have to pay."

== Bibliography ==
- Goble, Alan. The Complete Index to Literary Sources in Film. Walter de Gruyter, 1999.
