= Red Hot Leather =

1926 film directed by Albert S. Rogell

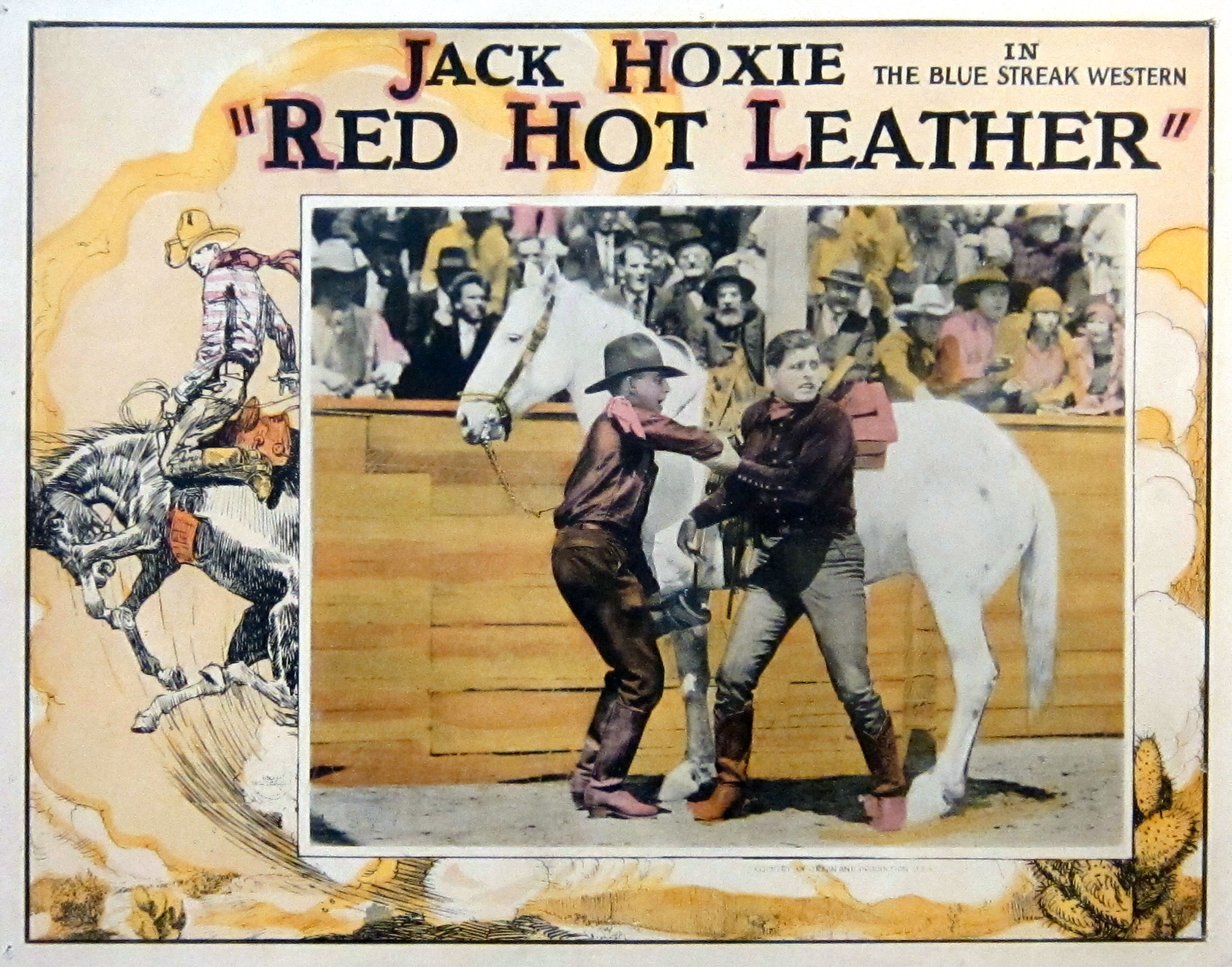
- Lobby card
- Directed by: Albert S. Rogell
- Written by: Harrison Jacobs
- Story by: Albert S. Rogell
- Produced by: Carl Laemmle
- Starring: Jack Hoxie; Ena Gregory; Billy Engle
- Cinematography: William Nobles
- Production company: Universal Pictures
- Distributed by: Universal Pictures
- Release date: October 17, 1926
- Running time: 5 reels
- Country: United States
- Language: Silent (English intertitles)

Red Hot Leather is a 1926 American silent Western film directed by Albert S. Rogell and starring Jack Hoxie, Ena Gregory, and Billy Engle.

== Plot ==
As described in a film magazine, Jack Lane, dejected after an unsuccessful attempt to borrow money in the east to hold his father's ranch from the clutches of a heartless mortgage holder, on the train meets Ellen Rand, who is smitten at the sight of the first real cowboy she has ever known, and in turn smites the cowpuncher. Upon reaching home, Jack is overjoyed to hear that she is a nurse come to take care of his paralytic father, who steadily weakens from the fear that the old ranch will be foreclosed on the twentieth of the month.

Jack jumps at the one last chance to raise the money at the annual rodeo, where he must win two events. Morton Kane, who holds the mortgage and who has discovered oil on the ranch unknown to the owner, plots with his son Ross, who would like to get the young woman away from Jack, to keep him from entering the events. At the last minute Jack discovers that his horse Scout has been stolen. He follows a false lead supplied by Kane and is waylaid by Kane's men, but he escapes and, stealing Kane's car, races for the rodeo, while his trained horse unties the knots and frees himself. Ellen rides him to the rodeo, arriving in time to enter him for the relay race, which Jack wins along with the bucking horse event. With the prize money Jack and Ellen drive to town just in time to save the ranch. Kane tells them of the oil on the land, and Ellen goes with her wealthy husband-to-be. The news of Jack's success affects a miraculous healing of the father.

== Cast ==
- Jack Hoxie as Jack Lane
- Ena Gregory as Ellen Rand
- William Malan as Daniel Lane
- Tom Shirley as Ross Kane
- William H. Turner as Morton Kane
- George B. French as Dr. Robert Marsh
- Billy Engle as 'Dinkey' Hook
- Jim Corey as 'Red' Hussey
- Syd Saylor as 'Noisy' Bates (credited as Leo Sailor)

== Preservation ==
A partial print of Red Hot Leather with 4 reels is held by Gosfilmofond of Russia.

== Bibliography ==
- Munden, Kenneth White. The American Film Institute Catalog of Motion Pictures Produced in the United States, Part 1. University of California Press, 1997.
