= Aloha (1931 film) =

1931 film directed by Albert S. Rogell

- Directed by: Albert S. Rogell
- Written by: Thomas H. Ince Jr. J.G. Hawks; Adele Buffington; Leslie Mason; Wellyn Totman
- Starring: Ben Lyon; Raquel Torres; Thelma Todd
- Cinematography: Charles J. Stumar
- Music by: Richard Cahoon
- Production company: Tiffany Pictures
- Distributed by: Tiffany Pictures; Gaumont British Distributors (UK)
- Release date: April 27, 1931
- Running time: 90 minutes
- Country: United States
- Language: English

Aloha is a 1931 American drama film directed by Albert S. Rogell and starring Ben Lyon, Raquel Torres and Thelma Todd. It was produced and distributed by the independent studio Tiffany Pictures, one of the largest companies outside of the major studios. It was released in Britain by Gaumont British Distributors under the alternative title No Greater Love.

== Plot ==
In the South Seas, an island girl Ilanu of mixed heritage refuses to marry the man chosen for her and instead falls in love with a Harvard-educated American.

== Cast ==
- Ben Lyon as Jimmy Bradford
- Raquel Torres as Ilanu
- Robert Edeson as James Bradford, Sr.
- Alan Hale as Stevens
- Thelma Todd as Winifred Bradford
- Ena Gregory as Elaine Marvin
- Otis Harlan as Old Ben
- T. Roy Barnes as Johnny Marvin
- Robert Ellis as Larry Leavitt
- Donald Reed as Kahea
- Al St. John as Sailor
- Dickie Moore as Junior Bradford
- Marcia Harris as Governess
- Addie McPhail as Rosalie
