= Doubling with Danger =

1926 film by Scott R. Dunlap

- Directed by: Scott R. Dunlap
- Written by: Grover Jones
- Starring: Richard Talmadge; Ena Gregory; Joseph W. Girard
- Edited by: Doane Harrison
- Production company: Richard Talmadge Productions
- Distributed by: Film Booking Offices of America; Ideal Films (UK)
- Release date: July 18, 1926
- Country: United States
- Languages: Silent; English intertitles

Doubling with Danger is a 1926 American silent mystery film directed by Scott R. Dunlap and starring Richard Talmadge, Ena Gregory and Joseph W. Girard.

== Cast ==
- Richard Talmadge as Dick Forsythe
- Ena Gregory as Madeline Haver
- Joseph W. Girard as Elwood Haver
- Fred Kelsey as Avery McCade
- Harry Dunkinson as Detective McCade
- Douglas Gerrard as Malcolm Davis
- Paul Dennis as Arthur Channing
- Herbert Prior as Manning Davis
- Joseph Harrington as Morton Stephens

== Bibliography ==
- Munden, Kenneth White. The American Film Institute Catalog of Motion Pictures Produced in the United States, Part 1. University of California Press, 1997.
