= The Western Rover =

1927 film directed by Albert S. Rogell

- Directed by: Albert S. Rogell
- Screenplay by: George Hively
- Starring: Art Acord; Ena Gregory; Charles Avery; William Welsh; Albert J. Smith
- Cinematography: Edward Linden
- Production company: Universal Pictures
- Distributed by: Universal Pictures
- Release date: June 5, 1927
- Running time: 50 minutes
- Country: United States
- Languages: Silent; English intertitles

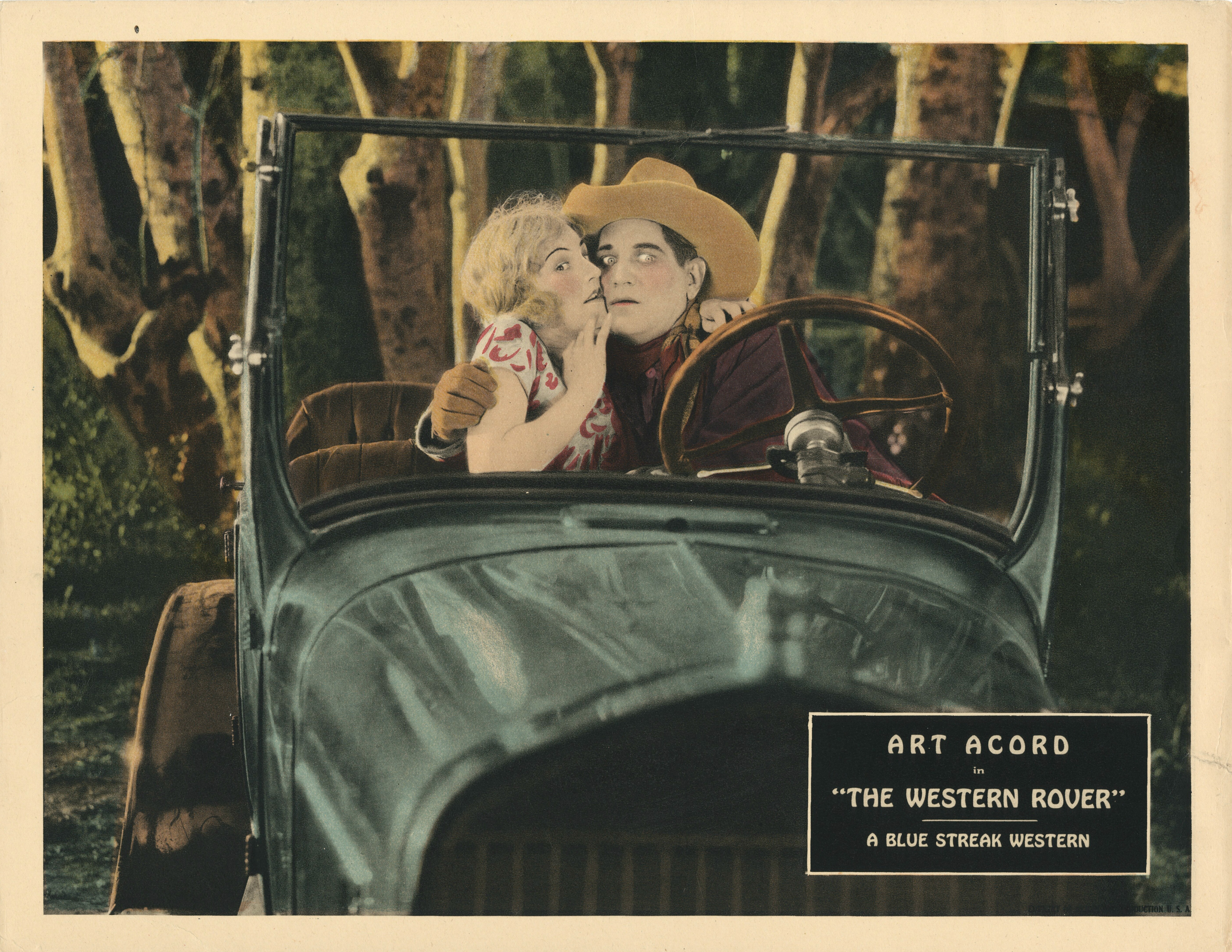
Western Rover (1927) lobby card

The Western Rover is a 1927 American silent Western film directed by Albert S. Rogell and written by George Hively. The film stars Art Acord, Ena Gregory, Charles Avery, William Welsh and Albert J. Smith. The film was released on June 5, 1927, by Universal Pictures.

== Cast ==
- Art Acord as Art Hayes
- Ena Gregory as Millie Donlin
- Charles Avery as Hinkey Hall
- William Welsh as Alexander Seaton
- Albert J. Smith as Bud Barstry
- Raven the Horse as Raven
- Rex the Dog as Rex
