= The Sunset Derby =

1927 film by Albert S. Rogell

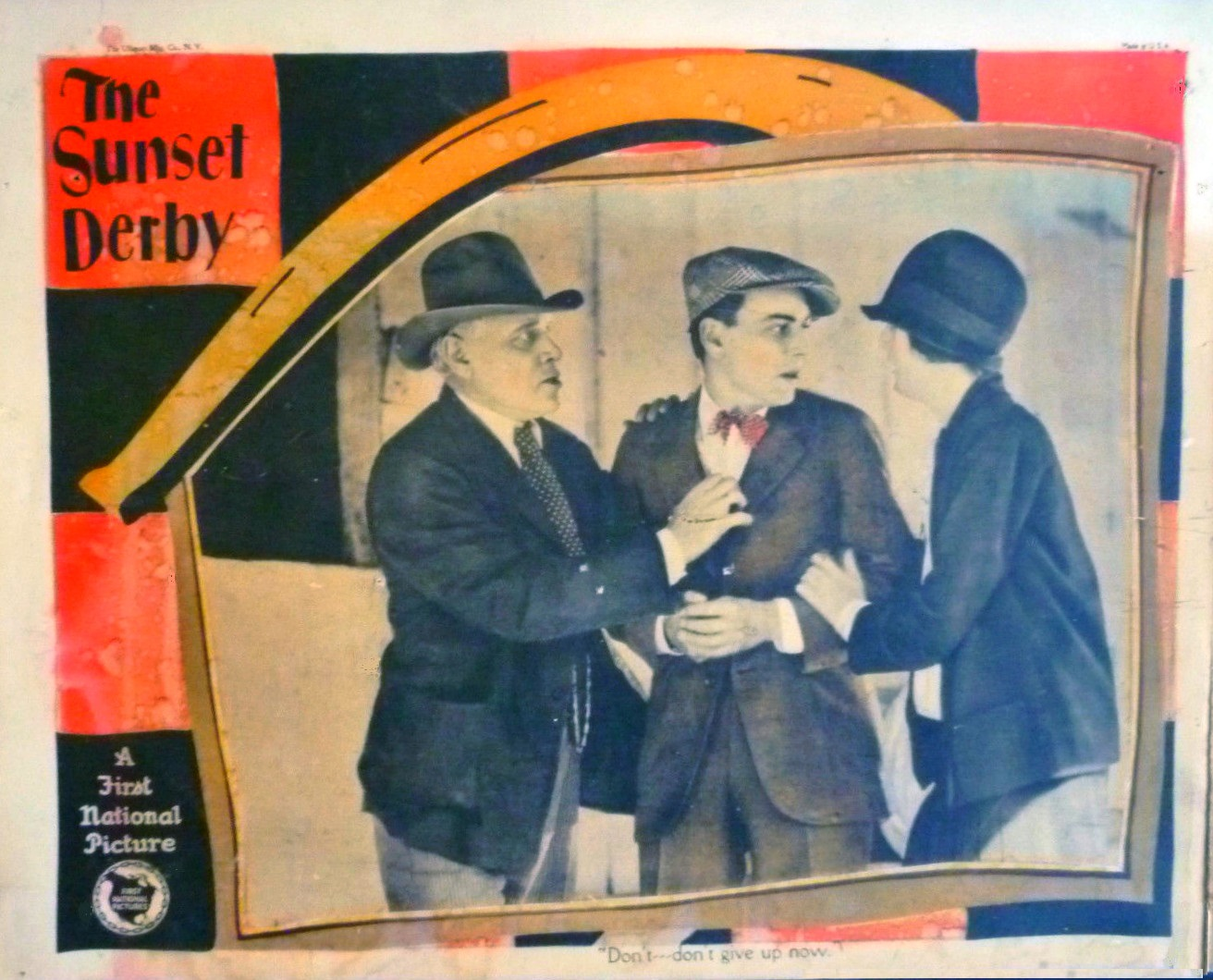
- Lobby card
- Directed by: Albert S. Rogell
- Written by: Curtis Benton; Mort Blumenstock
- Based on: "The Sunset Derby" by William Dudley Pelley
- Produced by: Charles R. Rogers
- Starring: Mary Astor; William Collier Jr. Ralph Lewis
- Cinematography: Ross Fisher
- Production company: First National Pictures
- Distributed by: First National Pictures
- Release date: June 5, 1927
- Running time: 6 reels
- Country: United States
- Language: Silent (English intertitles)

The Sunset Derby is a 1927 American silent drama film directed by Albert S. Rogell and starring Mary Astor, William Collier Jr., and Ralph Lewis.

== Cast ==
- Mary Astor as Molly Gibson
- William Collier Jr. as Jimmy Burke
- Ralph Lewis as Sam Gibson
- David Kirby as Mike Donovan
- Lionel Belmore as Jack McTeague
- Burt Ross as Bobby McTeague
- Henry A. Barrows as 'Lucky' Davis
- Bobby Doyle as Skeeter Donohue
- Michael Visaroff as Peddler

== See also ==
- List of films about horses

== Bibliography ==
- Lowe, Denise. An Encyclopedic Dictionary of Women in Early American Films: 1895-1930. Routledge, 2014.
