= Rough and Ready (1927 film) =

1927 film directed by Albert S. Rogell

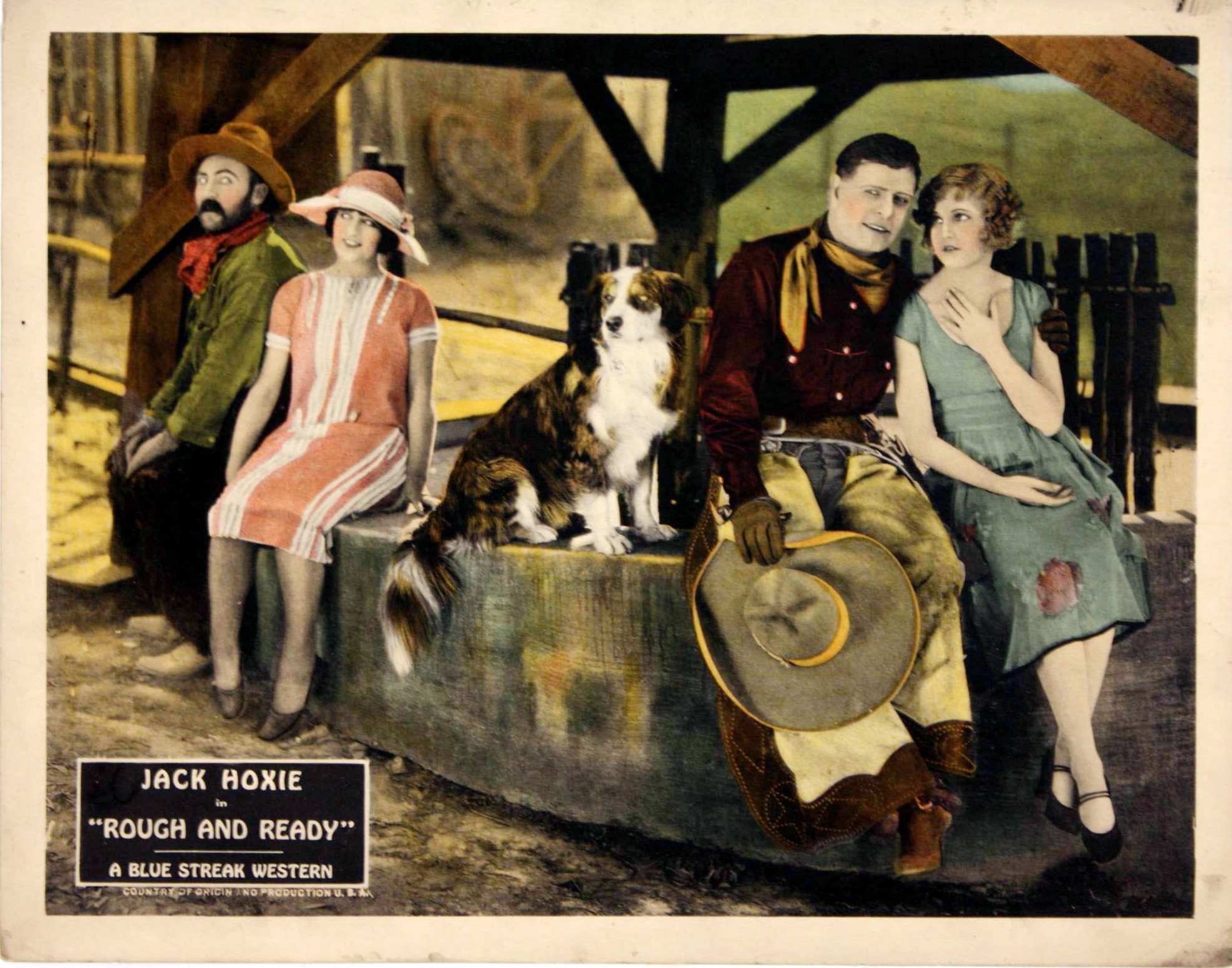
- Directed by: Albert S. Rogell
- Written by: William Berke; Gardner Bradford
- Produced by: Carl Laemmle
- Starring: Jack Hoxie; Ena Gregory; Marin Sais
- Cinematography: William Nobles
- Production company: Universal Pictures
- Distributed by: Universal Pictures
- Release date: January 9, 1927
- Running time: 50 minutes
- Country: United States
- Languages: Silent; English intertitles

Rough and Ready is a 1927 American silent Western film directed by Albert S. Rogell and starring Jack Hoxie, Ena Gregory and Marin Sais.

== Cast ==
- Jack Hoxie as Ned Raleigh
- Ena Gregory as Beth Stone
- Jack Pratt as 'Parson' Smith
- William Steele as Morris Manning
- Monte Montague as 'Rawhide' Barton
- Clark Comstock as John Stone
- Marin Sais as Martha Bowman
- Bert De Marc as Bill Blake

== Bibliography ==
- Rainey, Buck. Sweethearts of the Sage: Biographies and Filmographies of 258 actresses appearing in Western movies. McFarland & Company, 1992.
