= The Red Raiders =

1927 film directed by Albert S. Rogell

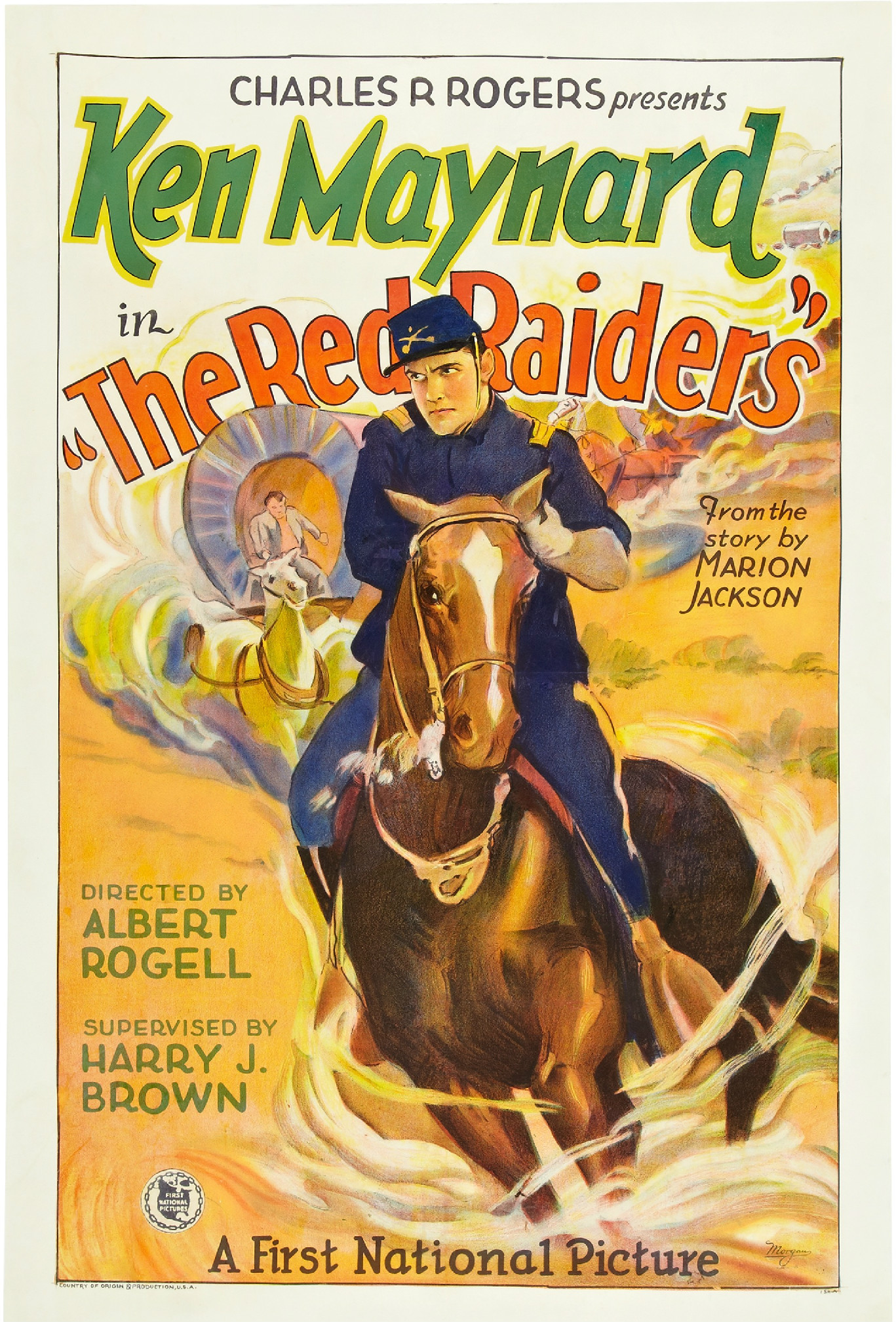
- Directed by: Albert S. Rogell
- Written by: Marion Jackson; Don Ryan (intertitles)
- Produced by: Charles R. Rogers; Harry Joe Brown
- Starring: Ken Maynard; J. P. McGowan; Paul Hurst
- Cinematography: Ross Fisher
- Edited by: Charles R. Rogers Productions
- Distributed by: First National Pictures
- Release date: September 4, 1927
- Running time: 70 minutes
- Country: United States
- Languages: Silent; English intertitles

The Red Raiders is an extant 1927 American silent Western film directed by Albert S. Rogell and starring Ken Maynard. It was distributed by First National Pictures.

== Cast ==
- Ken Maynard as Lt. John Scott
- Anne Drew as Jane Logan
- J. P. McGowan as Jane Logan
- Paul Hurst as Sgt. Murphy
- Harry Shutan as Izzy Epstein
- Ben Corbett as Cpl Clancy
- Tom Bay as Earl Logan
- Chief Yowlachie as Lone Wolf
- Tarzan as A Horse

== Preservation status ==
The film survives at the Library of Congress, Filmoteca Espanola, Danish Film Archives and National Archives of Canada.
