= The Devil's Saddle =

1927 film directed by Albert S. Rogell

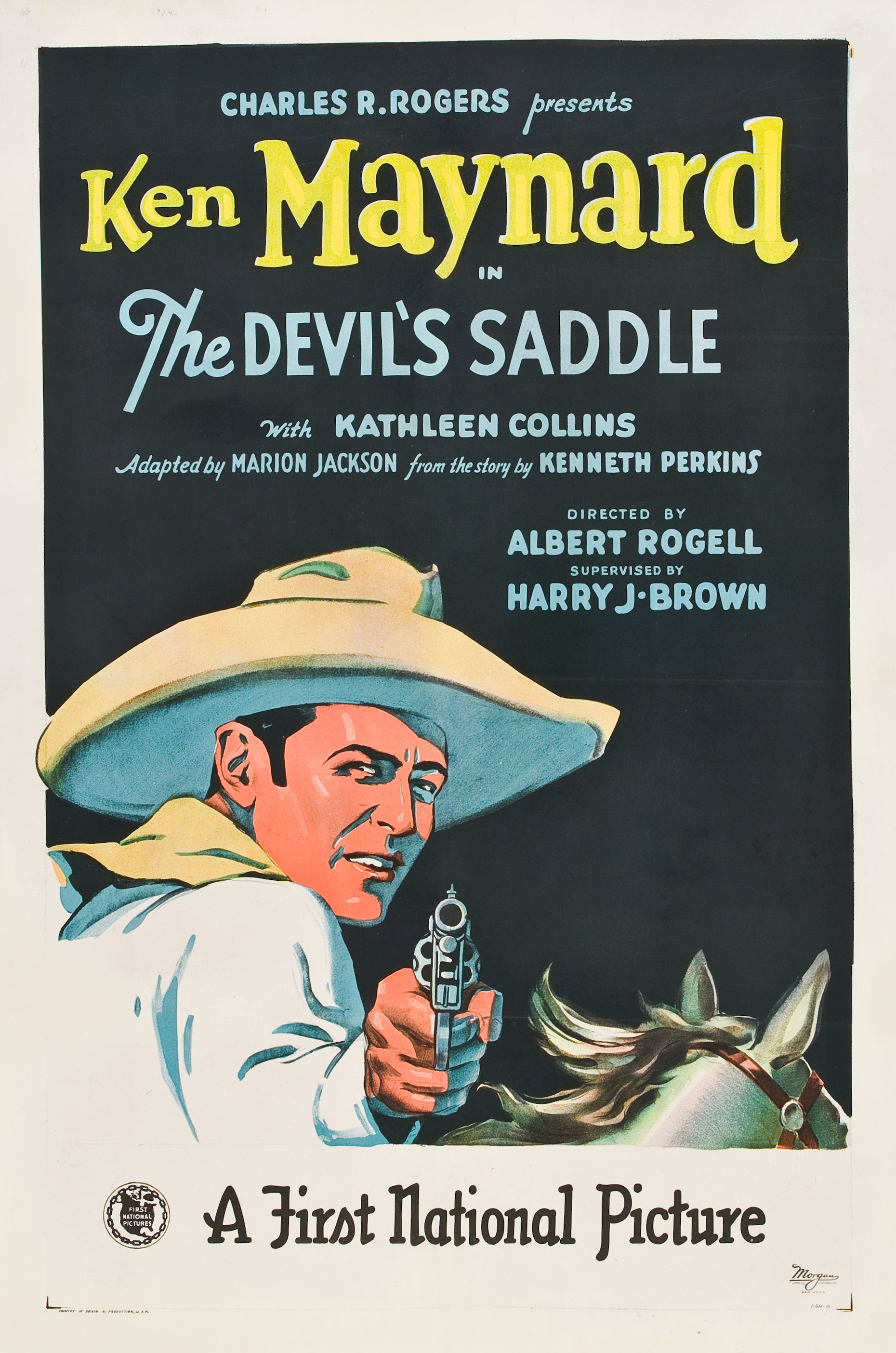
- Theatrical release poster
- Directed by: Albert S. Rogell
- Screenplay by: Marion Jackson
- Based on: "The Devil's Saddle" by Kenneth Perkins
- Starring: Ken Maynard; Kathleen Collins; Francis Ford; Will Walling; Earl Metcalfe; Paul Hurst
- Cinematography: Ross Fisher
- Production company: Charles R. Rogers Productions
- Distributed by: First National Pictures
- Release date: July 10, 1927
- Running time: 60 minutes
- Country: United States
- Languages: Silent; English intertitles

The Devil's Saddle is a 1927 American silent Western film directed by Albert S. Rogell and written by Marion Jackson. The film stars Ken Maynard, Kathleen Collins, Francis Ford, Will Walling, Earl Metcalfe and Paul Hurst. It is based on the story "The Devil's Saddle" by Kenneth Perkins published in Argosy, October 30 – December 4, 1926. The film was released on July 10, 1927, by First National Pictures.

== Cast ==
- Ken Maynard as Harry Morrel
- Kathleen Collins as Jane Grey
- Francis Ford as Pete Hepburn
- Will Walling as Sheriff Morrel
- Earl Metcalfe as 'Gentle' Ladley
- Paul Hurst as 'Swig' Moran
- Tarzan as Tarzan

== Preservation ==
With no prints of The Devil's Saddle located in any film archives, it is a lost film.
