= Blind Alleys (film) =

1927 American silent romantic drama film

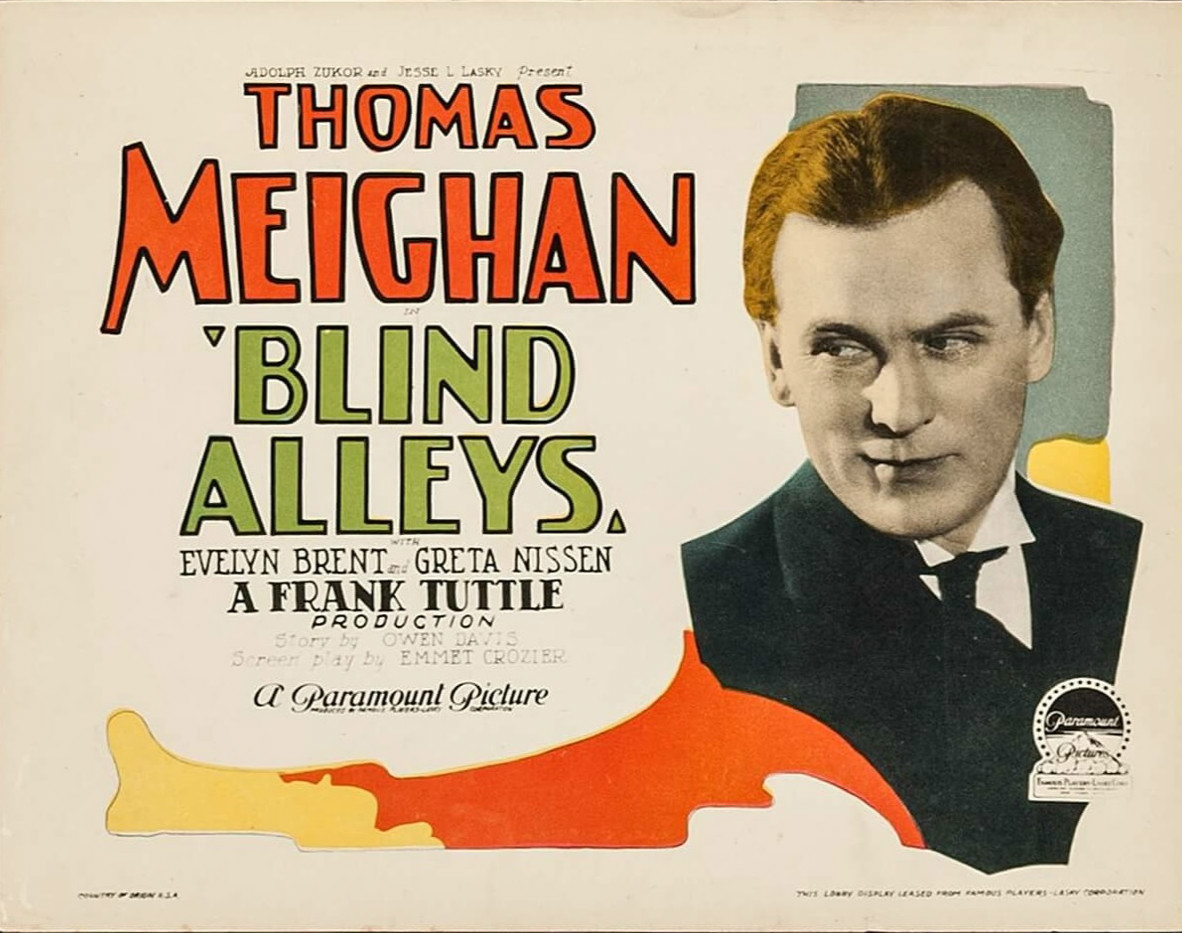
- Lobby card
- Directed by: Frank Tuttle
- Written by: Emmet Crozier
- Story by: Owen Davis
- Produced by: William LeBaron
- Starring: Thomas Meighan; Evelyn Brent
- Cinematography: Alvin Wyckoff
- Distributed by: Paramount Pictures
- Release date: February 26, 1927
- Running time: 60 minutes
- Country: United States
- Language: Silent (English intertitles)

Blind Alleys is a 1927 American silent romantic drama film directed by Frank Tuttle and starring Thomas Meighan and Evelyn Brent.

== Cast ==
- Thomas Meighan as Captain Dan Kirby
- Evelyn Brent as Sally Ray
- Greta Nissen as Maria d'Alvarez Kirby
- Hugh Miller as Julio Lachados
- Thomas Chalmers as Dr. Webster
- Tammany Young as Gang Leader
