= Romantic Rogue =

1927 film

- Directed by: Harry Joe Brown
- Written by: Henry Roberts Symonds
- Produced by: Harry Joe Brown
- Starring: Reed Howes; Ena Gregory; Syd Crossley
- Cinematography: Walter L. Griffin
- Production company: Harry J. Brown Productions
- Distributed by: Rayart Pictures
- Release date: June 1927
- Running time: 50 minutes
- Country: United States
- Languages: Silent; English intertitles

Romantic Rogue is a 1927 American silent comedy film directed by Harry Joe Brown and starring Reed Howes, Ena Gregory and Syd Crossley. It was distributed by the independent Rayart Pictures, the forerunner of Monogram Pictures.

== Synopsis ==
Hart Lawson, the heir to a wealthy patent medicine family who are all in bad health, rejects their view that he too is sickly and sets out to demonstrate his healthiness.

== Cast ==
- Reed Howes as Hart Lawson
- Ena Gregory as Barbara Warrington
- James Bradbury Sr. as Uncle Arch Lawson
- Syd Crossley as Uncle Reg Lawson
- Cuyler Supplee as Harry Lawson

== Bibliography ==
- Munden, Kenneth White. The American Film Institute Catalog of Motion Pictures Produced in the United States, Part 1. University of California Press, 1997.
