= Men of Daring =

1927 film directed by Albert S. Rogell

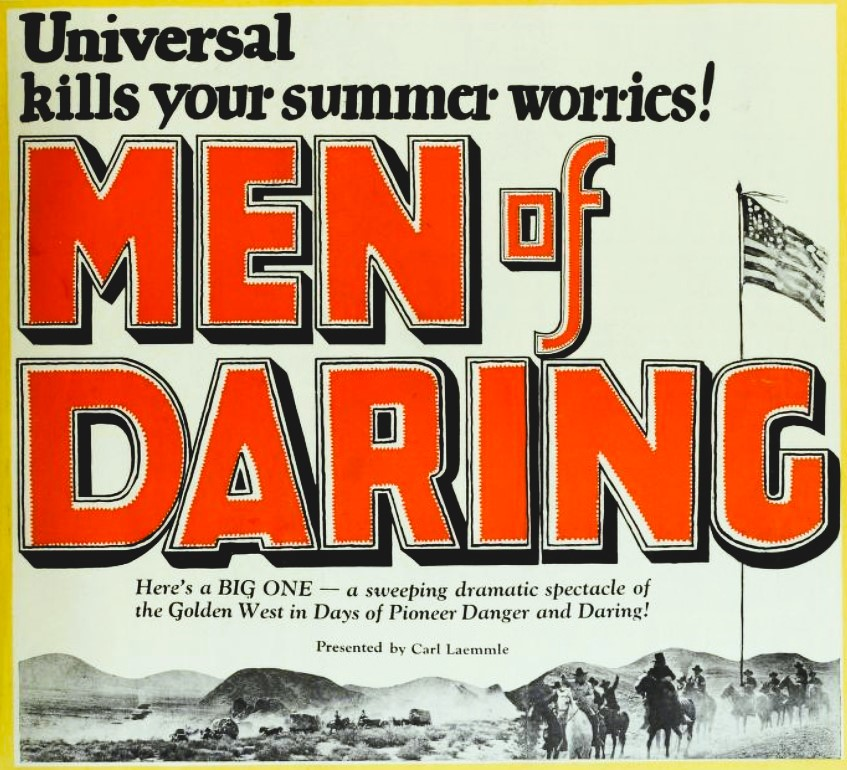
- Advertisement
- Directed by: Albert S. Rogell
- Screenplay by: Marion Jackson
- Starring: Jack Hoxie; Ena Gregory; Marin Sais; Francis Ford
- Cinematography: William Nobles
- Production company: Universal Pictures
- Distributed by: Universal Pictures
- Release date: June 5, 1927
- Running time: 70 minutes
- Country: United States
- Language: Silent (English intertitles)

Men of Daring is a 1927 American silent Western film directed by Albert S. Rogell and written by Marion Jackson. The film stars Jack Hoxie, Ena Gregory, Marin Sais, Francis Ford, James T. Kelley, and Ernie Adams. The film was released on June 5, 1927, by Universal Pictures.

== Cast ==
- Jack Hoxie as Jack Benton
- Ena Gregory as Nancy Owen
- Marin Sais as Mother Owen
- Francis Ford as Black Roger
- James T. Kelley as Piney
- Ernie Adams as Ace
- Robert Milasch as King
- Bert Lindley as Colonel Murphy
- Bert Appling as Lone Wolf
- William Malan as Jasper Morton
- Joseph Bennett as David Owen

== Preservation ==
With no prints of Men of Daring located in any film archives, it is a lost film.
