= Blazing Days =

1927 film

- Directed by: William Wyler
- Written by: Robert F. Hill; George H. Plympton
- Story by: Florence Ryerson
- Produced by: Universal Pictures
- Starring: Fred Hume
- Cinematography: Alan Jones
- Distributed by: Universal Pictures
- Release date: March 27, 1927
- Running time: 5 reels
- Country: United States
- Languages: Silent; English intertitles

Blazing Days is a 1927 American silent Western film directed by William Wyler and produced and released by Universal Pictures.

A print is preserved at the Library of Congress and UCLA Film & Television Archive.

== Cast ==
- Fred Hume - Smilin Sam Perry
- Ena Gregory - Milly Morgan
- Churchill Ross - Jim Morgan
- Bruce Gordon - "Dude" Dutton
- Eva Thatcher - Ma Bascomb
- Bernard Siegel - Ezra Skinner
- Dick L'Estrange - "Turtle-Neck-Pete"
