= Albert S. Rogell =

American film director

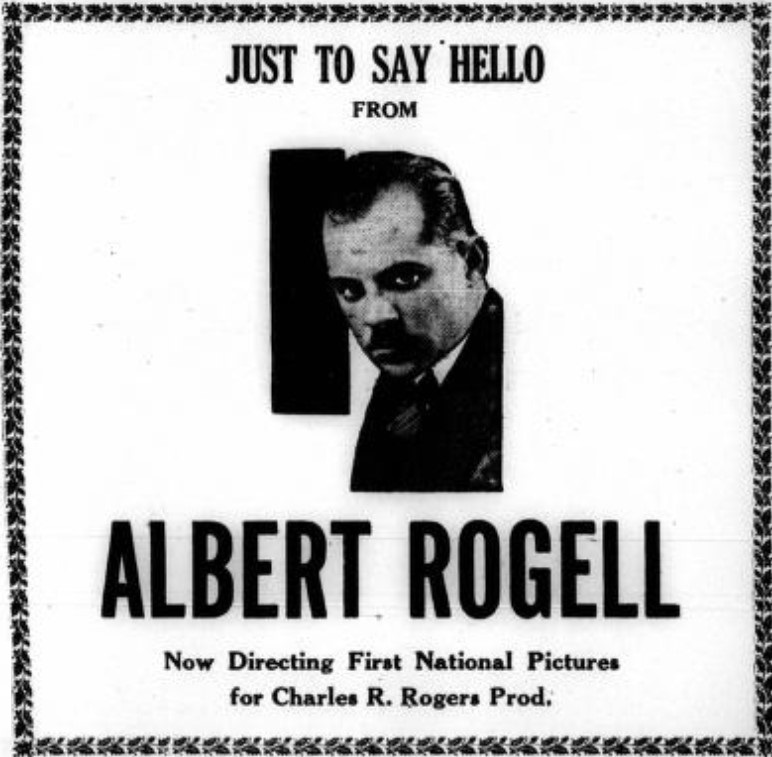
- 1926 season's greetings
- Born: August 21, 1901; Oklahoma City, Oklahoma, United States
- Died: April 7, 1988 (aged 86); Los Angeles, California, United States
- Occupation: Film director
- Relatives: Sid Rogell (uncle)

Albert S. Rogell (August 21, 1901 – April 7, 1988) was an American film director who was born in Oklahoma City and died in Los Angeles. Rogell directed more than a hundred movies between 1921 and 1958. He was known for an aggressive directing style, shouting at his actors and crew.

== Biography ==
Rogell began his career in Hollywood at age 16 as an assistant to director and producer George Loane Tucker. In 1923, he moved to directing with The Greatest Menace. He worked as a director for Universal Pictures and then for First National Pictures. Later in his career, he worked for Columbia Pictures and made patriotic films for Republic Pictures during World War II.

In 1950, his reputation was damaged when he joined a group of directors that campaigned to recall Joseph L. Mankiewicz as president of the Screen Director's Guild after Mankiewicz objected to instituting a loyalty oath. As a result, Rogell moved to television in the 1950s, directing episodes of Broken Arrow and My Friend Flicka.

He was the uncle of producer Sid Rogell.

== Filmography ==
- The Greatest Menace (1923)
- The Mask of Lopez (1924)
- The Dangerous Coward (1924)
- Galloping Gallagher (1924)
- The Fighting Sap (1924)
- Lightning Romance (1924)
- The Silent Stranger (1924)
- North of Nevada (1924)
- Geared to Go (1924)
- Thundering Hoofs (1924)
- Easy Money (1925)
- Super Speed (1925)
- The Snob Buster (1925)
- Cyclone Cavalier (1925)
- Crack o' Dawn (1925)
- The Circus Cyclone (1925)
- The Knockout Kid (1925)
- Fighting Fate (1925)
- The Fear Fighter (1925)
- Youth's Gamble (1925)
- Goat Getter (1925)
- The Patent Leather Pug (1925)
- The Wild Horse Stampede (1926)
- The Man from the West (1926)
- Red Hot Leather (1926)
- The Unknown Cavalier (1926)
- Señor Daredevil (1926)
- Men of the Night (1926)
- The Sunset Derby (1927)
- The Red Raiders (1927)
- Grinning Guns (1927)
- The Devil's Saddle (1927)
- Men of Daring (1927)
- The Western Whirlwind (1927)
- Somewhere in Sonora (1927)
- The Overland Stage (1927)
- The Flying Marine (1927)
- The Western Rover (1927)
- Rough and Ready (1927)
- The Fighting Three (1927)
- The Canyon of Adventure (1928)
- The Phantom City (1928)
- The Upland Rider (1928)
- The Glorious Trail (1928)
- The Shepherd of the Hills (1928)
- Painted Faces (1929)
- The California Mail (1929)
- Cheyenne (1929)
- The Flying Marine (1929)
- The Lone Wolf's Daughter (1929)
- Mamba (1930)
- Aloha (1931)
- Sweepstakes (1931)
- The Tip-Off (1931)
- Suicide Fleet (1931)
- Carnival Boat (1932)
- The Rider of Death Valley (1932)
- Air Hostess (1933)
- The Wrecker (1933)
- Below the Sea (1933)
- Fog (1933)
- East of Fifth Avenue (1934)
- No More Women (1934)
- The Hell Cat (1934)
- Name the Woman (1934)
- Fugitive Lady (1934)
- Among the Missing (1934)
- Atlantic Adventure (1935)
- Escape from Devil's Island (1935)
- Air Hawks (1935)
- Unknown Woman (1935)
- Roaming Lady (1936)
- You May Be Next (1936)
- Grand Jury (1936)
- Murder in Greenwich Village (1937)
- Start Cheering (1938)
- City Streets (1938)
- The Last Warning (1938)
- The Lone Wolf in Paris (1938)
- For Love or Money (1939)
- Laugh It Off (1939)
- Hawaiian Nights (1939)
- I Can't Give You Anything But Love, Baby (1940)
- Argentine Nights (1940)
- Li'l Abner (1940)
- Private Affairs (1940)
- The Black Cat (1941)
- Sailors on Leave (1941)
- Public Enemies (1941)
- Tight Shoes (1941)
- Jail House Blues (1942)
- Sleepytime Gal (1942)
- Priorities on Parade (1942)
- Youth on Parade (1942)
- Butch Minds the Baby (1942)
- True to the Army (1942)
- Hit Parade of 1943 (1943)
- In Old Oklahoma (1943)
- Love, Honor and Goodbye (1945)
- Earl Carroll Sketchbook (1946)
- The Magnificent Rogue (1946)
- Heaven Only Knows (1947)
- Northwest Stampede (1948)
- Song of India (1949)
- The Admiral Was a Lady (1950)
- Before I Wake (1955)
