= Robert Milasch =

American actor

- Born: Robert Emmett Milasch; April 18, 1885; New York
- Died: November 14, 1954 (aged 69); Woodland Hills, California
- Other names: Robert Milash; Robert E. Milasch; Robert Milach; R.E. Milasch
- Occupation: actor
- Years active: 1903–1951
- Spouse(s): Frances Strong (1 child); Virginia Rose
- Children: 1 child

Robert Milasch (April 18, 1885 – November 14, 1954) was an American character actor in the silent and sound periods. He was 6 feet, 6 inches tall.

== Biography ==
Milasch left his Smoke Mountain, Tennessee, home at age 9, joining a wagon circus that went through the village. At age 13, performing as a contortionist, he joined another circus and went with it to South Africa. He left that troupe after being beaten by his boss and went to England, where he worked as a clown. Back in the United States in 1898, he joined Gaumont and began acting in short films for it.

Milasch acted on stage before he worked in films. He began his film career in 1903 at 18 at the Edison Manufacturing Company. One of his first Edison films was two appearances in the classic The Great Train Robbery. In the sound era nearly every film appearance was uncredited.

Milasch died of uremic poisoning on November 14, 1954, in Woodland Hills, California, aged 69.

== Selected filmography ==
- The Great Train Robbery (1903)
- The Eagle's Mate (1914)
- Under the Greenwood Tree (1918)
- The Two Brides (1919)
- Mrs. Wiggs of the Cabbage Patch (1919)
- The Rough Neck (1919)
- The Fourteenth Man (1920)
- Black Beauty (1921)
- Catch My Smoke (1922)
- Confidence (1922)
- The Prodigal Judge (1922)
- The Dramatic Life of Abraham Lincoln (1924)
- The Iron Horse (1924)
- Captain Blood (1924)
- Peter Pan (1924)
- The Right of the Strongest (1924)
- The Girl from Montmartre (1926)
- The Phantom Bullet (1926)
- Men of Daring (1927)
- A Hero for a Night (1927)
- The Little Shepherd of Kingdom Come (1928)
- Chasing Rainbows (1930) (*uncredited)
- Dangerous Nan McGrew (1930)
