= Forrest Stanley =

American actor

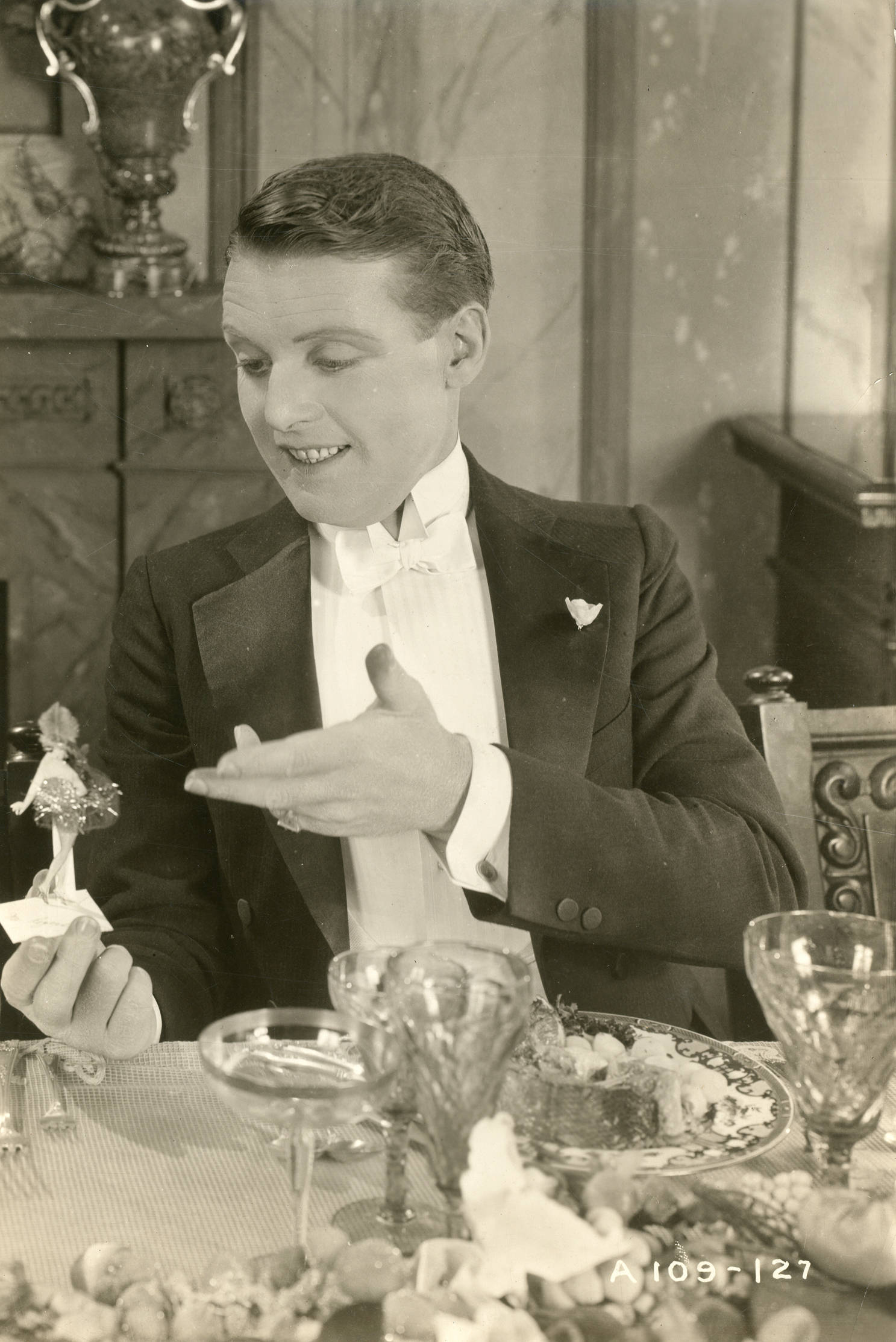
- Stanley in 1922
- Born: August 21, 1889; New York City, U.S.
- Died: August 27, 1969 (aged 80); Los Angeles, California, U.S.
- Resting place: Holy Cross Cemetery, Culver City
- Years active: 1915–1959

Forrest Stanley (August 21, 1889 – August 27, 1969) was an American actor and screenplay writer best known for his work in silent film. He is particularly known for his role as Charles Brandon in the historical film When Knighthood Was in Flower (1922) by Robert G. Vignola and Charles Wilder in the murder mystery film The Cat and the Canary (1927) directed by Paul Leni. He also appeared in the 1912 play The Seven Sisters, opposite Laurette Taylor, directed by Oliver Morosco.

== Partial filmography ==
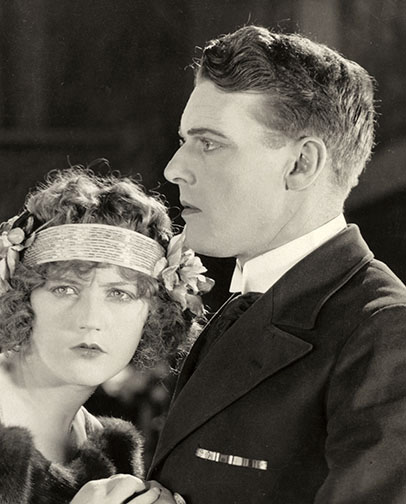
Stanley with Marion Davies in The Young Diana (1922)

Year	Film	Role	Director	Notes
1915	The Yankee Girl	Jack Lawrence	Jack J. Clark	
1916	The Tongues of Men	Reverend Sturgis	Frank Lloyd	
1916	Madame la Presidente	Cyprian Gaudet	Frank Lloyd	
1916	The Code of Marcia Gray	Orlando Castle	Frank Lloyd	
1916	The Heart of Paula	Bruce McLean	William Desmond Taylor	
1919	The Thunderbolt	Spencer Vail	Colin Campbell	
1919	What Every Woman Wants	Philip Belden	Jesse D. Hampton	
1920	The Notorious Mrs. Sands	Ronald Cliffe	Christy Cabanne	
1920	The Misfit Wife	Peter Crandall	Edmund Mortimer	
1920	The Triflers	Monte Moreville	Christy Cabanne	
1921	Forbidden Fruit	Nelson Rogers	Cecil B. DeMille	
1921	Sacred and Profane Love	Samson	William Desmond Taylor	
1921	Enchantment	Ernest Eddison	Robert G. Vignola	
1921	Big Game	Larry Winthrop	Dallas M. Fitzgerald	
1922	When Knighthood Was in Flower	Charles Brandon	Robert G. Vignola	
1922	Beauty's Worth	Cheyne Rovein	Robert G. Vignola	
1922	The Young Diana	Commander Cleeve	Robert G. Vignola	
1922	The Pride of Palomar	Don Mike Farrell	Frank Borzage	
1923	Bavu	Mischa Vleck	Stuart Paton	
1923	Her Accidental Husband	Gordon Gray	Dallas M. Fitzgerald	
1923	Tiger Rose	Michael Devlin	Sidney Franklin	
1924	Through the Dark	Boston Blackie	George W. Hill	
1924	The Breath of Scandal	Gregg Mowbry	Louis J. Gasnier	
1925	Madame Sans-Gene		Léonce Perret	
1925	The Unwritten Law	Jack Wayne	Edward LeSaint	
1925	The Girl Who Wouldn't Work	William Norworth	Marcel De Sano	
1925	Up the Ladder	James Van Clinton	Edward Sloman	
1925	The Fate of a Flirt	James	Frank R. Strayer	
1925	Beauty and the Bad Man	Madoc Bill	William Worthington	
1926	Forest Havoc		Stuart Paton	
1926	Dancing Days	Ralph Hedman	Albert H. Kelley	
1926	Shadow of the Law	James Reynolds	Wallace Worsley	
1927	Eve's Love Letters	Adam, Husband	Leo McCarey	
1927	The Wheel of Destiny		Duke Worne	
1927	The Cat and the Canary	Charles Wilder	Paul Leni	
1928	Bare Knees	John Longworth	Erle C. Kenton	
1928	Jazzland	Hamilton Pew	Dallas M. Fitzgerald	
1928	The Phantom of the Turf	Dunbarton	Duke Worne	
1928	Into the Night	Gavin Murdock	Duke Worne	
1929	The Drake Case	District Attorney	Edward Laemmle	
1931	Arizona	Colonel Frank Bonham	George B. Seitz	
1932	Sin's Pay Day	James Markey	George B. Seitz	

== Selected television appearances ==
- (1955) Alfred Hitchcock Presents (S1E7) “Breakdown" as Hubka
- (1958) Gunsmoke (S3E38) “Overland Express" as Griffin
