= Passionate Youth =

1925 film

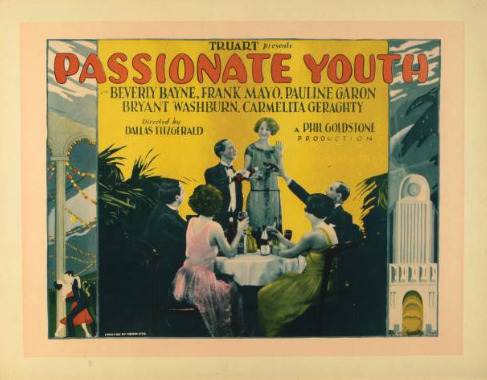
- Lobby card
- Directed by: Dallas M. Fitzgerald
- Written by: J. Grubb Alexander; Ben Allah
- Starring: Beverly Bayne; Frank Mayo; Pauline Garon
- Cinematography: Milton Moore
- Edited by: Jeanne Spencer
- Production company: Truart Film Corporation
- Distributed by: Truart Film Corporation
- Release date: June 28, 1925
- Running time: 60 minutes
- Country: United States
- Language: Silent (English intertitles)

Passionate Youth is a 1925 American silent drama film directed by Dallas M. Fitzgerald and starring Beverly Bayne, Frank Mayo, and Pauline Garon.

== Plot ==
As described in a film magazine reviews, Mary and John Rand have graduated from law school and, upon their marriage, John joins the ministry despite the objections of his wife. Their daughter, Henrietta, is neglected and enters a free life of jazz, drinking, and joy rides. Mary persuades John to permit her to get a divorce, so that she may practice law. After he has consented she joins Bruce Corbin and enters a campaign to be elected district attorney. With the help of Attorney Corbin, she is elected and falls in love with him. Corbin proves untrue and falls in love with Henrietta. Mary then demands that Corbin marry Henrietta with the threat that she will expose him in a crooked deal if he does not. Corbin is found dead. Henrietta is accused of murder and put on trial. John's divorce is discovered by his congregation and he is asked to leave the pulpit. Pleading that he be allowed to aid in the defense of his daughter, he obtains the testimony of Peggy, a gold digger, who saw Jimmy Wellington shoot Bruce Corbin in a fit of jealousy. Wellington had later gone to his death in an automobile accident. Mary realizes that her neglect of her daughter has led to the trouble and she returns to her husband. They are remarried.

== Cast ==
- Beverly Bayne as Mary Rand
- Frank Mayo as John Rand
- Pauline Garon as Henrietta Rand
- Bryant Washburn as Corbin
- Carmelita Geraghty as Peggy
- Ralph McCullough as Matt Rutherford
- Ernest Wood as Jimmy Wellington
- Lawrence Underwood as Prosecuting Attorney
- J.C. Fowler as District Attorney
- Walter Deming as Harry Perrin
- James McElhern as Deacon Collins
- William McIllwain as Judge Ford

== Bibliography ==
- Munden, Kenneth White. The American Film Institute Catalog of Motion Pictures Produced in the United States, Part 1. University of California Press, 1997.
