= Jazzland =

Jazzland may refer to:

- Jazzland (amusement park), an amusement park later known as Six Flags New Orleans
- Jazzland Records (American record label), a subsidiary of US-based Riverside Records founded in 1960
- Jazzland Recordings, a Norwegian record company founded in 1997
- Jazzland (film), an American film of 1928 starring Florence Turner
