= Milton Moore =

American cinematographer

- Born: February 8, 1884; Indiana, United States
- Died: August 18, 1956 (aged 72); Los Angeles, California, United States
- Occupations: Cinematographer, Writer
- Years active: 1915-1933 (film)
- Spouse: Laura Oakley

Milton Moore (1884–1956) was an American cinematographer of the silent era. He also worked on several screenplays. He collaborated a number of times with the director Dallas M. Fitzgerald.

== Selected filmography ==
- Love's Lariat (1916)
- The Vanishing Dagger (1920)
- Don't Get Personal (1922)
- The Guttersnipe (1922)
- Daughters of Today (1924)
- The Tomboy (1924)
- He Who Gets Slapped (1924)
- Passionate Youth (1925)
- Stella Maris (1925)
- The Goose Woman (1925)
- Josselyn's Wife (1926)
- That Model from Paris (1926)
- College Days (1926)
- Sin Cargo (1926)
- Redheads Preferred (1926)
- Lost at Sea (1926)
- The Earth Woman (1926)
- One Hour of Love (1927)
- Wilful Youth (1927)
- Out of the Past (1927)
- Web of Fate (1927)
- Woman's Law (1927)
- The First Night (1927)
- The Rose of Kildare (1927)
- The Girl He Didn't Buy (1928)
- Golden Shackles (1928)
- Maizie (1933)

== Bibliography ==
- Munden, Kenneth White. The American Film Institute Catalog of Motion Pictures Produced in the United States, Part 1. University of California Press, 1997.
