= A Perfect Gentleman (1928 film) =

1928 film directed by Clyde Bruckman

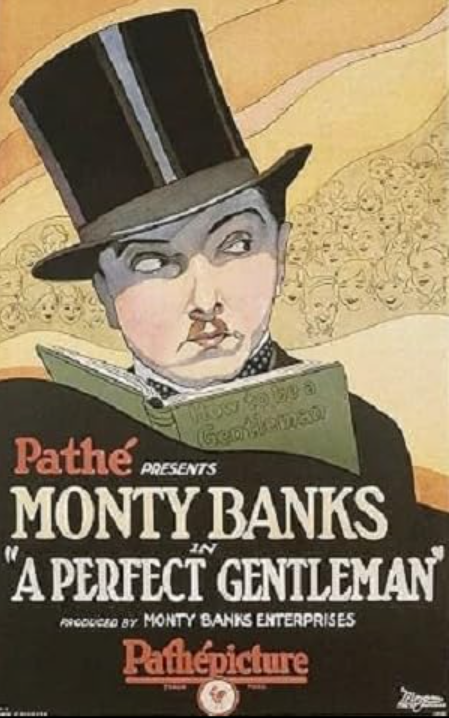
- Directed by: Clyde Bruckman
- Written by: Charles Horan
- Produced by: A. MacArthur
- Starring: Monty Banks; Ernest Wood; Henry Barrows; Ruth Dwyer
- Cinematography: James Diamond
- Edited by: William Holmes
- Production company: Monty Banks Enterprises
- Distributed by: Pathé Exchange
- Release date: January 15, 1928 (US)
- Running time: 6 reels
- Country: United States
- Language: Silent (English intertitles)

A Perfect Gentleman is a 1928 American silent comedy film, directed by Clyde Bruckman, which stars Monty Banks, Ernest Wood, Henry Barrows, and Ruth Dwyer.

== Cast list ==
- Monty Banks as Monty Brooks
- Ernest Wood as George Cooper
- Henry Barrows as John Wayne
- Ruth Dwyer as His daughter
- Arthur Thalasso as Ship's officer
- Hazel Howell as His wife
- Agostino Borgato as Barco
- Mary Foy as The Aunt
- Syd Crossley as The Valet
- Jackie Coombs as The Baby
