= Wilful Youth =

1927 film

- Directed by: Dallas M. Fitzgerald
- Written by: Gardner Bradford; Gladys Gordon; Ada McQuillan
- Produced by: Dallas M. Fitzgerald
- Starring: Edna Murphy; Kenneth Harlan; Jack Richardson
- Cinematography: Milton Moore
- Edited by: Desmond O'Brien
- Production company: Dallas M. Fitzgerald Productions
- Distributed by: Peerless Pictures
- Release date: December 19, 1927
- Running time: 60 minutes
- Country: United States
- Languages: Silent; English intertitles

Wilful Youth is a 1927 American silent drama film directed by Dallas M. Fitzgerald and starring Edna Murphy, Kenneth Harlan and Jack Richardson. It is based on the story "Whispering Pines" by Edith Sessions Tupper.

== Cast ==
- Edna Murphy as Edna Tavernay
- Kenneth Harlan as Jack Compton
- Jack Richardson as Edward Compton
- Walter Perry as Terrance Clang
- Jimmy Aubrey as Steve Daley
- James Florey as Bull Thompson
- Eugenie Forde as Mrs. Claudia Tavernay
- Arthur Morrison as Sheriff

== Bibliography ==
- Munden, Kenneth White. The American Film Institute Catalog of Motion Pictures Produced in the United States, Part 1. University of California Press, 1997.
