= Her Honor, the Governor =

1926 film

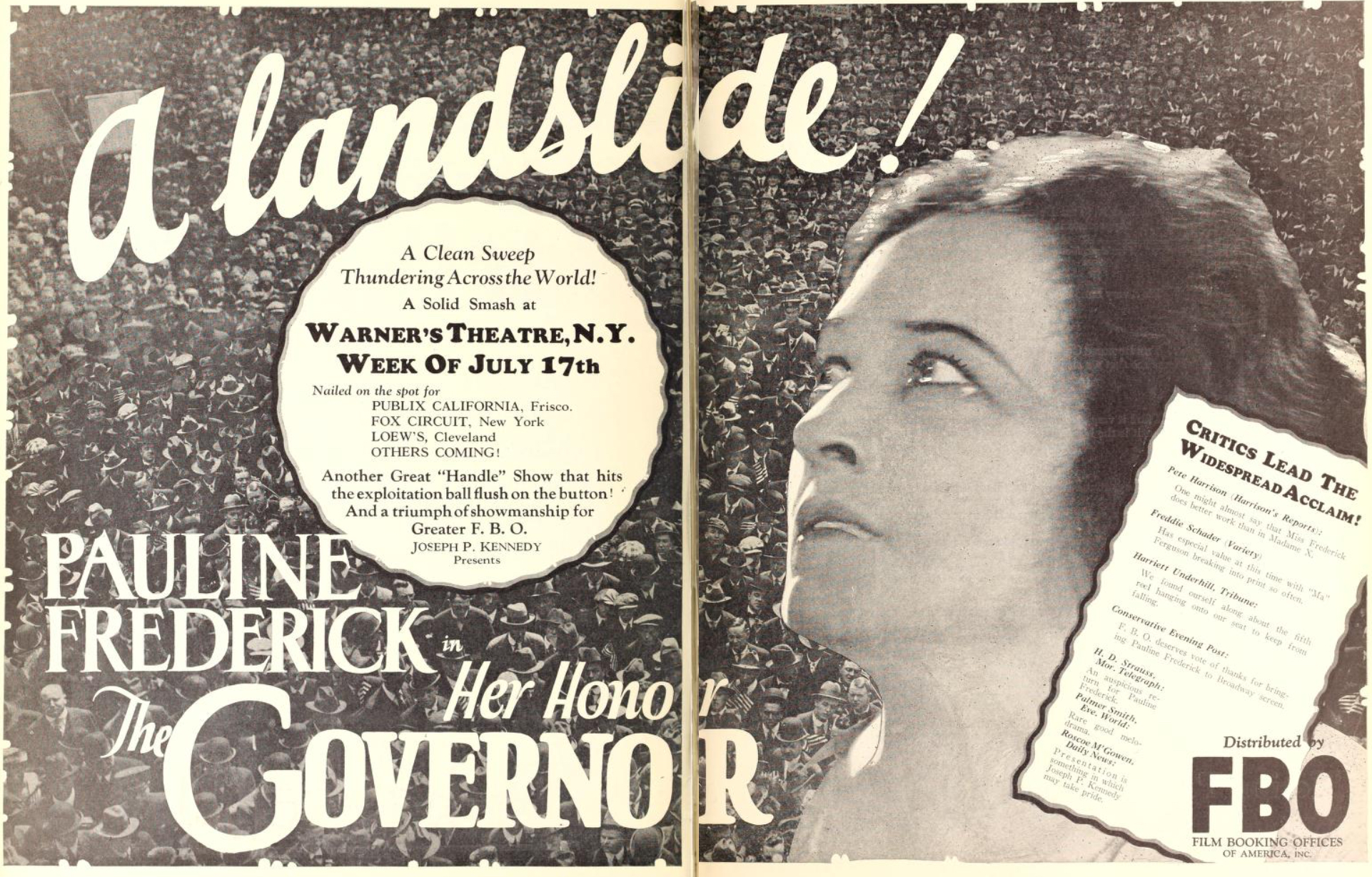
- Directed by: Chester Withey
- Written by: Doris Anderson; Hyatt Daab; Weed Dickinson
- Produced by: Joseph P. Kennedy
- Starring: Pauline Frederick; Carroll Nye
- Cinematography: André Barlatier
- Distributed by: Film Booking Offices of America
- Release date: July 19, 1926
- Running time: 70 minutes
- Country: United States
- Language: Silent (English intertitles)

Her Honor, the Governor is a 1926 American silent drama film starring Pauline Frederick, directed by Chester Withey and featuring Boris Karloff.

== Cast ==
- Pauline Frederick as Adele Fenway
- Carroll Nye as Bob Fenway
- Greta von Rue as Marian Lee
- Tom Santschi as Richard Palmer
- Stanton Heck as Jim Dornton
- Boris Karloff as Snipe Collins
- Jack Richardson as Slade
- Charles McHugh
- Kathleen Kirkham
- William Worthington

== Preservation ==
Complete prints of Her Honor, the Governor survive.

== See also ==
- Boris Karloff filmography
