= Carroll Nye =

American actor (1901–1974)

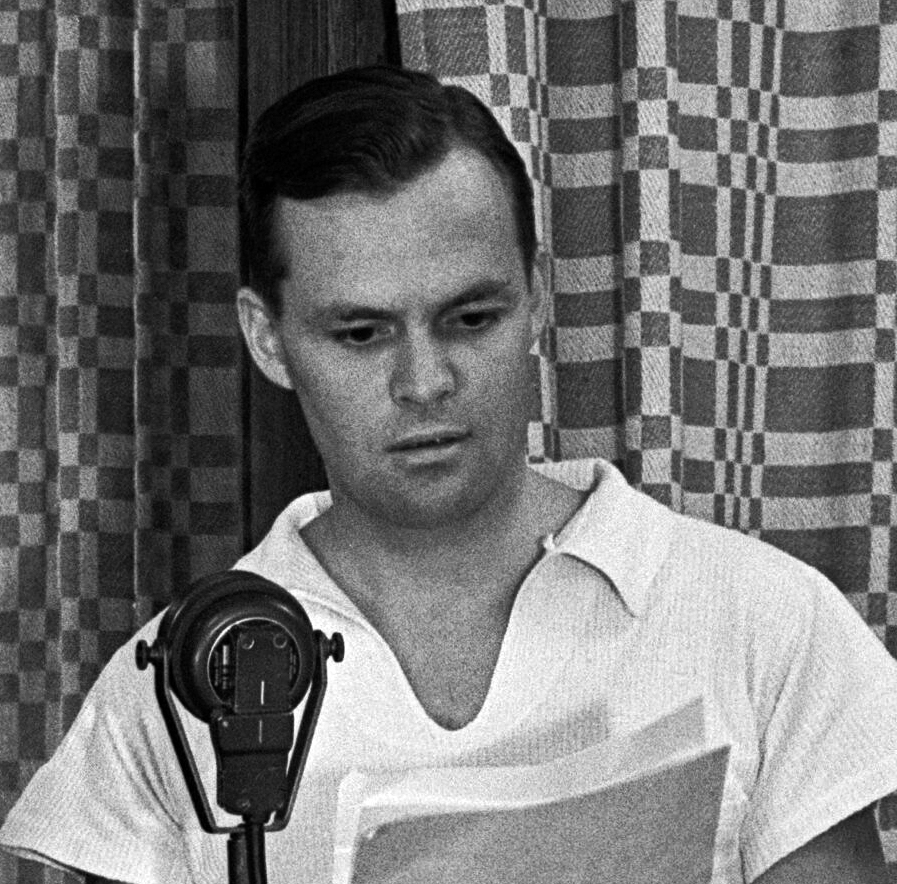
- Nye in 1935
- Born: Robert Carroll Nye; October 4, 1901; Akron, Ohio, U.S.
- Died: March 17, 1974 (aged 72); North Hollywood, California, U.S.
- Occupation: Actor
- Years active: 1925-1944
- Spouse: Helen Lynch (divorced)

Robert Carroll Nye (October 4, 1901 – March 17, 1974) was an American film actor. He appeared in more than 50 films between 1925 and 1944. His most memorable role was Frank Kennedy, Scarlett's second husband, in Gone with the Wind.

== Biography ==
Nye was born in Akron, Ohio on October 4, 1901. His mother, Myra Nye, was the club editor of the Los Angeles Times; his father, W. P. Nye, was postmaster in Covina, California. Nye attended Covina, California, schools and the University of California at Los Angeles.

Nye performed on stage at the Majestic Theater in Los Angeles from 1922 to 1925. He began working in films in June 1925. At the beginning of his career he had a score of leading man roles in Hollywood opposite such silent screen stars as Anita Page and Corinne Griffith. In his late career, he played usually small roles. His most memorable appearance was as Frank Kennedy, Scarlett's second husband and former love interest of her sister Suellen, in Gone with the Wind (1939). His film career ended in 1944 with an uncredited role in Wilson. Nye also worked with Groucho Marx at CBS.

After his film career, Nye served as a Hollywood journalist and publicity man. He married actress Helen Lynch in February 1928. and after her death he married Dorothy Nye, Nye died of a heart attack in Encino, California on March 17, 1974, at the age of 72.

== Partial filmography ==
- Three of a Kind (1925) - Don Gray
- Classified (1925) - Mart Comet
- The Earth Woman (1926) - Steve Tilden
- The Impostor (1926) - Dick Gilbert
- The Wolf Hunters (1926) - Roderick Drew
- Her Honor, the Governor (1926) - Bob Fenway
- Kosher Kitty Kelly (1926) - Barney Kelly
- Women's Open Golf Championship (1927) - Dave Sullivan
- The Brute (1927) - The El
- The Black Diamond Express (1927) - Fred
- The Heart of Maryland (1927) - Lloyd Calvert
- The Rose of Kildare (1927) - Larry Nunan
- Death Valley (1927) - Boy
- The Silver Slave (1927) - Larry Martin
- The Girl from Chicago (1927) - Bob Carlton
- Little Mickey Grogan (1927) - Jeffrey Shore
- A Race for Life (1928) - Robert Hammond
- The Sporting Age (1928) - Phillip Kingston
- Powder My Back (1928) - Jack Hale
- Rinty of the Desert (1928) - Pat
- Craig's Wife (1928) - John Fredericks
- The Perfect Crime (1928) - Trevor
- While the City Sleeps (1928) - Marty
- Land of the Silver Fox (1928) - Carroll Blackton
- Jazzland (1928) - Homer Pew
- The Flying Fleet (1929) - Tex (uncredited)
- The Devil Bear (1929) - Bert Sifton
- The Squall (1929) - Paul
- The Girl in the Glass Cage (1929) - Terry Pomfret
- Light Fingers (1929) - Donald Madison
- Madame X (1929) - Darrell
- Confession (1929)
- The Bishop Murder Case (1930) - John E. Sprigg
- Sons of the Saddle (1930) - Harvey
- The Lottery Bride (1930) - Nels
- King of the Wild (1931) - Tom Armitage
- The Lawless Woman (1931) - Allan Perry
- Hell-Bent for Frisco (1931) - Lane Garwood
- The One Way Trail (1931) - Terry Allen
- Neck and Neck (1931) - Frank Douglas
- Temptation's Workshop (1932)
- The Wolf Dog (1933) - Radio Announcer
- Traveling Saleslady (1935) - Burroughs
- The Crime of Dr. Forbes (1936) - Radio Announcer (uncredited)
- Sing, Baby, Sing (1936) - Radio Announcer (uncredited)
- Don't Turn 'Em Loose (1936) - Police Radio Broadcaster (uncredited)
- Mind Your Own Business (1936) - Radio Announcer (uncredited)
- We Who Are About to Die (1937) - Police Radio Dispatcher (uncredited)
- Sing and Be Happy (1937) - Announcer (uncredited)
- Hot Water (1937) - Radio Announcer (uncredited)
- Saturday's Heroes (1937) - First Football Broadcaster (uncredited)
- City Girl (1938) - Radio Commentator (uncredited)
- Rebecca of Sunnybrook Farm (1938) - Radio Announcer
- Kentucky Moonshine (1938) - Radio Announcer
- Safety in Numbers (1938) - Larsen
- The Main Event (1938) - Fight Announcer (uncredited)
- Hold That Co-ed (1938) - Radio Newscaster (uncredited)
- Gone with the Wind (1939) - Frank Kennedy - A Guest
- The Trail Blazers (1940) - Jim Chapman
- Blossoms in the Dust (1941) - Mr. Loring, Dora's Husband (uncredited)
- Wilson (1944) - Reporter (uncredited)
