= Edward Cecil (actor) =

American actor

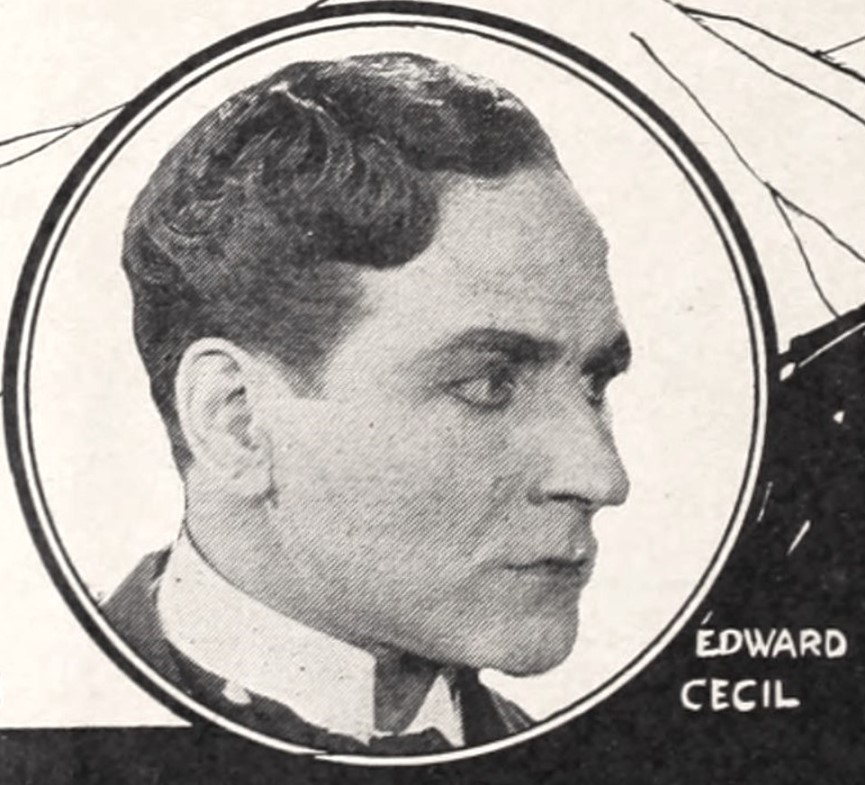
- From a 1924 advertisement
- Born: September 13, 1878; San Francisco, California, United States
- Died: December 13, 1940 (aged 62); Los Angeles, California, United States
- Occupation: Actor
- Years active: 1913-1940 (film)

Edward Cecil (September 13, 1878 – December 13, 1940) was an American film actor. During the silent era he played supporting roles and the occasion lead. Following the introduction of sound, he mainly appeared in more minor roles until his death.

== Selected filmography ==
- Père Goriot (1915)
- The Beast (1916)
- The Love Thief (1916)
- The Show Down (1917)
- The Yankee Way (1917)
- The Wildcat of Paris (1918)
- Bread (1918)
- Fast Company (1918)
- A Girl in Bohemia (1919)
- The Price of Redemption (1920)
- Blackmail (1920)
- Big Game (1921)
- The Love Gambler (1922)
- My Wild Irish Rose (1922)
- The Scarlet Car (1923)
- The Fast Express (1924)
- Secrets of the Night (1924)
- Hidden Loot (1925)
- The Canvas Kisser (1925)
- Wild Horse Canyon (1925)
- The Phantom of the Opera (1925)
- What Happened to Jones (1926)
- The Stolen Ranch (1926)
- The Fighting Doctor (1926)
- The Smoke Eaters (1926)
- Woman's Law (1927)
- Hoof Marks (1927)
- The Desert of the Lost (1927)
- The Midnight Adventure (1928)
- Jazzland (1928)
- Saddle Mates (1928)
- Silent Sentinel (1929)
- Guilty? (1930)
- Lotus Lady (1930)
- Resurrection (1931)
- The Secret Menace (1931)
- Servants' Entrance (1934)
- One More River (1934)
- Black Sheep (1935)
- His Fighting Blood (1935)
- The Cattle Thief (1936)
- Hollywood Boulevard (1936)
- Racketeers in Exile (1937)
- Riders of the Frontier (1939)
- Port of Hate (1939)
- Public Deb No. 1 (1940)
- Third Finger, Left Hand (1940)

== Bibliography ==
- Munden, Kenneth White. The American Film Institute Catalog of Motion Pictures Produced in the United States, Part 1. University of California Press, 1997.
