= The Guttersnipe =

1922 film

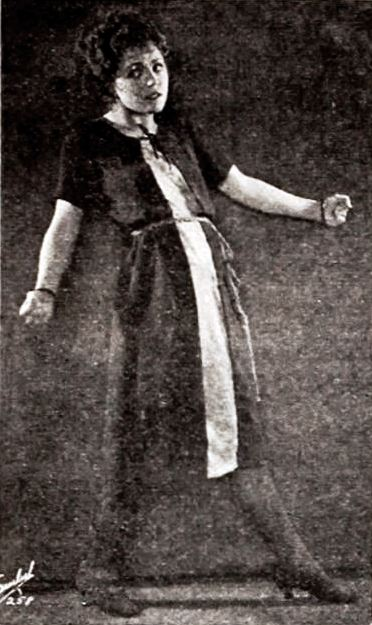
- Still with Gladys Walton
- Directed by: Dallas M. Fitzgerald
- Screenplay by: Wallace C. Clifton
- Story by: Percival Wilde
- Starring: Gladys Walton; Walter Perry; Kate Price; Jack Perrin; Sidney Franklin; Carmen Phillips
- Cinematography: Milton Moore
- Production company: Universal Film Manufacturing Company
- Distributed by: Universal Film Manufacturing Company
- Release date: January 30, 1922
- Running time: 50 minutes
- Country: United States
- Language: Silent (English intertitles)

The Guttersnipe is a 1922 American romance film directed by Dallas M. Fitzgerald and written by Wallace C. Clifton. The film stars Gladys Walton, Walter Perry, Kate Price, Jack Perrin, Sidney Franklin, and Carmen Phillips. The film was released on January 30, 1922, by Universal Film Manufacturing Company.

== Cast ==
- Gladys Walton as Mazie O'Day
- Walter Perry as Dennis O'Day
- Kate Price as Mrs. O'Day
- Jack Perrin as Tom Gilroy
- Sidney Franklin as Sam Rosen
- Carmen Phillips as Lady Clarissa
- Edward Cecil as Lord Bart
- Hugh Saxon as Angus
- Seymour Zeliff as Red Galvin
- Gino Corrado as Clarence Phillips
- Lorraine Weiler as Sally
- Christian J. Frank as Gregory
