= The Lookout Girl =

1928 film

- Directed by: Dallas M. Fitzgerald
- Written by: Adrian Johnson (scenario); Tom Miranda (Titles)
- Based on: Alice Ross Colver (novel)
- Produced by: A. Carlos Productions
- Starring: Jacqueline Logan; Ian Keith
- Cinematography: Faxon M. Dean; Chandler House
- Edited by: M. McKay
- Distributed by: Quality Distributing
- Release date: November 1, 1928
- Running time: 55 minutes
- Country: USA
- Language: Silent..English titles

The Lookout Girl is a surviving 1928 silent film mystery directed by Dallas M. Fitzgerald and starring Jacqueline Logan.

== Cast ==
- Jacqueline Logan - Dixie Evans
- Ian Keith - Dean Richardson
- William H. Tooker - Dr.
- Lee Moran - Pete Mowbray
- Gladden James - Bob Conway
- Henry Hebert - Sheriff
- Jimmy Aubrey - Dean's Valet
- Broderick O'Farrell - Banker Hargrave
- Jean Huntley - Nurse
- Geraldine Leslie - Modiste
