= His New York Wife =

1926 film

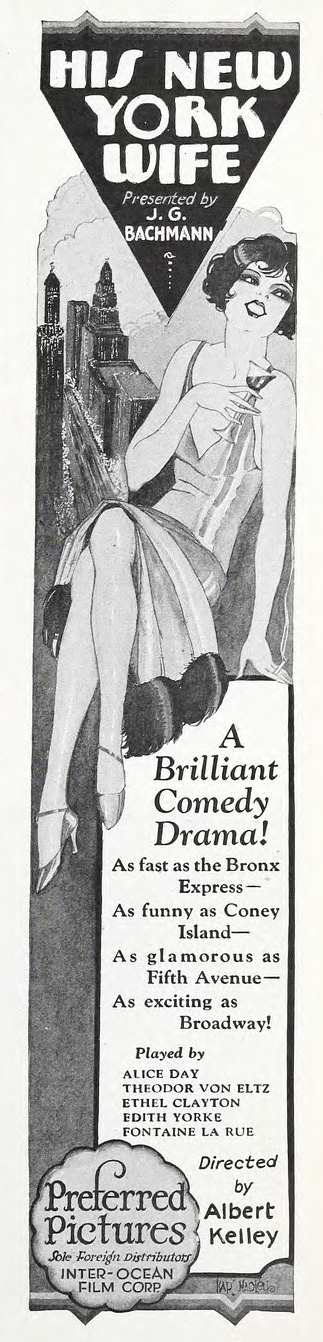
- Directed by: Albert H. Kelley
- Written by: Leon Abrams
- Produced by: J. G. Bachmann
- Starring: Alice Day; Theodore von Eltz; Ethel Clayton
- Cinematography: Nicholas Musuraca
- Production company: B. P. Schulberg Productions
- Distributed by: Preferred Pictures
- Release date: November 1, 1926
- Running time: 60 minutes
- Country: United States
- Languages: Silent; English intertitles

His New York Wife is a 1926 American silent drama film directed by Albert H. Kelley and starring Alice Day, Theodore von Eltz and Ethel Clayton.

== Cast ==
- Alice Day as Lila Lake
- Theodore von Eltz as Philip Thorne
- Ethel Clayton as Alicia Duval
- Fontaine La Rue as Julia Hewitt
- Charles Cruz as Jimmy Duval
- Edith Yorke as Lila's aunt

== Bibliography ==
- Munden, Kenneth White. The American Film Institute Catalog of Motion Pictures Produced in the United States, Part 1. University of California Press, 1997.
