= The Fate of a Flirt =

1925 film directed by Frank R. Strayer

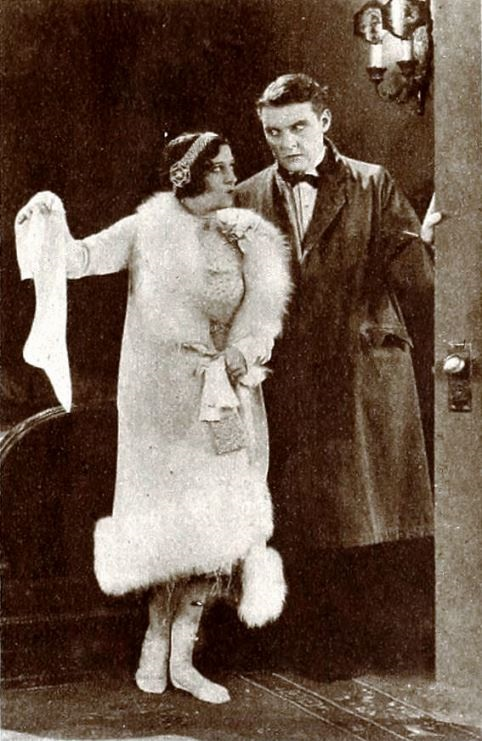
- Still with Revier and Stanley
- Directed by: Frank R. Strayer
- Screenplay by: Albert Lewin; Malcolm S. Boylan
- Story by: Janet Crothers
- Produced by: Harry Cohn
- Starring: Dorothy Revier; Forrest Stanley; Thomas Ricketts
- Cinematography: Sam Landers
- Edited by: Charles J. Hunt
- Production company: Waldorf Productions
- Distributed by: Columbia Pictures
- Release date: November 15, 1925 (US)
- Running time: 6 reels
- Country: United States
- Language: Silent (English intertitles)

The Fate of a Flirt is a 1925 American silent romantic comedy film directed by Frank R. Strayer, which stars Dorothy Revier, Forrest Stanley, and Thomas Ricketts. It was released by Columbia Pictures on November 15, 1925.

== Plot ==
As described in a film magazine review, Sir James Gilbert, a British peer, wagers that he can win the love of a particular young American woman for whom he has his heart set. Disguised as a chauffeur, James shows his love to Mary Burgess, niece of his wealthy employer, John Burgess. To obtain the consent of Mary's aunt, the couple involves her in a harmless trick. A villain threatens blackmail and attempts to pass himself off as the Sir James Gilbert. After a variety of adventures, the blackmailer's schemes are defeated. The young woman's hitherto hostile relatives are surprised and pleased when, instead of a chauffeur, Mary becomes the bride of Sir Gilbert.

== Cast list ==
- Dorothy Revier as Mary Burgess
- Forrest Stanley as Sir James Gilbert
- Thomas Ricketts as Uncle John Burgess
- Phillips Smalley as Sir Horace Worcester
- William Austin as Riggs
- Clarissa Selwynne as Aunt Louise Burgess
- Charles West as Eddie Graham
- Louis Payne as Simpson

== Reception ==
The Chat (Brooklyn, New York), gave the film a positive review, saying it was a "comedy drama" with "side-splitting situations". The Bridgeport Telegram also gave the picture a good review, stating, "Director Frank Strayer was given this Janet Crothers story and was told to make it into a picture that would be memorable in every sense of picture excellence. Director Strayer followed his instructions."

== Preservation and status ==
Complete copies of the film are held at the Cinematheque Royale de Belgique and the Museum of Modern Art.
