= Myra Nye =

American writer, journalist, and clubwoman (1875–1955)

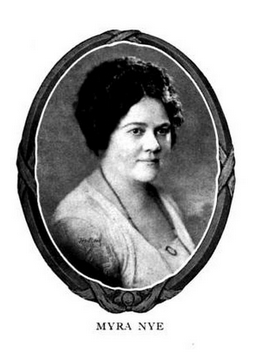
Myra Nye, from a 1922 publication

Myra Sturtevant Nye (May 12, 1875 – January 28, 1955) was a writer, journalist, and clubwoman based in Southern California. She was the women's club editor and Hollywood columnist at the Los Angeles Times from 1919 to 1934.

== Early life ==
Myra Bell Sturtevant was born in 1875, in Cleveland, Ohio. Her parents were William Sturtevant and Mary Davis Sturtevant. Myra Sturtevant graduated from Oberlin College in 1896.

== Career ==
Myra Sturtevant first moved to California in 1896 with her father, and returned with husband and her first two children in 1901. She helped to organize the Glendora Women's Club, and was the group's first vice president.

From 1919 to 1934, she was the women's club editor at the Los Angeles Times. She also wrote the column "Society of Cinemaland". She covered other events as well, including a lecture on quantum theory by Charles Darwin's grandson at the Ebell Club, of which she wrote, "When Charles Darwin, long ago, advanced his evolution theory he could have created no greater bewilderment than did his grandson yesterday." She served a term as president of the Southern California Women's Press Club.

Myra Nye wrote a historical novel, Heart of Gold (1912), and forty short stories, most of them with California historical settings. She taught evening writing classes in Covina after she retired from newspaper work.

== Personal life ==
Myra Sturtevant married William Putnam Nye, a druggist, in Oberlin, Ohio in 1898. They had four children. Their son Carroll Nye had a notable career in Hollywood. Another son, Wilbur S. Nye, was a writer. She was also active with the Covina chapter of the Daughters of the American Revolution, and in local theatrical productions. She and her son Ralph Nye also made and marketed several flavors of marmalade as "Myra Nye Marmalade", in the 1940s.

Myra Nye was widowed in 1947, and died in Glendora, California in 1955, aged 79 years.
