= My Lady of Whims =

1925 film by Dallas M. Fitzgerald

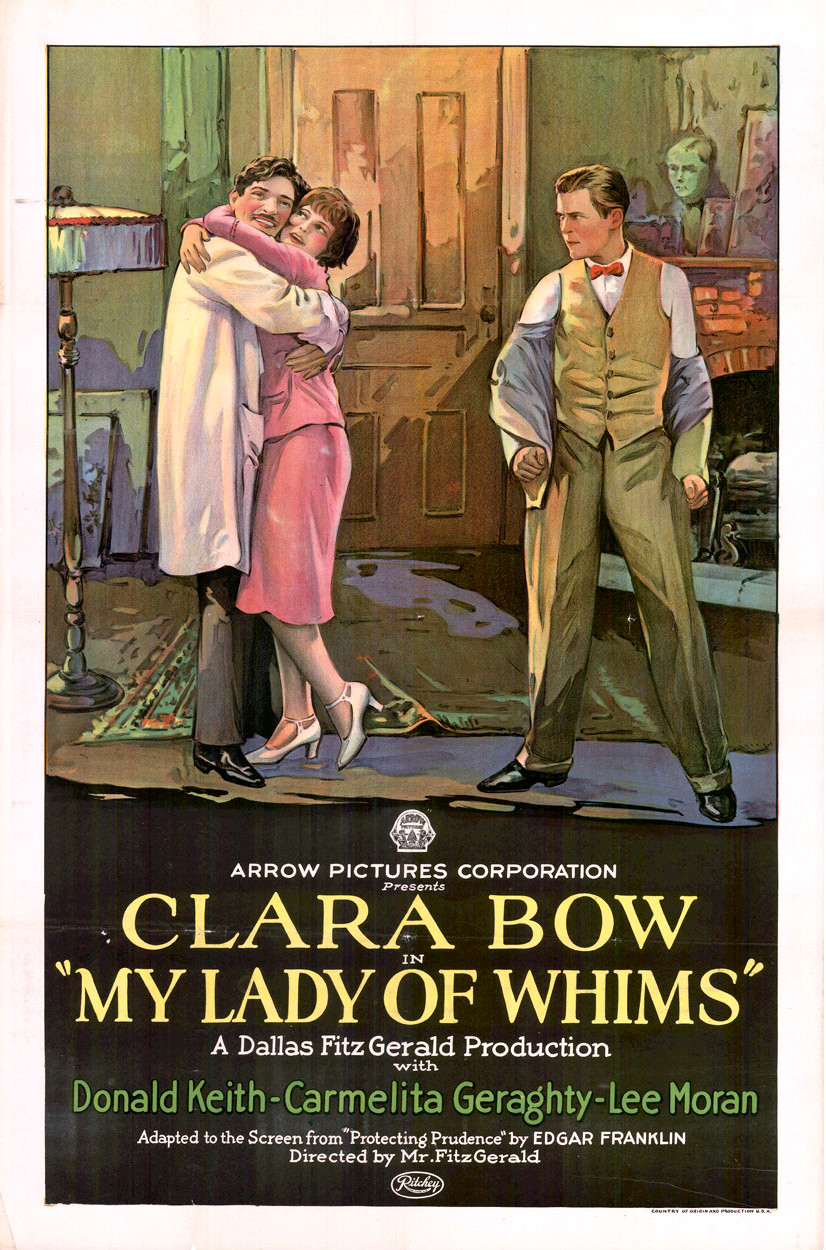
- Film poster
- Directed by: Dallas M. Fitzgerald
- Written by: Doris Schroeder
- Based on: "Protecting Prudence" by Edgar Franklin
- Produced by: Dallas Fitzgerald Prods.
- Starring: Clara Bow
- Cinematography: Jack Young
- Distributed by: Arrow Film Corporation
- Release date: December 25, 1925
- Running time: 7 reels (approximately 70 minutes)
- Country: United States
- Language: Silent (English intertitles)

My Lady of Whims is a 1925 American silent comedy film directed by Dallas M. Fitzgerald. The film was originally seven reels, but a shortened five reel version survives. This film starred Clara Bow at age 20. The ending scene from the film was used in the music video for Queen and David Bowie's song Under Pressure.

== Plot ==
Two "ex-doughboys" Bartley Greer and Dick Flynn, are up for any dangerous mission that comes their way, and one does in the form of a request from father and elder sister Mary Severn to rescue daughter/younger sister Prudence Severn from the clutches of the wild bohemian life in Greenwich Village. "Prue" wants to become an author and is rooming with gal pal artist Wayne Leigh in a studio in the Village. Greer quickly befriends Prue, but the friendship sours when she discovers that he is working on behalf of her father. She literally returns to the embrace of Rolf, a bohemian watercolorist, and eludes Greer to go to a scandalous costume party with Rolf wearing a skintight costume (scandalous even by contemporary flapper standards). "The skintight, transparent dress Bow wears during the party sequence caused a sensation at the time of the film's release; the Cedar Rapids Tribune said it made 'the eyes of every flapper bulge.'" In a bid to permanently get rid of Greer and further interference from her father, Prue resolves to elope with Rolf and get married on a yacht sailing to international waters. By a stroke of luck, Greer discovers her plan and is hot in her wake to stop the ceremony before it's too late.

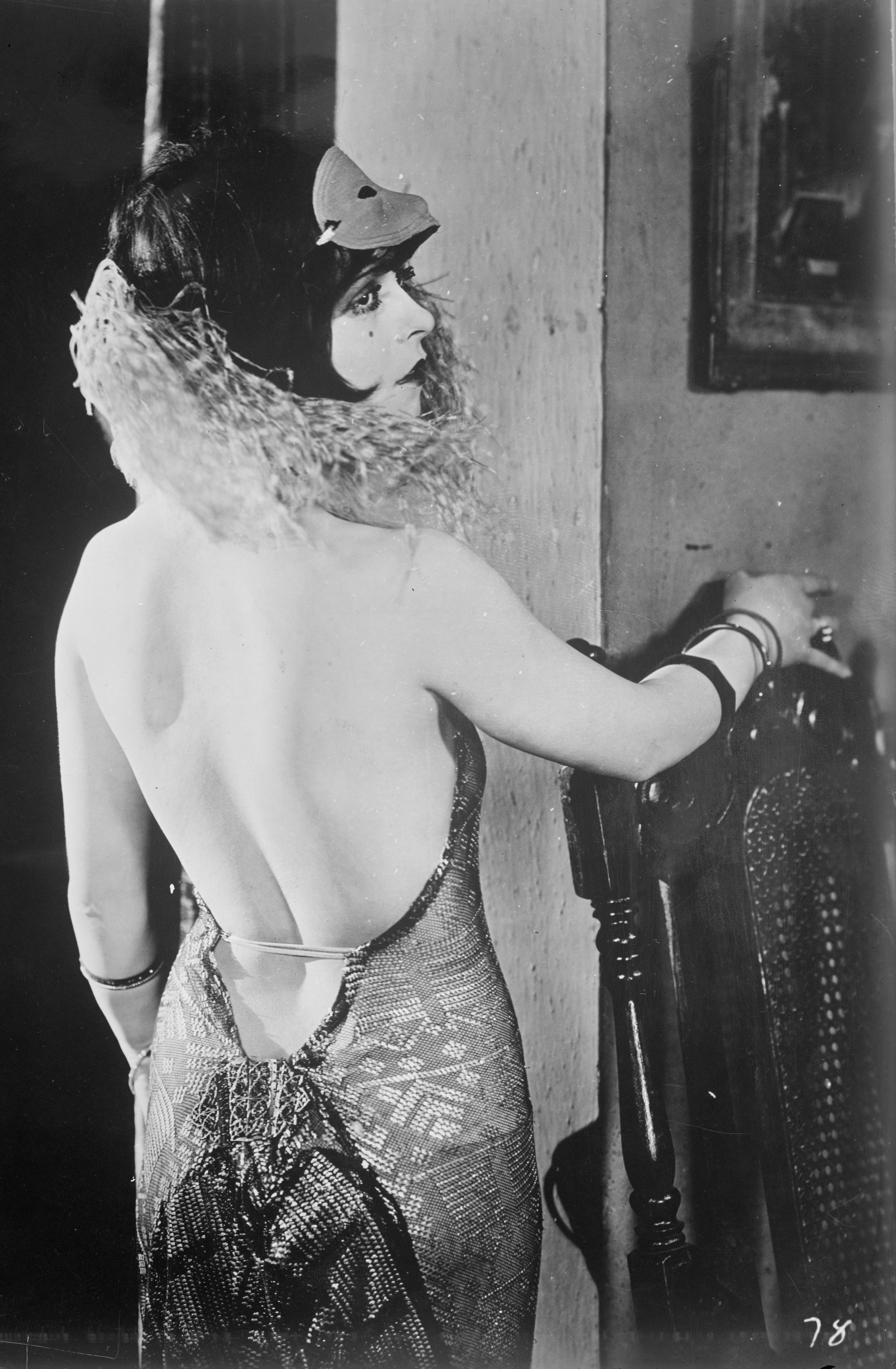
The Scandalous Skintight Costume

== Cast ==
- Clara Bow as Prudence Severn
- Donald Keith as Bartley Greer
- Carmelita Geraghty as Wayne Leigh
- Francis McDonald as Rolf
- Lee Moran as Dick Flynn
- Betty Baker as Mary Severn
- John Cossar as Severn
- Lux MacBride as Yacht Captain
- Robert Rose as Sneath
