= Not Damaged =

1930 film

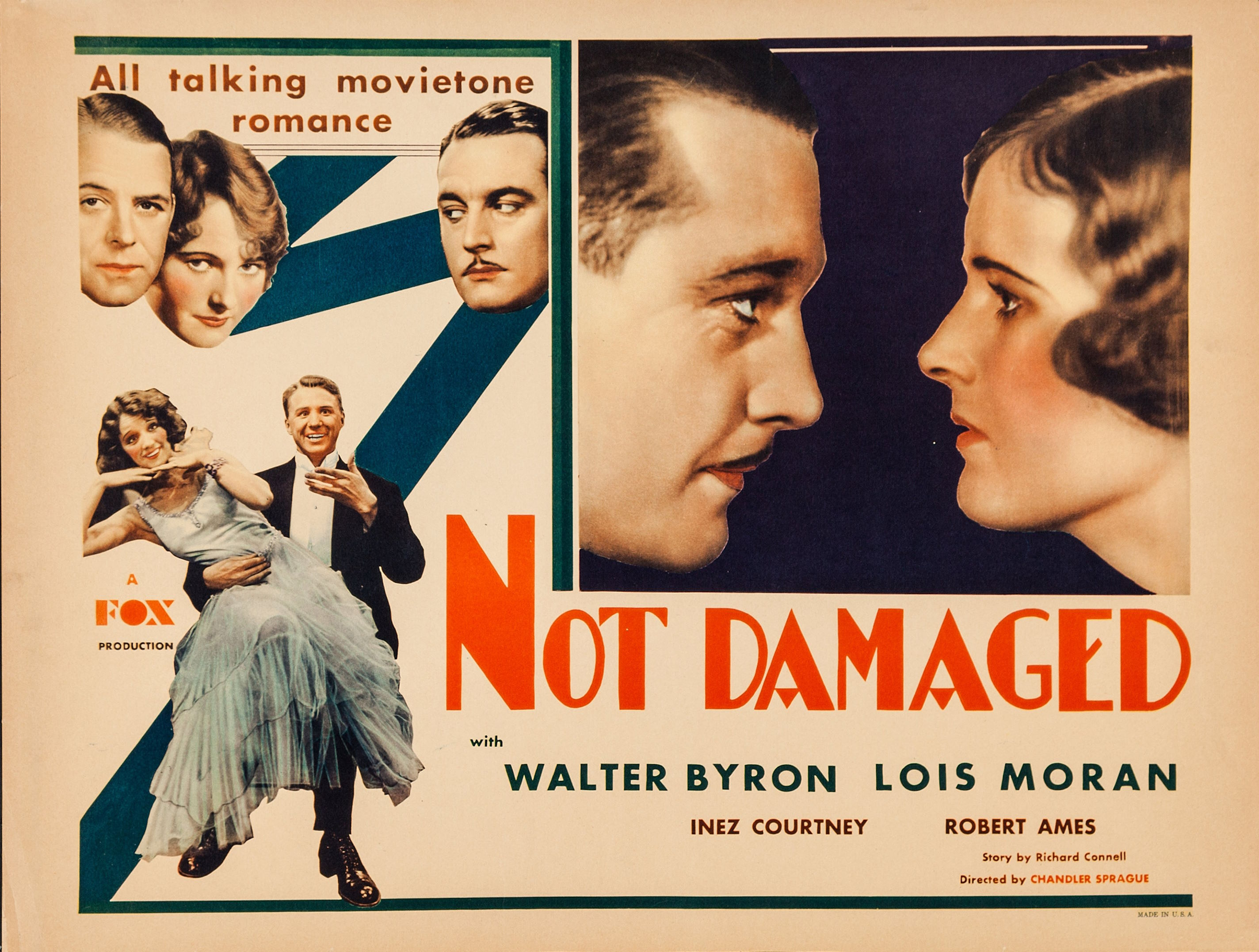
- Lobby card
- Directed by: Chandler Sprague
- Screenplay by: Harold R. Atteridge; Frank Gay
- Based on: The Solid Gold Article by Richard Connell
- Starring: Lois Moran; Walter Byron; Robert Ames; Inez Courtney; George Corcoran; Rhoda Cross
- Cinematography: Chester A. Lyons
- Edited by: Alex Troffey
- Production company: Fox Film Corporation
- Distributed by: Fox Film Corporation
- Release date: May 25, 1930
- Running time: 72 minutes
- Country: United States
- Language: English

Not Damaged is a 1930 American pre-Code romantic comedy film directed by Chandler Sprague and written by Harold R. Atteridge and Frank Gay. The film stars Lois Moran, Walter Byron, Robert Ames, Inez Courtney, George Corcoran and Rhoda Cross. The film was released on May 25, 1930, by Fox Film Corporation.

== Cast ==
- Lois Moran as Gwen Stewart
- Walter Byron as Kirk Randolph
- Robert Ames as Charlie Jones
- Inez Courtney as Maude Graham
- George Corcoran as Elmer
- Rhoda Cross as Jennie
- Ernest Wood as Peebles
