= Out of the Past (1927 film) =

1927 film

- Directed by: Dallas M. Fitzgerald
- Written by: John S. Lopez; H. Tipton Steck
- Produced by: Dallas M. Fitzgerald
- Starring: Robert Frazer; Mildred Harris; Joyzelle Joyner
- Cinematography: Milton Moore
- Production company: Dallas M. Fitzgerald Productions
- Distributed by: Peerless Pictures
- Release date: September 26, 1927
- Running time: 60 minutes
- Country: United States
- Languages: Silent; English intertitles

Out of the Past is a 1927 American silent drama film directed by Dallas M. Fitzgerald and starring Robert Frazer, Mildred Harris and Joyzelle Joyner.

== Cast ==
- Robert Frazer as Beverley Carpenter
- Mildred Harris as Dora Prentiss
- Ernest Wood as Harold Nesbitt
- Rose Tapley as Mrs. Prentiss
- Mario Marano as Juan Sorrano
- Joyzelle Joyner as Saida
- Harold Miller as Capt. John Barrister
- Byron Sage as Beverley Carpenter Jr.

== Bibliography ==
- Munden, Kenneth White. The American Film Institute Catalog of Motion Pictures Produced in the United States, Part 1. University of California Press, 1997.
