= Whistlin' Dan =

1932 film directed by Phil Rosen

- Original film poster
- Directed by: Phil Rosen
- Written by: Stuart Anthony
- Produced by: Phil Goldstone
- Starring: Ken Maynard; Joyzelle Joyner; Georges Renavent
- Cinematography: Ira Morgan
- Edited by: Rose Loewinger
- Production companies: Quadruple Film Corp.; Tiffany Productions
- Distributed by: Tiffany Productions
- Release date: March 20, 1932 (US)
- Running time: 65 minutes
- Country: United States
- Language: English

Whistlin' Dan is a 1932 American pre-Code Western film directed by Phil Rosen and starring Ken Maynard, Joyzelle Joyner (wife of Phil Rosen), and Georges Renavent. It was released on March 20, 1932, by Tiffany Productions. It was re-released in 1937 by Amity Pictures.

The film was a remake of Buck Jones' 1931 Border Law with Jones remaking it again as The Fighting Ranger (1934).

== Plot ==
Three cowpokes have just returned from a cattle drive with a check for $5000 that they immediately use to pay off their large loan and buy supplies with the small remainder for their next drive. A spy for the evil outlaw Serge Karloff overhears the news about the money from Bob, one of the cowpokes, as he rides off to Mexico to see his girlfriend.

Karloff's gang ambushes and captures the cowpoke, but discovers the money has been given to the bank. Karloff sends word to Dan and July, his captive's two friends, that if they don't get the $5000 back from the bank and bring it to a prearranged location in Mexico, they will kill their captive.

Dan and July are frantic when the bank won't return their money, so they rob the bank and flee to Mexico. They arrive too late and discover Karloff's gang has murdered their friend. They return to the US to return the money to the bank, but the heartless bank owner still wants to press charges. They share a cell with a member of the Karloff gang who, when he hears that the pair have been arrested for bank robbery, insists on them joining Karloff's gang after they raid the jail to free him.

Once embedded with Karloff at his Mexican hideout, Dan picks off the gang one by one while romancing the dancer Carmelita, and ultimately confronts Karloff himself.

== Cast ==
- Ken Maynard as Dan Savage
- Joyzelle as Carmelita
- Georges Renavent as Serge Karloff
- Harlan Knight as July
- Don Terry as Bob
- Jack Rockwell as Cal Webster
- Jessie Arnold as Horty
