= Dancing Days (film) =

1926 film

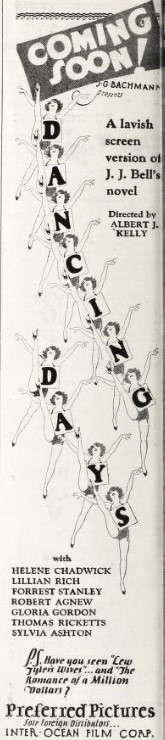
- Advertisement
- Directed by: Albert H. Kelley
- Written by: Dorothy Cairns
- Based on: Dancing Days by J.J. Bell
- Produced by: J. G. Bachmann
- Starring: Helene Chadwick; Forrest Stanley; Lillian Rich
- Cinematography: H. Lyman Broening
- Production company: B. P. Schulberg Productions
- Distributed by: Preferred Pictures
- Release date: September 27, 1926
- Running time: 65 minutes
- Country: United States
- Language: Silent (English intertitles)

Dancing Days is a 1926 American silent romantic drama film directed by Albert H. Kelley and starring Helene Chadwick, Forrest Stanley, and Lillian Rich. It is based on the 1910 novel of the same name by the British writer J.J. Bell. The films depicts a married man who falls in love with a flapper, and is increasingly dominated by his new love interest.

== Synopsis ==
After ten years of marriage to Alice, Ralph Hedman is introduced by his brother to the flapper Lillian Loring and his eye begins to wander. The new woman seems to have complete control over him. When he falls ill, she tries to recover him by getting him to dance the Charleston. Alice accepts defeat, but a chance car accident brings them back together.

== Cast ==
- Helene Chadwick as Alice Hedman
- Forrest Stanley as Ralph Hedman
- Gloria Gordon as Maid
- Lillian Rich as Lillian Loring
- Robert Agnew as Gerald Hedman
- Tom Ricketts as Stubbins
- Sylvia Ashton as Katinka

== Preservation ==
Prints of Dancing Days are held in the collections of the Museum Of Modern Art and Library and Archives Canada.

== Bibliography ==
- Connelly, Robert B. The Silents: Silent Feature Films, 1910-36, Volume 40, Issue 2. December Press, 1998.
- Munden, Kenneth White. The American Film Institute Catalog of Motion Pictures Produced in the United States, Part 1. University of California Press, 1997.
