= Stage Kisses =

1927 film

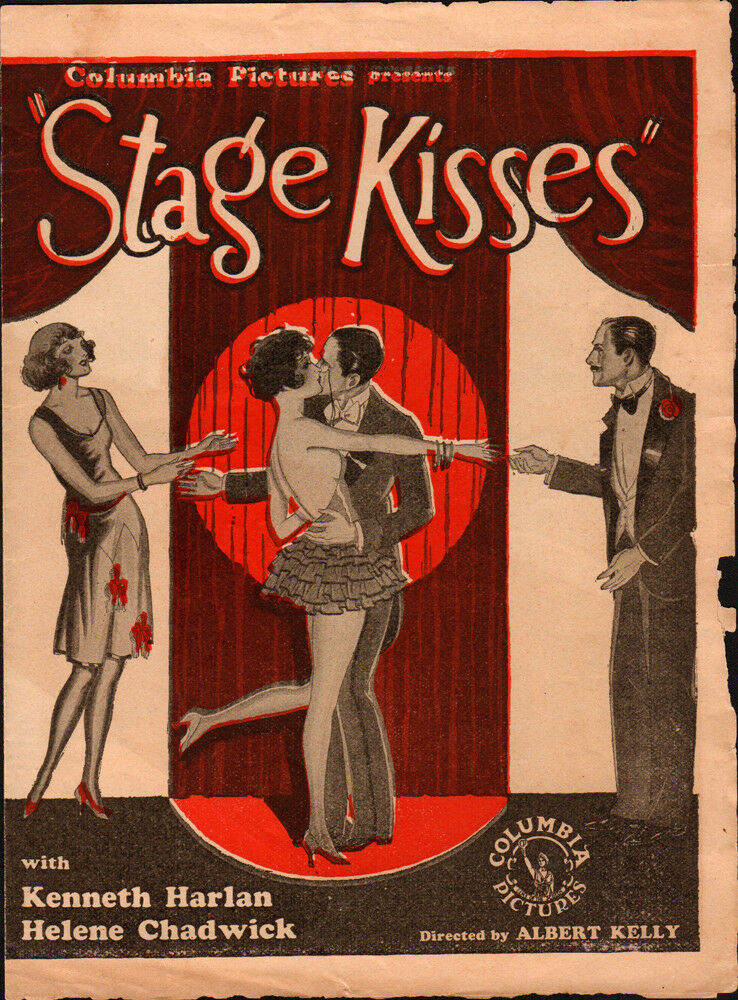
- Directed by: Albert H. Kelley
- Written by: Dorothy Howell
- Produced by: Harry Cohn
- Starring: Kenneth Harlan; Helene Chadwick; Phillips Smalley
- Cinematography: Joseph Walker
- Production company: Columbia Pictures
- Distributed by: Columbia Pictures
- Release date: November 2, 1927
- Running time: 56 minutes
- Country: United States
- Languages: Silent; English intertitles

Stage Kisses is a lost 1927 American silent drama film directed by Albert H. Kelley and starring Kenneth Harlan, Helene Chadwick and Phillips Smalley.

== Synopsis ==
A wealthy man falls in love with an actress and marries her despite the fierce opposition of his mother. Later the mother plots to make it look as if her daughter-in-law is having an affair and break up the couple.

== Cast ==
- Kenneth Harlan as Donald Hampton
- Helene Chadwick as Fay Leslie
- John Patrick as Keith Carlin
- Phillips Smalley as John Clarke
- Ethel Wales as Mrs. John Clarke
- Frances Raymond as Mrs. Hampton

== Censorship ==
Before Stage Kisses could be exhibited in Kansas, the Kansas Board of Review required the reduction of a struggle scene by removing the part where a man kisses a woman's neck.

== Bibliography ==
- Munden, Kenneth White. The American Film Institute Catalog of Motion Pictures Produced in the United States, Part 1. University of California Press, 1997.
