= The Rose of Kildare =

1927 film

- Directed by: Dallas M. Fitzgerald
- Written by: Gerald Beaumont; Garrett Graham; Harold Shumate
- Produced by: Samuel Sax
- Starring: Helene Chadwick; Pat O'Malley; Henry B. Walthall
- Cinematography: Milton Moore
- Production company: Gotham Productions
- Distributed by: Lumas Film Corporation
- Release date: August 15, 1927
- Running time: 70 minutes
- Country: United States
- Languages: Silent; English intertitles

The Rose of Kildare is a 1927 American silent romance film directed by Dallas M. Fitzgerald and starring Helene Chadwick, Pat O'Malley and Henry B. Walthall. An Irish singer arrives at the gold mining town of Kimberley in South Africa, where she encounters a former lover who left Kildare to seek his fortune. The film is believed to be lost, with no prints of the film existing in archives.

== Cast ==
- Helene Chadwick as Eileen O'Moore
- Pat O'Malley as Barry Nunan
- Henry B. Walthall as Bob Avery
- Lee Moran as 'The Kid'
- Ed Brady as Ed Brady
- Ena Gregory as Elsie Avery
- Carroll Nye as Larry Nunan

== Bibliography ==
- Munden, Kenneth White. The American Film Institute Catalog of Motion Pictures Produced in the United States, Part 1. University of California Press, 1997.
