= Ada McQuillan =

American screenwriter

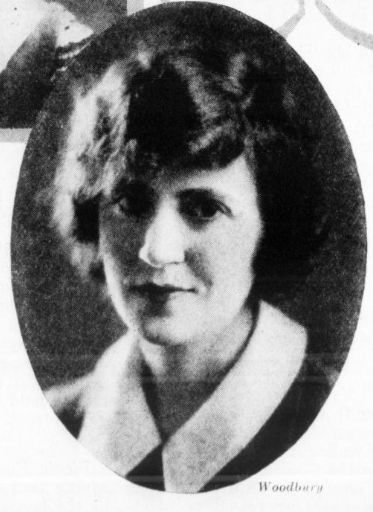
- Occupation: Screenwriter

Ada McQuillan was an American screenwriter active during Hollywood's silent era. On many of her screenplays, she collaborated with fellow writer Gladys Gordon.

During World War I, McQuillan managed twenty stenographers and clerk, but struggled to find work after the war as she was not a trained stenographer. She re-trained in shorthand, later becoming a scenario editor at Frank Lloyd Productions. Her first major work as a screen writer was Lloyd's The Wise Guy, for which she was wrote what the Los Angeles Evening Citizen News termed "many of the impressive human touches" in the film. The same decade, she wrote with Harvey Thew on a script for Playing Around.

== Selected filmography ==
- Jazzland (1928)
- The Girl He Didn't Buy (1928)
- Golden Shackles (1928)
- Wilful Youth (1927)
- Web of Fate (1927)
- The Wise Guy (1926)
