= Double Cross (1941 film) =

1941 film by Albert H. Kelley

- Directed by: Albert H. Kelley
- Written by: John A. Albert (story); Milton Raison (screenplay) and Ron Ferguson (screenplay)
- Produced by: John G. Bachmann
- Starring: See below
- Cinematography: Arthur Martinelli
- Edited by: William Austin
- Distributed by: Producers Releasing Corporation
- Release date: June 27, 1941
- Running time: 61 minutes 29 minutes (American edited TV version)
- Country: United States
- Language: English

Double Cross is a 1941 American Producers Releasing Corporation crime film directed by Albert H. Kelley and starring serial star Kane Richmond. The film is also known as Motorcycle Squad (American 16mm rental title).

== Plot ==
When a nightclub that also features illegal gambling is raided by the police, uniformed motorcycle policeman Steve Bronson is in an adjoining room to the main area with his girlfriend, Fay Saunders, who is a co-owner of the club with Nick Taggart. When Fay sees several policemen scuffling with Nick she grabs Steve's revolver and shoots one of the policemen. The other policemen return fire mortally wounding Steve whilst Fay places the revolver next to him and declares she saw Steve fire on the police.

Steve's best friend is fellow motorcycle policeman Jim Murray, the son of a police captain who is the scourge of the city's criminals and corrupt politicians. Jim plans to infiltrate the nightclub to discover the truth about Steve's innocence with the help of his fiancée and Steve's sister Ellen. Jim begins to behave disgracefully that leads him to be drummed out of the police force. Fay, Nick and his criminal associates see Jim as an opportunity to gain information on police activities as well as to embarrass Jim's father Captain Murray who has already been the target of an unsuccessful assassination attempt. Fay begins to fall in love with Jim; Nick gathers some insurance for his future by clandestinely recording Fay's admitted it was she who shot the policeman in the raid.

When Nick catches Ellen taking a photograph of the mayor of the city accepting money from him he captures her and also catches on to Jim's true loyalties. He concocts a scheme to eliminate both of them by blaming the zealous "shoot first, ask questions later," Captain Murray.

== Cast ==
- Kane Richmond as Jim Murray
- Pauline Moore as Ellen Bronson
- Wynne Gibson as Fay Saunders
- John Miljan as Nick Taggart
- Richard Beach as Steve Bronson
- Mary Gordon as Mrs. Murray
- Robert Homans as Police Capt. Murray
- William Halligan as Mayor
- Frank Moran as Henchman Cookie
- Heinie Conklin as Henchman Miggs
- Daisy Ford as Nurse
- Edward Keane as Police Commissioner Bob Trent
- Walter Shumway as Sergeant Tucker
- Ted Wray as Police Sgt. Rand
- Jimmie Fox as Camera Shop owner
- Charles F. Miller as John Frawley
