= John Cossar =

English actor

John Hay Cossar
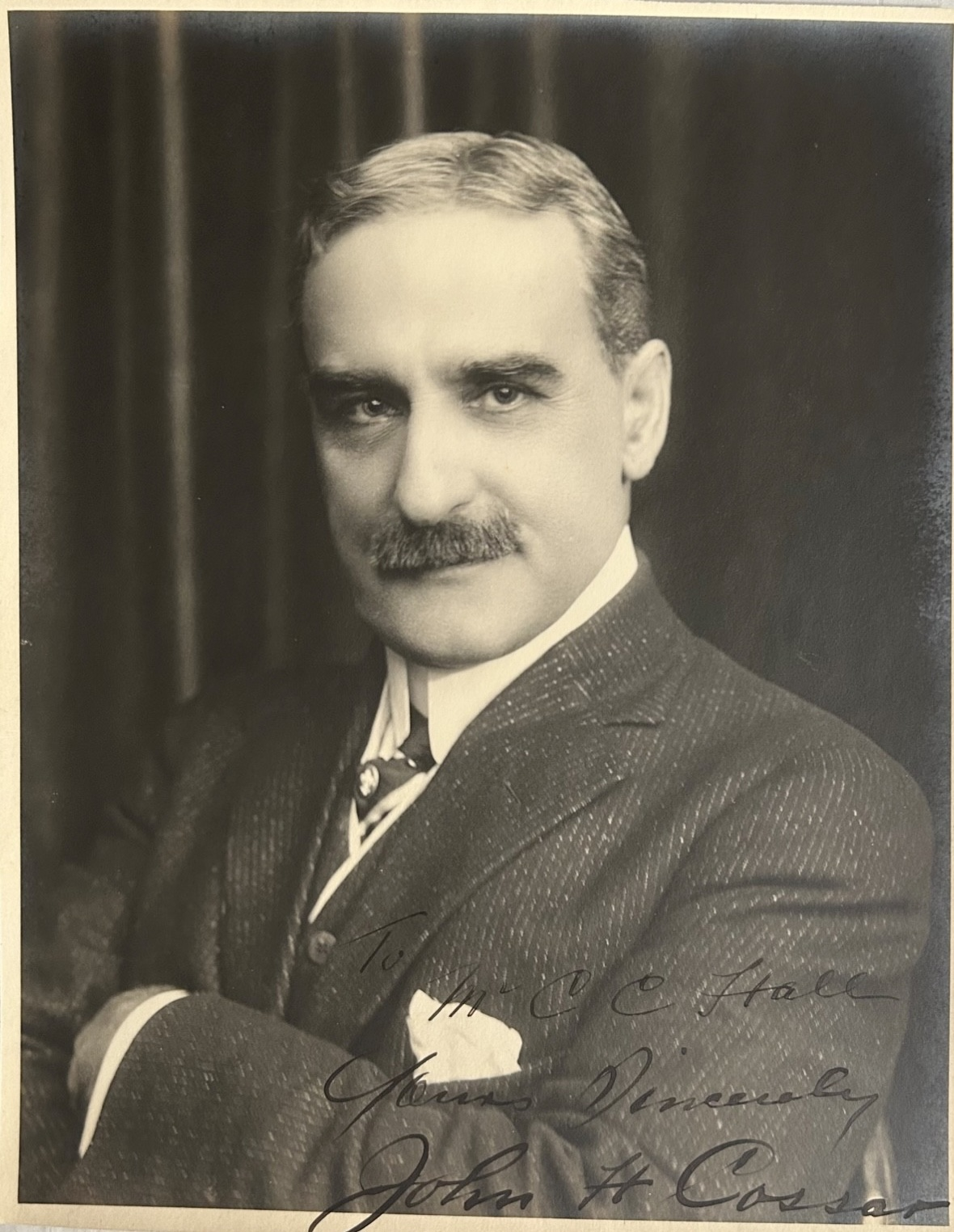
- John H. Cossar
- Born: 2 January 1858; London, England, UK
- Died: 28 April 1935 (aged 77); Hollywood, California, US
- Occupation: Actor
- Years active: 1914–29

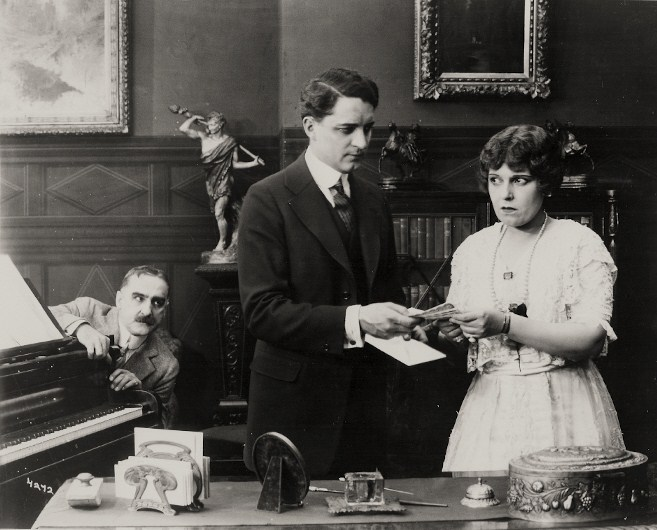
Cossar (left) with Bryant Washburn and Anne Leigh in The Alster Case (1915)

John Hay Cossar (2 January 1858 – 28 April 1935) was an actor of the silent era. From England, He appeared in more than 140 films between 1914 and 1929.

== Biography ==
John H Cossar was born in London, England. He was the fifth child of Walter Cossar and his wife Kate Lyster. Walter was in the Royal Marines between 1835 and 1863. In 1865 the family travelled to Canada and thence to Chicago, Illinois in the United Stares where John's older brother Walter Lyster Cossar later became City Editor of the Chicago Evening Journal.

In 1896, John married Fanny Cohen in Chicago. Fanny was also an actor and the 1930 census of Los Angeles shows them living with two children, Phyllis and Raymond. He died in Hollywood, California, in 1935.

== Partial filmography ==
- One Wonderful Night (1914)
- The White Sister (1915)
- The Alster Case (1915)
- The Strange Case of Mary Page (1916)
- The Prince of Graustark (1916)
- The Misleading Lady (1916)
- The Trufflers (1917)
- On Trial (1917)
- Gift O' Gab (1917)
- A Pair of Sixes (1918)
- The Marriage Ring (1918)
- Her Country First (1918)
- Common Clay (1919)
- Thieves (1919)
- When Fate Decides (1919)
- Vagabond Luck (1919)
- Made in Heaven (1921)
- Voices of the City (1921)
- The Poverty of Riches (1921)
- Hearts and Masks (1921)
- Watch Your Step (1922)
- Thorns and Orange Blossoms (1922)
- When Husbands Deceive (1922)
- Grand Larceny (1922)
- The Ghost Patrol (1923)
- The Hunchback of Notre Dame (1923)
- The Steel Trail (1923)
- The Fast Express (1924)
- My Lady of Whims (1925)
- The Sap (1926)
- The House Without a Key (1926)
- Melting Millions (1927)
- Web of Fate (1927)
- Woman's Law (1927)
- The Fire Detective (1929)
