= Mazie (film) =

Maizie
- Directed by: Dallas M. Fitzgerald
- Written by: Frank Gay
- Produced by: Dallas M. Fitzgerald
- Starring: Dorothy Lee; Lee Moran; John Darrow
- Cinematography: Milton Moore
- Edited by: S. Edwin Graham
- Production company: Plymouth Pictures Corporation
- Release date: 1933
- Running time: 63 minutes
- Country: United States
- Language: English

Maizie is a 1933 American drama film directed by Dallas M. Fitzgerald and starring Dorothy Lee, Lee Moran and John Darrow. It was shot at studios in Fort Lee in New Jersey.

== Cast ==
- Dorothy Lee as Mazie
- Lee Moran as Mike McCann
- Katharine Ellis as Edith Stone
- John Darrow as Boyd Kenton
- LeRoy Mason as Paul Barnes
- Walter Miller as Jason Steele
- William H. Strauss as Mr. Webber
- Connie Elliott as Irene Murphy
- Gladden James as Crook
- Henry Hall as Customer

== Bibliography ==
- Jamie Brotherton & Ted Okuda. Dorothy Lee: The Life and Films of the Wheeler and Woolsey Girl. McFarland, 2013.
