= Big Game (1921 film) =

1921 film

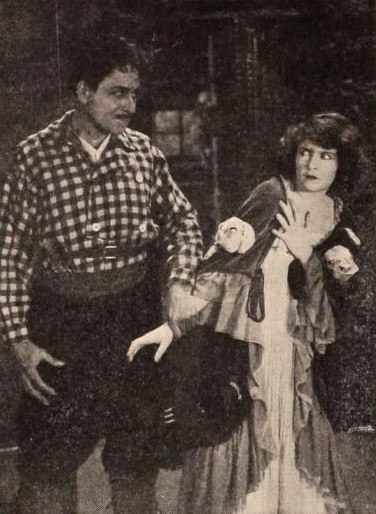
- Directed by: Dallas M. Fitzgerald
- Written by: Kilbourn Gordon (play); Willard Robertson (play); Edward T. Lowe Jr.
- Starring: May Allison; Forrest Stanley; Edward Cecil
- Cinematography: Jackson Rose
- Production company: Metro Pictures
- Distributed by: Metro Pictures
- Release date: August 16, 1921
- Running time: 6 reels
- Country: United States
- Languages: Silent; English intertitles

Big Game is a 1921 American silent drama film directed by Dallas M. Fitzgerald and starring May Allison, Forrest Stanley and Edward Cecil.

== Cast ==
- May Allison as Eleanor Winthrop
- Forrest Stanley as Larry Winthrop
- Edward Cecil as Jean St. Jean
- Zeffie Tilbury as Aunt Sarah Winthrop
- William Elmer as Spike McGafney
- Sidney D'Albrook as Henri Baptiste

== Bibliography ==
- Munden, Kenneth White. The American Film Institute Catalog of Motion Pictures Produced in the United States, Part 1. University of California Press, 1997.
