= J. G. Bachmann =

Russian-born American film producer (1891–1952)

- Born: May 1, 1891; Russian Empire
- Died: June 10, 1952 (aged 61); Hollywood, California, United States
- Other name: John G. Bachmann
- Occupation: Producer
- Years active: 1926–1941

J. G. Bachmann (1891–1952) was a Russian-born American film producer. Amongst the studios he was involved with were Preferred Pictures, Paramount and RKO. His son Lawrence Bachmann also became a film producer.

== Selected filmography ==
- The Romance of a Million Dollars (1926)
- His New York Wife (1926)
- Lew Tyler's Wives (1926)
- Dancing Days (1926)
- Shameful Behavior? (1926)
- The Docks of New York (1928)
- Interference (1928)
- The Last Command (1928)
- Nothing but the Truth (1929)
- Redskin (1929)
- The Love Doctor (1929)
- The Secret Witness (1931)
- Strange Justice (1932)
- Goldie Gets Along (1933)
- Man Hunt (1933)
- Eight Bells (1935)
- Double Cross (1941)

== Bibliography ==
- Kellow, Brian. The Bennetts: An Acting Family. University Press of Kentucky, 2004.
- Pitts, Michael R. Thrills Untapped: Neglected Horror, Science Fiction and Fantasy Films, 1928-1936. McFarland, 2018.
- Turk, Edward Baron. Hollywood Diva: A Biography of Jeanette MacDonald. University of California Press, 1998.
