= Light Fingers (film) =

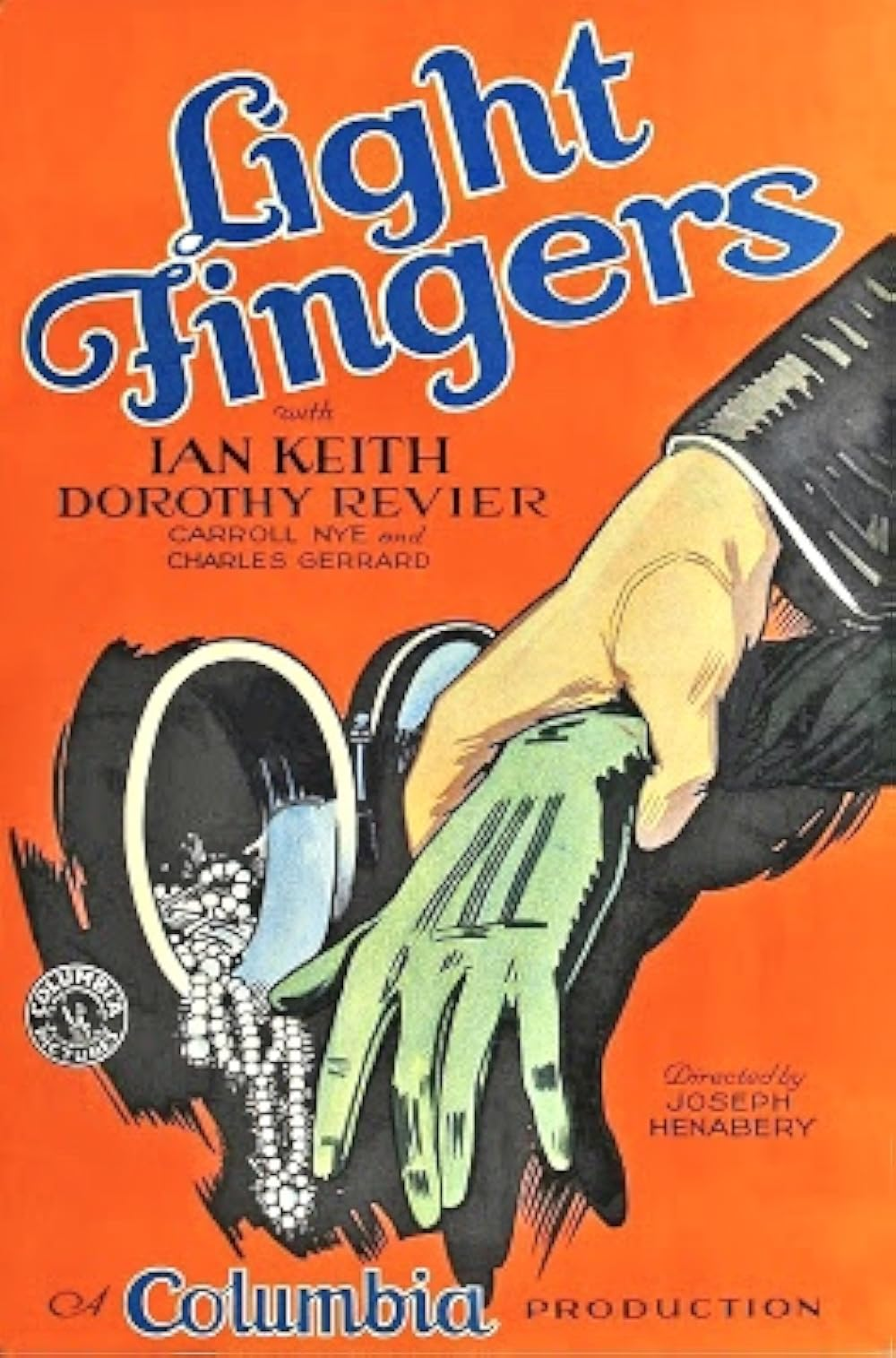
- Directed by: Joseph Henabery
- Written by: John F. Natteford; Alfred Henry Lewis
- Produced by: Harry Cohn
- Starring: Ian Keith; Dorothy Revier; Carroll Nye
- Cinematography: Ted Tetzlaff
- Production company: Columbia Pictures
- Distributed by: Columbia Pictures
- Release date: July 29, 1929
- Running time: 60 minutes
- Country: United States
- Languages: Sound (All-Talking); English Intertitles

Light Fingers is a 1929 American sound all-talking pre-Code sound drama film directed by Joseph Henabery. The audio was recorded via the Western Electric sound-on-film process. The film was produced by Harry Cohn for Columbia Pictures.

== Plot ==
Light Fingers (Ian Keith), an international jewel thief of suave manners and polished appearance, sets his sights on the mansion of wealthy Edward Madison (Tom Ricketts), famed for his collection of rare gems. Rather than force an entry, Light Fingers employs charm and deception: posing as a magazine writer preparing an article about the Madison jewels, he gains admission to the household. His banter is urbane, every line carrying a sly double meaning understood only by the audience—while he flatters his hosts, he is simultaneously gathering information to aid in a planned robbery.

Edward Madison shares his household with his ward, Dorothy Madison (Dorothy Revier), and her brother Donald Madison (Carroll Nye). Dorothy is spirited and intelligent, while Donald is weak-willed and irresponsible, a gambler whose stock-market losses have left him desperate. Dorothy keeps a careful eye on her brother, fearing his recklessness may one day disgrace the family.

One evening, Dorothy catches Donald attempting to steal his uncle's jewels to cover his debts. She intercepts him just in time, pleading with him to abandon his folly. Watching unseen, Light Fingers realizes the family's vulnerabilities—and also senses Dorothy's strength of character. When she later discovers his own interest in the jewels, the two share a tense but strangely mutual understanding. Dorothy is unwilling to expose him, and he, captivated by her beauty and integrity, begins to reconsider his path as a criminal.

Meanwhile, Madison's jewels have drawn the attention not only of Light Fingers’ own gang but also of Detective Kerrigan (Ralph Theodore), a sharp investigator who suspects the household is being watched. Kerrigan lingers about the estate, convinced that a heist is imminent. Light Fingers, now half in love with Dorothy, warns his associates that the robbery must be called off. But the gang, led by the ruthless London Tower (Charles Gerrard), disregards him and goes ahead with the plan.

Late at night, the gang breaks into the Madison residence. Dorothy, startled, catches sight of the intruders and raises the alarm. Before the police can arrive, Light Fingers seizes the jewels from the gang, his quick action foiling their escape. A wild car chase follows, Light Fingers in one car pursuing his erstwhile companions in another, until he manages to recover the stolen gems.

When he returns to the Madison home, however, Light Fingers is caught red-handed with the jewels. To Kerrigan and the police, the evidence is damning: the gentleman crook seems at last unmasked. Dorothy steps forward at the critical moment, insisting that he is not with the robbers at all, but rather has saved her uncle's treasures from them. Her word and Light Fingers’ gallantry sway the authorities, though Kerrigan remains skeptical.

Later, Dorothy thanks Light Fingers in private. She admits she had doubted him when she thought he had broken his word and turned criminal again, but now she sees his true character. The gentleman thief, softened by her faith and affection, vows to renounce his old life for good. In the garden, away from the turmoil, Dorothy forgives him fully and confesses her love. The crook-hero who once lived by sleight of hand has found redemption through the heart of a woman.

== Cast ==
- Ian Keith as Light Fingers
- Dorothy Revier as Dorothy Madison
- Carroll Nye as Donald Madison
- Ralph Theodore as Kerrigan
- Tom Ricketts as Edward Madison
- Charles Gerrard as London Tower
- Pietro Sosso as The Butler

== Production ==
Production for Light Fingers began by Columbia Pictures on June 3, 1929. Antonio Moreno was first booked to play the leading male role, but due to a schedule conflict with a different production he was in, Moreno was replaced by Ian Keith.

John Francis Natteford wrote the screenplay. He stated that the title character was based on a criminal that Natteford encountered when he worked as a court reporter for a New York newspaper. Before the release of the film, various newspapers stated that the title character was adapted from the stage play, Raffles, which included John Barrymore as the lead.

== See also ==
- List of early sound feature films (1926–1929)
