= The Vanishing Frontier =

1932 film

- Directed by: Phil Rosen
- Screenplay by: Stuart Anthony
- Produced by: Sam Jaffe
- Starring: Johnny Mack Brown; Evalyn Knapp; ZaSu Pitts; Raymond Hatton; Ben Alexander; J. Farrell MacDonald; Wallace MacDonald
- Cinematography: James S. Brown Jr.
- Production company: Paramount Pictures
- Distributed by: Paramount Pictures
- Release date: July 29, 1932
- Running time: 65 minutes
- Country: United States
- Language: English

The Vanishing Frontier is a 1932 American pre-Code historical western adventure film directed by Phil Rosen, written by Stuart Anthony, and starring Johnny Mack Brown, Evalyn Knapp, ZaSu Pitts, Raymond Hatton, Ben Alexander, J. Farrell MacDonald and Wallace MacDonald. It was released on July 29, 1932, by Paramount Pictures.

== Synopsis ==
In 1850 California is now under the control of American troops under the domineering military governor General Winfield following the Mexican American War. American rancher Kirby Tornell leads a band of guerillas against the authorities, who have persecuted both the Mexican inhabitants and American civilian settlers. He falls in love with Carol, the general's daughter, but is captured and needs to be rescued.

== Cast ==
- Johnny Mack Brown as Kirby Tornell
- Evalyn Knapp as Carol Winfield
- ZaSu Pitts as Aunt Sylvia
- Raymond Hatton as Hornet O'Lowery
- Ben Alexander as Lucien Winfield
- J. Farrell MacDonald as Waco
- Wallace MacDonald as Captain Roger Kearney
- George Irving as General Winfield
- Joyzelle Joyner as Dolores
- Sam McDaniel as Whistlin' Zeke
- Soledad Jiménez as Mama Valdez
