= Gladys Gordon =

British novelist and screenwriter

- Other names: G.G. Pendarves; Gladys Gordon Trenery
- Occupations: Screenwriter, author

Gladys Gordon (aka G.G. Pendarves, Gladys Gordon Trenery and Marjory E. Lambe, lived 1885–1938) was an English novelist and screenwriter active during Hollywood's silent era.

== Biography ==
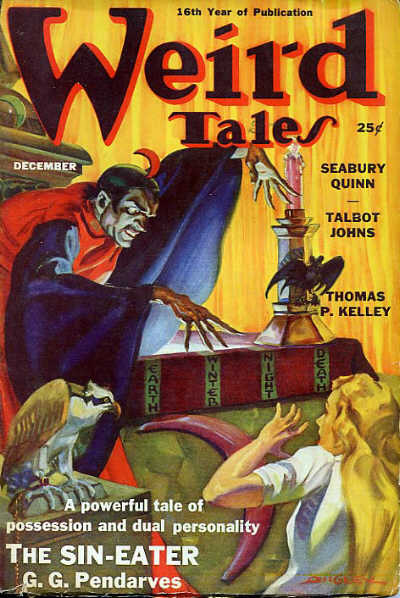
Weird Tales, December 1938 issue featuring "The Sin-Eater."

Gordon was born in England in 1885. On all of her screenplays, she collaborated with fellow writer Ada McQuillan. Under her "G.G. Pendarves" name, Gordon was known for her short stories on the occult and ghosts, which were published in the pulp magazine Weird Tales. Gordon also wrote adventure fiction about the exploits of Westerners in North Africa; these were published in the pulp magazines Oriental Stories and The Magic Carpet Magazine.

Gordon died in late 1938, in The Wirral, Cheshire. In the December 1938 issue of Weird Tales, editor Farnsworth Wright published an obituary for her, revealing that "G. G. Pendarves" had been Gordon's pseudonym.

== Selected filmography ==
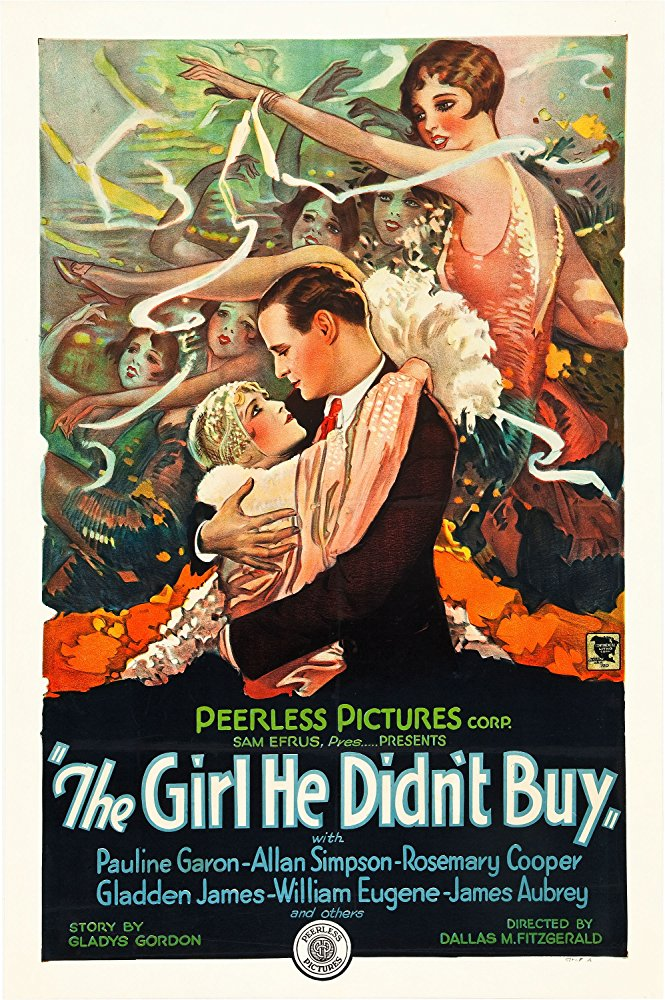
The Girl He Didn't Buy, (1928).

- The Girl He Didn't Buy (1928)
- Golden Shackles (1928)
- Wilful Youth (1927)
- Web of Fate (1927)

== Selected bibliography ==
=== Short fiction ===
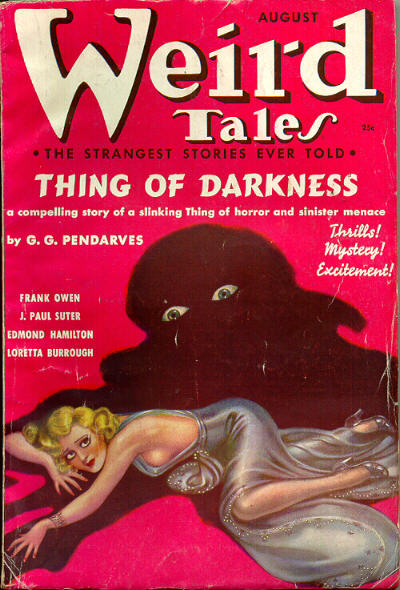
Weird Tales, August 1937 issue featuring "Thing of Darkness." Cover art by Margaret Brundage.

- The Return (1924)
- The Devil's Graveyard (1924)
- The Power of the Dog (1927)
- The Lord of the Tarn (1927)
- The Eighth Green Man (1928)
- The Ruler of Zem-Zem (1928)
- The Doomed Treveans (1928)
- The Laughing Thing (1929)
- The Grave at Goonhilly (1930)
- The Footprint (1930)
- The Black Camel (1930)
- The Veiled Leopard (1930)
- Thirty Pieces of Silver (1931)
- The Secret Trail (1931)
- El Hamel, the Lost One (1932)
- The Djinnee of El Sheyb (1932)
- From the Dark Halls of Hell (1932)
- The Altar of Melek Taos (1932)
- Abd Dhulma, Lord of Fire (1933)
- Passport to the Desert (1934)
- Werewolf of the Sahara (1936)
- The Dark Star (1937)
- The Whistling Corpse (1937)
- Thing of Darkness (1937)
- The Black Monk (1938)
- The Sin-Eater (1938)
- The Withered Heart (1939)

=== Collections ===
- Pendarves, G. G. Thing of Darkness. Midnight House, Seattle, Wash., 2005. ISBN 978-0-9740589-9-3
- Pendarves, G. G. Thirty Pieces of Silver. Black Dog Books, Normal, Il., 2009. ISBN 1-928619-85-1
