= Vagabond Luck =

1919 film by Scott R. Dunlap

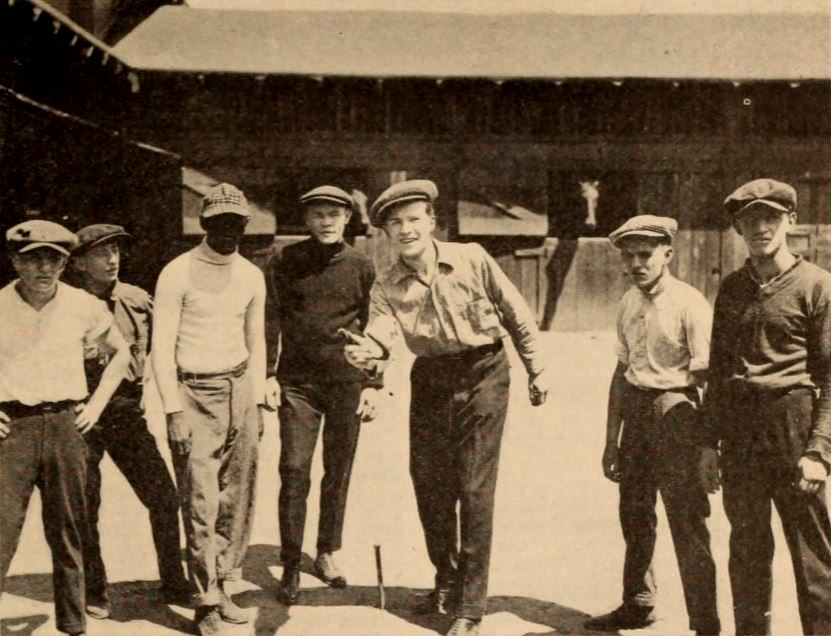
- Directed by: Scott R. Dunlap
- Written by: Scott R. Dunlap (scenario); Joseph Anthony Roach (scenario)
- Starring: Albert Ray; Elinor Fair; Jack Rollens; John Cossar; William Ryno
- Cinematography: George Schneiderman
- Production company: Fox Film Corporation
- Distributed by: Fox Film Corporation
- Release date: November 16, 1919
- Running time: 5 reels
- Country: United States
- Languages: Silent film (English intertitles)

Vagabond Luck is a lost 1919 American silent comedy drama film directed by Scott R. Dunlap and starring Albert Ray, Elinor Fair, Jack Rollens, John Cossar, and William Ryno. The film was released by Fox Film Corporation on November 16, 1919.

== Plot ==
According to a film magazine, "Joy Bell, at her father's death, is left with a small country home and a broken down race horse. In order to support herself and keep the home at all she has been compelled to teach music. Harry, her worthless brother, has become entangled in financial difficulties and is hard pressed for money. He conceives the idea of entering Vagabond in a selling race and mortgages the old home. Having been framed by a group of race track touts he believes that Vagabond will win and so places all the money he can command on this race. When Joy learns of it she talks it over with Jimmie Driscoll, an ex-jockey who is a pal of her own, and they take Vagabond for a try-out. During this experiment they find that the horse goes great on a wet track but on a dry track has no chance. Jimmie having heard that if you prayed hard enough for a thing you might get it, takes Joy to the church and asks the parson to pray with them for rain. Their prayer was answered and the rain came down in torrents. The race touts who had framed Harry knowing of Vagabond's work on a wet track, try to bribe the jockey but Jimmie overhears their talk and just before the race takes the jockey's place. As a result Vagabond wins the race, Harry wins the money and Jimmie wins Joy's love."

== Cast ==
- Albert Ray as Jimmie Driscoll
- Elinor Fair as Joy Bell
- Jack Rollens as Harry Bell
- John Cossar as Jim Richardson
- William Ryno as Tunk
- George Millum as Jumbo
- Al Fremont as Spike Bradley
- Lloyd Bacon as Buck
- Johnny Ries as Johnny

== Production ==
Vagabond Luck was produced under the working title A Little Prayer for Rain, and the racetrack scenes were shot on location at the California State Fair in Sacramento. Originally, the film was slated to be directed by Jack Dillon, but he "severed ties" with Fox Film before production began.

== Reception ==
Exhibitor's Herald gave the film a positive review, praising it for its atmosphere and well selected cast. Special praise was given to the cinematographer for the race track scene.

Motion Picture News reviewer Laurence Reid gave the film a very positive review, calling it "In our opinion it is quite the best offering that the Fox co-stars have had." The reviewer praised the film for its simple but sympathetic story, and said the picture "contains enough vitality to extend through five reels."

Wid's Filmdom gave the film a mostly positive review, praising the story for uplifting the actors performances and saying of the story itself; "There are many convenient situations to be sure but on the whole there is nothing objectionable about them." The reviewer noted that the jockey in blackface was unnecessary, and "could have been avoided" by hiring a black actor.

== Preservation ==
With no holdings located in archives, Vagabond Luck is considered a lost film.
