= The Lawless Woman =

1931 film

- Directed by: Richard Thorpe
- Written by: Arthur Hoerl; Barney Gerard; Richard Thorpe
- Produced by: George R. Batcheller
- Starring: Vera Reynolds; Carroll Nye; Thomas E. Jackson
- Cinematography: M.A. Anderson
- Edited by: Tom Persons
- Production company: Chesterfield Pictures
- Distributed by: Chesterfield Pictures
- Release date: June 15, 1931
- Running time: 63 minutes
- Country: United States
- Language: English

The Lawless Woman is a 1931 American crime film directed by Richard Thorpe and starring Vera Reynolds, Carroll Nye and Thomas E. Jackson.

== Cast ==
- Vera Reynolds as June Page
- Carroll Nye as Allan Perry
- Thomas E. Jackson as 'Paddy' Reardon
- Wheeler Oakman as 'Poker' Wilson
- Gwen Lee as Kitty Adams
- James P. Burtis as Bill
- Phillips Smalley as Dan Taylor

== Bibliography ==
- Michael R. Pitts. Poverty Row Studios, 1929–1940: An Illustrated History of 55 Independent Film Companies, with a Filmography for Each. McFarland & Company, 2005.
