= The Alster Case =

1915 film by J. Charles Haydon

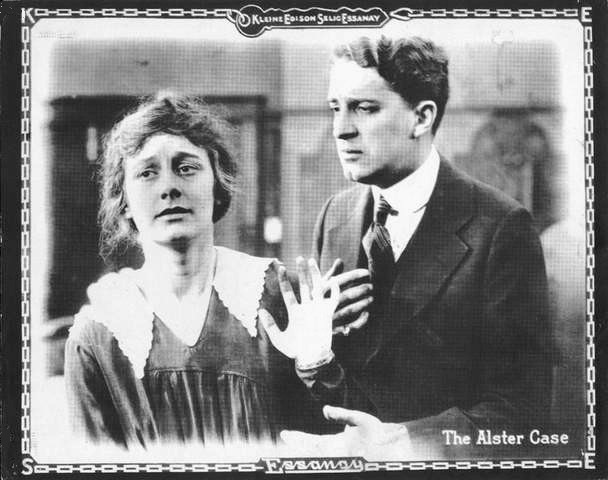
- Lobby card
- Directed by: J. Charles Haydon
- Written by: Rufus Gillmore (based on his novel, The Alter Case c.1914)
- Starring: Bryant Washburn; Ruth Stonehouse
- Cinematography: Arthur Reeves; Jackson Rose
- Production company: Essanay Studios
- Distributed by: V-L-S-E
- Release date: December 6, 1915
- Running time: 5 reels
- Country: United States
- Languages: Silent; English intertitles

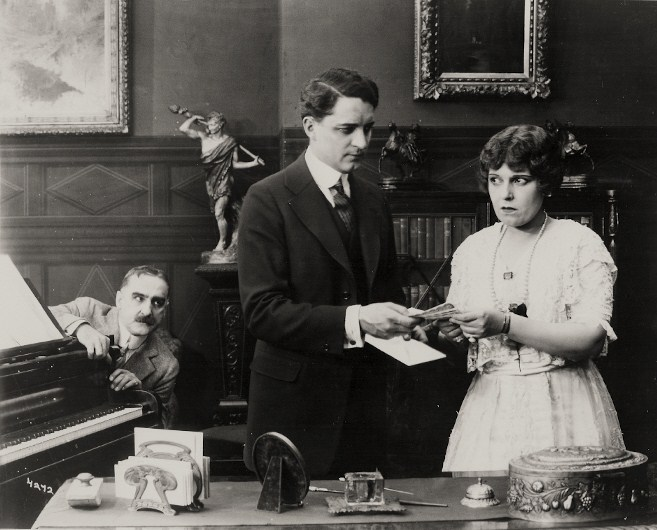
The Alster Case, left-to-right: John Cossar, Bryant Washburn, Anne Leigh

The Alster Case is a lost 1915 American silent drama film directed by J. Charles Haydon and starring Bryant Washburn and Ruth Stonehouse. It was based on a novel, The Alster Case, by Rufus Gillmore. It was produced by the Essanay Company.

== Plot ==
Miss Cornelia Alster, a wealthy spinster, secretly makes George Swan, a poor lawyer’s clerk, executor of her estate. That night, she returns home from the theater with him unexpectedly, discovering her two wards, Beatrice and Linda, in, what she thinks, is an affair with two men. As a matter of fact, Linda is fighting Keith, the butler, who is blackmailing her to force her to give him money, while Beatrice is entertaining her sweetheart, Allen Longstreet, a young inventor. Miss Alster waits in her room, determined to see who the men are. The next day she is found murdered. Trask, a noted detective, is put on the trail. He follows the five suspects, and all but George are exonerated, as he was the first who knew about the murder. George confesses to the crime, saying that he killed Cornelia to protect the reputations of Linda and Beatrice, as he was in love with both of them.

== Cast ==
- Bryant Washburn – George Swan
- John Cossar – Trask (*aka John H. Cossar)
- Ruth Stonehouse – Beatrice
- Anne Leigh – May Walsh
- Louise Crolius – Cornelia Alster
- Betty Scott – Linda
- Arthur W. Bates – Keith
- Rod La Rocque – Allen Longstreet
- Beatrice Styler – Agnes
