= The Sporting Age =

1928 film

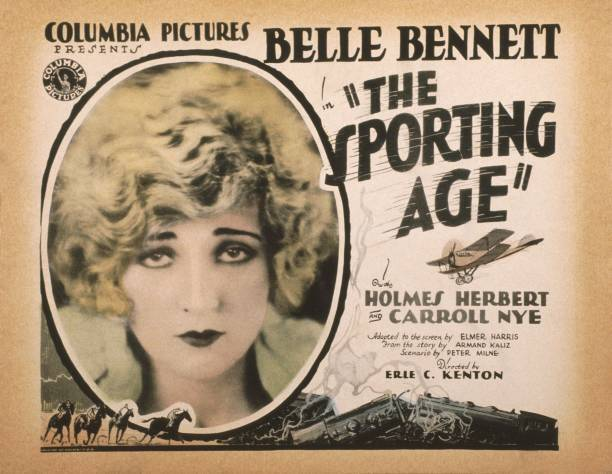
- Directed by: Erle C. Kenton
- Starring: Belle Bennett; Holmes Herbert; Carroll Nye
- Cinematography: Ray June
- Production company: Columbia Pictures
- Release date: March 2, 1928
- Running time: 6 reels
- Country: United States
- Language: Silent (English intertitles)

The Sporting Age is a lost 1928 American silent drama film, directed by Erle C. Kenton. The film depicts the life of a wife neglected by her husband.

== Plot ==
Miriam Driscoll doesn't think her husband, James Driscoll really loves her. After a train accident temporarily blinds James, Miriam has an affair with Phillip Kingston, her husband's male secretary. James regains his vision earlier than expected, and he realizes that his wife has cheated on him. He then asks his niece Nancy to steal Phillip from Miriam. The plan works, causing Miriam and James to get back together again.

== Cast ==
- Belle Bennett as Miriam Driscoll
- Holmes Herbert as James Driscoll
- Carroll Nye as Phillip Kingston
- Josephine Borio as Nancy Driscoll
- Edward Davis as The Doctor
