= Golden Shackles =

1928 film

- Directed by: Dallas M. Fitzgerald
- Written by: Ada McQuillan; G. Marion Burton; Gladys Gordon
- Produced by: Dallas M. Fitzgerald
- Starring: Grant Withers; Priscilla Bonner; LeRoy Mason
- Cinematography: Milton Moore
- Edited by: M.C. Dewar
- Production company: Dallas M. Fitzgerald Productions
- Distributed by: Peerless Pictures
- Release date: March 15, 1928
- Running time: 60 minutes
- Country: United States
- Languages: Silent; English intertitles

Golden Shackles is a 1928 American silent drama film directed by Dallas M. Fitzgerald and starring Grant Withers, Priscilla Bonner and LeRoy Mason.

== Cast ==
- Grant Withers as Frank Fordyce
- Priscilla Bonner as Lucy Weston
- LeRoy Mason as Herbert Fordyce
- Ruth Stewart as Vivi Norton

== Preservation ==
A nitrate print survives in the Library of Congress collection.
