= The Secret Witness =

1931 film

- Directed by: Thornton Freeland
- Written by: Sam Spewack
- Produced by: J. G. Bachmann
- Starring: Una Merkel; William Collier Jr. Zasu Pitts
- Cinematography: Robert H. Planck
- Edited by: Louis Sackin
- Production company: Famous Attractions
- Distributed by: Columbia Pictures
- Release date: December 12, 1931
- Running time: 66 minutes
- Country: United States
- Language: English

The Secret Witness is a 1931 American pre-Code drama film, directed by Thornton Freeland and starring Una Merkel, William Collier Jr. and Zasu Pitts. It is an adaptation of the novel Murder in the Gilded Cage by Sam Spewack.

== Plot ==
A man is found murdered in his luxury apartment. His neighbors believe that the wrong man has been arrested and set out to solve the crime.

== Cast ==
- Una Merkel as Lois Martin
- William Collier Jr. as Arthur Jones aka Casey
- Zasu Pitts as Bella
- Purnell Pratt as Capt. McGowan
- Ralf Harolde as Lewis Leroy
- Clyde Cook as Larson - Building Engineer
- June Clyde as Tess Jones
- Nat Pendleton as Gunner - Bodyguard
- Clarence Muse as Jeff - Building Janitor
- Hooper Atchley as Herbert 'Bert' Folsom
- Billy Bletcher as Radio Announcer's Voice
- Mike Donlin as Mike - Speakeasy Proprietor
- James Durkin as Detective
- Greta Granstedt as Moll
- Henry Hall as Police Commissioner Martin
- Paul Hurst as Officer Brannigan
- Rita La Roy as Sylvia Folsom
- Maston Williams as Contact Detective

== Bibliography ==
- Goble, Alan. The Complete Index to Literary Sources in Film. Walter de Gruyter, 1999.
