= Web of Fate =

1927 film

- Directed by: Dallas M. Fitzgerald
- Written by: Gardner Bradford; Willard King Bradley; Gladys Gordon; Ada McQuillan
- Produced by: Dallas M. Fitzgerald
- Starring: Lillian Rich; Henry Sedley; Eugene Strong
- Cinematography: Milton Moore
- Edited by: Desmond O'Brien
- Production company: Dallas M. Fitzgerald Productions
- Distributed by: Peerless Pictures
- Release date: November 7, 1927
- Country: United States
- Languages: Silent; English intertitles

Web of Fate is a 1927 American silent drama film directed by Dallas M. Fitzgerald and starring Lillian Rich, Henry Sedley and Eugene Strong.

== Cast ==
- Lillian Rich as Gloria Gunther / Beverly Townsend
- Henry Sedley as Linton
- Eugene Strong as Don Eddington
- John Cossar as Carlton Townsend
- Frances Raymond as Mrs. Townsend

== Bibliography ==
- Larry Langman & Daniel Finn. A guide to American silent crime films. Greenwood Press, 1994.
