= Border Law =

1931 film

- Theatrical poster
- Directed by: Louis King
- Written by: Stuart Anthony (story and dialogue)
- Starring: Buck Jones
- Cinematography: L. William O'Connell
- Edited by: Otto Meyer
- Production company: Columbia Pictures
- Distributed by: Columbia Pictures
- Release date: October 15, 1931
- Running time: 63 minutes 61 minutes (Sony Pictures Television print)
- Country: United States
- Languages: English; Spanish

Border Law is a 1931 American pre-Code Western film directed by Louis King and starring Buck Jones. The film was remade as Whistlin' Dan (1932) and again with Buck Jones as The Fighting Ranger (1934).

The film was based on a story by Stuart Anthony.

== Plot ==
Captain Wilks of the Texas Rangers orders Jim Houston and his crew, Thunder Rogers and Jim's brother Bob, to go to Eureka, Texas to break up the Shag Smith gang.

== Cast ==
- Buck Jones as Jim Houston
- Lupita Tovar as Tonita
- Jim Mason as Shag Smith (as James Mason)
- Frank Rice as Thunder Rogers
- Don Chapman as Bob Houston - Texas Ranger
- Lou Hicks as Dave (as Louis Hickus)
- F. R. Smith as Captain John Wilkes
- John Wallace as Pegleg

== Soundtrack ==
- Frank Rice - "If You Fall in Love"
- Lupita Tovar - "Adios Amigo"
