= Confessions of a Wife =

1928 film

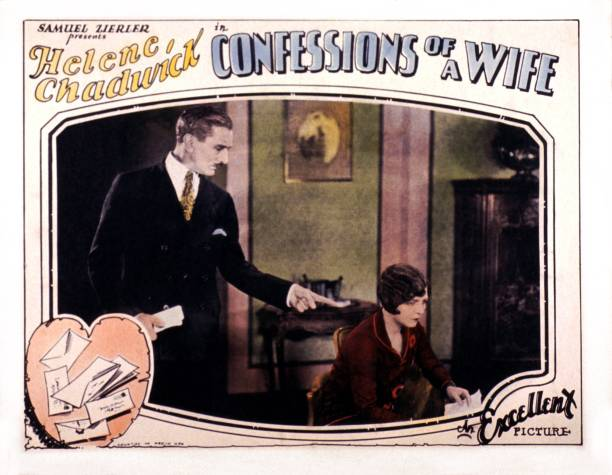
- Directed by: Albert H. Kelley
- Written by: Owen Davis
- Produced by: Samuel Zierler; Burton L. King
- Starring: Helene Chadwick; Walter McGrail; Ethel Grey Terry
- Cinematography: M.A. Andersen; Louis Dengel
- Production company: Excellent Pictures
- Distributed by: Excellent Pictures
- Release date: December 10, 1928
- Running time: 70 minutes
- Country: United States
- Languages: Silent; English intertitles

Confessions of a Wife is a 1928 American silent drama film directed by Albert H. Kelley and starring Helene Chadwick, Walter McGrail and Ethel Grey Terry.

A married woman loses huge amounts of money playing cards. She is blackmailed by her creditors into gaining them access to a ball where the wealthy will all be wearing their most expensive jewellery. She agrees to their terms, but also contacts the police who are able to thwart the plot.

== Cast ==
- Helene Chadwick as Marion Atwell
- Arthur Clayton as Paul Atwell
- Ethel Grey Terry as Mrs. Livingston
- Walter McGrail as Henri Duval
- Carl Gerard as Handsome Harry
- Clarissa Selwynne as Mrs. Jonathan
- Sam Lufkin as Bumby Lewis
- De Sacia Mooers as Dupree
- Suzanne Rhoades as Annette Pringle

== Bibliography ==
- Munden, Kenneth White. The American Film Institute Catalog of Motion Pictures Produced in the United States, Part 1. University of California Press, 1997.
