= Shameful Behavior? =

1926 film

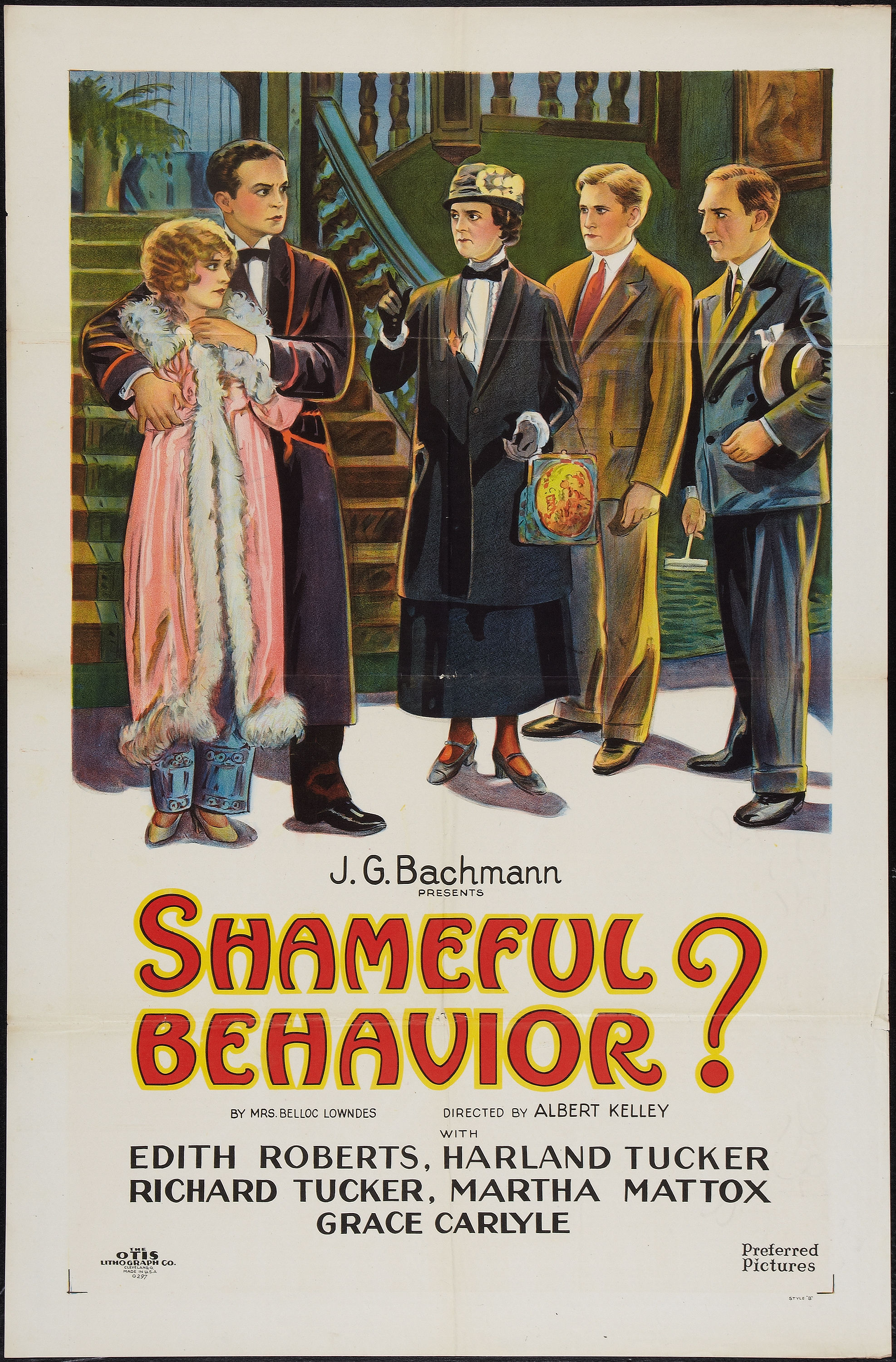
- Directed by: Albert H. Kelley
- Written by: Douglas Bronston; George Scarborough
- Based on: Shameful Behavior? by Marie Belloc Lowndes
- Produced by: J. G. Bachmann
- Starring: Edith Roberts; Richard Tucker; Martha Mattox
- Cinematography: Nicholas Musuraca
- Production company: B. P. Schulberg Productions
- Distributed by: Preferred Pictures
- Release date: October 1, 1926
- Running time: 60 minutes
- Country: United States
- Languages: Silent; English intertitles

Shameful Behavior? is a 1926 American silent romantic comedy film directed by Albert H. Kelley and starring Edith Roberts, Richard Tucker and Martha Mattox. It is based on a 1910 short story of the same name by Marie Belloc Lowndes.

== Synopsis ==
After going out to Paris a plain Jane and returning a fashionable flapper, Daphne Carrol sets out to woo the man she loves, her sister's brother-in-law. A series of mix-ups and a mistaken newspaper report leads him to believe that his "new" woman he has met is an escaped lunatic.

== Cast ==
- Edith Roberts as Daphne Carrol
- Richard Tucker as Jack Lee
- Martha Mattox as Mrs. Calhoun
- Harland Tucker as Custis Lee
- Grace Carlyle as Joan Lee
- Louise Carver as Sally Long
- Hayes E. Robertson as The Butler

== Bibliography ==
- Connelly, Robert B. The Silents: Silent Feature Films, 1910-36, Volume 40, Issue 2. December Press, 1998.
- Munden, Kenneth White. The American Film Institute Catalog of Motion Pictures Produced in the United States, Part 1. University of California Press, 1997.
