= The Smoke Eaters =

1926 film

- Directed by: Charles J. Hunt; Charles Hutchison
- Written by: Arthur Hoerl
- Produced by: Trem Carr
- Starring: Cullen Landis; Wanda Hawley; Edward Cecil
- Cinematography: William H. Tuers
- Production company: Trem Carr Pictures
- Distributed by: Rayart Pictures
- Release date: November 5, 1926
- Country: United States
- Languages: Silent; English intertitles

The Smoke Eaters is a 1926 American silent action film directed by Charles J. Hunt and Charles Hutchison and starring Cullen Landis, Wanda Hawley and Edward Cecil.

== Cast ==
- Cullen Landis as Ed
- Wanda Hawley as Jacqueline
- Edward Cecil as Edmund Kane
- Aryel Darma as His Wife
- Broderick O'Farrell as Roscoe Wingate
- Mae Prestell as Marie Wingate
- Harold Austin as Kenneth Wingate
- Baby Moncur as Junior Wingate

== Bibliography ==
- Munden, Kenneth White. The American Film Institute Catalog of Motion Pictures Produced in the United States, Part 1. University of California Press, 1997.
