= The Girl He Didn't Buy =

1928 film

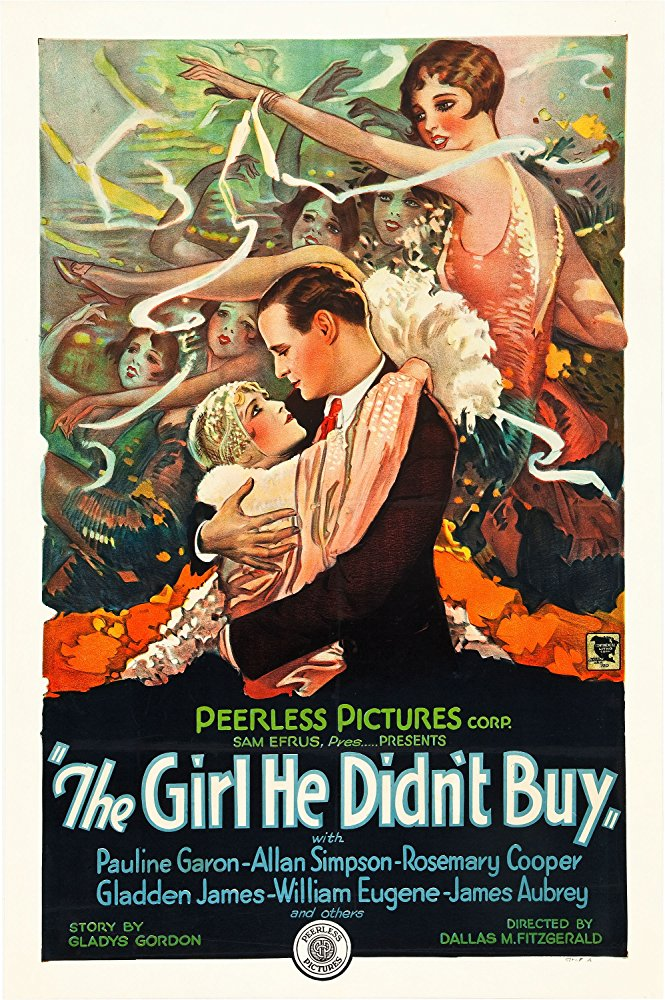
- Directed by: Dallas M. Fitzgerald
- Written by: Ada McQuillan; Gladys Gordon; Gardner Bradford
- Produced by: Dallas M. Fitzgerald
- Starring: Pauline Garon; Allan Simpson; Rosemary Cooper
- Cinematography: Milton Moore
- Edited by: Otto Ludwig
- Production company: Dallas M. Fitzgerald Productions
- Distributed by: Peerless Pictures
- Release date: April 15, 1928
- Running time: 57 minutes
- Country: United States
- Languages: Silent; English intertitles

The Girl He Didn't Buy is a 1928 American silent comedy drama film directed by Dallas M. Fitzgerald and starring Pauline Garon, Allan Simpson and Rosemary Cooper. It is also known by the alternative title of A Broadway Bride.

== Synopsis ==
An aspiring Broadway performer gets engaged to her show's financial backer, but is really in love with another man.

== Cast ==
- Pauline Garon as Ruth Montaigne
- Allan Simpson as Edwin Edinburg
- Rosemary Cooper as Maizie Dupont
- Gladden James as Hal De Forrest
- William Eugene as Philip D'Arcy
- Jimmy Aubrey as Hans
- Mae Prestell as Martha

== Bibliography ==
- Munden, Kenneth. The American Film Institute Catalog of Motion Pictures Produced in the United States, Part 1. University of California Press, 1997.
