= Woman's Law =

1927 film

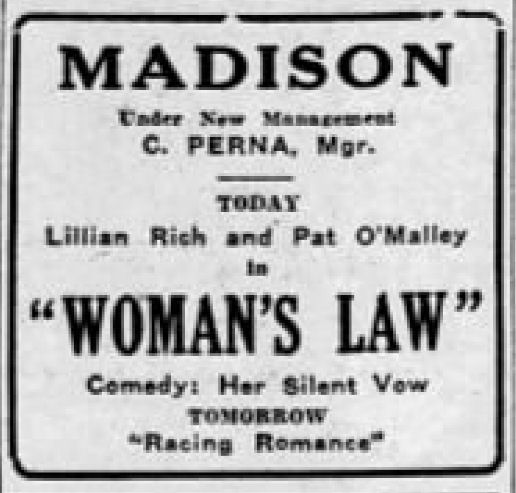
- Newspaper advertisement
- Directed by: Dallas M. Fitzgerald
- Written by: H. Tipton Steck
- Produced by: Dallas M. Fitzgerald
- Starring: Pat O'Malley; Lillian Rich; Audrey Ferris
- Cinematography: Milton Moore
- Edited by: Desmond O'Brien
- Production company: Dallas M. Fitzgerald Productions
- Distributed by: Peerless Pictures
- Release date: August 15, 1927
- Running time: 6 reels
- Country: United States
- Language: Silent (English intertitles)

Woman's Law is a 1927 American silent drama film directed by Dallas M. Fitzgerald and starring Pat O'Malley, Lillian Rich, and Audrey Ferris.

== Cast ==
- Pat O'Malley as Trooper Bucky O'Hare
- Lillian Rich as Helene
- Ernest Wood as Vaughan Neil
- John Cossar as John Collon
- Harold Miller as Philip Harley
- Edward Cecil as Inspector Steele
- Audrey Ferris as Rose La Pierre
- Sam Allen as Jules La Pierre

== Bibliography ==
- Munden, Kenneth White. The American Film Institute Catalog of Motion Pictures Produced in the United States, Part 1. University of California Press, 1997.
