= The House of Mystery (1934 film) =

1934 film by William Nigh

- Promotional image
- Directed by: William Nigh
- Screenplay by: Albert De Mond
- Based on: The Ape by Adam Hull Shirk
- Starring: Ed Lowry; Verna Hillie; John Sheehan; Brandon Hurst; Joyzelle Joyner
- Cinematography: Archie Stout
- Edited by: Carl Pierson
- Production company: Monogram Pictures Corp.
- Distributed by: Monogram Pictures Corp.
- Release date: May 30, 1934
- Running time: 61 minutes
- Country: United States
- Language: English

The House of Mystery is a 1934 American Pre-Code mystery film directed by William Nigh. The film was an adaptation of the play The Ape by Adam Hull Shirk.

== Plot ==
After plundering and desecrating a temple in India in 1913, drunken archeologist John Prendergast is cursed by the priest, who re-animates a gorilla Prendergast killed and orders it to wreak its revenge on the thief.

Twenty years later, a partially paralyzed Prendergast resurfaces in the United States as the rich philanthropist, John Pren. His backers assemble at his mansion to demand their share of his plunder. Pren warns them that the "spirit of Kali" (the undead gorilla) killed two people he tried to repay. A séance is held to try to contact and appease Kali, but one of the backers is found strangled afterward. Later that night, another backer is found dead, dressed in a gorilla suit. A police investigation goes nowhere, and backer Jack Armstrong is attacked by the gorilla but escapes. Another backer dies, and Pren is found unconscious—the ape's attack on him apparently interrupted. Pren proposes to his nurse, Ella, which enrages Pren's long-time companion, the Hindu girl Chanda. The police discover Pren has been faking paralysis and has been killing off his backers by allowing Kali to attack them. The ape kills Pren, but the police save Ella in the nick of time.

== Cast ==
- Ed Lowry as Dylan "Jack" Armstrong
- Verna Hillie as Ella Browning
- John Sheehan as Harry Smith
- Brandon Hurst as Hindu Priest
- Joyzelle Joyner as Chanda
- Fritzi Ridgeway as Stella Walker
- Clay Clement as John Prendergast aka John Pren
- George 'Gabby' Hayes as David Fells
- Dale Fuller as Mrs. Geraldine Carfax
- Harry C. Bradley as Prof. Horatio Potter
- Irving Bacon as Police Insp. Ned Pickens
- Mary Foy as Mrs. Hyacinth Potter

== Production ==
Prior to being released, The House of Mystery was prepared under the working titles The Ape and Curse of Kali by the studios Monogram Pictures. It was an adaptation of the play The Ape by Adam Hull Shirk. Among the cast was Verna Hillie who was borrowed from Paramount by Monogram for the production. Also among the cast was Laya Joy, an interpretive dancer who changed her name from Joyzelle just prior to the release of the film. The film was shot early in 1934 between January 25 and the 30 at General Service Studios.

== Release ==
The House of Mystery was released on 30 May 1934.

The play The Ape was later adapted again by Monogram and directed by Nigh as The Ape (1940) starring Boris Karloff. The two films only follow the plot point of a character disguising themselves as an ape. Siodmak spoke of the adaptation, declaring that "whether it was The Ape, The Climax (1944), or I Walked with a Zombie (1943), I never used the original material. I used my own stories."
