= Life's Darn Funny =

1921 film

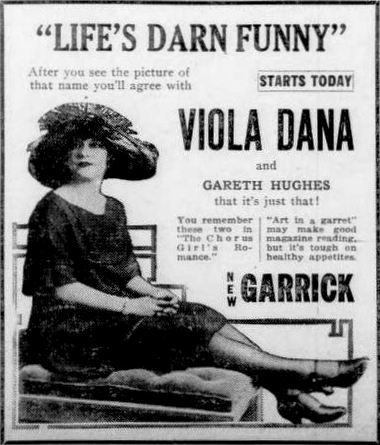
- Directed by: Dallas M. Fitzgerald
- Written by: Mary O'Hara; Arthur Ripley
- Story by: Christine Jope-Slade
- Starring: Viola Dana; Gareth Hughes; Eva Gordon
- Cinematography: John Arnold
- Production company: Metro Pictures
- Distributed by: Metro Pictures
- Release date: August 1, 1921
- Running time: 6 reels
- Country: United States
- Language: Silent (English intertitles)

Life's Darn Funny is a 1921 American silent comedy film directed by Dallas M. Fitzgerald and starring Viola Dana, Gareth Hughes, and Eva Gordon.

== Cast ==
- Viola Dana as Zoe Roberts
- Gareth Hughes as Clay Warwick
- Eva Gordon as Miss Dellaroc
- Kathleen O'Connor as Gwendolyn Miles
- Mark Fenton as Prince Karamazov

== Production ==
Exteriors for Life's Darn Funny were filmed at Santa Catalina Island.

== Preservation ==
With no prints of Life's Darn Funny located in any film archives, it is considered a lost film.

== Bibliography ==
- Munden, Kenneth White. The American Film Institute Catalog of Motion Pictures Produced in the United States, Part 1. University of California Press, 1997.
