= Joyzelle Joyner =

American actress (1905–1980)

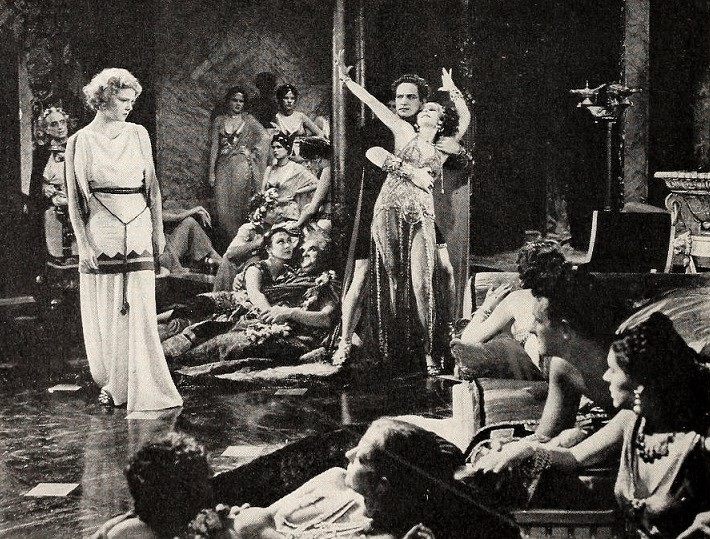
- Joyner held by Fredric March in The Sign of the Cross (1932)
- Born: August 27, 1905; Alabama, U.S.
- Died: November 30, 1980 (aged 75); Orange, California, U.S.
- Occupation: Film actress
- Years active: 1925–1935

Joyzelle Joyner (August 27, 1905 – November 30, 1980) was an American actress and dancer. She appeared in at least thirty films between 1925 and 1935, garnering some notoriety for her appearance in The Sign of the Cross.

== Career ==
Joyner began appearing in films around 1924 or 1925, often playing dancers. Her first major role in a major motion picture came in 1930, when she appeared as twin queens of Mars, Boo Boo and Loo Loo in Just Imagine. Her role as Ancaria in The Sign of the Cross, a major production directed by Cecil B. deMille, drew attention from censors; in the film, she performed the lesbian-overtoned "Dance of the Naked Moon".

The scene was eliminated from the re-released 1935 version of the film, but reinserted in 1993 for the MCA-Universal video version. That same year, she had prominent roles in two westerns, Whistlin' Dan for Tiffany Pictures, and The Vanishing Frontier (starring Johnny Mack Brown) for Paramount Pictures.

Most of Joyzelle's work after 1932 constituted uncredited parts, though she did appear under the name "Laya Joy" in House of Mystery, a horror film for Monogram Pictures. Her last-known screen appearance, in Dante's Inferno (1935), was uncredited, but did afford her the opportunity to show off her dancing skills.

== Personal life ==
Joyner was born in Alabama and had a younger brother, Clarence. According to U.S. census records, Clarence was living in California in 1930 with wife Lois.

Joyner's first marriage was to Dudley V. Brand. The two became estranged over Joyner's pursuit of an acting career. During an argument on August 11, 1927, Brand fired two shots through a closed bedroom door, one shot injuring Joyner in the arm. Clarence Joyner was on hand to protect his sister by restraining Brand. She filed for divorce from Brand on November 10, 1927. Joyner's second marriage was to film director Phil Rosen in 1929.

Joyner died in Orange, California on November 30, 1980, aged 75.

== Filmography ==
Year	Title	Role	Notes
1925	Ben-Hur	Slave Girl	Uncredited
1926	Dance Madness	Dancer	Lost film
1926	The Sea Beast	Dancer in prologue	
1927	Out of the Past	Saida	Lost film
1928	Turn Back the Hours	A Cantina Girl	
1928	Moran of the Marines		Lost film
1928	Shadows of the Night	Cabaret Dancer	
1928	The Shady Lady	Unbilled	Uncredited
1929	Close Harmony	Dancer	
1929	The Black Watch	Indian Dancer	Uncredited
1929	One Hysterical Night	Salome	
1930	Prince of Diamonds	Dancing Girl	
1930	Sombras habaneras		
1930	Song of the Caballero	Conchita	
1930	Lotus Lady	The Dancer	
1930	Just Imagine	Loo Loo / Boo Boo	
1932	Whistlin' Dan	Carmelita	
1932	The Vanishing Frontier	Dolores	
1932	The Sign of the Cross	Ancaria	
1933	Girl Without a Room	Dancer	Uncredited
1934	Search for Beauty	Beauty Contestant Entrant	Uncredited
1934	House of Mystery	Chanda	
1934	I Believed in You	Vavara	
1935	Go into Your Dance	Cantina Dancer	Uncredited
1935	Dante's Inferno	Dancer	Uncredited, (final film role)
