= Albert H. Kelley =

American film director (1894–1989)

- Born: October 7, 1894; Wallingford, Connecticut, United States
- Died: May 2, 1989 (aged 94); Los Angeles County, California, United States
- Other names: Albert Kelly
- Occupation: Film director
- Years active: 1918–1953

Albert H. Kelley (October 7, 1894 – May 2, 1989) was an American film director. He is often credited as Albert Kelly or Albert Kelley.

After previously working as an assistant director, Kelley directed a large number of short and feature films between 1921 and 1953 generally for low-budget companies. His most ambitious films was the American–Argentine silent historical film The Charge of the Gauchos (1928).

== Selected filmography ==
- Home Stuff (1921)
- His New York Wife (1926)
- Shameful Behavior? (1926)
- Dancing Days (1926)
- Stage Kisses (1927)
- Confessions of a Wife (1928)
- The Charge of the Gauchos (1928)
- Campus Knights (1929)
- The Woman Racket (1930)
- Jungle Bride (1933)
- Double Cross (1941)
- Submarine Base (1943)
- Street Corner (1948)

== See also ==
- List of film and television directors
- List of people from Connecticut
- List of people from California

== Bibliography ==
- Finkielman, Jorge (2003). The Film Industry in Argentina: An Illustrated Cultural History. Jefferson, North Carolina; London: McFarland & Company. ISBN 978-0786416288.
