= Jazzland (film) =

1928 silent film by Dallas M. Fitzgerald

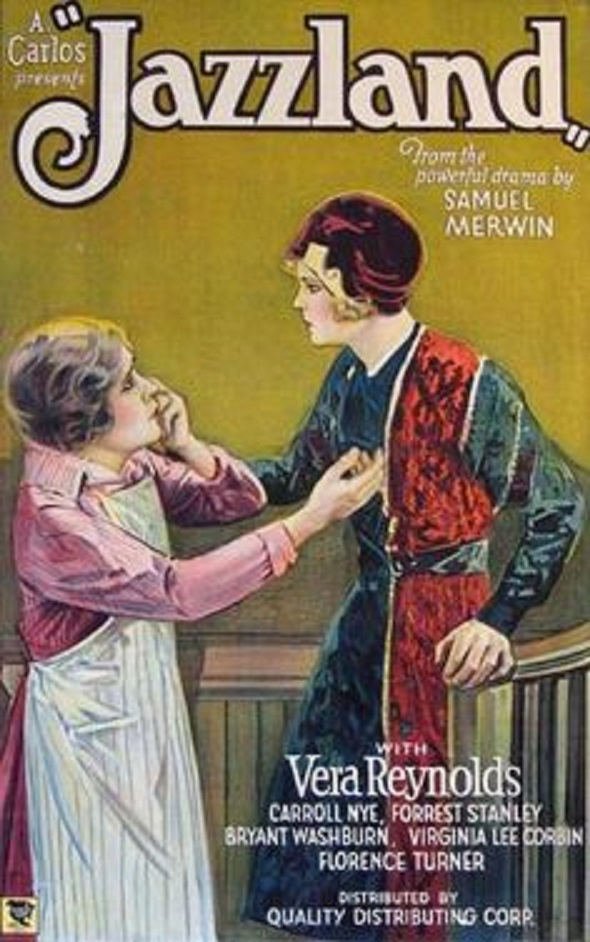
- Directed by: Dallas M. Fitzgerald
- Written by: Ada McQuillan; Samuel Merwin; Tom Miranda
- Starring: Bryant Washburn; Vera Reynolds; Carroll Nye
- Cinematography: Faxon M. Dean; Jack Draper
- Edited by: George McGuire
- Production company: Carlos Productions
- Distributed by: Quality Distributing Corporation
- Release date: December 1, 1928
- Running time: 60 minutes
- Country: United States
- Languages: Silent; English intertitles

Jazzland is a 1928 American silent drama film directed by Dallas M. Fitzgerald and starring Bryant Washburn, Vera Reynolds and Carroll Nye.

== Cast ==
- Bryant Washburn as Ernest Hallam
- Vera Reynolds as Stella Baggott
- Carroll Nye as Homer Pew
- Forrest Stanley as Hamilton Pew
- Virginia Lee Corbin as Martha Baggott
- Violet Bird as Kitty Pew
- Carl Stockdale as Joe Bitner
- Edward Cecil as Wilbraham
- George Ralph as Nedick
- Nicholas Caruso as Jackson
- Florence Turner as Mrs. Baggott
- Richard Belfield as Mr. Baggott

== Bibliography ==
- Munden, Kenneth White. The American Film Institute Catalog of Motion Pictures Produced in the United States, Part 1. University of California Press, 1997.
