= Ernest Wood (actor) =

American actor

Ernest D. Wood
- Died: July 13, 1942; Los Angeles, California, U.S.
- Occupation: Actor

Ernest Wood (died July 13, 1942) was an American stage and screen actor. He played in many movies, including Woman's Law, A Perfect Gentleman, Not Damaged, Call It Luck, and False Pretenses.
