= Dallas M. Fitzgerald =

American film director

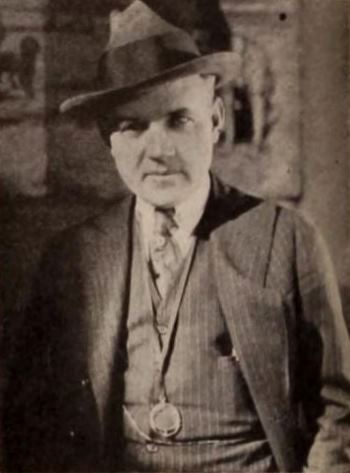
- From a 1920 magazine
- Born: August 13, 1876; La Grange, Kentucky, US
- Died: May 9, 1940 (age 63); Los Angeles, US
- Occupation(s): Director, producer, writer
- Known for: Work with Frank Buck
- Spouse: Henrietta Fitzgerald

Dallas M. Fitzgerald (August 13, 1876 – May 9, 1940) was an American motion picture director and producer, primarily in the silent era. He is also known as the writer of the Frank Buck film serial Jungle Menace.

== Early life ==
Fitzgerald born in La Grange, Kentucky to William Fitzgerald, a traveling salesman, and Jasie Fitzgerald.

== Career ==
Fitzgerald was a director of low-budget films. He began acting in films in 1916. He was hired by Greater Pictures Corp. in 1917. He directed mostly action melodramas believing, according to a 1921 interview, that the "public likes pictures made outdoors." In the late 1920s, Fitzgerald became a producer of the films Wilful Youth (1927) and Golden Shackles (1928) through low-budget Peerless Pictures, which had been founded by Jules Brulatour. In the sound era, Fitzgerald wrote screenplays for such serials as The Black Coin (1936), The Clutching Hand (1936), and The Great Adventures of Wild Bill Hickok (1938). He died in Los Angeles in 1940.

== Partial filmography ==
- The Open Door (1919)
- Chains of Evidence (1920) (*note:Library of Congress)
- The Price of Redemption (1920)
- Blackmail (1920)
- Cinderella's Twin (1920)
- The Off-Shore Pirate (1921)
- Puppets of Fate (1921) (*note:Cinemateca Brasileira-São Paulo)
- Life's Darn Funny (1921)
- Big Game (1921)
- The Match-Breaker (1921)
- The Infamous Miss Revell (1921)
- Playing with Fire (1921)
- The Guttersnipe (1922)
- Her Accidental Husband (1923) (*note:Cinematheque Quebecoise-Montreal)
- After the Ball (1924)
- Passionate Youth (1925) (*note:Cinemateca Brasileira, BFI Nat.l Film & TV)
- Tessie (1925)
- My Lady of Whims (1925)
- The Princess on Broadway (1927) (*note:BFI Nat'l. Film & TV, incomplete)
- Woman's Law (1927)
- The Rose of Kildare (1927)
- Out of the Past (1927) (*note:Bois d'Arcy)
- Web of Fate (1927) (*note:Library of Congress, BFI)
- Wilful Youth (1927)
- Golden Shackles (1928) (*note:Library of Congress)
- The Girl He Didn't Buy (1928) (*note:1 reel survives in foreign archive)
- The Lookout Girl (1928) (*note:LoC Catalog has no holdings,...but the film is out on DVD)
- Jazzland (1928)
- Maizie (1933)

== Work with Frank Buck ==
In 1937, Fitzgerald was a writer of the Frank Buck serial Jungle Menace.
