= College Days =

College days refers to one's time at college.

It may also refer to:

- College Days (1926 film)
- College Days (2010 film)
