= Louis Simon =

Louis Simon may refer to:

- Louis A. Simon (1867–1958), American architect
- Louis Simon (comedian), vaudeville comedian
