= The Seventh Commandment =

The Seventh Commandment may refer to:

- One of the Ten Commandments
- The Seventh Commandment (1932 film), an American film directed by James P. Hogan
- The Seventh Commandment (1957 film), a French film directed by Raymond Bernard
- The Seventh Commandment (1961 film), an American film directed by Crown International Pictures

== See also ==
- Seventh Commandment (disambiguation)
