= The Broncho Buster (1927 film) =

1927 film

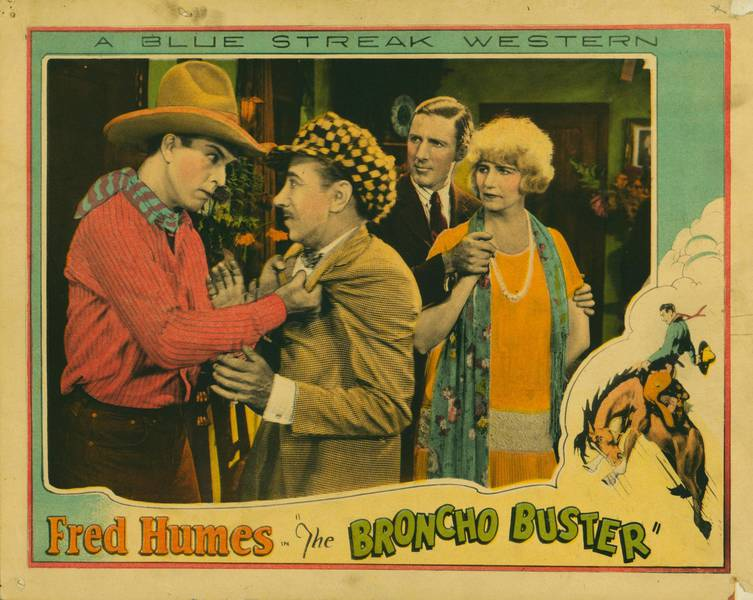
- Directed by: Ernst Laemmle
- Written by: Raymond Cannon (story); William Berke
- Produced by: Carl Laemmle
- Starring: Fred Humes; Gloria Grey; Buck Connors
- Cinematography: Alan Jones
- Production company: Universal Pictures
- Distributed by: Universal Pictures
- Release date: May 1, 1927
- Running time: 50 minutes
- Country: United States
- Languages: Silent; English intertitles

The Broncho Buster is a 1927 American silent Western film directed by Ernst Laemmle and starring Fred Humes, Gloria Grey and Buck Connors.

== Cast ==
- Fred Humes as Charlie Smith
- Gloria Grey as Barbara Furth
- Buck Connors as Sourdough Jones
- Charles Lee Quinn as Jim Gray
- David Dunbar as Curtis Harris
- William Malan as Maj. John Furth

== Preservation ==
With no holdings located in archives, The Broncho Buster is considered a lost film.

== Bibliography ==
- Connelly, Robert B. The Silents: Silent Feature Films, 1910-36, Volume 40, Issue 2. December Press, 1998.
- Munden, Kenneth White. The American Film Institute Catalog of Motion Pictures Produced in the United States, Part 1. University of California Press, 1997.
