= William MacLeod Raine =

American novelist (1871–1954)

William MacLeod Raine (June 22, 1871 – July 25, 1954) was a British-born American novelist who wrote fictional adventure stories about the American Old West.

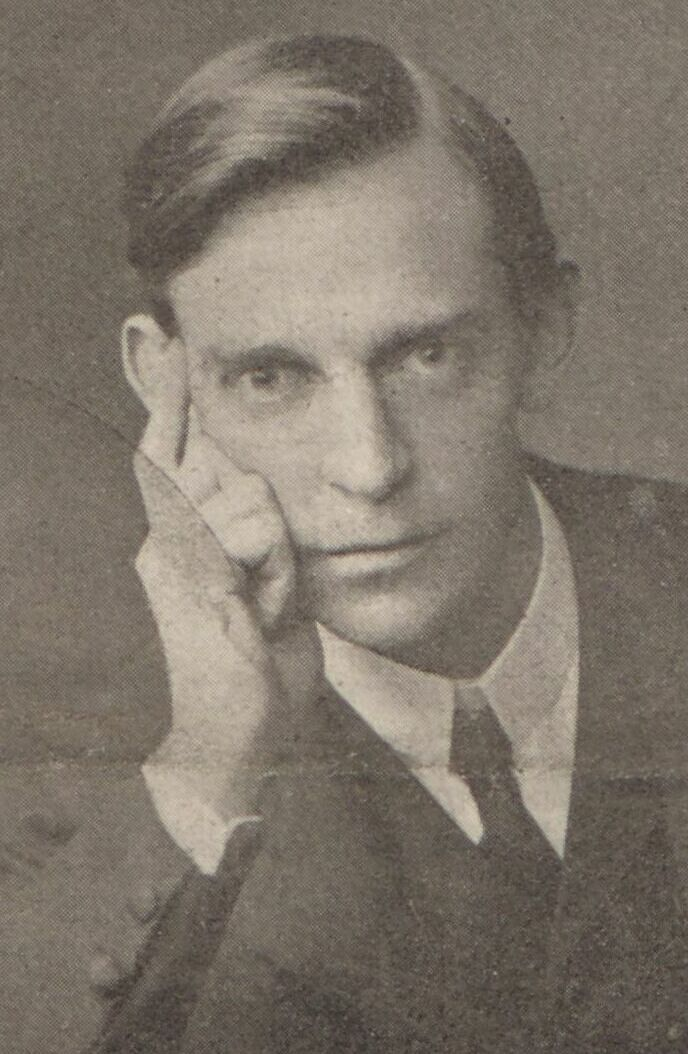
Raine circa 1902.

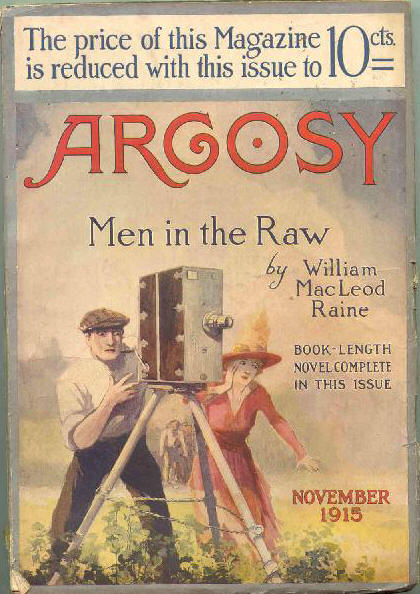
Raine's novel Men in the Raw appeared in The Argosy in 1915.

In 1959, he was inducted into the Hall of Great Westerners of the National Cowboy & Western Heritage Museum.

== Life ==
William MacLeod Raine was born in London, the son of William and Jessie Raine. After his mother died, his family migrated from England to Arkansas when Raine was ten years old, eventually settling on a cattle ranch near the Texas-Arkansas border. In 1894, after graduating from Oberlin College, Raine left Arkansas and headed for the western U.S. He became the principal of a school in Seattle while contributing columns to a local newspaper. Later he moved to Denver, where he worked as a reporter and editorial writer for local periodicals, including the Republican, the Post, and the Rocky Mountain News.

At this time he began to publish short stories, eventually becoming a full-time free-lance fiction writer, and finally finding his literary home in the novel. His earliest novels were romantic histories taking place in the English countryside. However, after spending some time with the Arizona Rangers, Raine shifted his literary focus and began to utilize the American West as a setting. The publication of Wyoming in 1908 marks the beginning of his prolific career, during which time he averaged nearly two western novels a year until his death in 1954. In 1920 he was awarded an M.L. degree from the University of Colorado, where he had established that school's first journalism course.

During the First World War 500,000 copies of one of his books were sent to British soldiers in the trenches. Twenty of his novels have been filmed. Though he was prolific, he was a slow, careful, conscientious worker, intent on accurate detail, and considered himself a craftsman rather than an artist.

In 1905 Raine married Jennie P. Langley, who died in 1922. In 1924 he married Florence A. Hollingsworth; they had a daughter. Though he traveled a good deal, Denver was considered his home.

In 1928, he ghost wrote with Billy Breakenridge, the book Helldorado: Bringing Law to the Mesquite. Breakenridge had been a deputy sheriff under Johnny Behan in Tombstone, Arizona Territory during the period of the Gunfight at the O.K. Corral. Breakenridge had pressed Wyatt for details about his time in Tombstone to add to the book. It was published the year before Wyatt died. and it depicted Wyatt as a thief, pimp, crooked gambler, and murderer. The book stated that the Earps and Doc Holliday aggressively mistreated the guiltless cowboys until they were forced into a fatal confrontation. His description of the 1881 O.K. Corral gun fight stated that the Clanton and McLaury brothers were merely cowboys who had been unarmed and surrendered but the Earp brothers had shot them in cold blood. Wyatt and Josie protested that the book's contents was biased and more fiction than fact. Earp complained about the book until his death in January, 1929, and his wife continued in the same vein afterward.

Raine died on July 25, 1954, and is buried at Fairmount Cemetery in Denver. He was posthumously inducted into the Hall of Great Westerners of the National Cowboy and Western Heritage Museum in 1959.

== Works ==
- A daughter of Raasay: a tale of the '45 (1904)
- Wyoming: A Story of the Outdoor West (1908) — filmed as The Man from Wyoming in 1924
- Ridgway of Montana: a story of today, in which the hero is also the villain (1909)
- A Texas Ranger (1910)
- Bucky O'Connor: A tale of the unfenced border (1910)
- Mavericks (1911)
- Brand Blotters (1911)
- Crooked Trails and Straight (1913)
- The Vision Splendid : A Story of Today (1913)
- The Pirate of Panama: A tale of the fight for buried treasure (1914)
- A Daughter of the Dons : A Story of New Mexico Today (1914)
- The Highgrader (1915)
- Steve Yeager (1915)
- Yukon Trail: A Tale of the North (1917) — filmed as The Grip of the Yukon in 1928
- The Sheriff's Son (1917)
- A Man Four-Square (1919)
- The Big-Town Round-Up (1920)
- Oh, You Tex! (1920)
- Gunsight Pass: How Oil Came to the Cattle Country and Brought a New West (1921)
- Tangled Trails: A Western Detective Story (1921)
- Man Size (1922)
- The Fighting Edge (1922)
- Iron Heart (1923)
- Desert Feud (1924)
- The Desert's Price (1924)
- Troubled Waters (1925)
- Roads of Doubt (1925)
- Bonanza: A Story of the Gold Trail (1926)
- Return of the Range Rider (1926)
- Judge Colt (1927)
- Texas Man (1928)
- Colorado (1928)
- Moran Beats Back: reprinted in 1974 as Gunsmoke Trail (1928)
- Cattle, cowboys and rangers (1930)
- The Valiant (1930)
- Beyond the Rio Grande (1931)
- Rutledge Trails the Ace of Spades (1931)
- Under Northern Stars (1932)
- The Black Tolts (1932)
- Pistol Pardners (1932)
- The Broad Arrow (1933)
- For Honor and Life (1933)
- The Trail of Danger (1934)
- Square Shooter (1934)
- Roaring River (1934)
- Border Breed (1935)
- Run of the Brush (1936)
- To Ride the River With (1936)
- King of the Bush (1937)
- Bucky Follows a Cold Trail (1937)
- On The Dodge (1938)
- Sons of the Saddle (1938)
- The River Bend Feud (1939)
- Guns of the Frontier; The story of how law came to the West (1940)
- Riders of Buck River (1940)
- Trail's End (1940)
- They Called Him Blue Blazes (1941)
- 45-caliber law; the way of life of the frontier peace officer (1941)
- Clattering Hoofs (1942)
- Justice Deferred (1942)
- Texas Breed, a Western Novel (1942)
- The Damyank (1942)
- Hell and High Water (1943)
- Gone to Texas (1943)
- Courage Stout (1944)
- The Fighting Tenderfoot (1944)
- Famous Sheriffs & Western Outlaws (1944)
- Who wants to live forever? (1945)
- Tough Tenderfoot (1945)
- Powdersmoke Feud: original title: This nettle danger (1945)
- Challenge to Danger (1947)
- Cry Murder (1947)
- Arizona Guns (1947)
- The Bandit Trail (1947)
- Ranger's Luck (Whipsaw) (1949)
- Jingling Spurs (1950)
- The River Bend Feud (1950)
- Glory Hole: A rousing tale of Leadville in the frontier days (1951)
- West of the Law (1951)
- Saddlebum (1951)
- Justice comes to Tomahawk (1952)
- Dry bones in the valley (1953)
- Rustler's Gap (1953)
- Guns of the Frontier (1954)
- Reluctant Gunman (1954)
- High Grass Valley (1955)
