= Ernst Laemmle =

German screenwriter and director (1900–1950)

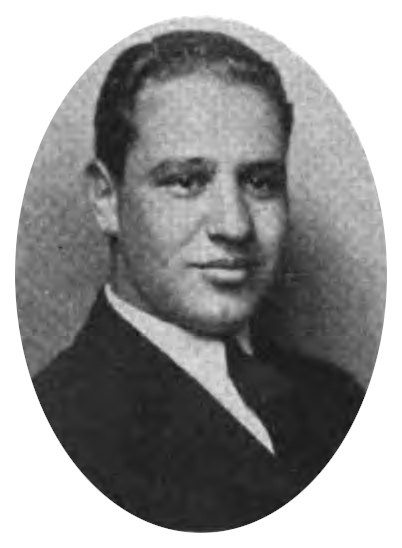
- Born: 25 September 1900; Munich, German Empire
- Died: 1 May 1950 (aged 49); Los Angeles, California, US
- Occupations: Writer, director

Ernst Laemmle (25 September 1900 – 1 May 1950) was a German-American screenwriter and film director. He was the nephew of Universal Pictures founder Carl Laemmle and like many of his relatives he was brought over to America to work for the studio. Ernst directed a number of short western films during the silent era. He also directed films for Universal's German subsidiary.

During the 1930s, he worked as Universal's foreign dialogue supervisor. He was a son of German antique dealer Siegfried Laemmle, and died in Hollywood.

== Selected filmography ==
=== Director ===
- The Sunset Trail (1924)
- The Storm King (1925)
- The Phantom of the Opera (1925) (Uncredited)
- Prowlers of the Night (1926)
- A One Man Game (1927)
- Red Clay (1927)
- Range Courage (1927)
- The Broncho Buster (1927)
- The Grip of the Yukon (1928)
- Phyllis of the Follies (1928)
- The Unusual Past of Thea Carter (1929)
- The Daredevil Reporter (1929)
- What Men Want (1930)

=== Screenwriter ===
- The Palm Beach Story (1942)
- The Great Moment (1944)

== Bibliography ==
- Jacobs, Diane. Christmas in July: The Life and Art of Preston Sturges. University of California Press, 1992.
