= The Last Trail (1927 film) =

1927 film

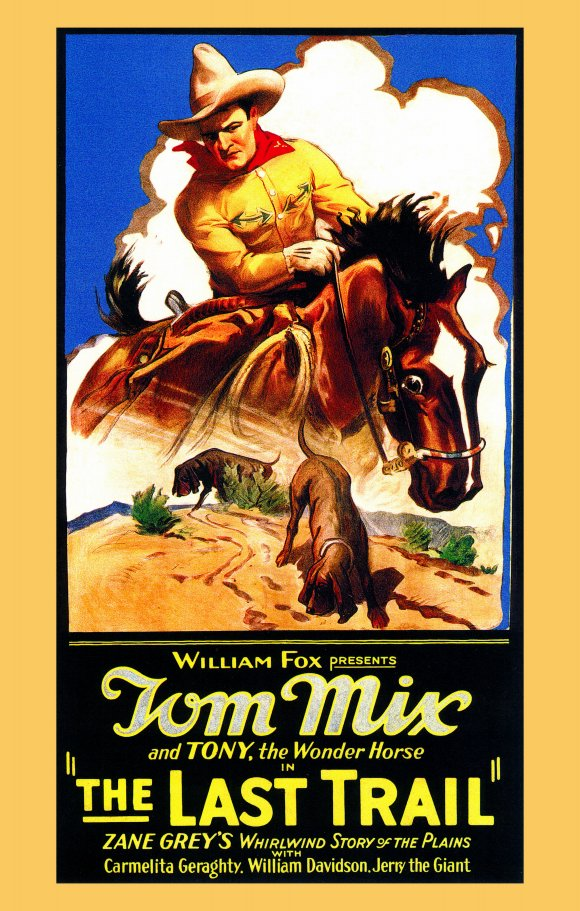
- Theatrical release poster
- Directed by: Lewis Seiler
- Screenplay by: John Stone
- Based on: The Last Trail by Zane Grey
- Starring: Tom Mix; Carmelita Geraghty; William B. Davidson; Jerry Madden; Frank Hagney; Lee Shumway
- Cinematography: Daniel B. Clark
- Edited by: Robert Bischoff
- Production company: Fox Film Corporation
- Distributed by: Fox Film Corporation
- Release date: January 23, 1927
- Running time: 56 minutes
- Country: United States
- Languages: Silent; English intertitles

The Last Trail is a 1927 American silent Western film directed by Lewis Seiler and written by John Stone. It is based on the 1909 novel The Last Trail by Zane Grey. The film stars Tom Mix, Carmelita Geraghty, William B. Davidson, Jerry Madden, Frank Hagney and Lee Shumway. The film was released on January 23, 1927, by Fox Film Corporation. A print of The Last Trail exists.

== Cast ==
- Tom Mix as Tom Dane
- Carmelita Geraghty as Nita Carrol
- William B. Davidson as Kurt Morley
- Jerry Madden as Tommy Pascal
- Frank Hagney as Henchman Cal Barker
- Lee Shumway as Sheriff Joe Pascal
- Robert Brower as Sam Beasley
- Oliver Eckhardt as Jasper Carrol
- Frank Beal as Bert Summers
- Tony the Horse as Tony
