= What Men Want (1930 film) =

1930 film

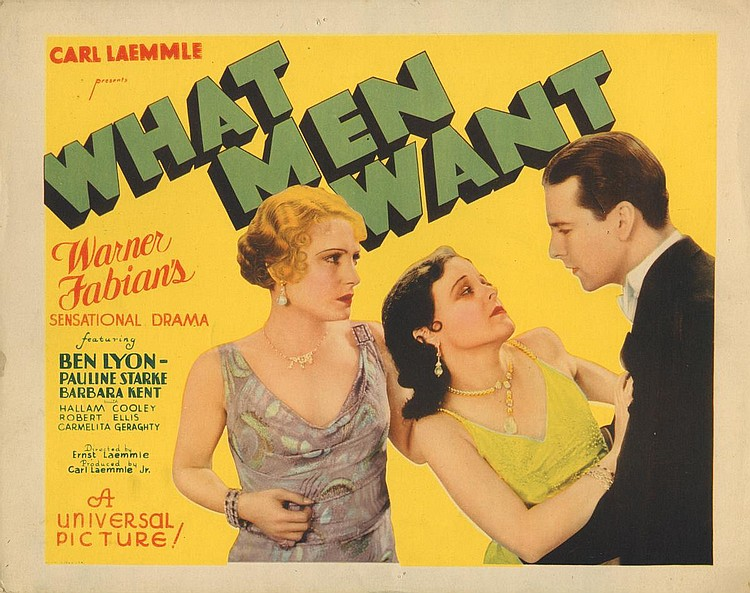
- Directed by: Ernst Laemmle
- Screenplay by: John B. Clymer; Dorothy Yost
- Story by: Samuel Hopkins Adams
- Produced by: Carl Laemmle Jr.
- Starring: Pauline Starke; Ben Lyon; Hallam Cooley; Barbara Kent; Robert Ellis; Carmelita Geraghty
- Cinematography: Roy Overbaugh
- Edited by: Philip Cahn
- Music by: Heinz Roemheld
- Production company: Universal Pictures
- Distributed by: Universal Pictures
- Release date: July 13, 1930
- Running time: 65 minutes
- Country: United States
- Language: English

What Men Want is a 1930 American pre-Code drama film directed by Ernst Laemmle and starring Pauline Starke, Ben Lyon, Hallam Cooley, Barbara Kent, Robert Ellis and Carmelita Geraghty. (All three credited actresses were WAMPAS Baby Stars.) Written by John B. Clymer and Dorothy Yost, the film was released on July 13, 1930, by Universal Pictures.

== Plot ==
Lee Joyce tells her lover, Howard LeMoyne, that she is actually in love with another man, Kendall James. As soon as her breakup happens, Lee's younger sister Betty turns up and Kendall becomes infatuated with her instead. In anger, Lee shatters her sister's romance by revealing her previous affair with Kendall, after which Lee tries to return to Howard.

== Cast ==
- Pauline Starke as Lee Joyce
- Ben Lyon as Kendall James
- Hallam Cooley as Bunch
- Barbara Kent as Betty 'Babs' Joyce
- Robert Ellis as Howard LeMoyne
- Carmelita Geraghty as Mabel
