= Cyclone Cavalier =

1925 film directed by Albert S. Rogell

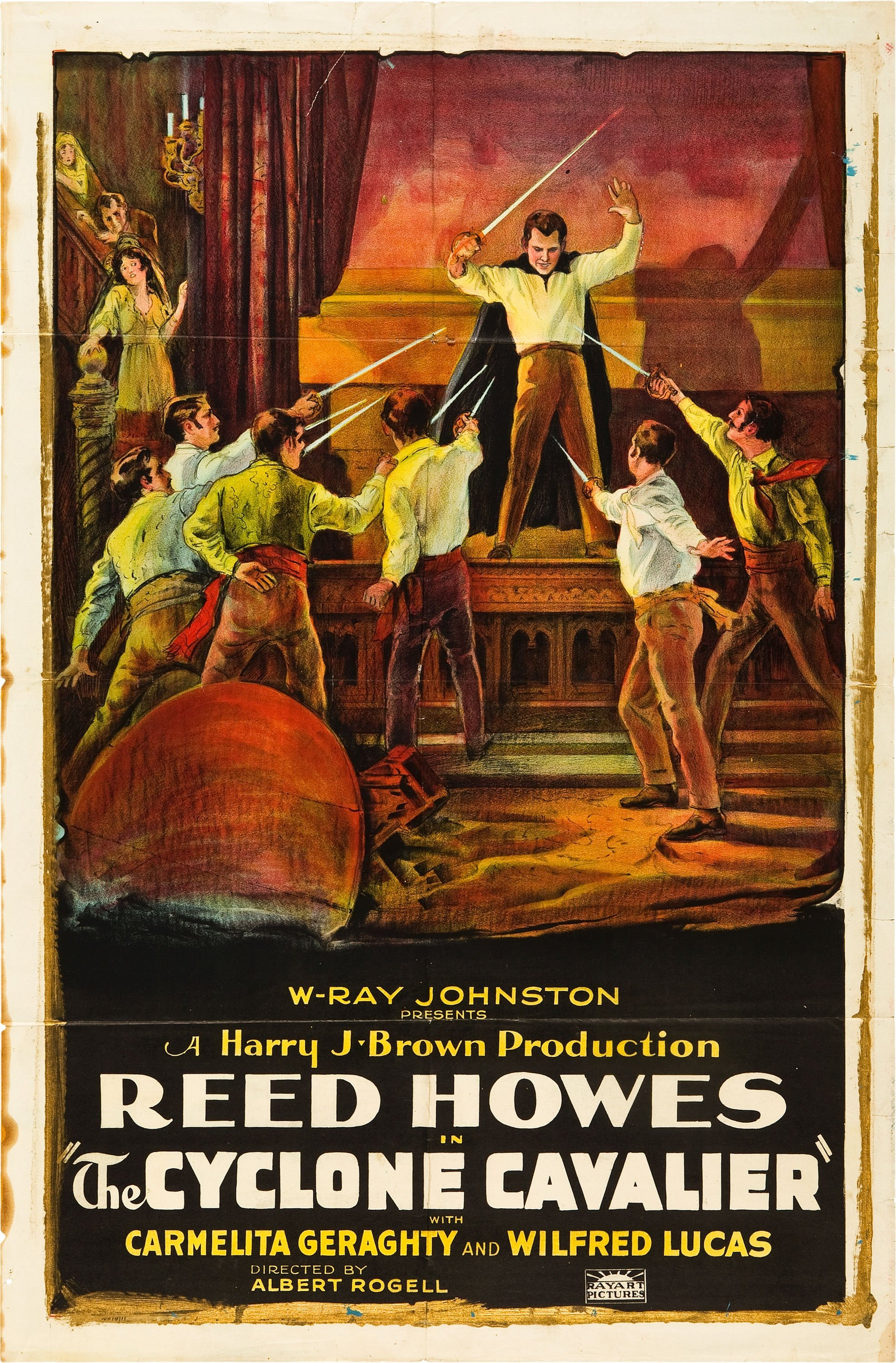
- Film poster
- Directed by: Albert S. Rogell
- Written by: Burke Jenkins; Krag Johnson
- Produced by: Harry Joe Brown
- Starring: Reed Howes; Carmelita Geraghty; Wilfred Lucas
- Cinematography: H. Lyman Broening
- Production company: Harry J. Brown Productions
- Distributed by: Rayart Pictures
- Release date: September 1925
- Running time: 5 reels
- Country: United States
- Language: Silent (English intertitles)

Cyclone Cavalier is a 1925 American silent Western film directed by Albert S. Rogell and starring Reed Howes, Carmelita Geraghty, and Wilfred Lucas.

== Plot ==
As described in a film magazine review, a young man whose adventurousness keeps him in trouble is sent to a small South American republic by his wealthy father. En route he meets and falls in love with the daughter of the president of the state to which she is going. He aids her father in stifling a revolution and wins the young woman's hand in marriage.

== Cast ==
- Reed Howes as Ted Clayton
- Carmelita Geraghty as Rosita Gonzales
- Wilfred Lucas as Hugh Clayton
- Eric Mayne as President Gonzales
- Jack Mower as El Diablo
- John West Sinclair as Mickey
- Ervin Renard as Van Blatten
- Sid Rogell as Secretary

== Bibliography ==
- Pitts, Michael R. (2012). Western Movies: A Guide to 5,105 Feature Films. McFarland. ISBN 978-0-7864-6372-5
