= Husband Hunters =

1927 film by John G. Adolfi

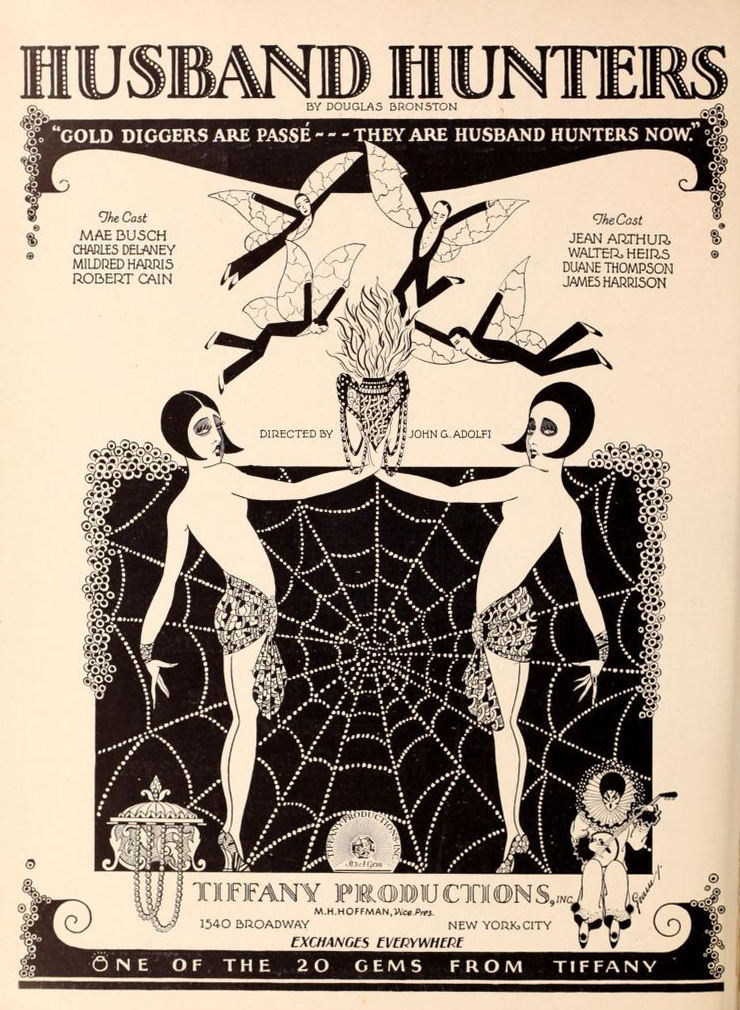
- Directed by: John G. Adolfi
- Written by: Douglas Bronston (story), Esther Shulkin
- Produced by: M.H. Hoffman
- Starring: Mae Busch; Charles Delaney; Jean Arthur; Duane Thompson; Mildred Harris
- Cinematography: Joseph Dubray
- Edited by: Harold Young
- Production company: Tiffany Pictures
- Distributed by: Tiffany Pictures
- Release date: January 15, 1927
- Running time: 60 minutes
- Country: United States
- Languages: Silent; English intertitles

Full film

Husband Hunters is a 1927 American comedy-drama silent film released by Tiffany Productions, directed by John G. Adolfi, and starring Mae Busch, Charles Delaney and Jean Arthur.

== Plot ==
The film looks at the exploits of chorus girls Marie and Helen who have dedicated themselves to finding and marrying millionaire husbands. The two ladies enlist the help of the innocent young Letty Crane in their scheme. Letty is a girl from a small town who dreams of one day making it big on Broadway.

After being enlisted by the two, Letty is left heartbroken by a young man and regrets her involvement. However, by the film's end, she is the only one of the trio who finally finds true love. Another chorus girl, Cynthia Kane follows the antics of the trio with both amusement and disapproval.

== Cast ==
- Mae Busch as Marie Devere
- Charles Delaney as Bob Garrett
- Jean Arthur as Letty Crane
- Walter Hiers as Sylvester Jones
- Duane Thompson as Helen Gray
- Mildred Harris as Cynthia Kane
- Robert Cain as Bartley Mortimer
- James Harrison as Jimmy Wallace
- Nigel Barrie as Rex Holden

== Preservation status ==
Previously thought to be lost film. The film is preserved at the BFI Film and Television, London.
