= Duane Thompson =

American actress

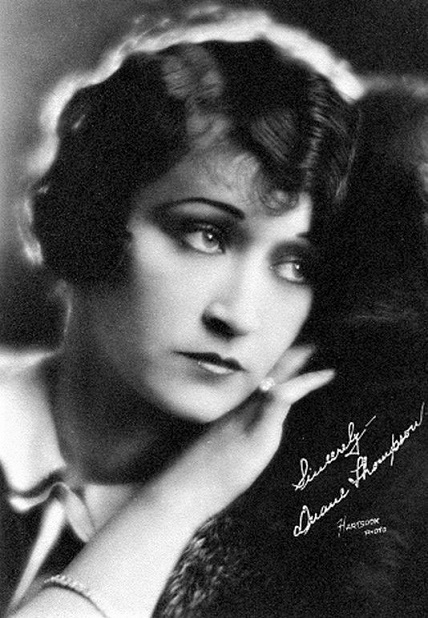
- Born: Duane Malony; July 28, 1903; Red Oak, Iowa, U.S.
- Died: August 15, 1970 (aged 67); Los Angeles, California, U.S.
- Other name: Violet Joy
- Occupation: Actress
- Years active: 1921–1940
- Spouse(s): Buddy Wattles (m.1928, divorced); William T. Johnson (m.1937)
- Children: 1

Duane Thompson (born Lura Duane Malony; July 28, 1903 – August 15, 1970) was an American film actress during Hollywood's silent film era. When talkies pushed silent films into the background, she worked in stock theater for a time before moving to radio drama. She was married twice, to comedian Buddy Wattles and to radio producer William T. Johnson.

== Dancer and bit player ==
Thompson and her mother moved to San Francisco and Hollywood in the early 1920s, where Thompson, after a stint as a cafe dancer, pursued a career in acting. She received her first film role in 1921, starring opposite Vernon Dent as Violet Joy in Up and At 'em.

== Silent film star ==
Dropping Violet Joy for Duane Thompson, she was Neal Burn's leading lady in Hot Water. That film launched her into regular roles, and she starred in four films that year. From 1923 to 1929, Thompson starred in 37 films, with uncredited roles in another three films. In 1925, she was one of 13 women selected by the Western Association of Motion Picture Advertisers (WAMPAS) as a WAMPAS Baby Star It was said at the time she was selected by WAMPAS that "Duane Thompson, with dancing as a foundation for a theatrical career, embarked on what is leading her to fame and fortune... She has appeared in numerous Christie Comedies, and is now leading lady for Walter Hiers."

== Stage and radio ==
Although Thompson appeared in Voice of the City, a talkie, the advent of talking films effectively ended her film career, and she went on to stock theater. In 1928, she was signed for a stage role in Dixie McCoy's production of Tarnish at the Hollywood Music Box., and in 1931, she played Susan Porter in Philip Barry's Holiday with the Woodward Players in St. Louis. Shortly thereafter, she turned to radio, where she opened each broadcast of the Hollywood Hotel radio program and played a lead in such comedy series as The Newlyweds.

Her radio role opening broadcasts of Hollywood Hotel led to an offer in 1937 to play herself in the Hollywood Hotel movie. Following that film she returned to her work in radio with her second husband, producer William T. Johnson. She was often cast as a switchboard operator.

== Personal life ==
Born July 28, 1903 in Red Oak, Iowa, Lura Duane Malony was the daughter of Dr. John Henry Malony and Georgia Ethel Manker. She and her mother relocated to Omaha when Duane was 2 years old, before moving on to California. Duane took the surname of her mother's second husband, Tommy Thompson. For a brief time she used the stage name Violet Joy. On December 11, 1928, she married stage comedian Emmett K. (Buddy) Wattles, and, in 1937, radio producer William T. Johnson. After retiring, she lived in Los Angeles with her husband and daughter, Judith, until her death on August 15, 1970, at the age of 67.

== Partial filmography ==
- Some Pun'kins (1925)
- The Mysterious Stranger (1925)
- April Fool (1926)
- The Lodge in the Wilderness (1926)
- College Days (1926)
- Husband Hunters (1927)
- Long Pants (1927)
- The Silent Avenger (1927)
- The Desert Pirate (1927)
- One Hour of Love (1927)
- Her Summer Hero (1928)
- The Fightin' Redhead (1928)
- The Flyin' Buckaroo (1928)
- Wizard of the Saddle (1928)
- Phyllis of the Follies (1928)
- The Price of Fear (1928)
- Phantom of the Range (1928)
- Beauty and Bullets (1928)
- Born to the Saddle (1929)
- Slim Fingers (1929)
- The Tip Off (1929)
- Voice of the City (1929)
- Hollywood Hotel (1937)
