= The Thrill Seekers =

1927 film

- Directed by: Harry Revier
- Written by: Mabel Z. Carroll
- Produced by: Harry Vallet
- Starring: Ruth Clifford; Gloria Grey; Robert McKim
- Cinematography: Jerry Fairbanks
- Production company: H.V. Productions
- Distributed by: Hi-Mark Film Company
- Release date: September 1927
- Running time: 50 minutes
- Country: United States
- Languages: Silent; English intertitles

The Thrill Seekers is a 1927 American silent drama film directed by Harry Revier and starring Ruth Clifford, Gloria Grey and Robert McKim.

== Cast ==
- Jimmy Fulton as Gerald Kenworth
- Ruth Clifford as Adrean Wainwright
- Gloria Grey as Mystery Girl
- Sally Long as Marie St. Claire
- Lee Moran as Lester, the Valet
- Robert McKim as Hal Walker
- Raymond Wells as Jack Newman
- Harold Austin as Jimmy, the Chauffeur
- Max Wagner as A Hood

== Bibliography ==
- Connelly, Robert B. The Silents: Silent Feature Films, 1910-36, Volume 40, Issue 2. December Press, 1998.
- Munden, Kenneth White. The American Film Institute Catalog of Motion Pictures Produced in the United States, Part 1. University of California Press, 1997.
