= George LeMaire =

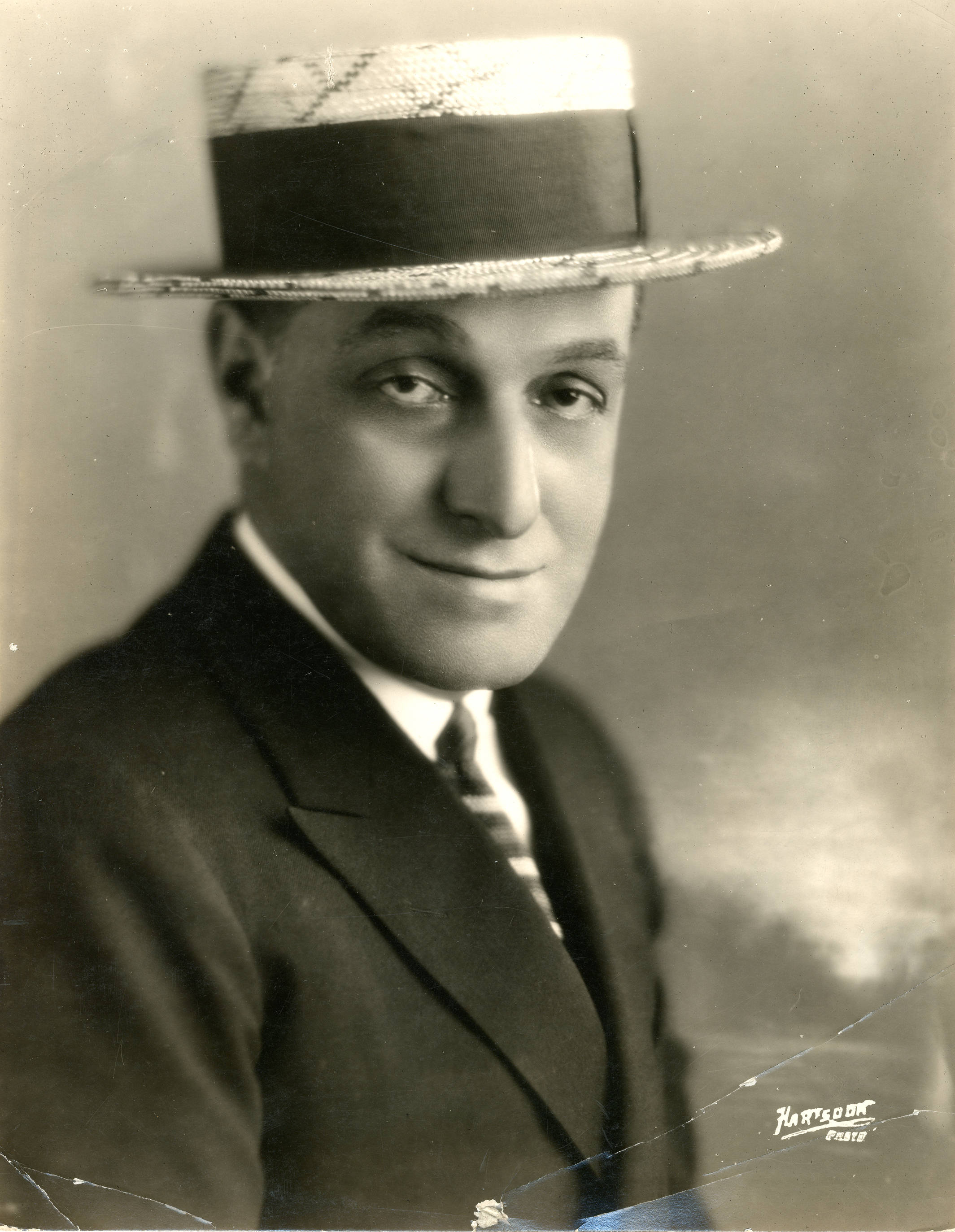
- George LeMaire c. 1926

Background information
- Born: Meyer Goldstick; December 22, 1884
- Died: January 20, 1930 (aged 43) New York City, New York
- Genres: Vaudeville
- Occupation: Comedian

George LeMaire (born Meyer Goldstick; December 22, 1884 – January 20, 1930) was an American vaudeville comedian who appears in several films and worked as a director and producer for Pathé. He was a "veteran straight man" who worked in comedy duos. His comedy partners included Eddie Cantor, Joe Phillips, and Louis Simon.

On January 20, 1930, he died from a heart attack in his New York studio.

Rufus LeMaire was his brother.

== Theater ==
- The Dream Girl (operetta), as William Addison
- Ziegfeld Follies of 1919
- George LeMaire's Broadway Brevities (1920)
- George White's Scandals of 1922

== Filmography ==
- Blockade (1928 film), writer
- Taxi 13 (1928), dialogue writer
- At the Dentist's (1929)
- Dancing Around (1929)
- The Plumbers Are Coming (1929)
- What A Day! (1929)
- Barber's College (1930)
- A Tight Squeeze (1930)
- The New Waiter (1930), a George LeMaire Comedy
- The Seventh Commandment (1932)
