= Carmelita Geraghty =

American actress and painter (1901–1966)

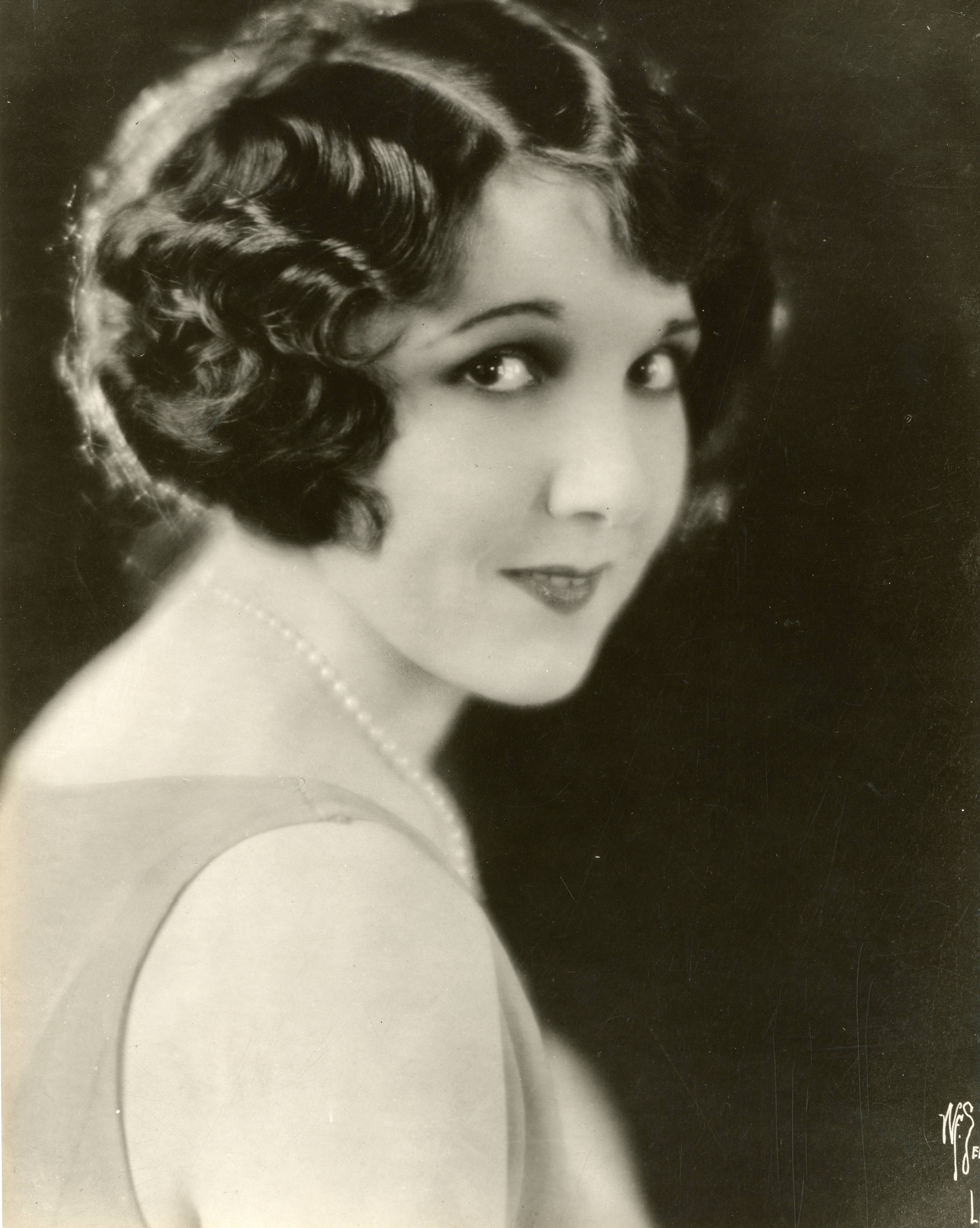
- Geraghty in 1924
- Born: March 21, 1901; Rushville, Indiana, U.S.
- Died: July 7, 1966 (aged 65); New York City, U.S.
- Resting place: Hollywood Forever Cemetery
- Occupations: Actress, painter
- Spouse: Carey Wilson (m. 1934; died 1962)
- Father: Thomas J. Geraghty
- Relatives: Maurice Geraghty (brother); Gerald Geraghty (brother)

Carmelita Geraghty (March 21, 1901 – July 7, 1966) was an American silent-film actress and painter.

== Early life ==
The daughter of screenwriter Tom Geraghty, she was the sister of writers Maurice and Gerald Geraghty. Her father wrote scenarios for Douglas Fairbanks Sr. and others.

Geraghty was born on March 21, 1901, in Rushville, Indiana, attended schools in New York, and graduated from Hollywood High School. Although her parents wished her to stay at home, she went off to become a movie star. Her father was slow to approve of his daughter's new employment. Geraghty achieved a measure of success as a Mack Sennett featured player.

== Career ==
Geraghty worked as a continuity clerk before she appeared on film. She started work out as an extra in the early 1920s, using a fictitious name until getting her big break. She was selected as one of the WAMPAS Baby Stars of 1924. She soon became a leading actress, including a co-starring role with Virginia Valli in The Pleasure Garden (1925), the first film directed by Alfred Hitchcock. She played golfer Jordan Baker in the first film version of The Great Gatsby (1926).

A New York Times review of one of her films commented that Geraghty "gives the only performance worth mentioning. She has very pretty eyes and obviously would be able to make her acting count for something in a more dramatic vehicle."

When the age of sound dawned, her career began to crumble. Her roles began to be much smaller. Her last film role was in Phantom of Santa Fe (1936). She then retired from film altogether. Wilson worked on the Andy Hardy and Dr. Kildare films.

She became a very accomplished artist about ten years after leaving motion pictures. Her painting style was reminiscent of French Impressionism. In the last years of her life, her artwork was put on display at the Weil Gardens in Paris.

== Personal life ==
She married Metro-Goldwyn-Mayer writer and producer Carey Wilson on May 6, 1934, in Beverly Hills, and they remained married until his death in 1962.

== Death ==
On July 7, 1966, Geraghty died of a heart attack at the Lombardy Hotel in Manhattan, aged 65. She is interred in the Hollywood Forever Cemetery in Hollywood, California.

== Partial filmography ==
- Bag and Baggage (1923)
- Jealous Husbands (1923)
- Black Oxen (1923)
- Discontented Husbands (1924)
- Through the Dark (1924)
- Trouble Brewing (1924)
- Geared to Go (1924)
- High Speed (1924)
- The Pleasure Garden (1925)
- Cyclone Cavalier (1925)
- Brand of Cowardice (1925)
- The Mysterious Stranger (1925)
- Under the Rouge (1925)
- Passionate Youth (1925)
- My Lady of Whims (1925)
- The Great Gatsby (1926)
- The Canyon of Light (1926)
- The Flying Mail (1926)
- Josselyn' Wife (1926)
- The Small Bachelor (1927)
- Venus of Venice (1927)
- The Girl from Everywhere (1927)
- The Slaver (1927)
- The Last Trail (1927)
- My Best Girl (1927)
- What Every Girl Should Know (1927)
- South of Panama (1928)
- Object: Alimony (1928)
- The Mississippi Gambler (1929)
- Paris Bound (1929)
- After the Fog (1929)
- This Thing Called Love (1929)
- What Men Want (1930)
- Men Without Law (1930)
- Rogue of the Rio Grande (1930)
- Fighting Thru (1930)
- Brothers (1930) (uncredited)
- Millie (1931)
- Forgotten Women (1931)
- The Devil Plays (1931)
- Fifty Million Frenchman (1931)
- Daybreak (1931)
- The Texas Ranger (1931)
- Graft (1931)
- Jungle Mystery (1932)
- Night Life in Reno (1932)
- Malay Nights (1932)
- Prestige (1932)
- Escapade (1932)
- The Flaming Signal (1933)
- Manhattan Butterfly (1935)
- The Phantom of Santa Fe (1936)
