= Phyllis of the Follies =

1928 film

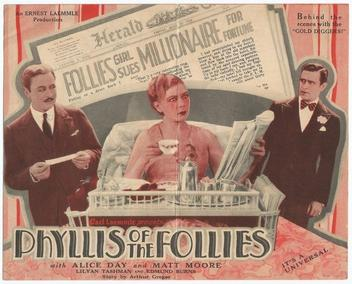
- Directed by: Ernst Laemmle
- Written by: John B. Clymer; Albert DeMond; Arthur Gregor
- Starring: Alice Day; Matt Moore; Edmund Burns
- Cinematography: George Robinson
- Production company: Universal Pictures
- Distributed by: Universal Pictures
- Release date: June 1928
- Country: United States
- Languages: Silent; English intertitles

Phyllis of the Follies is a 1928 American silent comedy film directed by Ernst Laemmle and starring Alice Day, Matt Moore and Edmund Burns.

== Cast ==
- Alice Day as Phyllis Sherwood
- Matt Moore as Howard Decker
- Edmund Burns as Clyde Thompson
- Lilyan Tashman as Mrs. Decker
- Duane Thompson as Mabel Lancing

== Bibliography ==
- Roots, James. The 100 Greatest Silent Film Comedians. Rowman & Littlefield, 2014.
