= The Tale of the Ticker =

1913 film

- Directed by: Allan Dwan
- Starring: J. Warren Kerrigan; Vivian Rich; George Periolat; Charlotte Burton
- Distributed by: Mutual Film
- Release date: November 20, 1913
- Country: United States
- Languages: Silent film English intertitles

The Tale of the Ticker is a 1913 American silent short drama film directed by Allan Dwan. The film stars J. Warren Kerrigan, Vivian Rich, George Periolat, and Charlotte Burton. Other cast members include James Harrison, Jack Richardson, and Charles Morrison.
