= The Grip of the Yukon =

1928 film

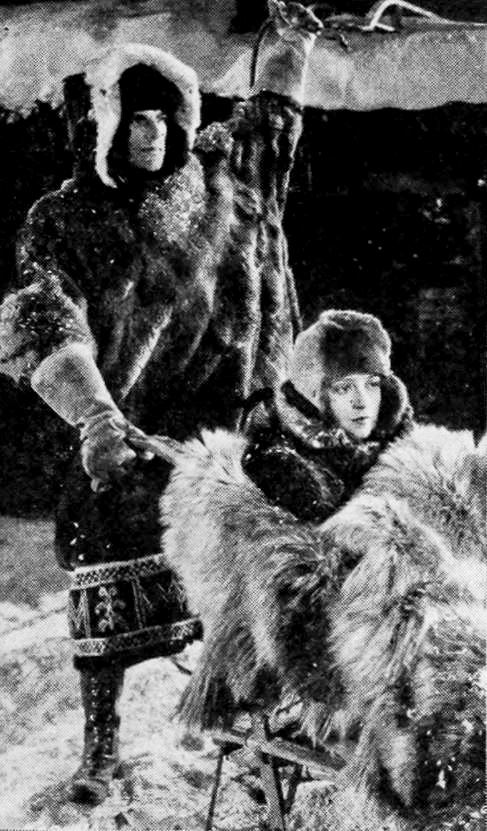
- Film still
- Directed by: Ernst Laemmle
- Written by: Charles Logue (adaptation & scenario); Tom Reed (titles); Buford Bennett (titles)
- Based on: The Yukon Trail, A Tale of the North by William MacLeod Raine
- Starring: Francis X. Bushman; Neil Hamilton
- Cinematography: Jackson Rose
- Edited by: Maurice Pivar; Ted J. Kent
- Production company: Universal Pictures
- Distributed by: Universal Pictures
- Release date: July 9, 1928
- Running time: 65 minutes
- Country: United States
- Language: Silent (English intertitles)

The Grip of the Yukon is a 1928 American silent Western film directed by Ernst Laemmle, the nephew of Universal Pictures founder Carl Laemmle. The film starred Francis X. Bushman and Neil Hamilton, and is based on a novel by William MacLeod Raine, "The Yukon Trail, A Tale of the North".

== Plot ==
An old-time Alaskan miner dies and leaves his fortune and holdings to his daughter in the states. She comes north and is befriended by two old friends of her father. And she needs all the befriending they can provide as a true-blue villain has designs on her holdings and attributes.

== Cast ==
- Francis X. Bushman as Colby MacDonald
- Neil Hamilton as Jack Elliott
- June Marlowe as Sheila O'Neil
- Otis Harlan as Farrell O'Neil
- Burr McIntosh as Chardon, hotel-keeper
- James Farley as Sheriff

== Production ==
The film was shot during the summer of 1927 on Stage 28, where the interior was transformed into a glacier.

== Preservation status ==
A copy of The Grip of the Yukon is held by Lobster Films, Paris.
