= The Lonesome Trail (1930 film) =

1930 film directed by Bruce Mitchell

- Directed by: Bruce Mitchell
- Written by: G. A. Durlam
- Produced by: G. A. Durlam
- Starring: Charles Delaney; Ben Corbett; Jimmy Aubrey
- Edited by: G. A. Durlam
- Production company: G. A. Durlam Productions
- Distributed by: Syndicate Pictures Corp.
- Release date: August 7, 1930 (US)
- Running time: 57 minutes
- Country: United States
- Language: English

The Lonesome Trail is a 1930 American Western film directed by Bruce Mitchell, starring Charles Delaney, Ben Corbett, and Jimmy Aubrey. It premiered in New York City on August 7, 1930.

== Cast ==
- Charles Delaney as Judd Rascomb
- Ben Corbett as Sweetheart
- Jimmy Aubrey as Tenderfoot
- Monte Montague as Gila Red
- Virginia Brown Faire as Martha
- Bill McCall as Rankin
- George Berliner as Crabb
- George Hackathorne as Oswald
- William Von Brincken as Man in white sombrero
- George Regas as The Ring Tailored Roarer
- Lafe McKee as Sheriff
- Yakima Canutt as Two Gun
- Bob Reeves as Alkali
- Art Mix as Slim
