= Seventh Commandment =

The Seventh Commandment of the Ten Commandments could refer to:

- "Thou shalt not commit adultery", under the Philonic division used by Hellenistic Jews, Greek Orthodox and Protestants except Lutherans, or the Talmudic division of the third-century Jewish Talmud
- "Thou shalt not steal", under the Augustinian division used by Roman Catholics and Lutherans

== See also ==
- The Seventh Commandment (disambiguation), the title of several films
