= Dante's Inferno (1924 film) =

1924 film by Henry Otto

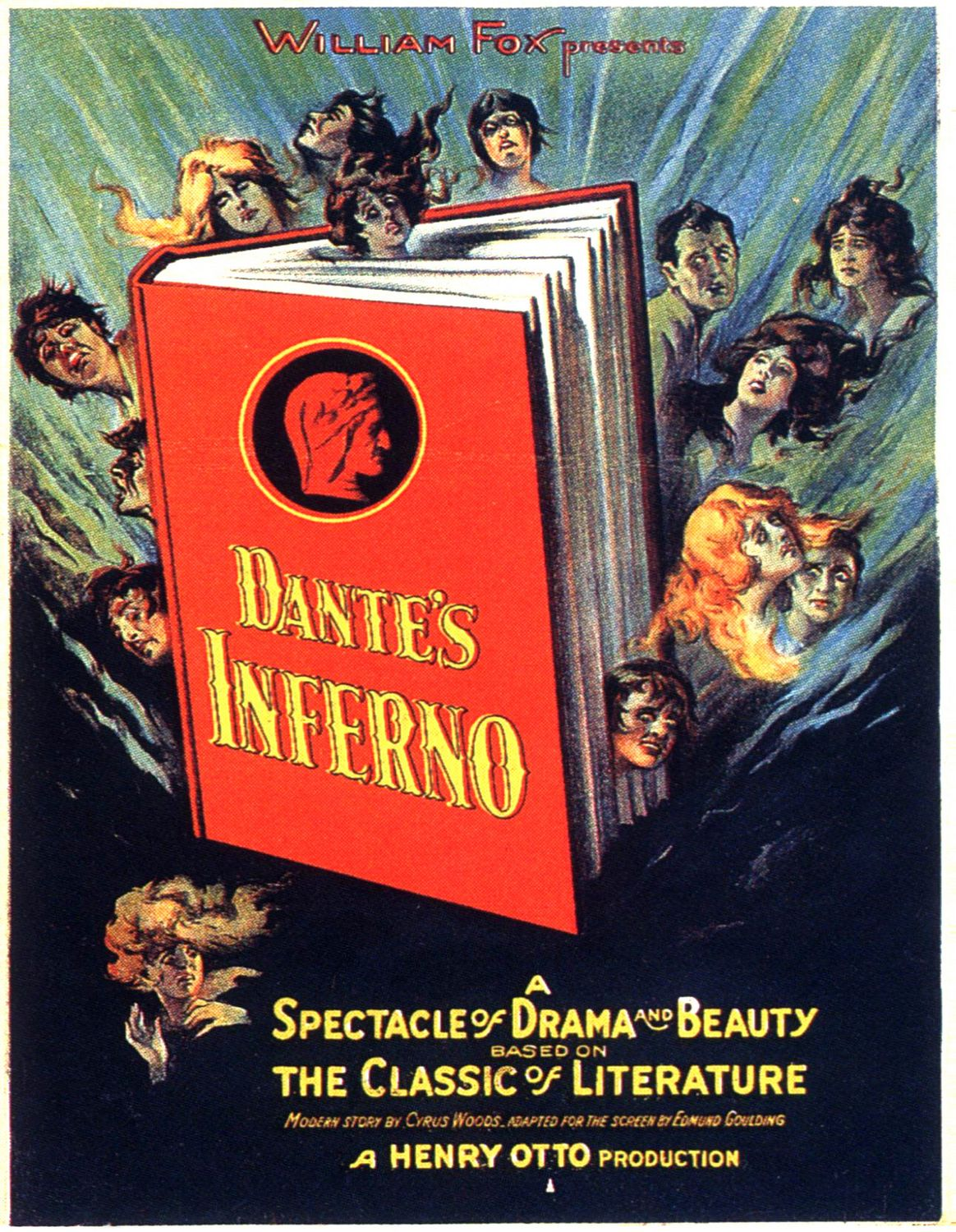
- Theatrical poster
- Directed by: Henry Otto
- Written by: Edmund Goulding (screenplay)
- Story by: Cyrus Wood
- Based on: Inferno by Dante Alighieri
- Produced by: Fox Film
- Starring: Pauline Starke; Ralph Lewis; Josef Swickard; Gloria Grey
- Cinematography: Joseph August
- Distributed by: Fox Film Corporation
- Release date: September 7, 1924
- Running time: 60 minutes
- Country: United States
- Language: Silent (English intertitles)
- Budget: $102,000
- Box office: $514,000

Dante's Inferno is a 1924 American silent drama horror film directed by Henry Otto that was released by Fox Film Corporation and adapted from Inferno, part of Dante Alighieri's epic poem Divine Comedy. The film mixes material from Dante's "Inferno" with plot points from Charles Dickens' A Christmas Carol. The book was filmed earlier in 1911 in Italy as L'Inferno, and Fox later remade the film in 1935, again as Dante's Inferno, starring Spencer Tracy in the lead role.

== Plot ==
The tactics of a vicious slumlord and greedy businessman named Mortimer Judd finally drive a distraught man named Eugene Craig, whom he has forced into bankruptcy, to commit suicide. He constantly refuses requests for charity and treats his bedridden wife very badly. The businessman receives a copy of Dante's Inferno in the mail and reads it. In the story, a floating angel raises its sword and parts a legion of demons to allow Dante to pass, naked sinners burn in boiling tar and suicides are transformed into living trees in a forest in Hell. Judd is plunged into a frightening dream in which he is tried for murder and executed, and is afterward taken by demons to Hell where he will spend the rest of eternity. The nightmare teaches him humility and the importance of extending charity to those less fortunate than himself. He gets the chance to redeem himself by preventing Eugene Craig from committing suicide.

== Cast ==
- Ralph Lewis as Mortimer Judd
- Winifred Landis as Mrs. Judd
- William Scott as Ernest Judd
- Pauline Starke as Nursei Marjorie Vernon
- Josef Swickard as Eugene Craig
- Gloria Grey as Mildred Craig
- Lorimer Johnston as The doctor
- Lawson Butt as Dante
- Howard Gaye as Virgil
- Bud Jamison as The butler (uncredited, in blackface)
- Carmencita Johnson as Baby (uncredited)
- Noble Johnson as Devil with lash whipping woman (uncredited)
- Robert Klein as A Friend (uncredited)
- Diana Miller as Beatrice (uncredited)
- Lon Poff as Secretary (uncredited)
- Carrie Clark Ward as Singer in radio program (uncredited)

== Production ==
This film, like several previous Fox Films such as The Queen of Sheba, A Daughter of the Gods and some Theda Bara films, featured full nudity in some sequences. Actress Pauline Starke is completely nude in the Hell sequences, with the exception of a large flowing black wig that covers her nether regions. Some bit players and extras are fully nude. The different prints of the film were more than likely edited according to the attitudes of the different regions or parts of the world they played in. The film also features popular comic actor Bud Jamison in blackface as a butler; he is easily recognizable under the makeup, and his initial appearance has caused some laughter by knowledgeable film buffs at its occasional screenings.

Some hell scene footage from the film was reused in the 1935 film Dante's Inferno.

For his 1980 sci-fi thriller Altered States director Ken Russell intercut borrowed footage from this film with his own digital effects to create a hallucination sequence.

== Criticism ==
Critic Christopher Workman writes "Despite some massive striking sets and a few truly magnificent moments....the repeated red-tinted shots of bodies writhing in flames get old quick. Without much story to shore it up, the film falls flat well before its conclusion.... But (the 1935 version) was even less interesting, with the vision of Hell compressed into a single 10-minute segment."

== Preservation ==
The UCLA Film and Television Archive has an incomplete print, three reels out of a total of five reels. A print of the film reportedly also survives at the Museum of Modern Art. Some of the original prints of this film had the scenes in hell tinted in red.

== See also ==
- Nudity in film
- Pre-Code Hollywood
