= The Faker =

1929 film directed by Phil Rosen

- Directed by: Phil Rosen
- Written by: Howard J. Green
- Based on: a story by Rupert Hughes
- Produced by: Harry Cohn
- Starring: Jacqueline Logan; Charles Delaney; Warner Oland
- Cinematography: Ted Tetzlaff
- Edited by: William Hamilton
- Production company: Columbia Pictures
- Distributed by: Columbia Pictures
- Release date: January 2, 1929 (US)
- Running time: 6 reels
- Country: United States
- Language: Silent (English intertitles)

The Faker is a 1929 American silent melodrama film, directed by Phil Rosen. It stars Jacqueline Logan, Charles Delaney, and Warner Oland, and was released on January 2, 1929.

== Plot ==
Rita Martin is the assistant to Hadrian, a fake spiritualist who cons people out of their money. When they arrive in town, she gets a job as secretary to John Clayton, a local wealthy man. It is her job to get information about him that she can pass along to Hadrian, allowing "the faker" to dupe him. John has been set up by his worthless son, Frank, who the elder Clayton has removed from his will, leaving everything to his stepson, Bob Williams.

As she is collecting the information, Rita and Bob fall in love. Frank wants Hadrian to hold a fake seance and pretend that John's dead ex-wife is asking John to reconcile with Frank. When Rita realizes what her intelligence gathering is setting up to happen, she cannot bear to know that she is being used against Bob. During the seance, she is posing as the spirit of the dead Mrs. Clayton, but instead exposes Hadrian as a fraud. Initially, Bob despises her just as much as her boss, but the two reconcile.

== Cast list ==
- Jacqueline Logan as Rita Martin
- Charles Delaney as Bob Williams
- Warner Oland as Hadrian, the faker
- Charles Hill Mailes as John Clayton
- Gaston Glass as Frank Clayton
- Flora Finch as Emma
- David Mir as Believer
- Lon Poff as Hadrian's aid
- Fred Kelsey as Detective

== Production ==
In November 1928 it was revealed that Jacqueline Logan, Warner Oland, and Gaston Glass had been signed by Columbia Pictures for featured roles in the upcoming film, The Faker, which was based on a story by Rupert Hughes.

== Reception ==
Photoplay magazine gave the film a positive review, saying it was "extraordinarily well done". The Film Daily, on the other hand, gave the film a poor review, "Weak, with very artificial story and poor characterization. A lot of spiritualist faking stuff doesn't click." There was not an aspect of the film which they gave good grades too, marking direction, story, photography, and acting all as poor. The Napa Daily Register enjoyed the picture, saying it was "a screen novelty that stands in a class by itself. The luxurious and weird backgrounds of seaside resorts, country estates and bizarre seance parlors afford opportunity for gripping drama, uncanny phenomena and a poignant love story..." Harrison's Reports also gave the film a positive review, calling it "A very good expose of the fake means used by mediums in their endeavors to mulct their credulous victims of large sums of money." The complimented the acting of Logan, Delaney, Oland and Glass.

== Preservation and status ==
Complete copies are held at the Archives Du Film Du CNC and the Cinémathèque française.
