= Charles Delaney =

American actor (1892–1959)

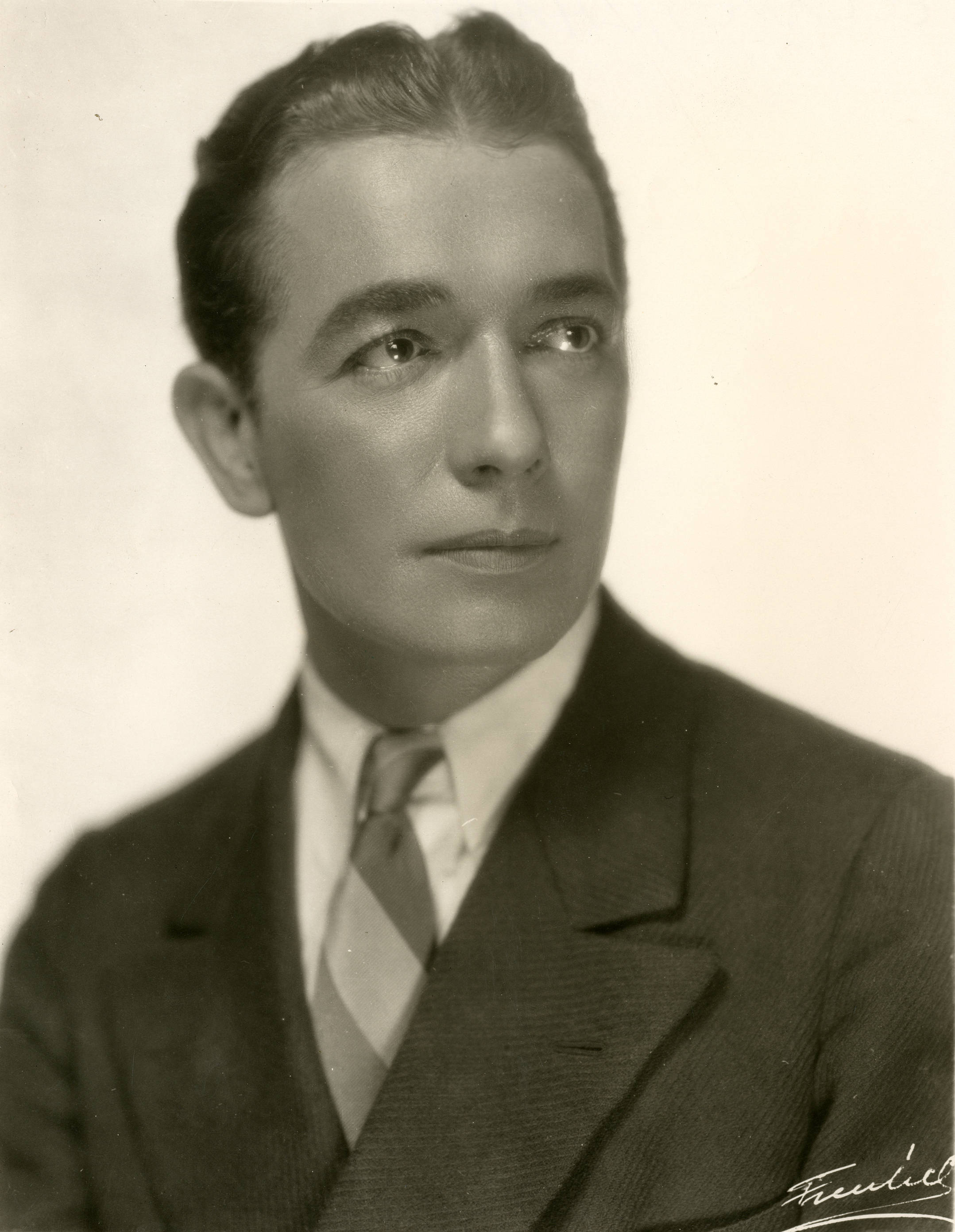
- Delaney in 1923
- Born: August 9, 1892; New York City, U.S.
- Died: August 31, 1959 (aged 67); Hollywood, California, U.S.
- Occupation: Actor
- Years active: 1913–1959
- Spouse: Mary Meek

Charles Delaney (August 9, 1892 – August 31, 1959) was an American actor.

== Biography ==
Delaney was born in New York City in 1892. He was originally a motor mechanic and having learned to fly during World War I, he started doing flying vaudeville acts on his return to civilian life before beginning to appear in films. He appeared in more than 90 films between 1913 and 1959. Delaney died in Hollywood in 1959. His final screen appearance was a supporting role in the independently produced low-budget feature The Beatniks which was released posthumously in 1960. Delaney bore a resemblance to film star Tom Moore.

== Selected filmography ==
- Solomon in Society (1922)
- Those Who Dance (1924)
- Enemies of Youth (1925)
- Accused (1925)
- The Night Watch (1926)
- Satan Town (1926)
- The Jade Cup (1926)
- College Days (1926)
- The Silent Power (1926)
- Flaming Fury (1926)
- Husband Hunters (1927)
- The Silent Avenger (1927)
- The Tired Business Man (1927)
- Frisco Sally Levy (1927)
- The Thirteenth Hour (1927)
- The Main Event (1927)
- The Lovelorn (1927)
- Mountains of Manhattan (1927)
- The Cohens and the Kellys in Paris (1928)
- After the Storm (1928)
- The Air Circus (1928)
- The Branded Man (1928)
- Outcast Souls (1928)
- Show Girl (1928)
- The River Woman (1928)
- Women Who Dare (1928)
- Stool Pigeon (1928)
- Home, James (1928)
- Do Your Duty (1928)
- Hard to Get (1929)
- Broadway Babies (1929)
- The Clean Up (1929)
- The Girl from Woolworth's (1929)
- The Faker (1929)
- Around the Corner (1930)
- Playthings of Hollywood (1930)
- The Lonesome Trail (1930)
- Hell-Bent for Frisco (1931)
- Midnight Morals (1932)
- Hearts of Humanity (1932)
- Big Time or Bust (1933)
- The Important Witness (1933)
- What Price Crime (1935)
- Trails of the Wild (1935)
- Bank Alarm (1937)
- Kansas Raiders (1950)
- The Beatniks (1960)
