= James Harrison (actor) =

American actor

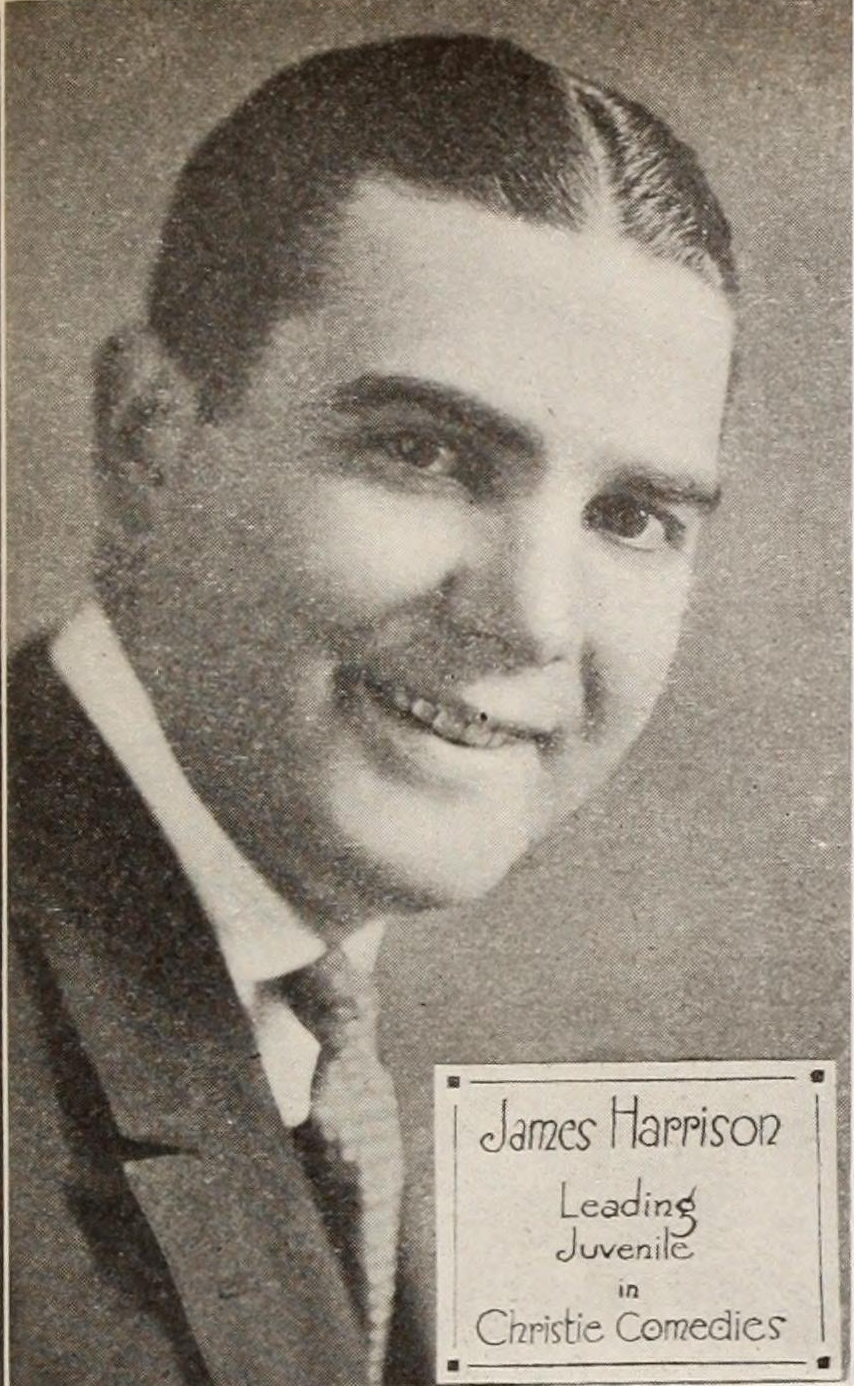
- James Harrison c. 1920
- Born: July 1, 1891; Milwaukee, Wisconsin, United States
- Died: June 24, 1986 (aged 94); San Bernardino, California, United States
- Occupation: Actor
- Years active: 1911–1953 (film)

James Harrison (July 1, 1891 – June 24, 1986) was an American film actor. He began his career acting in short films in 1911. He was a supporting actor during much of the silent era. Although he continued to appear in films until the 1950s, many of his latter roles were small, uncredited parts.

== Selected filmography ==
- The Flirt and the Bandit (1913)
- The Tale of the Ticker (1913)
- Madame Bo-Peep (1917)
- The Bad Boy (1917)
- Should She Obey? (1917)
- Lessons in Love (1921)
- Wedding Bells (1921)
- The Barricade (1921)
- A Heart to Let (1921)
- Women Men Marry (1922)
- Beyond the Rainbow (1922)
- Why Announce Your Marriage? (1922)
- Glengarry School Days (1923)
- Charley's Aunt (1925)
- Stop Flirting (1925)
- In Search of a Hero (1926)
- College Days (1926)
- Backstage (1927)
- Husband Hunters (1927)
- The Wife's Relations (1928)
- Handcuffed (1929)
- The Seventh Commandment (1932)
- King Kong (1933)
- Let 'Em Have It (1935)
- The Public Menace (1935)
- She Couldn't Take It (1935)
- The Lawless Nineties (1936)
- The Saint in Palm Springs (1941)
- The Mexican Spitfire's Baby (1941)
- Up in Arms (1944)
- The Woman in the Window (1944)
- King of the Bandits (1947)
- Panhandle (1948)
- Silent Conflict (1948)
- Silver River (1948)
- Borrowed Trouble (1948)
- Law of the West (1949)
- Stampede (1949)
- Western Renegades (1949)
- Fighting Man of the Plains (1949)
- Ambush (1950)
- Key to the City (1950)
- Annie Get Your Gun (1950)
- Vengeance Valley (1951)
- Inside Straight (1951)
- The Tall Target (1951)
- Carbine Williams (1952)

== Bibliography ==
- Goble, Alan. The Complete Index to Literary Sources in Film. Walter de Gruyter, 1999.
