= Heartless Husbands =

1925 film

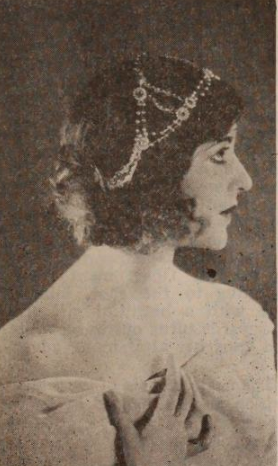
- Gloria Grey in the film.
- Directed by: Bertram Bracken
- Written by: Burl R. Tuttle
- Produced by: Harry Vallet
- Starring: Gloria Grey; Thomas G. Lingham; Vola Vale
- Cinematography: Gordon Pollock
- Production company: Sun Motion Pictures
- Distributed by: Madoc Sales
- Release date: October 5, 1925
- Running time: 50 minutes
- Country: United States
- Languages: Silent; English intertitles

Heartless Husbands is a 1925 American silent drama film directed by Bertram Bracken and starring Gloria Grey, Thomas G. Lingham and Vola Vale.

== Cast ==
- John T. Prince as James Carleton
- Gloria Grey as Mary Kayne
- Thomas G. Lingham as Jackson Cain
- Vola Vale as Mrs. Jackson Cain
- Edna Hall as Minnie Blake
- L.J. O'Connor as Detective Kelly
- Waldo Moretti as Sonny

== Bibliography ==
- Connelly, Robert B. The Silents: Silent Feature Films, 1910-36, Volume 40, Issue 2. December Press, 1998.
- Munden, Kenneth White. The American Film Institute Catalog of Motion Pictures Produced in the United States, Part 1. University of California Press, 1997.
