= Blockade (1928 film) =

1928 film

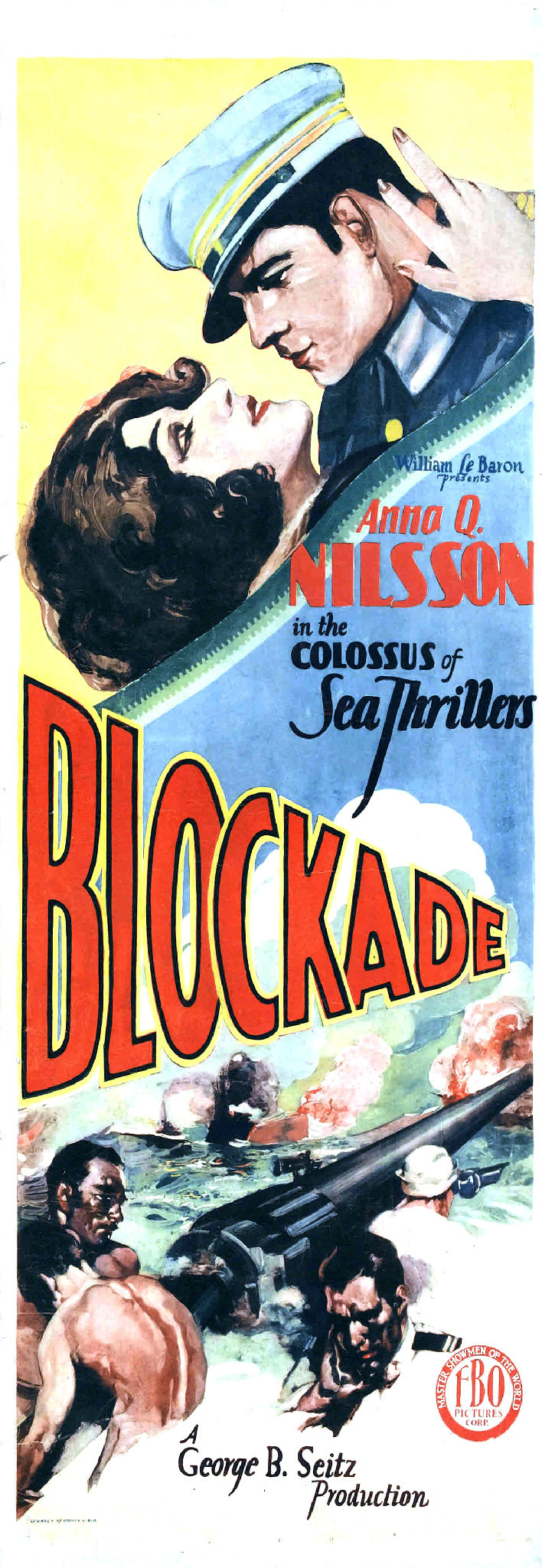
- Film poster
- Directed by: George B. Seitz; Thomas Atkins (assistant)
- Written by: George LeMaire; Louis Sarecky
- Starring: Anna Q. Nilsson
- Cinematography: Robert Martin
- Edited by: Archie Marshek
- Distributed by: Film Booking Offices of America (FBO)
- Release date: December 16, 1928
- Running time: 70 minutes
- Country: United States
- Languages: Sound (Part-Talkie); English Intertitles

Blockade is a 1928 American sound part-talkie drama film directed by George B. Seitz. In addition to sequences with audible dialogue or talking sequences, the film features a synchronized musical score and sound effects along with English intertitles. The soundtrack was recorded using the RCA Photophone sound-on-film system.

== Plot ==
From the islands of Nassau to the hidden keys of Florida, the name Bess Maitland has become legend—spoken with awe by rum-runners and pirates alike. Beautiful, bold, and as ruthless as any seafaring outlaw, she captains the swift yacht The Fury, launching daring raids on heavily laden liquor convoys anchored offshore.

Meanwhile, in a sleepy coastal town cloaked in respectability, Arnold Gwynn poses as a retired philanthropist. In truth, he masterminds a vast smuggling empire that sails between the Bahamas and Florida. His fleet, under the command of the hard-bitten Hayden, is the lifeblood of the rum trade. When Gwynn encounters Bess—posing under the alias Miss Van Syke—he is charmed, unaware of her true identity as a scourge of his operations.

But Bess's mask slips when a coded message warns her that Hayden’s fleet is again on the move. That night, The Fury strikes the rum runners—but Bess is captured during the skirmish. Held aboard one of Gwynn’s ships, she escapes in a lifeboat and drifts for hours, helpless and oarless, until rescued by Vincent Goddard, a young millionaire sportsman with a sleek speedboat and a curious eye.

Ashore, Hayden recognizes her and reports to Gwynn. Suspecting that Vincent is none other than the elusive "Agent Canavan", a top revenue officer, they set a trap—inviting him to Nassau under the guise of a real estate deal. But Bess, sensing treachery, races ahead and confronts Gwynn. When he proposes that they work together to eliminate Vincent, she agrees—on the condition that she gets to pull the trigger.

Out at sea, Bess accepts Vincent’s invitation to cruise. Once out from shore, she orders him overboard at gunpoint and fires a shot. Watching from afar, Hayden believes she has fulfilled her promise. But Bess has other plans: Vincent is captured and held aboard The Fury, now manned by Hayden’s loyalists and loaded with contraband.

Feigning fury at Vincent’s “survival,” Bess forces him to radio a fake message in code, calling off the nearby revenue cutter. The signature: "Canavan." With both rum vessels now headed for Florida, Bess turns—and with Vincent’s help—sets off a flare into the night.

As Gwynn’s shore men prepare to receive the illegal cargo, a detachment of marines routs them in a surprise raid. Back aboard The Fury, Vincent seizes a machine gun and holds Gwynn’s crew at bay until Bess’s own men, swinging from ropes, storm the vessel and drive the smugglers to retreat.

But Hayden isn’t done. His ship opens fire with a deck cannon, battering The Fury into flaming wreckage. Just in time, a revenue cutter answers the flare and charges in at full speed. From the skies, a bomber plane appears, drenching the sea with search flares as chaos erupts.

Amid blinding explosions and hand-to-hand combat, the pirates are finally overpowered. In the aftermath, aboard the cutter, the mystery of Agent Canavan is laid bare—Bess herself had been the undercover agent all along.

With her mission complete and the blockade broken, Bess accepts Vincent’s plea to leave the service behind. Love has triumphed over law—and a legendary outlaw finds her peace not in the sea, but in his arms.

== Cast ==
- Anna Q. Nilsson as Bess
- Wallace MacDonald as Vincent
- James Bradbury Sr. as Gwynn
- Walter McGrail as Hayden

== Production ==
Blockade was shot on location at Catalina Island.

== See also ==
- List of early sound feature films (1926–1929)
