= The Mysterious Stranger (1925 film) =

1925 silent film

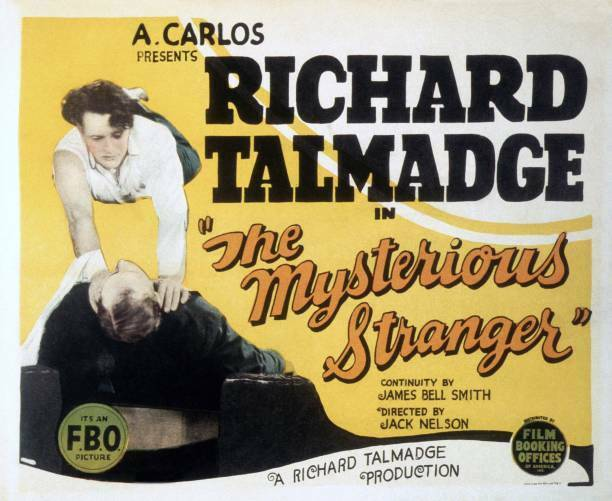
- Lobby card
- Directed by: Jack Nelson
- Written by: James Bell Smith
- Starring: Richard Talmadge; Josef Swickard; Carmelita Geraghty
- Production companies: Carlos Productions; Truart Film Corporation
- Distributed by: Film Booking Offices of America
- Release date: July 5, 1925
- Running time: 60 minutes
- Country: United States
- Language: Silent (English intertitles)

The Mysterious Stranger is a 1925 American silent drama film directed by Jack Nelson and starring Richard Talmadge, Josef Swickard, and Carmelita Geraghty.

== Plot ==
As described in a film magazine review, Raoul Lesage, a great artist, lives happily in his large home with his four-year-old son Paul and his wife April until he is deceived by Herman Bennett, who attempts to caress April. Raoul believes his wife has been unfaithful and takes the child to another home. Paul Lesage grows to be 24 years old without having seen a woman. Bennet, who is also an artist, has spent the last twenty years forging the works of the master Lesage. Paul starts walking in his sleep. He is picked up by a band of merrymakers and is taken to a roadhouse where he meets Helen Dresden, the ward of Bennett. The two fall in love. Police raid the roadhouse and Paul prevents the arrest of Helen. Bennett engages Paul to paint for him, but Paul does not know that the name Lesage is to be forged on the artwork. Bennett buys the house where April has long been the housekeeper, waiting for her husband and son to return to her. She is bound by sentiment to remain in the house. She is put in the tower of the house; she is told that Paul will be branded in the face. Paul breaks away, takes his mother and Helen, and escapes from the house. Bennett pursues them and is killed when his car goes over a cliff. Paul and Helen plight their troth, promising to be true to each other.

== Cast ==
- Richard Talmadge as Paul Lesage
- Josef Swickard as Raoul Lesage
- Carmelita Geraghty as April Lesage
- Sheldon Lewis as Herman Bennett
- Duane Thompson as Helen Dresden
- Bert Bradley as Arnold
- Robert Carlson as Chauffeur
- Hazel Deane
- Stepin Fetchit

== Bibliography ==
- Munden, Kenneth White. The American Film Institute Catalog of Motion Pictures Produced in the United States, Part 1. University of California Press, 1997.
