= Some Pun'kins =

1925 film

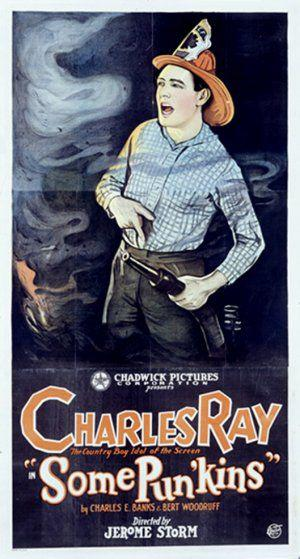
- theatrical poster
- Directed by: Jerome Storm
- Written by: Charles E. Banks; Bert Woodruff
- Produced by: I.E. Chadwick
- Starring: Charles Ray; Duane Thompson; George Fawcett
- Cinematography: James S. Brown Jr. Philip Tannura
- Production company: Chadwick Pictures
- Distributed by: Chadwick Pictures
- Release date: September 29, 1925
- Running time: 60 minutes
- Country: United States
- Language: Silent (English intertitles)

Some Pun'kins is a 1925 American silent comedy drama film directed by Jerome Storm and starring Charles Ray, Duane Thompson, and George Fawcett. It is also known by the alternative title of The Farmer's Boy.

== Plot ==
As described in a review in a film magazine, in this light rural comedy, Lem Blossom falls in love with Mary Griggs, already the possessor of a beau in the worldly person of Tom Perkins. Mary's pa Josh Griggs, a heavy drinking father, frowns on the romance but Lem perseveres. When Lem fails to sell a load of pumpkins, his father in desperation turns to bootlegging. Mrs. Blossom and Lem smell the bottles, and Pa Blossom drives Lem away. On the way to the station Lem conceives the idea of obtaining a corner on pumpkins and puts it over to the tune of thousands of dollars. Mary's house takes fire and Lem, after trying the fire-pumper he invented, risks his life to save her life. Everything, then is rosy. Lem has both money and the affections of the young woman.

== Cast ==
- Charles Ray as Lem Blossom
- Duane Thompson as Mary Griggs
- George Fawcett as Pa Blossom
- Fanny Midgley as Ma Blossom
- Bert Woodruff as Josh Griggs
- Hallam Cooley as Tom Perkins
- William Courtright as Constable
- Ida Lewis as Gossip
- Peggy Ahern as Young Girl (uncredited)

== Preservation ==
With no complete prints of Some Pun'kins located in any film archives, it is a lost film. Thirty-five millimeter prints of reels 4 and 6 are held at Chicago Film Archives.

== Bibliography ==
- Buck Rainey. Sweethearts of the Sage: Biographies and Filmographies of 258 Actresses Appearing in Western Movies. McFarland, 1992.
