= The Night Watch (1926 film) =

1926 film

- Directed by: Fred Caldwell
- Starring: Mary Carr; Charles Delaney; Gloria Grey
- Distributed by: Truart Films
- Release date: March 2, 1926
- Running time: 50 minutes
- Country: USA
- Language: Silent..English titles

The Night Watch is a lost 1926 silent film directed by Fred Caldwell. It starred Mary Carr, Charles Delaney and Gloria Grey.

== Cast ==
- Mary Carr as Mrs. Blackwell
- Charles Delaney as George Blackwell
- Gloria Grey as Nellie Powell
- Jack Richardson as Mr. Powell
- Muriel Reynolds -
- Raymond Rousenville -
- Ethel Schram -
- Charles W. Mack -
