= The Silent Avenger =

1927 film

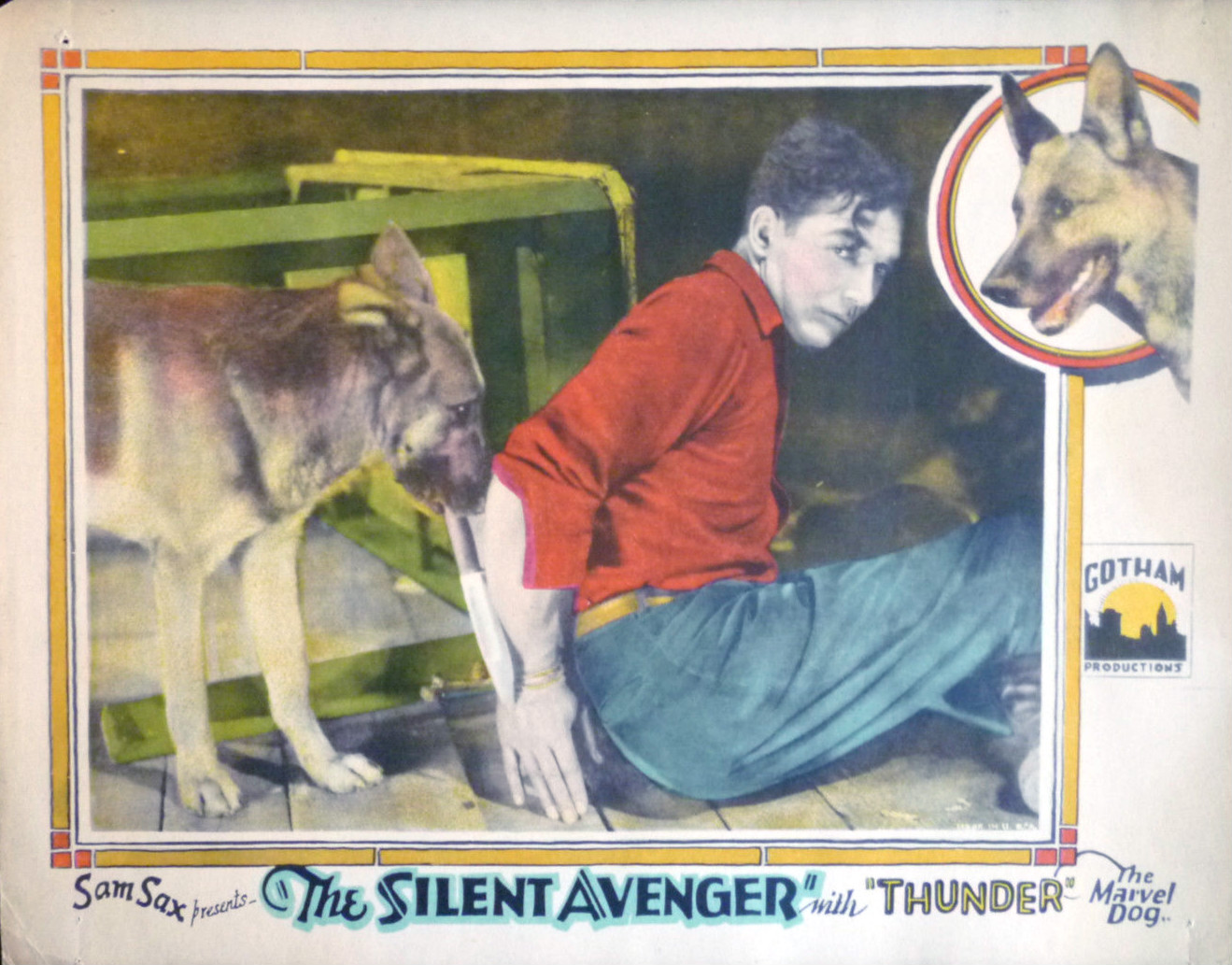
- Directed by: James P. Hogan
- Written by: Frank Foster Davis; George Green; Doris Schroeder; Herbert C. Clark; Delos Sutherland
- Produced by: Samuel Sax
- Starring: Charles Delaney; Duane Thompson; George Chesebro
- Cinematography: Ray June
- Edited by: Fred Burnworth
- Production company: Gotham Productions
- Distributed by: Lumas Film Corporation
- Release date: May 5, 1927
- Running time: 60 minutes
- Country: United States
- Languages: Silent; English intertitles

The Silent Avenger is a 1927 American silent action film directed by James P. Hogan and starring Charles Delaney, Duane Thompson and George Chesebro.

== Cast ==
- Thunder the Dog as Thunder
- Charles Delaney as Stanley Gilmore
- Duane Thompson as Patsy Wade
- George Chesebro as Bill Garton
- David Kirby as Joe Sneed
- Robert Homans as Steven Gilmore
- Clarence Wilson as Dave Wade
- Buck Black as Bud Wade

== Bibliography ==
- Munden, Kenneth White. The American Film Institute Catalog of Motion Pictures Produced in the United States, Part 1. University of California Press, 1997.
