= Geared to Go =

1924 film directed by Albert S. Rogell

- Directed by: Albert S. Rogell
- Written by: John Grey; Henry Roberts Symonds
- Produced by: W. Ray Johnston
- Starring: Reed Howes; Carmelita Geraghty; George Nichols
- Cinematography: Ross Fisher
- Production company: Harry J. Brown Productions
- Distributed by: Rayart Pictures
- Release date: December 15, 1924
- Country: United States
- Languages: Silent; English intertitles

Geared to Go is a 1924 American silent action film directed by Albert S. Rogell and starring Reed Howes, Carmelita Geraghty and George Nichols.

== Cast ==
- Reed Howes
- Carmelita Geraghty
- George Nichols
- Winifred Landis
- Joe Butterworth
- Cuyler Supplee
- Melbourne MacDowell
- George B. Williams

== Bibliography ==
- Darby, William. Masters of Lens and Light: A Checklist of Major Cinematographers and Their Feature Films. Scarecrow Press, 1991.
