= Red Clay (film) =

1927 film

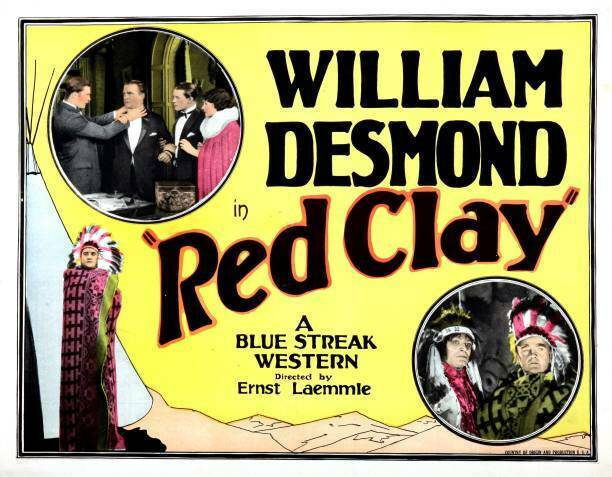
- Directed by: Ernst Laemmle
- Written by: Charles A. Logue; Sarah Saddoris; Richard Thorpe; Ruth Todd
- Produced by: Carl Laemmle
- Starring: William Desmond; Marceline Day; Albert J. Smith
- Cinematography: Benjamin H. Kline
- Production company: Universal Pictures
- Distributed by: Universal Pictures
- Release date: April 17, 1927
- Running time: 50 minutes
- Country: United States
- Languages: Silent; English intertitles

Red Clay is a 1927 American silent Western film directed by Ernst Laemmle and starring William Desmond, Marceline Day and Albert J. Smith.

== Synopsis ==
Native American John Nisheto serves with the American Army in France during World War I where he saves the life of Jack Burr, the son of a senator. Back in the United States Jack, not realising it is the same man who saved him, objects to John's courting of his sister due to his ethnicity despite John's success as a scholar and athlete. Only too late does Jack come to realise the truth after John is mortally wounded.

== Cast ==
- William Desmond as Chief John Nisheto
- Marceline Day as Agnes Burr
- Albert J. Smith as Jack Burr
- Byron Douglas as Sen. Burr
- Billy Sullivan as Bobb Lee
- Lola Todd as Betty Morgan
- Noble Johnson as Chief Bear Paw
- Felix Whitefeather as Indian chief
- Ynez Seabury as Minnie Bear Paw

== Bibliography ==
- Connelly, Robert B. The Silents: Silent Feature Films, 1910-36, Volume 40, Issue 2. December Press, 1998.
- Munden, Kenneth White. The American Film Institute Catalog of Motion Pictures Produced in the United States, Part 1. University of California Press, 1997.
