= The No-Gun Man =

1924 film

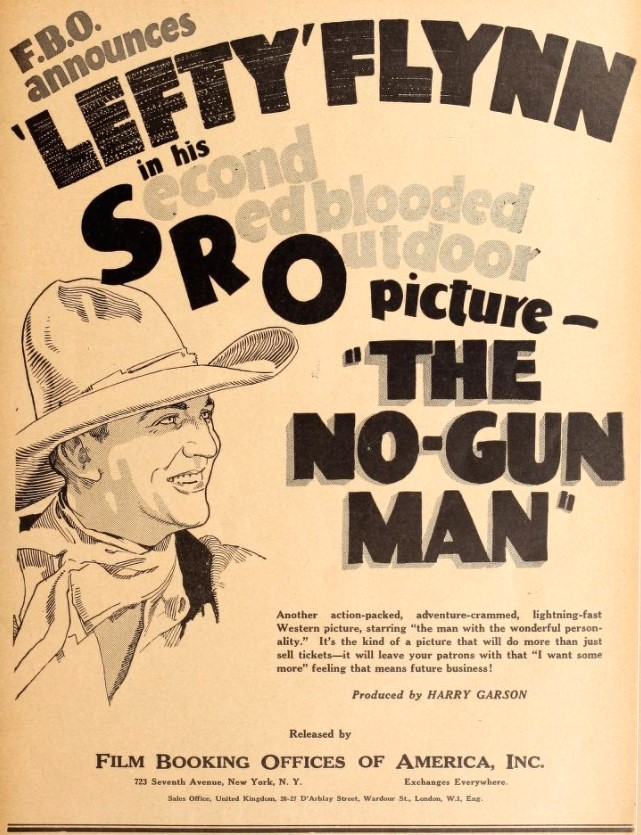
- Advertisement
- Directed by: Harry Garson
- Written by: Dorothy Arzner; Paul Gangelin
- Produced by: Harry Garson
- Starring: Maurice 'Lefty' Flynn; William Quinn; Gloria Grey
- Cinematography: Lewis W. Physioc
- Production company: Harry Garson Productions
- Distributed by: Film Booking Offices of America (FBO)
- Release date: December 27, 1924
- Running time: 50 minutes
- Country: United States
- Languages: Silent; English intertitles

The No-Gun Man is a 1924 American silent Western film directed by Harry Garson and starring Maurice 'Lefty' Flynn, William Quinn, and Gloria Grey.

== Plot ==
As described in a review in a film magazine, following the robbery of a suburban bank, the small town of Red Rock is terrorized by the appearance of a gang led by Bill Kilgore. After failing to impress Carmen Harroway, who runs a small store, he will not allow the townspeople to trade with her. Bob Vincent, a stranger to town, wins the friendship of Carmen and shows that he does not fear Bill. The populace is mystified when Bob becomes friendly with Bill and joins the Kilgore gang. Bill plans the robbery of the train and kidnapping of Carmen. Bob saves her, but she does not trust him, which makes his job more difficult. The townspeople finally arise and defeat the Kilgore gang, and Bob, who is knocked out and left on the railroad track, saves himself and the train. It is revealed that Bob is the president of the bank that was robbed, and now has secured the evidence to arrest Bill Kilgore and his gang. Carmen accepts his invitation to become a banker's wife.

== Cast ==
- Maurice 'Lefty' Flynn as Robert Gerome Vincent
- William Quinn as Bill Kilgore
- Gloria Grey as Carmen Harroway
- Ray Turner as Obediah Abraham Lincoln Brown
- Bob Reeves as Oklahoma George
- Harry McCabe as Snooper
- J. Gordon Russell as Tom West

== Preservation ==
With no copies of The No-Gun Man located in any film archives, it is a lost film.

== Bibliography ==
- Langman, Larry. A Guide to Silent Westerns. Greenwood Publishing Group, 1992.
