= Gloria Grey =

American actress

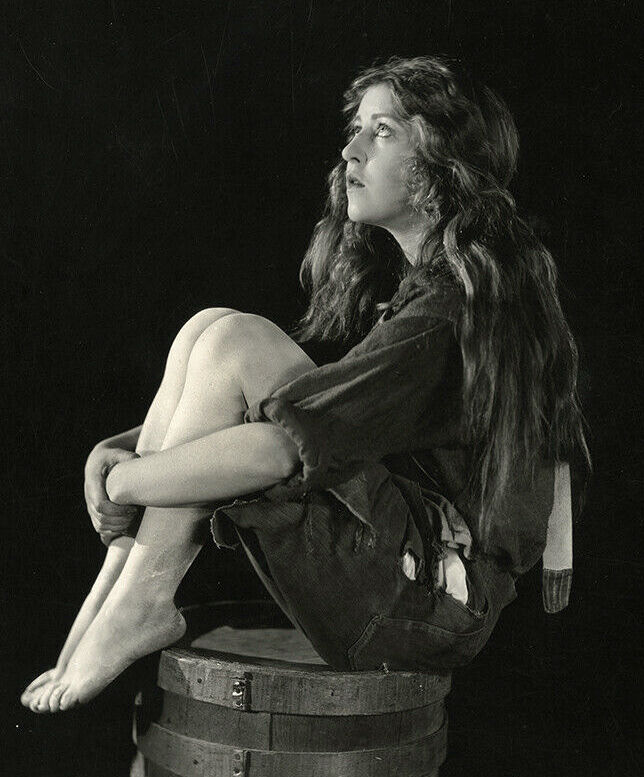
- Grey c. 1920s
- Born: Maria Dragomanovich; October 23, 1909; Portland, Oregon, U.S.
- Died: November 22, 1947 (aged 38); Los Angeles, California, U.S.
- Resting place: Westwood Village Memorial Park Cemetery
- Occupation: Actress
- Spouse: Ramón Romero (m. 1929)
- Children: 1

Gloria Grey (born Maria Dragomanovich; October 23, 1909 – November 22, 1947) was an American screen and stage actress and director, appearing in mainly dramatic/romantic films during the silent era and after.

== Career ==
Grey was born Maria Dragomanovich in Portland, Oregon in 1909. She was educated in San Francisco, California. Before beginning her career in film, Grey appeared onstage in vaudeville shows with the Gus Edwards Revue. Her career was spent chiefly during the 1920s in Hollywood, and the 1940s in Argentina. Her first film credit was the 1923 movie Bag and Baggage.

She was given praise for her starring role in the 1924 adaptation of Gene Stratton-Porter's A Girl of the Limberlost, which garnered her the honor of being selected as one of the WAMPAS Baby Stars in 1924. However, the film did little else to improve her career. She also appeared in an action serial titled Blake of Scotland Yard.

Grey appeared in 33 films (Note: The American Film Institute erroneously lists several films made after Grey's death as being part of her filmography; among them are Holiday Rhythm (1950) and Gang War (1958).) during the 1920s, as well as five Spanish-language films made in Argentina during World War II, notably Back in the Seventies and Fragata Sarmiento.

== Death ==
Grey was found deceased in bed at her mother's home in Los Angeles, California on November 22, 1947, having succumbed to a two-month bout of influenza. She was survived by her husband, magazine editor Ramón Romero, and their daughter. She is interred at the Westwood Village Memorial Park Cemetery in Los Angeles. She is resting by her husband, mother, and daughter.

== Filmography ==
Year	Title	Role	Notes	Ref.
1923	Bag and Baggage	Hope Anthony	Lost film	
1924	A Girl of the Limberlost	Elnora Comstock	Lost film	
1924	The Spirit of the USA	Gretchen Schultz	Incomplete film	
1924	Little Robinson Crusoe	Gretta Schmidt		
1924	Dante's Inferno	Mildred Craig	Incomplete film	
1924	The Millionaire Cowboy	Pauline Truce	Lost film	
1924	The House of Youth	Amy Marsden	Lost film	
1924	The No-Gun Man	Carmen Harroway	Lost film	
1925	The Snob Buster	Molly McGuire	Lost film	
1925	Heartless Husbands	Mary Kayne	Lost film	
1926	The Patent Leather Pug	Billy's Fiancée	Lost film	
1926	The Night Watch	Nellie Powell	Lost film	
1926	Unknown Dangers	Corliss McHenry	Lost film	
1926	The Hidden Way	Mary		
1926	Thrilling Youth	Mary Bryson	Lost film	
1926	Officer Jim	Banker's Daughter	Lost film	
1926	The Ghetto Shamrock		Lost film	
1926	The Boaster	Dick's Intended	Lost film	
1927	The Broncho Buster	Barbara Furth	Lost film	
1927	Range Courage	Betty Martin	Lost film	
1927	Blake of Scotland Yard	Lady Diane Blanton	Lost film	
1927	The Thrill Seekers	Mystery Girl	Lost film	
1927	On Special Duty		Short film Lost film	
1927	Red Warning		Short film Lost film	
1928	The Prince and the Papa		Short film Lost film	
1928	Put 'Em Up	Helen Turner	Lost film	
1928	Winged Hoofs	Madge Weston	Short film Lost film	
1928	The Hound of Silver Creek	Molly White	Lost film	
1928	A Tenderfoot Hero		Short film Lost film	
1928	The Cloud Dodger	Sylvia LeMoyne		
1929	Days of Daring	Ranch Owner	Short film Lost film	
1929	Dodging Danger		Short film Lost film	
1929	Lucky Star	Mary Smith		
1929	Married in Hollywood	Charlotte	Incomplete film	
1940	The Golden Arrow			
1940	Nosotros, los muchachos			
1940	Fragata Sarmiento			
1945	Back in the Seventies		Also known as: Allá en el setenta y tantos	
1946	El tercer huésped			

== Bibliography ==
- Donaldson, Geoffrey (1997). Of joy and sorrow: a filmography of Dutch silent fiction. Stichting Nederlands Filmmuseum. ISBN 9789071338106.
- Ellenberger, Allan R. (2001). Celebrities in Los Angeles Cemeteries: A Directory. McFarland. ISBN 978-0-78640-983-9.
- Katchmer, George A. (2002). A Biographical Dictionary of Silent Film Western Actors and Actresses. McFarland. ISBN 978-0-78644-693-3.
