= Bag and Baggage =

1923 film directed by Finis Fox

- Directed by: Finis Fox
- Written by: Finis Fox; Lois Zellner
- Produced by: Finis Fox
- Starring: Gloria Grey; John Roche; Carmelita Geraghty
- Cinematography: Hal Mohr
- Production company: Finis Fox Corporation
- Distributed by: Selznick Pictures
- Release date: November 24, 1923
- Running time: 6 reels
- Country: United States
- Languages: Silent; English intertitles

Bag and Baggage is a 1923 American silent comedy film directed by Finis Fox and starring Gloria Grey, John Roche and Carmelita Geraghty.

== Cast ==
- Gloria Grey as Hope Anthony
- John Roche as Hal Tracy
- Carmelita Geraghty as Lola Cooper
- Paul Weigel as Philip Anthony
- Adele Farrington as Mrs. Cooper
- Arthur Stuart Hull as Jathrow Billings
- Fred Kelsey as Fred
- Harry Dunkinson as Hotel Detective
- R.D. MacLean as Cyrus Irwin
- Doreen Turner as The Girl
- Ned Grey as The Boy

== Bibliography ==
- Munden, Kenneth White. The American Film Institute Catalog of Motion Pictures Produced in the United States, Part 1. University of California Press, 1997.
