= Should She Obey? =

American 1917 film

Should She Obey? is an American film released in 1917. It was produced by the Arizona Film Company of Chicago. George Siegmann directed and appears in the film. It is considered a lost film.

The plot about a man who becomes successful leading a mining business and his wife has moralistic overtones. A showgirl steals his love.

Barratt O'Hara served as president of Arizona Film Company.

== Cast ==
- George A. Siegmann
- Norbert Myles
- Gene Genung
- J. Webster Dill
- Billie West
- Andrew Arbuckle
- Alice Wilson
- James Harrison
- Robert Lawlor
- Herbert Sutch
- Laura Winston
- Margaret McQuarrie
- Walter C. Howey
