= Dick Winslow =

American actor and musician (1915–1991)

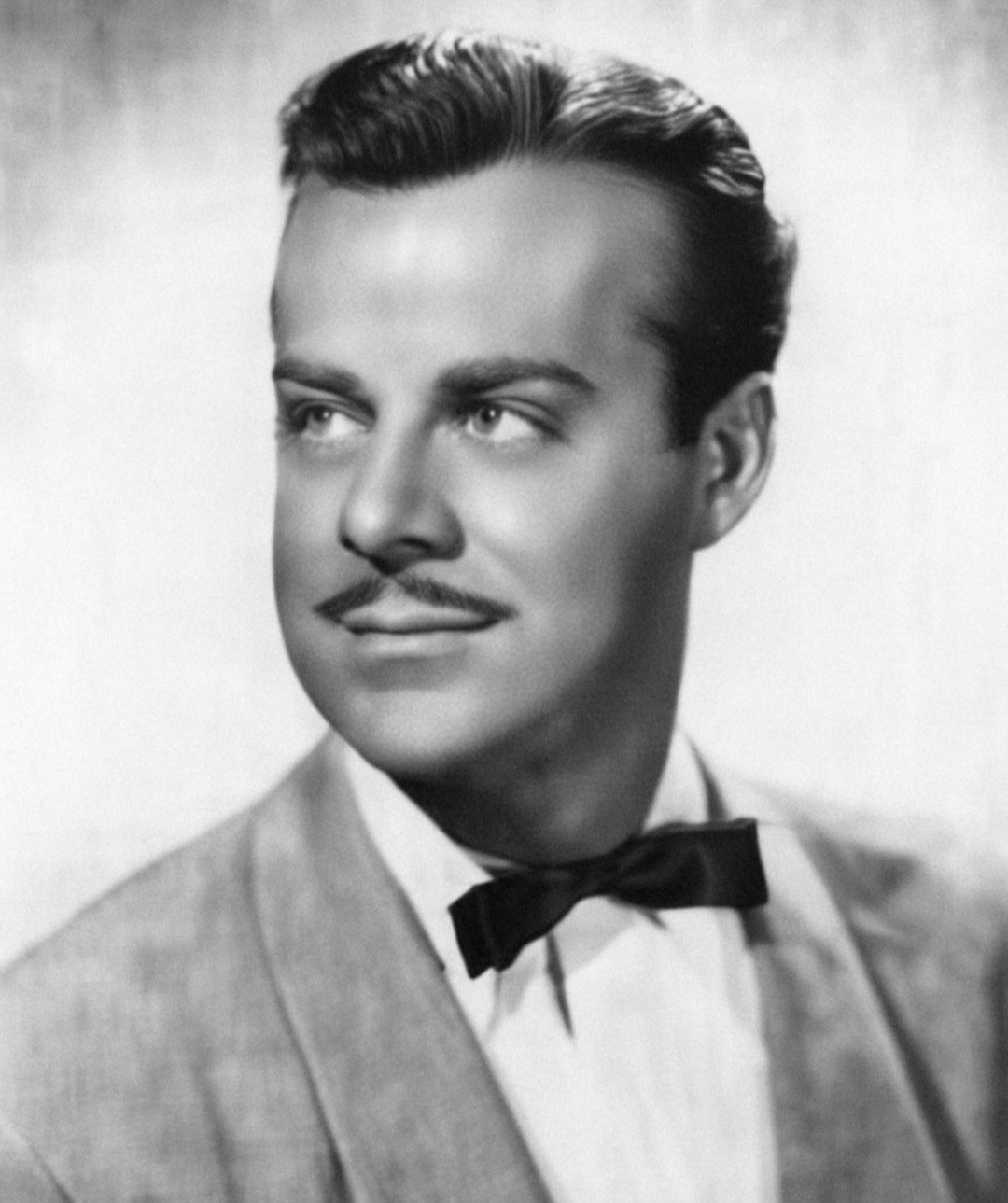
- Winslow in 1950
- Born: Richard Winslow Johnson; March 25, 1915; Jennings, Louisiana, U.S.
- Died: February 7, 1991 (aged 75); North Hollywood, Los Angeles, California, U.S.
- Occupation: Actor
- Years active: 1924–1988
- Spouse: Shirley
- Children: 4

Richard Winslow Johnson (March 25, 1915 – February 7, 1991) was an American actor, musician, and multi-talented performer whose career spanned from child acting in the 1920s through decades of character roles in film and television, as well as extensive work as a live musician and one-man band entertainer.

== Early life ==
Dick Winslow was born in Jennings, Louisiana, in 1915, and was raised in Los Angeles, California. He later attended and graduated from Belmont High School in Los Angeles.

== Career ==
He entered show business at a very young age, appearing in Our Gang comedies during the 1920s and working as a child reporter on a KHJ children’s radio program in 1924.

By the early 1930s, Winslow was already an established juvenile performer in Hollywood.

He appeared in the role of Joe Harper in Tom Sawyer (1930) and played Johnny Carter in the motion picture Seed.

During this period, Winslow became known not only for his screen work but also for his live performances. He frequently appeared at department stores and toy shops throughout Southern California, including Robertson’s Toyland in Hollywood, Walker’s in San Diego, and Harris’ Toy Town in San Bernardino, where he entertained children by sketching portraits and playing the accordion.

He was also closely associated with author Madeline Brandeis and served as the real-life model for the hero of her children’s novel Jack of the Circus. In 1931, Winslow participated in book promotion events alongside Brandeis, sketching young readers and appearing in public autograph sessions.

At the same time, Winslow was developing a parallel career as a musician. He led his own orchestra, performing at Hollywood industry events such as the Actors Costume Ball at the Hollywood Masonic Temple, and provided music for films including Sorority House, Hold That Co-Ed, and Swing, Sister, Swing. He also appeared in Three Smart Girls Grow Up and East Side of Heaven.

As an adult, Winslow became a prolific character actor, appearing in dozens of motion pictures over several decades. His other film credits included roles as Tinkler in Mutiny on the Bounty (1935), composer Gil Rodin in The Benny Goodman Story (1955), Mr. Schultz in Airport (1970), and a streetcar driver in John Wayne’s The Shootist (1976).

He also appeared in numerous television series, including I Love Lucy, The Red Skelton Show, Maude, and Dallas, among others.

In addition to acting, Winslow was a lifelong musician and entertainer. Throughout the 1950s, he worked on a promotional tour for the Hacienda Hotel in Las Vegas, playing piano aboard 1,133 chartered airline flights between Burbank and Las Vegas.

From 1955 until the mid-1970s, he performed periodically at Disneyland as a one-man band entertainer. In 1964, Winslow was selected to portray a one-man band character created by Walt Disney for the premiere of Mary Poppins. After leaving Disneyland in the mid-1970s, he performed at Knott's Berry Farm until 1982, and continued entertaining at private events and in television commercials.

In 1966, Winslow co-wrote the California Angels’ fight song, “A-OK!”, with his wife, contributing a lasting piece of music to the team’s identity.

== Personal life ==
Winslow was married to Shirley Winslow for 31 years. He had four children: sons Rick and Kevin, and daughters Kellie and Judie. He also had two grandchildren.

Winslow resided in Studio City, California later in life.

== Death ==
Dick Winslow died from complications of diabetes at a convalescent hospital in North Hollywood, Los Angeles, California, in February 7, 1991 at age 75.

== Filmography ==
=== Film ===
Year	Title	Role	Notes
1924	Which Shall It Be?	Moore Child	
1926	Trumpin' Trouble	Jimmie Dyson	
1927	Range Courage	Jimmy Blake	
1928	Avalanche	Jack Dunton (age 12)	
1929	Marianne	Teen-age Boy for soldiers' marching song	Uncredited
1929	Love, Live and Laugh	Mike	
1929	The Virginian	Young Boy at square dances	Uncredited
1929	Blaze o' Glory	Boy	Uncredited
1930	Sarah and Son	Servant's Son	Uncredited
1930	Tom Sawyer	Joe Harper	Starring Jackie Coogan; first sound version of Mark Twain novel
1931	Bad Sister	Paper Boy	First film appearance of Bette Davis; Uncredited
1931	Misbehaving Ladies	Minor Role	Uncredited
1931	Seed	Johnny Carter	
1932	Forbidden	Office Boy	Uncredited
1932	The Impatient Maiden	Irish Neighbor's Son	Uncredited
1932	So Big	Roelf, age 12	
1932	Tom Brown of Culver	Cadet	Uncredited
1933	Laughter in Hell	Ed Perkins, as a boy	
1933	The Sweetheart of Sigma Chi	Student	Uncredited
1933	Only Yesterday		Uncredited
1933	Female	First Office Boy	Uncredited
1934	Uncertain Lady	Office Boy	
1934	Harold Teen	Student	Uncredited
1934	Twenty Million Sweethearts	Page Boy	Uncredited
1934	Stingaree	Boy with Package	Uncredited
1934	Bachelor Bait	Lionel Pierpont Wells	Uncredited
1934	The Man with Two Faces	Call Boy	Voice, Uncredited
1934	The Human Side	Phil Sheldon	
1934	One Exciting Adventure	Boy	
1934	There's Always Tomorrow	Dick White	
1934	Flirtation Walk	Cadet	Uncredited
1935	Grand Old Girl	One of Gerry's Friends	Uncredited
1935	The Good Fairy	Messenger	Uncredited
1935	A Night at the Ritz	Messenger	Uncredited
1935	Night Life of the Gods	Student	Uncredited
1935	The Girl from 10th Avenue	College Club Bellboy	Uncredited
1935	Front Page Woman	Copy Boy	Uncredited
1935	Shipmates Forever	Danny, the Accordionist	Uncredited
1935	Mutiny on the Bounty	Tinkler	Starring Clark Gable and Charles Laughton; Oscar winner for Best Picture.
1936	Rose Bowl	Boy	Uncredited
1937	Navy Blue and Gold	Seaman Messenger	Uncredited
1938	Man-Proof	Messenger Boy with Telegram	Uncredited
1938	Test Pilot	Pilot in Cafe	Story of a daredevil test pilot starring Clark Gable and Spencer Tracy; Uncredited
1938	Letter of Introduction	Second Elevator Boy	Uncredited
1938	Hold That Co-ed	State College Band Leader	Uncredited
1939	Persons in Hiding	Page	Uncredited
1939	Sudden Money	Messenger	Uncredited
1939	Good Girls Go to Paris	Student	Uncredited
1939	Winter Carnival	Orchestra Leader	Uncredited
1939	When Tomorrow Comes	Accordion Player	Uncredited
1939	Dancing Co-Ed	Man on Motorcycle	Uncredited
1940	And One Was Beautiful	Boy at Party	Uncredited
1940	Star Dust	Messenger	Uncredited
1940	Those Were the Days!	First Passenger	Uncredited
1940	Manhattan Heartbeat	Bus Driver	
1940	Mystery Sea Raider	Messenger	Uncredited
1940	Love Thy Neighbor	Bellboy	Uncredited
1942	The Bugle Sounds	Recruit	Uncredited
1942	A Tragedy at Midnight	Orchestra Leader	Uncredited
1942	Ten Gentlemen from West Point	Cadet	Uncredited
1942	Orchestra Wives	Musician	Uncredited
1943	Bombardier	Navigator	Uncredited
1943	Salute to the Marines	Young Marine	Uncredited
1943	Swing Shift Maisie	Flyer Lieutenant	Uncredited
1943	Thousands Cheer	Soldier	A WWII-themed all-star M-G-M musical revue designed to boost morale; Uncredited
1943	Is Everybody Happy?	Joe	
1944	Stars on Parade	Dave	Uncredited
1945	Blonde from Brooklyn	Orchestra Leader	Uncredited
1946	Tars and Spars	Orchestra Leader	Uncredited
1946	My Reputation	Orchestra Leader	Uncredited
1946	To Each His Own	Bill McNair	Olivia de Havilland romantic drama for which she won her first Oscar for Best Actress; Uncredited
1946	The Blue Dahlia	Dick, Piano Player at Party	Film noir starring Alan Ladd and Veronica Lake; Uncredited
1946	Easy to Wed	Orchestra Leader	Uncredited
1946	Sing While You Dance	Hep	Uncredited
1946	The Secret Heart	Photographer	Uncredited
1947	Kilroy Was Here	Bandleader	Uncredited
1948	You Were Meant for Me	Drummer, Member of the Band	Uncredited
1948	French Leave	Concertina Player	
1948	On an Island with You	Bald Naval Radio Operator	Uncredited
1950	I'll Get By	Cooky Myers	Uncredited
1952	With a Song in My Heart	Tony Morello, Orchestra Conductor	Susan Hayward stars in a biopic of crippled singer Jane Froman; Uncredited
1952	Washington Story	Orchestra Leader	Uncredited
1952	Because of You	Hartman	Uncredited
1953	Scared Stiff	Nightclub Patron	Martin & Lewis comedy; uncredited
1953	A Slight Case of Larceny	Customer	Uncredited
1953	Half a Hero	Orchestra Leader / Emcee	Uncredited
1953	Torch Song	Party Guest	Uncredited
1954	The Atomic Kid	Second Sergeant	Uncredited
1954	They Rode West	Soldier, Ocarina Player	Uncredited
1955	Jail Busters	Dr. Wade	Uncredited
1955	The Twinkle in God's Eye	Poker Player	Uncredited
1956	The Benny Goodman Story	Gil Rodin	Biopic of musician Benny Goodman starring Steve Allen and Donna Reed
1956	Francis in the Haunted House	Sergeant Arnold	A "Francis the Talking Mule" comedy starring Mickey Rooney
1958	King Creole	Eddie Burton	An Elvis Presley musical drama
1960	Platinum High School	Eddie	Uncredited
1960	All the Fine Young Cannibals	Orchestra Leader	Uncredited
1960	The Rat Race	Tip, Member of The Red Peppers	Uncredited
1960	G.I. Blues	Orchestra Leader	An Elvis Presley musical comedy; uncredited
1961	Ada	Reporter	Uncredited
1961	Everything's Ducky	Fröehlich	
1961	The Continental Twist	M. Dubois	
1962	Gypsy	Burlesque House Orchestra Leader	Adaptation of Broadway musical; Uncredited
1963	Bye Bye Birdie	Leader of Fireman's Band	Adaptation of Broadway musical; Uncredited
1964	The Carpetbaggers	Reporter	Uncredited
1965	The Cincinnati Kid	Second Player	Uncredited
1965	Do Not Disturb	One-Man Band	A comedy starring Doris Day and Rod Taylor
1966	Frankie and Johnny	Orchestra Leader	Uncredited
1966	Three on a Couch	Ship's Officer	A Jerry Lewis comedy; Uncredited
1966	Nevada Smith	Prisoner	Uncredited
1966	Follow Me, Boys!	Musician	Uncredited
1966	The Swinger	Photographer	Uncredited
1967	Riot on Sunset Strip	Curtis	
1967	Divorce American Style	Card Player	Uncredited
1967	The Love-Ins	Policeman	Uncredited
1967	The Fastest Guitar Alive	Man in Street	Uncredited
1968	Never a Dull Moment	Second TV Actor	Uncredited
1968	Funny Girl	Violinist at Keeney's	Uncredited
1968	The Wrecking Crew	Tram Operator	Uncredited
1969	The Comic	Organist	Uncredited
1970	Airport	Mr. Schultz	
1971	Doctors' Wives	Manuel, the Bartender	Uncredited
1971	The Love Machine	Producer	Uncredited
1971	The Brady Bunch	Winters	The Teeter Totter Caper
1973	The Devil and LeRoy Bassett	Charlie Zornes	
1975	Lepke	Piano Player	
1975	Funny Lady	Fritz	Sequel to Funny Girl (1968) starring Barbra Streisand
1975	The Apple Dumpling Gang	Slippery Sid	A Walt Disney family comedy with Tim Conway and Don Knotts
1975	The Other Side of the Mountain	Man in Car	
1976	Embryo	John Forbes	
1976	Treasure of Matecumbe	Townsman at Medicine Show	Uncredited
1976	The Shootist	Streetcar Driver	John Wayne western; his final film role.
1976	Two-Minute Warning	Man with Toupee	
1976	Freaky Friday	Man in Pool	Walt Disney family film with a young Jodie Foster; Uncredited
1978	Movie Movie	Reporter / Tinkle Johnson	(segment "Dynamite Hands") / (segment "Baxter's Beauties of 1933)
1979	Americathon	Act	
1980	Midnight Madness	Tourist	
1981	First Monday in October	Court Barber	

=== Television ===
Year	Title	Role	Notes
1959	One Step Beyond	Harry	Season 2 Episode 15: "The Hand"
1960	Alfred Hitchcock Presents	Club Member	Season 6 Episode 8: "O Youth and Beauty!" (uncredited)
1961	Rawhide	Townsman	Season 3 Episode 21: "Incident of His Brother's Keeper"
1963	My Three Sons	Policeman	Season 3 Episode 39: "Found Money"
1964	The Andy Griffith Show	Band Leader	Season 4 Episode 27: "Fun Girls"
