= Range Courage =

1927 film

- Directed by: Ernst Laemmle
- Written by: Gene Markey (story); Robert F. Hill
- Produced by: Carl Laemmle
- Starring: Fred Humes; Gloria Grey; Dick Winslow
- Cinematography: Alan Jones
- Production company: Universal Pictures
- Distributed by: Universal Pictures
- Release date: July 24, 1927
- Running time: 50 minutes
- Country: United States
- Languages: Silent; English intertitles

Range Courage is a 1927 American silent Western film directed by Ernst Laemmle and starring Fred Humes, Gloria Grey and Dick Winslow.

== Cast ==
- Fred Humes as Lem Gallagher
- Gloria Grey as Betty Martin
- Dick Winslow as Jimmy Blake
- William Steele as Tex Lucas
- Robert Homans as Pop Gallagher
- Arthur Millett as John Martin
- Monte Montague as Bart Allan
- Charles King as Red Murphy
- Morgan Brown as Sheriff

== Bibliography ==
- Connelly, Robert B. The Silents: Silent Feature Films, 1910-36, Volume 40, Issue 2. December Press, 1998.
- Langman, Larry. A Guide to Silent Westerns. Greenwood Publishing Group, 1992.
- Munden, Kenneth White. The American Film Institute Catalog of Motion Pictures Produced in the United States, Part 1. University of California Press, 1997.
