= Louis Simon (comedian) =

American vaudeville comedian

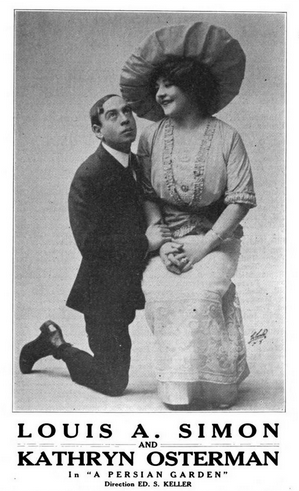
Louis A. Simon and Kathryn Osterman in "A Persian Garden", from a 1912 publication.

Louis Simon was a vaudeville comedian. He performed an act called The New Coachman with Grace Gardner for years. Their raucous show caused some controversy. Pierrot Film Company was established in 1914 to make Simon's films.

The Index called his act one of the funniest on stage. Simon made many short films in 1914 and 1915.

Simon organized the Vaudeville Comedy Club to advocate for performers.

He also performed with Kathryn Osterman. George LeMaire partnered with him in five comedy film shorts before LeMaire reunited with Joe Phillips. Their film The Plumbers are Coming is about a pair of bungling burglars. A short clip of it was rediscovered and restored.

== Filmography ==
- Percy, the Milliner (1914)
- Love Finds a Way (1914), as The Bachelor
- Cousin Billy (1914), as Billy
- At the Dentist's (1929)
- Go Easy, Doctor (1929)
- Her New Chauffeur (1929)
- The Plumbers are Coming (1929)
- What a Day (1929)
- Go Easy Doctor (1929)
- A Shocking Affair (1931)
- Hot Shivers (1931)
