= The Seventh Commandment (1932 film) =

1932 film

- Directed by: Dwain Esper; James P. Hogan
- Written by: Hildegarde Stadie; Dwain Esper
- Produced by: Dwain Esper
- Starring: Victoria Vinton; George LeMaire; James Harrison
- Production company: Roadshow Attractions
- Distributed by: Roadshow Attractions
- Release date: October 15, 1932
- Running time: 65 minutes
- Country: United States
- Language: English

The Seventh Commandment is a 1932 American Pre-Code crime film directed by Dwain Esper and James P. Hogan and starring Victoria Vinton, George LeMaire and James Harrison. It was produced on Poverty Row as a second feature. The title refers to the Seventh Commandment "Thou shalt not commit adultery". It is now considered a lost film.

== Plot ==
A young man from the country heads to a big city in order to make his fortune. However he soon falls in with bad company, taking part in games of strip poker and promiscuous activities. Disgusted by such a life he returns to his hometown and plans to marry his childhood sweetheart Mary, but is alarmed to discover he has caught syphilis.

== Cast ==
- Stuart James as David Hayes
- Victoria Vinton as Mary Townley
- George LeMaire as Cubby
- James Harrison as Numbskull
- Maxine Collins as Vi
- Virginia Griffith as Sue
- Martha Heath as Fanny
- Alma Powell as Ma Townley
- William Malan a s Pa Townley
- Frank Schwab as Gloomy
- Edward Carlie as The Doctor
- Horace B. Carpenter as The Quack Doctor
- E. Alyn Warren as The Philosopher

== Bibliography ==
- Pitts, Michael R. Poverty Row Studios, 1929–1940. McFarland & Company, 2005.
