= College Days (1926 film) =

1926 film

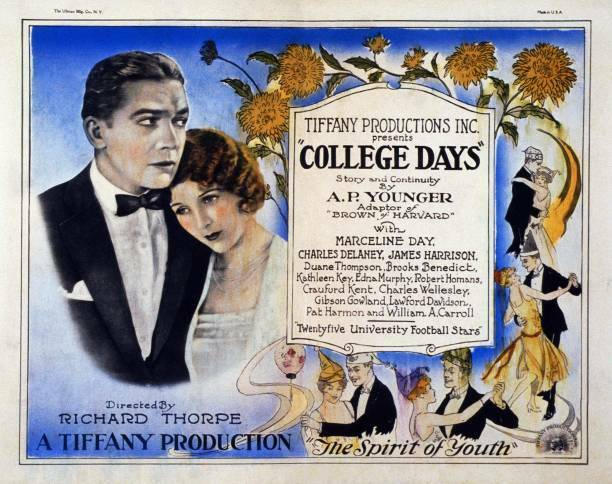
- Lobby card
- Directed by: Richard Thorpe
- Written by: Andrew Percival Younger
- Produced by: Andrew Percival Younger
- Starring: Marceline Day; Charles Delaney; James Harrison
- Cinematography: Milton Moore; Mack Stengler
- Edited by: James C. McKay
- Production company: Tiffany Pictures
- Distributed by: Tiffany Pictures
- Release date: October 15, 1926
- Running time: 80 minutes
- Country: United States
- Language: Silent (English intertitles)

College Days is a 1926 American silent romantic comedy film directed by Richard Thorpe and starring Marceline Day, Charles Delaney, and James Harrison. It was produced by the independent Tiffany Pictures. The film's sets were designed by the art director Edwin B. Willis.

== Synopsis ==
On his first day at the University of California, Jim Gordon meets and falls in love with Mary Ward but also makes an enemy in Kenneth Slade. Mary's feelings are hurt when she sees Jim with another woman, and his attempts to make amends almost get him expelled. At the last moment he is called back to take part in a football game, winning both it and the heart of Mary.

== Cast ==
- Marceline Day as Mary Ward
- Charles Delaney as Jim Gordon
- James Harrison as Larry Powell
- Duane Thompson as Phyllis
- Brooks Benedict as Kenneth Slade
- Kathleen Key as Louise
- Edna Murphy as Bessie
- Robert Homans as Mr. Gordon
- Crauford Kent as Kent
- Charles Wellesley as Bryson
- Gibson Gowland as Carter
- Lawford Davidson as Professor Maynard
- Pat Harmon as Coach
- William A. Carroll as Dean

== Bibliography ==
- Connelly, Robert B. The Silents: Silent Feature Films, 1910-36, Volume 40, Issue 2. December Press, 1998.
- Munden, Kenneth White. The American Film Institute Catalog of Motion Pictures Produced in the United States, Part 1. University of California Press, 1997.
- Oriard, Michael. King Football: Sport and Spectacle in the Golden Age of Radio and Newsreels, Movies and Magazines, the Weekly and the Daily Press. University of North Carolina Press, 2005.
- Umphlett, Wiley Lee . The Movies Go to College: Hollywood and the World of the College-Life Film. Fairleigh Dickinson University Press, 1984.
