= Captain Lash =

1929 film

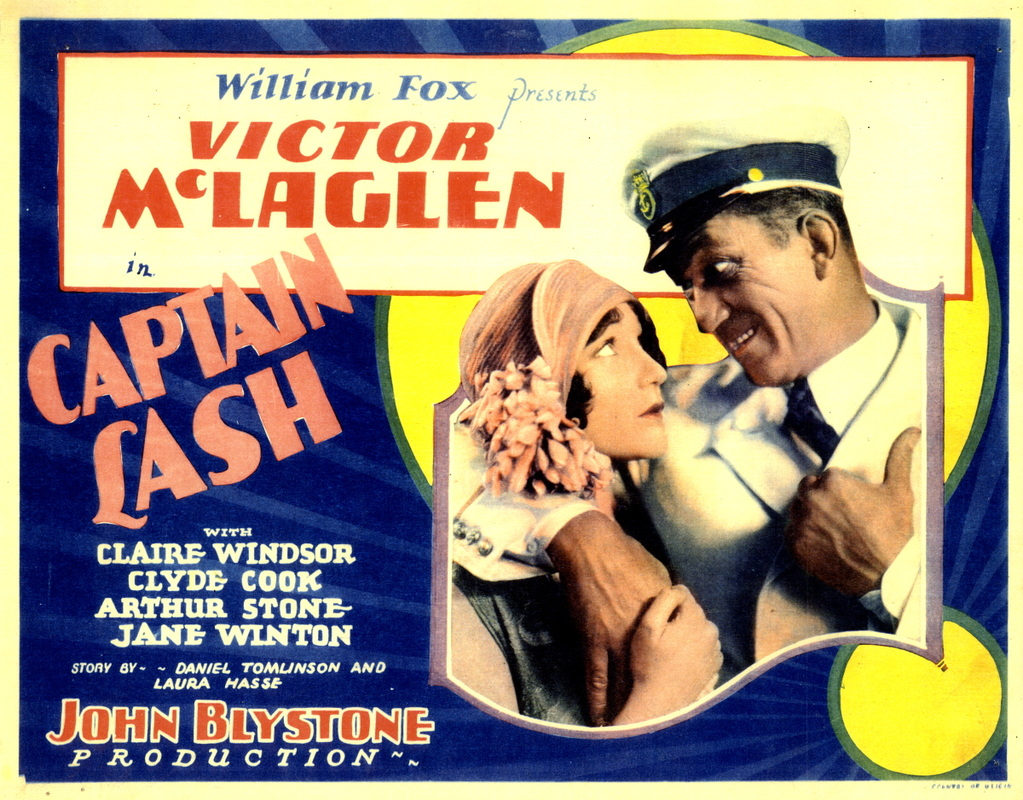
- Directed by: John G. Blystone
- Written by: Andrew Bennison; Malcolm Stuart Boylan; John Stone; Daniel G. Tomlinson
- Produced by: William Fox
- Starring: Victor McLaglen; Claire Windsor; Jane Winton
- Cinematography: Conrad Wells
- Edited by: James Kevin McGuinness
- Production company: Fox Film Corporation
- Distributed by: Fox Film Corporation
- Release date: January 6, 1929
- Running time: 60 minutes
- Country: United States
- Languages: Sound (Synchronized); English intertitles

Captain Lash is a 1929 American Synchronized sound adventure drama film directed by John G. Blystone and starring Victor McLaglen, Claire Windsor and Jane Winton. While the film has no audible dialog, it was released with a synchronized musical score with sound effects using both the sound-on-disc and sound-on-film process. It was produced and distributed by the Fox Film Corporation. A copy of the film exists at UCLA. The film was released with a music score and sound effects track.

== Plot ==
The film begins in a raucous South American waterfront bar. Captain Lash, a burly and boisterous stoker who commands the respect of his fire-room crew with fists and a whip, drinks and brawls alongside his wiry sidekick, Cocky. Cocky is the comic opposite of Lash—small, sharp-tongued, and forever trying to keep his giant friend from falling into trouble with women. A fight with longshoremen spills into the street; the pair narrowly escape and rush back to their ocean liner, due to sail for Singapore.

As they stumble aboard, they nearly collide with a fine automobile unloading a new passenger: Cora Nevins, a poised blonde with society manners—and secret criminal ties. Lash is instantly struck by her glamour.

When the ship departs, passengers are given a tour of the stokehold. Among them is Cora, resplendent even in the infernal heat. Lash demonstrates his dominance over the sweating stokers, but also reveals a surprising streak of fairness when he takes up a shovel himself to relieve an exhausted Malay worker. Suddenly, the crazed stoker snaps, flinging open a steam valve. Boiling vapor floods the room. Lash pulls Cora to safety, shielding her with his body, and suffers severe burns.

Convalescing in the sick bay, Lash receives visits from Cora. To him, she appears an angel of mercy. In truth, she and her confederates—Gentleman Eddie and others—are plotting to rob wealthy passenger Alex Condrax, who carries a famous collection of jewels.

Cora stages a flirtation with Condrax, gaining his confidence and access to his jewel case. With the aid of her accomplices, she steals several valuable stones. But smuggling them past customs at Singapore poses a problem. She persuades the smitten Lash to carry the envelope ashore for her, claiming she needs his protection. The stoker, hopelessly infatuated, agrees.

Unbeknownst to Lash, Cocky suspects foul play. Ever loyal, though irreverent, Cocky intercepts the packet and replaces the contents with lumps of coal.

When Lash dutifully delivers the envelope to Cora at her residence, he discovers the substitution. Furious, Cora lashes out at him, sneering that he is nothing but a gullible brute. Realizing at last that she is a crook, Lash explodes in anger. At that moment, her henchmen leap from the shadows to attack. A brutal fight erupts, with Lash flattening the lot of them.

Cocky arrives, concertina in hand, and signals with his trademark warning tune, “The Campbells Are Coming,” a gag recurring throughout the film whenever a jealous husband or danger approaches. His suspicions vindicated, he produces the real jewels, which he has safeguarded.

The police raid the hideout, arresting Cora and her confederates. Lash, though bruised in pride and body, hands the jewels back to Condrax with rough humility. The “angel” he idolized is revealed as a scheming thief, and his romantic illusions vanish.

In the end, Lash shrugs off heartbreak with his usual rough resilience. His affections return to his steadfast waterfront sweetheart Babe (Jane Winton), who has waited for him in Singapore. Cocky, ever the loyal watchdog, squeezes out another sour tune on his concertina as if to remind Lash not to stray again.

The film closes on the two stokers side by side, one hulking and sentimental, the other wiry and mocking, as they head back into the noisy, coal-dusted life that defines them.

== Cast ==
- Victor McLaglen as Captain Lash
- Claire Windsor as Cora Nevins
- Jane Winton as Babe
- Clyde Cook as Cocky
- Arthur Stone as Gentleman Eddie
- Albert Conti as Alex Condrax
- Jean Laverty as Queen
- Frank Hagney as Bull Hawks
- Boris Charsky as Condax's servant
- Marcelle Corday as Mrs. Koenig

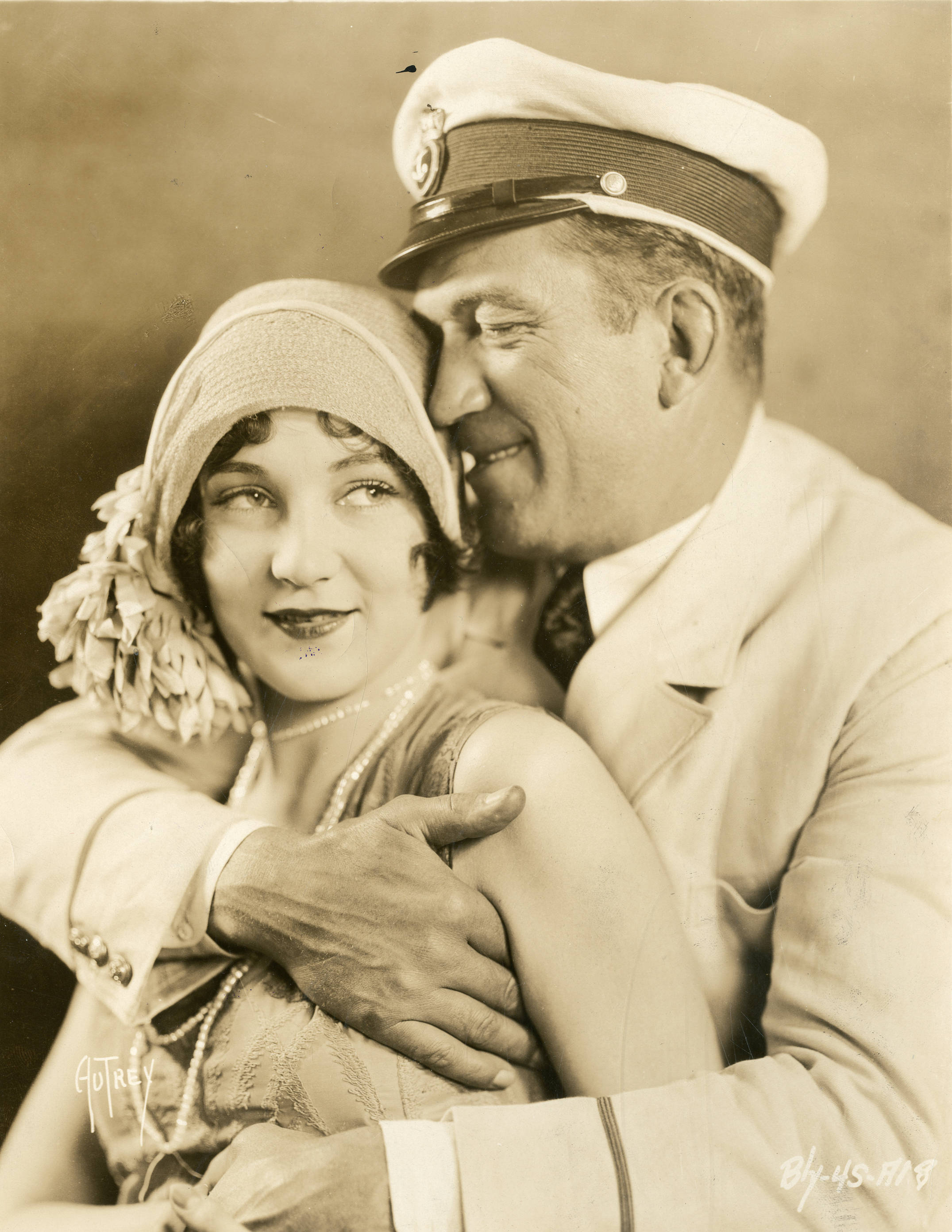
McLaglen and Windsor

== Music ==
The musical score featured in the film was composed by Hugo Riesenfeld. S. L. Rothafel directed the recording session.

== See also ==
- List of early sound feature films (1926–1929)
