= Burning Gold =

Burning Gold may refer to:

- Burning Gold (1927 film)
- Burning Gold (1936 film)
- "Burning Gold" (song), a 2014 song by Christina Perri
