= Marie Quillan =

American actress

- Born: Mary Ann Quillan; March 17, 1909; Philadelphia, Pennsylvania, USA
- Died: April 16, 1998 (aged 89); Sun Valley, California, USA
- Relatives: Eddie Quillan (brother)

Marie Quillan (March 17, 1909 – April 16, 1998) was an American actress who was active in Hollywood during the 1920s and 1930s. She was known primarily for her work on B-movie Westerns.

== Biography ==
Quillan was born in Philadelphia, Pennsylvania, to Sarah Owens and Joseph Quillan, both of whom were performers born in Scotland. Actor Eddie Quillan was her brother, and she had nine other siblings.

By the late 1920s, the Quillan family had resettled in Los Angeles, where she and several of her brothers and sisters performed with in vaudeville shows. She studied at the Bud Murray School for Stage and Screen. Quillan's first known film credit was 1929's Noisy Neighbors.

Little is known of her life after her appearance in 1935's The Singing Vagabond.

== Selected filmography ==
- Noisy Neighbors (1929)
- Campus Knights (1929)
- The Cheyenne Cyclone (1931)
- The Hurricane Horseman (1931)
- The Saddle Buster (1932)
- The Singing Vagabond (1935)
- Melody Trail (1935)
- Alias Mary Dow (1935)
