= Chip of the Flying U (1939 film) =

1939 film

- Directed by: Ralph Staub
- Screenplay by: Larry Rhine; Andrew Bennison
- Based on: Chip of the Flying U by Bertha Muzzy Sinclair
- Produced by: Albert Ray
- Starring: Johnny Mack Brown
- Cinematography: William A. Sickner
- Edited by: Louis Sackin
- Music by: Charles Previn
- Distributed by: Universal Pictures
- Release date: November 29, 1939
- Running time: 55 minutes
- Country: United States
- Language: English
- Budget: $40,000

Chip of the Flying U is a 1939 American Western film directed by Ralph Staub and starring Johnny Mack Brown. It was produced and distributed by Universal Pictures and is a remake of their 1926 silent epic of the same name starring Hoot Gibson.

== Cast ==
- Johnny Mack Brown as 'Chip' Bennett
- Bob Baker as 'Dusty'
- Fuzzy Knight as 'Weary'
- Doris Weston as Margaret Whitmore
- Forrest Taylor as J.G. Whitmore
- Anthony Warde as Ed Duncan
- Karl Hackett as Hennessy
- Henry Hall as Banker Wilson
- Claire Whitney as Miss Robinson
- Ferris Taylor as Sheriff
- Cecil Kellogg as Red
- The Texas Rangers as Musicians
