= The Enemy (1927 film) =

1927 film

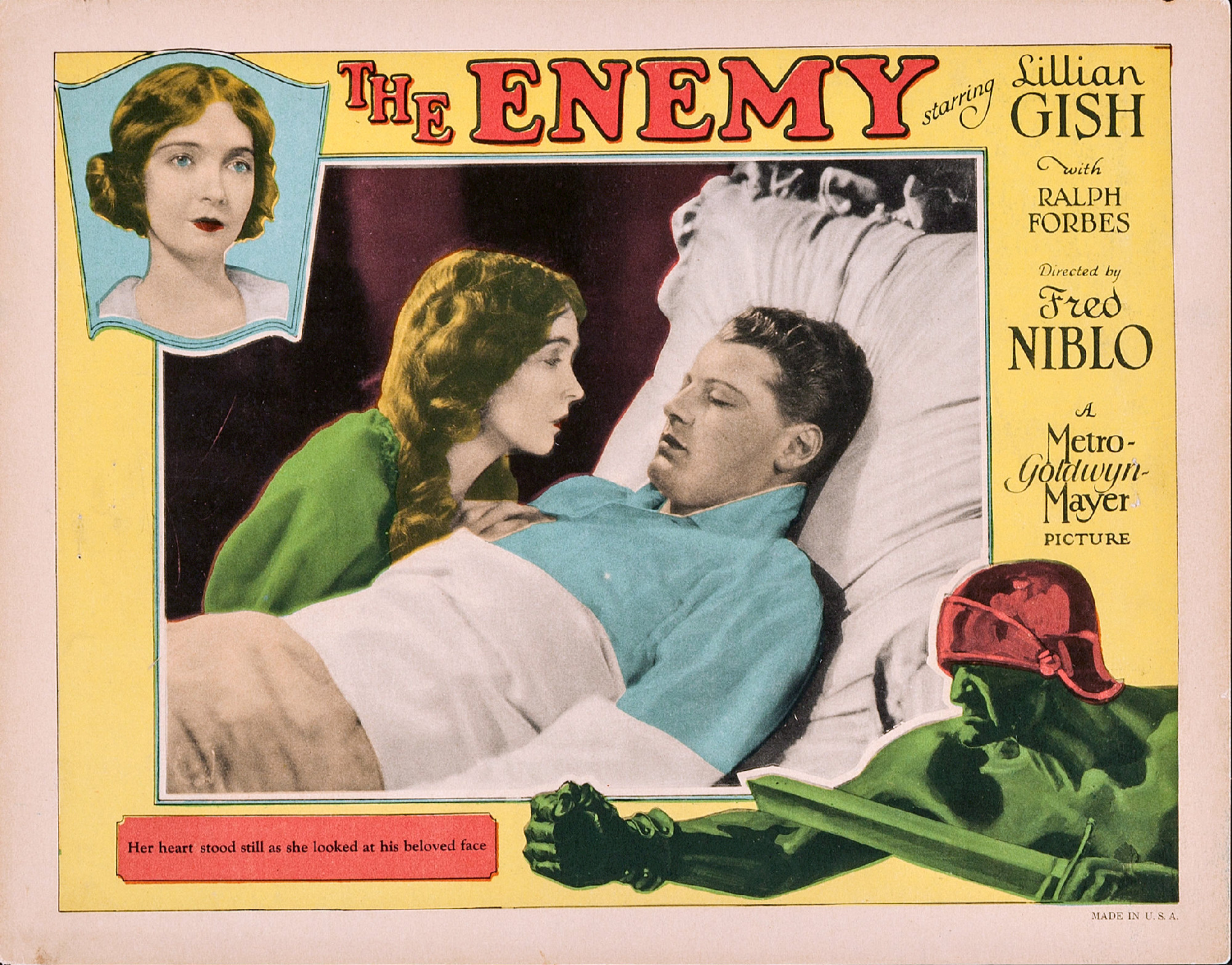
- Lobby card
- Directed by: Fred Niblo
- Screenplay by: John Colton; Willis Goldbeck; Agnes Christine Johnston; Channing Pollock
- Starring: Lillian Gish; Ralph Forbes; Ralph Emerson
- Cinematography: Oliver T. Marsh
- Edited by: Margaret Booth
- Production company: Metro-Goldwyn-Mayer
- Distributed by: Metro-Goldwyn-Mayer
- Release date: December 8, 1927
- Running time: 90 minutes
- Country: United States
- Language: Silent (English intertitles)

The Enemy is a 1927 American silent drama film directed by Fred Niblo and starring Lillian Gish, Ralph Forbes and Ralph Emerson. Actor Joel McCrea made an early appearance as an extra.

== Plot ==
Newlywed Carl goes to war where he endures major suffering. Back home, wife Pauli starves, becomes a prostitute to survive, and their baby dies.

== Cast ==
- Lillian Gish as Pauli Arndt
- Ralph Forbes as Carl Behrend
- Ralph Emerson as Bruce Gordon
- Frank Currier as Professor Arndt
- George Fawcett as August Behrend
- Fritzi Ridgeway as Mitzi Winkelmann
- Hans Joby as Fritz Winkelmann (credited as John S. Peters)
- Karl Dane as Jan
- Polly Moran as Baruska
- Billy Kent Schaefer as Kurt
- Louise Emmons (uncredited)
- Betty Jane Graham as Little girl (uncredited)
- William Wilbur Steel as Pauli Arndt’s baby boy Carl Behrend Jr.(uncredited)
- Joel McCrea as Extra (uncredited)

== Censorship concern ==
The Motion Picture Producers and Distributors of America, formed by the film industry in 1922, regulated the content of films through a list of subjects that were to be avoided. While Lillian Gish portrayed a prostitute in The Enemy, this was acceptable as prostitution was not explicitly barred so long as it was not forced (i.e., white slavery) and aspects of her work were not shown in the film.

== Preservation ==
The Enemy was thought to have been lost for years until a copy was discovered at the MGM library, now owned by Turner Entertainment. However, the film is still missing its final reel.

== See also ==
- List of American films of 1927
- Lillian Gish filmography
- List of incomplete or partially lost films
