= William Burress =

American actor (1867–1948)

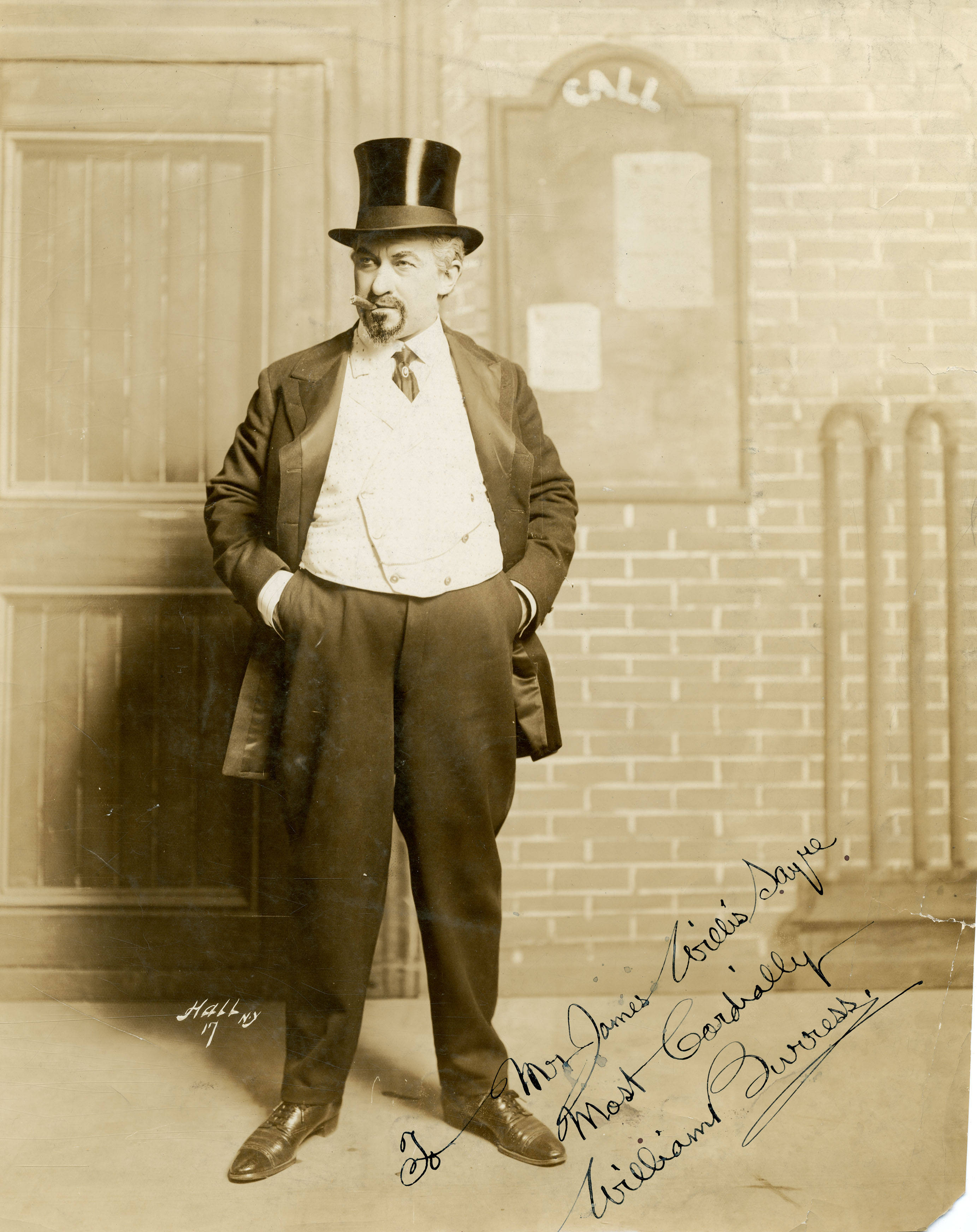
- Burress in 1913
- Born: 19 August 1867; Newcomerstown, Ohio, United States
- Died: 30 October 1948 (aged 81); Los Angeles, USA
- Occupation: Actor
- Years active: 1915–1939

William Burress (19 August 1867 – 30 October 1948) was an American actor. He appeared in fifteen Broadway productions from 1900 to 1920, and more than seventy films from 1915 to 1939.

== Filmography ==
Year	Title	Role	Notes
1915	A Bunch of Keys	Littleton Snaggs	
1916	A Man of Sorrow	Kridge	
1916	The Battle of Hearts	Captain Sprague	
1916	The Man from Bitter Roots	Toy	
1916	The End of the Trail	Father Le Jeune	
1916	The Fires of Conscience	Randolf Sneed	
1917	The Island of Desire	Tuan Yuck	
1917	The Book Agent	Crandall Barker	
1917	The Spy	Freiheer Von Wittzchaeft	
1917	The Soul of Satan	Alden Lee	
1917	The Scarlet Pimpernel	Chauvelin	
1918	A Soul for Sale	Hale Faxon	
1918	Kultur	The Kaiser	
1918	The Rainbow Trail	Waggoner	
1919	The Forbidden Room	Lawyer	
1919	Heartsease	Peter Padbury	
1919	Paid in Advance	Regan	
1919	Lord and Lady Algy	Brabazon Tudway	
1921	The Great Impersonation	Dr. Hugo Schmidt	
1922	The Girl Who Ran Wild	Johnny Cake	
1927	Yours to Command	Pa O'Brien	
1927	Fluttering Hearts	Father	Short
1931	Five and Ten	Man in Hospital Waiting Room	Uncredited
1931	Blonde Crazy	Col. Bellock	
1931	The Guilty Generation	Charlie - City Editor	Uncredited
1931	Local Boy Makes Good	Colonel Small	
1932	Lovers Courageous	Jan Coetzee - Tobacconist	Uncredited
1932	Scarface	Judge	(alternate ending), Uncredited
1932	Scandal for Sale	Judge	Uncredited
1932	The Famous Ferguson Case	Dad Sipes	
1932	The Strange Love of Molly Louvain	Policeman	Uncredited
1932	Street of Women	Doctor	Uncredited
1932	Love Is a Racket	Ollie	(scenes deleted)
1932	You Said a Mouthful	Roger Colby	Uncredited
1932	They Just Had to Get Married	Bradford	
1932	Rasputin and the Empress	Minor Role	Uncredited
1933	Pilgrimage	Mr. Goldstein	Uncredited
1933	Turn Back the Clock	Mr. Cradwell	Uncredited
1933	Broadway Through a Keyhole	Thomas Barnum	
1933	The World Changes	Mr. Krauss, a Banker	
1933	Convention City	Customer	
1934	Bedside	Oscar Bernstein	Uncredited
1934	Fashions of 1934	Feldman	
1934	The Show-Off	Andrew Barnabas	Uncredited
1934	The Girl from Missouri	Mr. Freddie Hay	Uncredited
1934	Jane Eyre	Minister	
1934	One Night of Love	Mr. Barrett - Mary's Father	Uncredited
1934	The Richest Girl in the World	Haley's Editor	Uncredited
1934	Babes in Toyland	The Toy Maker	Uncredited
1935	The County Chairman		Uncredited
1935	Grand Old Girl	Butts	
1935	The Little Colonel	Dr. Scott	
1935	Naughty Marietta	Petshop Keeper	Uncredited
1935	Life Begins at 40	Abercrombie's Friend	Uncredited
1935	The Big Broadcast of 1936	Musician	Uncredited
1935	Dr. Socrates	George S. Harris - Grocery Proprietor	Uncredited
1936	The Story of Louis Pasteur	Doctor François	Uncredited
1936	I'd Give My Life		Uncredited
1936	After the Thin Man	Cousin Lucius	Uncredited
1937	We Who Are About to Die	Charlie Gaunt - Cashier	Uncredited
1937	Racketeers in Exile	Thornton	
1937	Shall We Dance	New Jersey Justice of the Peace	Uncredited
1937	Mountain Music	Hillbilly	Uncredited
1937	You Can't Beat Love	Mr. Maxwell	Uncredited
1937	Wild Money	Spreckett	
1937	She Asked for It	Coroner	Uncredited
1937	Hot Water	Clerk	Uncredited
1937	Partners in Crime	Policeman	Uncredited
1938	There's Always a Woman	Rent Collector	Uncredited
1939	Never Say Die	Man with Dog	Uncredited, (final film role)
