= The Cheer Leader =

1928 film

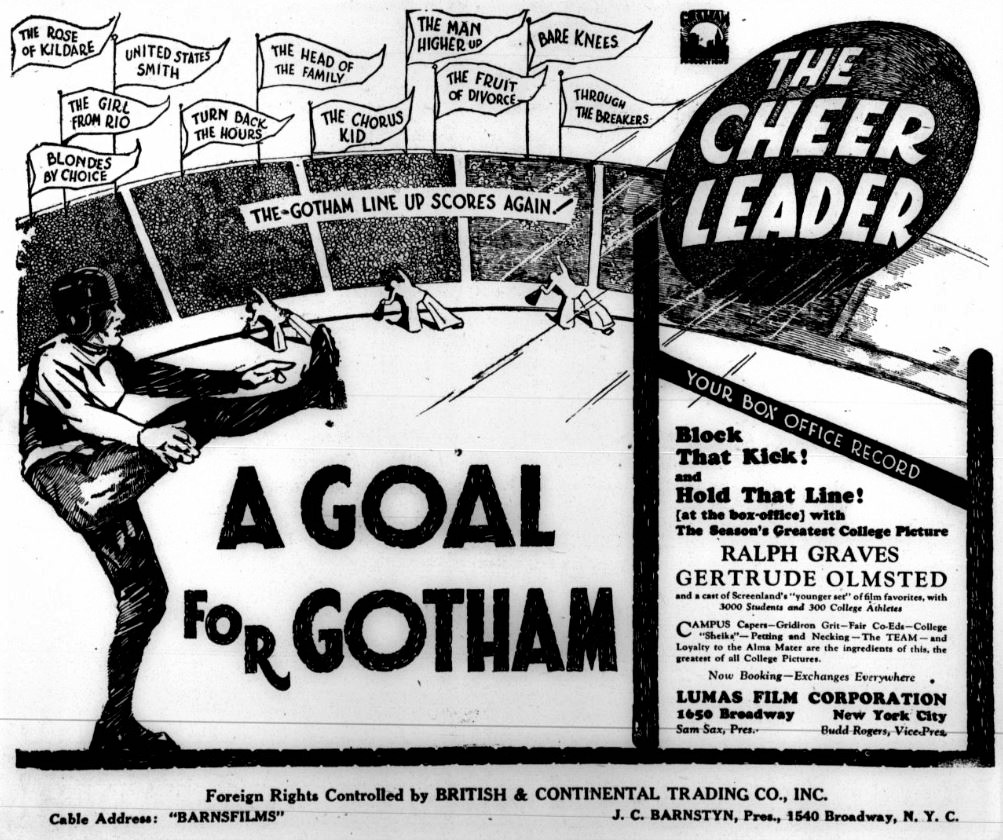
- Advertisement
- Directed by: Alan James
- Written by: Lee Authmar; Jack Casey; Dudley Early
- Starring: Ralph Graves; Gertrude Olmstead; Shirley Palmer
- Cinematography: Edward Gheller
- Edited by: Edith Wakeling
- Production company: Gotham Productions
- Distributed by: Lumas Film Corporation
- Release date: January 1, 1928
- Running time: 60 minutes
- Country: United States
- Language: Silent (English intertitles)

The Cheer Leader is a 1928 American silent drama film directed by Alan James and starring Ralph Graves, Gertrude Olmstead, and Shirley Palmer.

== Cast ==
- Ralph Graves as Jimmy Grant
- Gertrude Olmstead as Jean Howard
- Shirley Palmer as Elizabeth Summers
- Ralph Emerson as Alfred Crandall
- Harold Goodwin as Richard Crosby
- Donald Stuart as Percival Spivins
- Duke Martin as Chuck Casey
- Harry Northrup as John Crandall
- Ruth Cherrington as Mrs. Crandall
- James Leonard as James Grant Sr
- Lillian Langdon as Mrs. Grant
- Bobby Nelson as Chester Grant
- Charles North as Dean Sherwood

== Preservation ==
A print of The Cheer Leader is held by the Library of Congress.

== Bibliography ==
- Wiley Lee Umphlett. The Movies Go to College: Hollywood and the World of the College-Life Film. Fairleigh Dickinson Univ Press, 1984.
