= Bachelor's Paradise (1928 film) =

1928 film

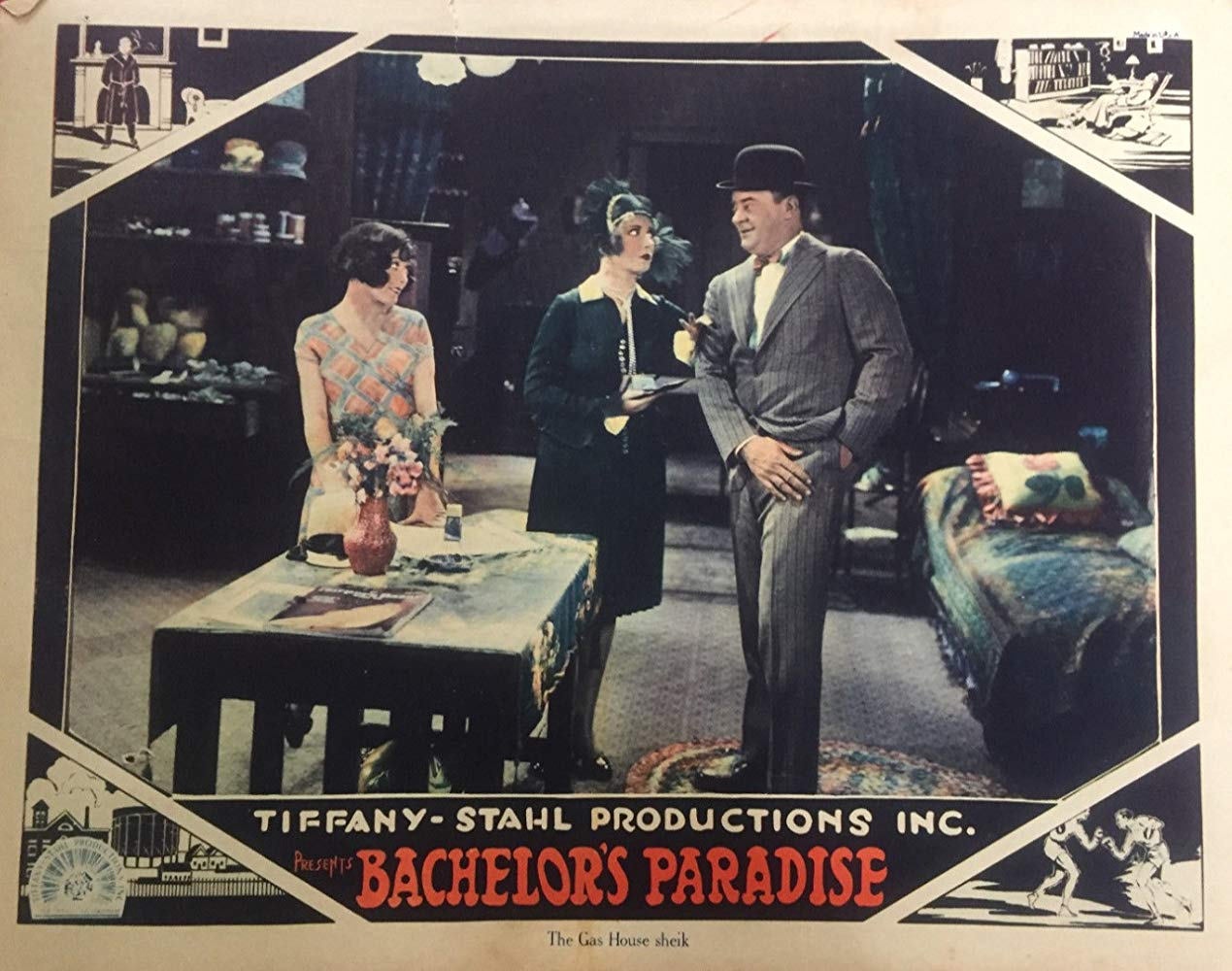
- Lobby card
- Directed by: George Archainbaud
- Written by: Curtis Benton; Harry Braxton; Vera Clark; Frances Guihan
- Produced by: John M. Stahl
- Starring: Sally O'Neil; Ralph Graves; Eddie Gribbon
- Cinematography: Chester A. Lyons
- Edited by: Robert Kern
- Production company: Tiffany-Stahl Productions
- Distributed by: Tiffany Pictures
- Release date: March 15, 1928
- Running time: 70 minutes
- Country: United States
- Language: Silent (English intertitles)

Bachelor's Paradise is a 1928 American silent drama film directed by George Archainbaud and starring Sally O'Neil, Ralph Graves, and Eddie Gribbon.

== Cast ==
- Sally O'Neil as Sally O'Day
- Ralph Graves as Joe Wallace
- Eddie Gribbon as Terry Malone
- James Finlayson as Pat Malone
- Sylvia Ashton as Mrs. Malone
- Jean Laverty as Gladys O'Toole

== Preservation ==
With no prints of Bachelor's Paradise located in any film archives, it is a lost film.

== Bibliography ==
- Munden, Kenneth White. The American Film Institute Catalog of Motion Pictures Produced in the United States, Part 1. University of California Press, 1997.
