= Charles Grayson (writer) =

American screenwriter (1903–1973)

- Born: August 15, 1903; Los Angeles, California, U.S.
- Died: May 4, 1973 (aged 69); Los Angeles, California, U.S.
- Education: University of California at Los Angeles
- Occupation: Screenwriter
- Years active: 1936–1958
- Spouse: Paddy Yeatts Grayson

Charles Grayson (August 15, 1903 – May 4, 1973) was an American screenwriter. He worked on around forty films between 1936 and 1958. He worked under contract for Warner Brothers for a number of years. Although uncredited in the film final, along with Robert Buckner he was instrumental in reviving the operetta film The Desert Song (1943) by proposing an updated version of an old studio hit.

== Background ==
Charles Grayson, originally born Charles Wright Gray, was called out west to Hollywood in the early 1930s to collaborate with P. J. Wolfson and Allen Rivkin, writing scripts during the Golden Era of Hollywood. Grayson graduated from UCLA in 1926 with a degree in English and was an active member of Kaps and Bells, a drama organization, where he also served as chairman of the literature committee. His father was Lucien D. C. Gray, and he had two sisters, including one named Evelyn.

Early in his career, he published several anthologies under his birth name before adopting the surname “Grayson,” reportedly because he believed “Gray” was “too bland” (Pickle). Grayson traveled widely and furthered his education at Harvard University and the Sorbonne in Paris, where he was encouraged to pursue writing by literary figures such as F. Scott Fitzgerald, Michael Arlen, and Reskine Gwynne.

== Contributions ==
In Allen Rivkin’s Hello Hollywood, Grayson contributed an account of his experience working with director John Huston, with whom he shared a mutual passion for adapting literature into film. During World War II, both men served in Italy under the direction of Frank Capra, filming wartime action for the U.S. Army. After the war, Grayson briefly married Daye Eliot (born Evelyn Crowell), though their marriage ended by 1946 or early 1947. Frequently mentioned in Hollywood gossip columns, he was known to have dated several actresses, including Audrey Totter. Under his pseudonym, Charles Grayson, he published four books of fiction, began his writing career as a contributor to Esquire magazine, and went on to write seven novels and edit six story anthologies.

== Selected filmography ==
- Crash Donovan (1936)
- Breezing Home (1937)
- The Man Who Cried Wolf (1937)
- We Have Our Moments (1937)
- You're a Sweetheart (1937)
- Reckless Living (1938)
- Swing, Sister, Swing (1938)
- Tomorrow at Midnight (1939)
- Hawaiian Nights (1939)
- One Night in the Tropics (1940)
- The Boys from Syracuse (1940)
- Thieves Fall Out (1941)
- Bad Men of Missouri (1941)
- Law of the Tropics (1941)
- Underground (1941)
- Wild Bill Hickok Rides (1942)
- The Noose Hangs High (1948)
- Outpost in Morocco (1949)
- Red Light (1949)
- The Woman on Pier 13 (1949)
- Thunder Across the Pacific (1951)
- Battle Hymn (1957)
- The Barbarian and the Geisha (1958)

== Bibliography ==
- Dick, Bernard F. The Star-spangled Screen: The American World War II Film. University Press of Kentucky, 1996.
