= Jean Laverty =

American actress

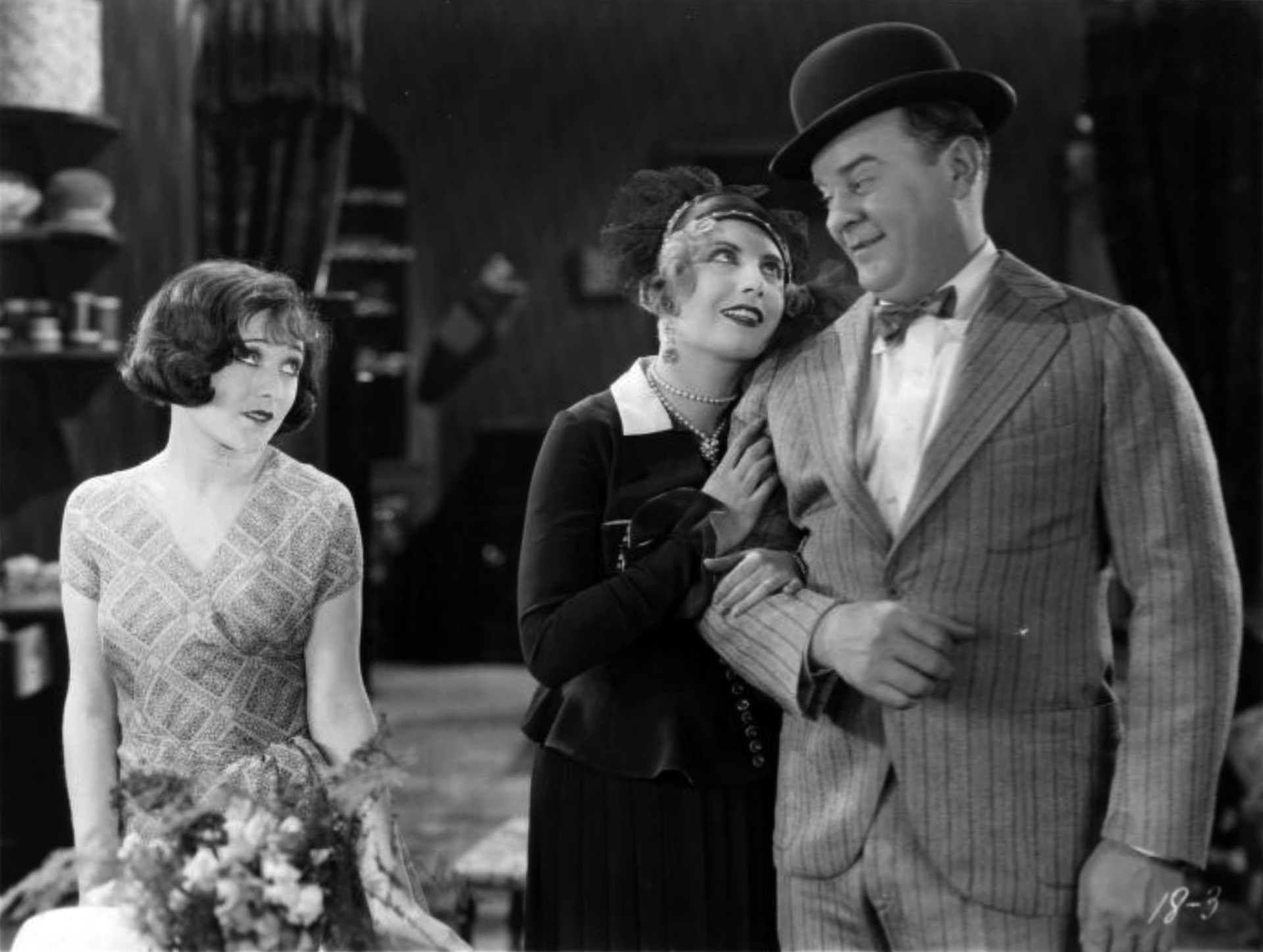
- Laverty (center) with Sally O'Neil and Eddie Gribbon in Bachelor's Paradise
- Born: Gladys Louise Laverty; 3 April 1904; Blue Lake, California, USA
- Died: 28 September 1973 (aged 69); Pismo Beach, California, USA
- Occupation: Actress
- Spouse: William V. Muir

Jean Laverty (born Gladys Laverty, and also known as Jean Bary) was an American actress active in Hollywood in the 1920s and 1930s.

== Biography ==
=== Early life ===
Jean was born in Blue Lake, California, to Henry Laverty and Helen Douarin. While growing up in the small village in Humboldt County, she found herself drawn to the theater. She acted in her high school's plays and was said to have caused an argument between students and faculty by posing for glamorous flapper-style photographs in the school's student newspaper. When she was 18, she was persuaded by a visiting woman stage director to run away from home and pursue a career as an actress.

=== Hollywood career ===
She eventually found work as a model and broke out as an actress on the Orpheum vaudeville circuit. When the act arrived in Los Angeles, Jean decided to stay and try her hand in the movies. She spent her early years toiling in bit parts in comedies at Fox; then, in 1929, in a bid to amp up her career, she started going by Jean Bary, reportedly guided by a suggestion by a numerologist. Soon after the name change, she was cast in a big role in Raoul Walsh's 1929 film The Cock-Eyed World. Her last known role was in 1936's After the Thin Man.

=== Personal life ===
In 1938, she filed a lawsuit against film editor William Hamilton, charging that he had promised to marry her in December 1936 and then changed his mind nearly two years later. She eventually married William V. Muir.

== Selected filmography ==
- 1936 After the Thin Man
- 1936 Florida Special
- 1935 Diamond Jim
- 1933 Strictly Personal
- 1932 The Famous Ferguson Case
- 1931 June Moon
- 1930 Mothers Cry
- 1930 Scarlet Pages
- 1930 Bright Lights
- 1930 Lilies of the Field
- 1929 The Great Divide
- 1929 Why Leave Home?
- 1929 The Cock-Eyed World
- 1929 Prisoners
- 1929 Campus Knights
- 1929 Fugitives
- 1929 Captain Lash
- 1928 The Fleet's In
- 1928 The Goodbye Kiss
- 1928 Bachelor's Paradise
- 1928 So This Is Love?
