= The Albany Night Boat =

1928 silent drama film

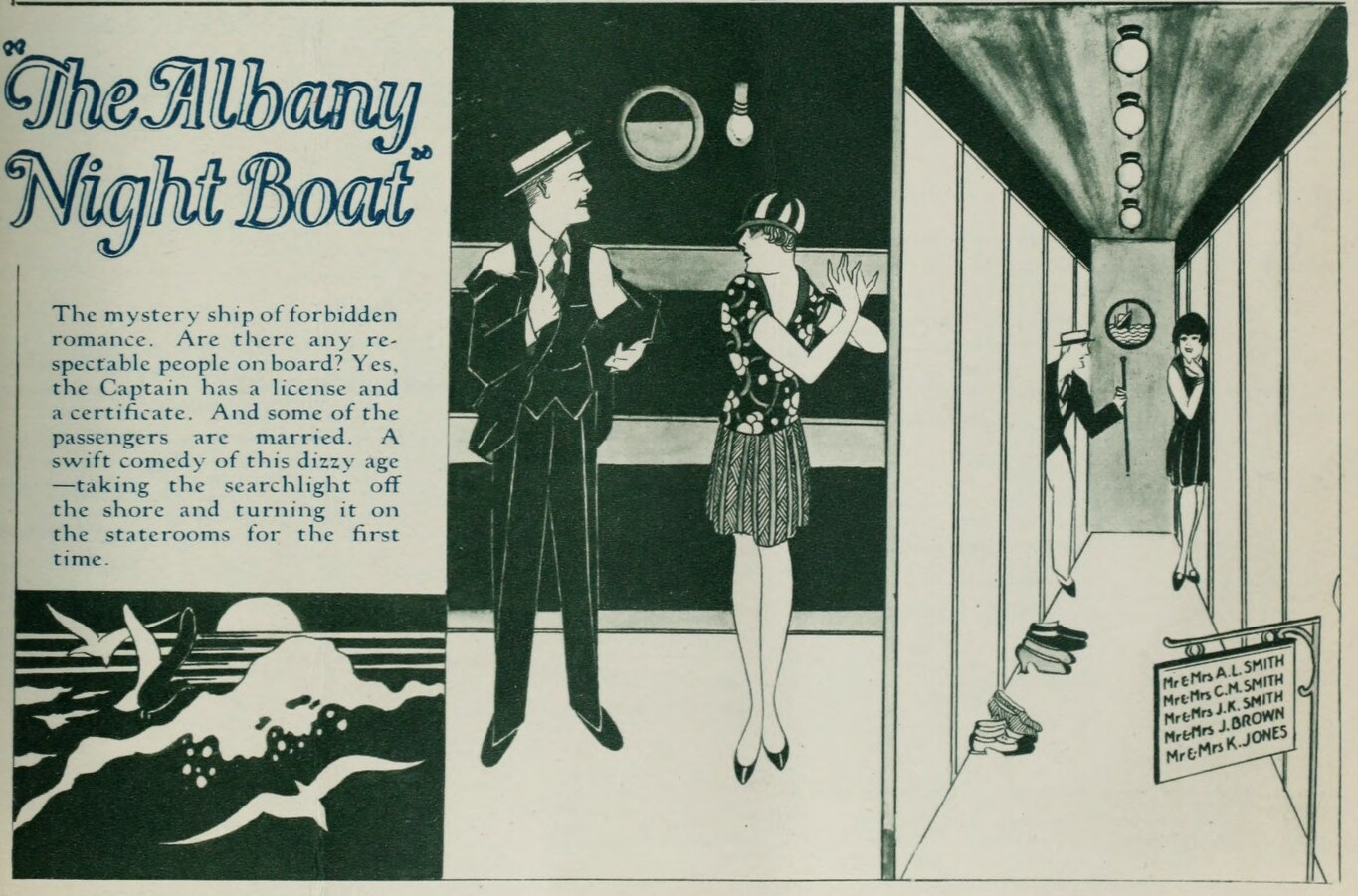
- Advertisement
- Directed by: Alfred Raboch
- Written by: Frederic Hatton; Al Martin; Wellyn Totman
- Starring: Olive Borden; Ralph Emerson; Duke Martin
- Cinematography: Ernest Miller
- Edited by: Byron Robinson
- Production company: Tiffany-Stahl Pictures
- Distributed by: Tiffany-Stahl Pictures
- Release date: July 20, 1928
- Running time: 64 minutes
- Country: United States
- Language: Silent (English intertitles)

The Albany Night Boat is a 1928 American silent drama film directed by Alfred Raboch and starring Olive Borden, Ralph Emerson, and Duke Martin. It was produced and distributed by the independent Tiffany Pictures, one of the largest companies outside the major studios.

== Synopsis ==
Ken, the searchlight operator on the night boat to Albany rescues Georgie from drowning in the Hudson River after she jumps off a yacht. The two get married but their happiness is threatened by Ken's colleague Steve who attempts to seduce her.

== Cast ==
- Olive Borden as Georgie
- Ralph Emerson as Ken
- Duke Martin as Steve
- Nellie Bryden as Morth Crary
- Helen Marlowe as The Blonde

== Bibliography ==
- Connelly, Robert B. The Silents: Silent Feature Films, 1910-36, Volume 40, Issue 2. December Press, 1998.
- Munden, Kenneth White. The American Film Institute Catalog of Motion Pictures Produced in the United States, Part 1. University of California Press, 1997.
