= Eagle of the Night =

1928 American film by James F. Fulton

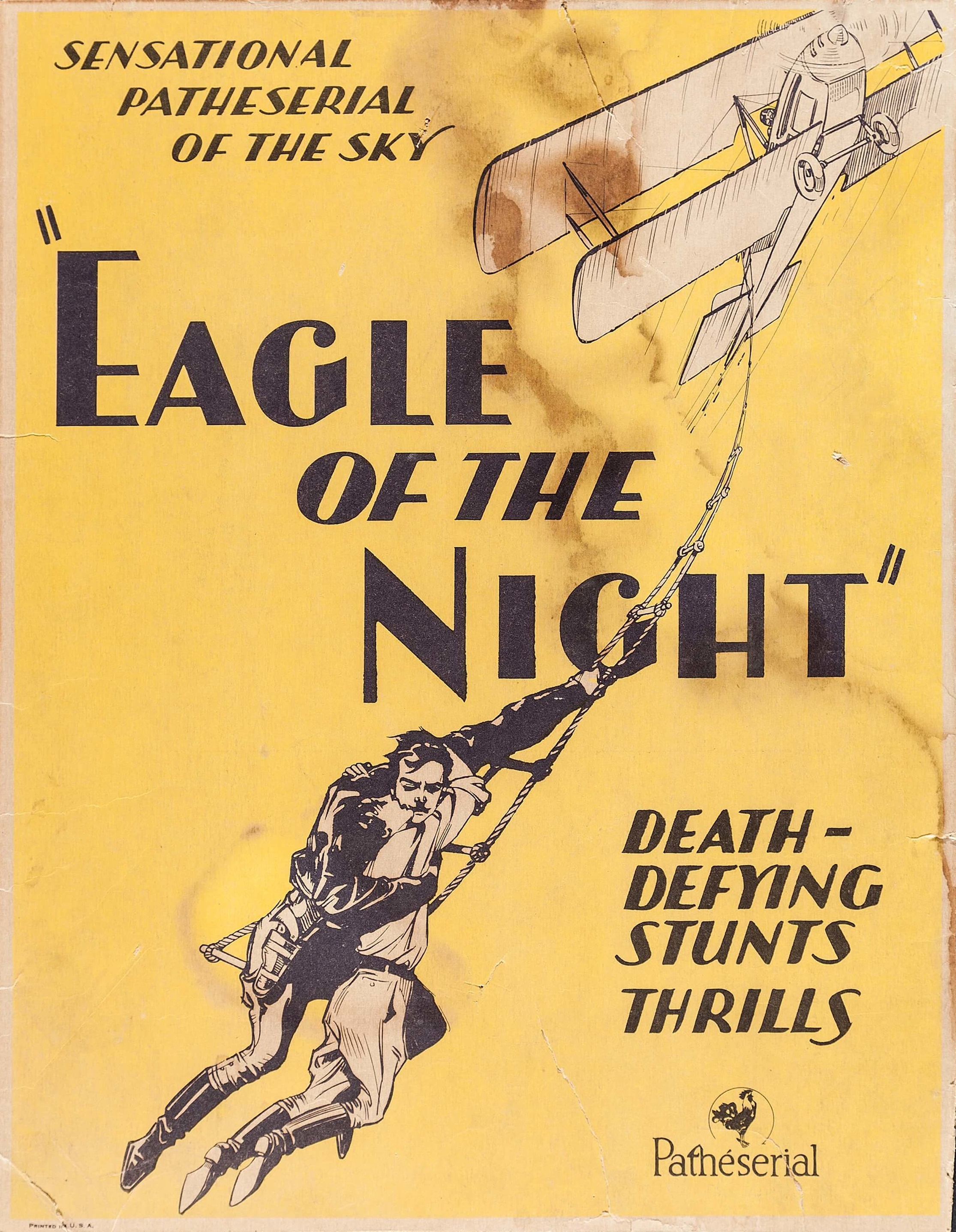
- Film poster
- Directed by: James F. Fulton
- Written by: Paul A. Cruger (as Paul Cruger)
- Starring: Frank Clarke; Shirley Palmer
- Production company: Pathé Studios
- Distributed by: Pathé Exchange
- Release date: October 14, 1928
- Running time: 10 episodes
- Country: United States
- Languages: Silent film English intertitles

Eagle of the Night is a 1928 American drama film serial directed by James F. Fulton. Dismissed when released and completely forgotten in the modern era, the 10-chapter aviation serial starred real-life aviator Frank Clarke, a stunt pilot in such fare as Wings (1927), Hell's Angel (1930), and The Flying Deuces (1939).

Eagle of the Night was one of the last silent film serials produced by Pathé Studios. The entire serial is not known to exist, with half of chapters 3 and 6, all of 7, 8, and 9, and the beginning of the 10th and final chapter considered lost. The surviving footage as available via Grapevine Video, of Eagle of the Night runs about 1 hour and 50 minutes.

== Plot ==
Unscrupulous smugglers are attempting to steal the "Magic Muffler," a device that can make an aircraft practically silent. Flying at night would make the smugglers and their forays across the border, impossible to detect.

The smugglers led by rancher Paul Murdock (Earl Metcalfe), capture the inventor, Professor Payson (Josef Swickard), holding him hostage until they get the secrets to his invention. Unable to get Payson to make another device, the gang then kidnaps Professor Payson's daughter (Shirley Palmer) to force her father to work for them. Even faced with torture, she refuses to help the smugglers.

Secret Service Agent Frank Boyd (Frank Clarke) is called in to confront Murdock and his gang. With the Professor and his daughter on a speeding train, Frank manages to land his Curtiss "Jenny" aircraft on a flat car of the moving train, in time to effect a rescue and win the girl in the end.

== Chapters ==
- 1. "Snatched Into Space"
- 3. "Trapped in the Flames"
- 4. "Dead Wings"
- 5. "The Brink of Eternity"
- 6. "The Fangs of the Wolf"
- 7. "The Sky Hitcher"
- 8. "The March of Death"
- 9. "Headlong to Earth"
- 10. "No Man's Land"

== Cast ==
- Frank Clarke as Secret Service Agent Frank Boyd
- Shirley Palmer as Miss Payson
- Earl Metcalfe as Paul Murdock
- Josef Swickard as Professor Payson
- Maurice Costello
- Max Hawley
- Roy Wilson
- Jack Richardson

== Production ==
Aviation historian and author Don Dwiggins observed that the "Undisputed king of the Hollywood stunt pilots when Mantz arrived was Frank Clarke, a tall, handsome, part-Indian ex-cowboy who melted the hearts of women and froze the hearts of men. A 'born' pilot, Clarke was hopping passengers at Venice Field in 1918 on the same day he soloed. His good looks won him the lead role in the flying film serial Eagle of the Night (1928) at Pathé Studios." (Note: Clarke and Mantz remained bitter Hollywood rivals throughout their careers.)

"In addition, Clarke insisted on writing his own scripts, calling for such suicidal stunts as landing on top of a speeding passenger train. He came closer to disaster on this one, when a wheel stuck between two cars; it came free when the train rounded a curve."

Principal photography on Eagle of the Night took place over Baja California with Clarke and his friend, Roy Wilson, doing all the aerial stunts. (Note: Roy Wilson not only flew in Eagle of the Night, but also had a minor, supporting role in the serial.) The aerial sequences in the serial included many of Clarke's most famous stunts.

== Reception ==
Aviation film historian James Farmer in Celluloid Wings: The Impact of Movies on Aviation (1984) considered Eagle of the Night, a "... vehicle for Clarke's aerial stunting which lacked any real aerial appeal."

== See also ==
- List of American films of 1928
- List of film serials
- List of film serials by studio
