= Lotus Lady =

1930 film by Phil Rosen

- Directed by: Phil Rosen
- Written by: Harry Sinclair Drago
- Starring: Fern Andra; Ralph Emerson; Betty Francisco
- Cinematography: M.A. Anderson
- Edited by: Carl Himm
- Production company: Audible Pictures
- Distributed by: Greiver Productions
- Release date: October 31, 1930
- Country: United States
- Language: English

Lotus Lady is a 1930 American drama film directed by Phil Rosen and starring Fern Andra, Ralph Emerson and Betty Francisco.

== Cast ==
- Fern Andra as Tamarah
- Ralph Emerson as Larry Kelland
- Betty Francisco as Claire Winton
- Lucien Prival as Castro
- Frank Leigh as Brent
- Edward Cecil as George Kelland
- Junior Pironne as Laddie
- James B. Leong as Li
- Joyzelle Joyner as The Dancer

== Bibliography ==
- Palmer, Scott. British Film Actors' Credits, 1895-1987. McFarland, 1988.
