= Ladies Must Play =

1930 film

- Directed by: Raymond Cannon
- Written by: Dorothy Howell
- Produced by: Harry Cohn
- Starring: Dorothy Sebastian; Neil Hamilton; Natalie Moorhead
- Cinematography: Joseph Walker
- Edited by: Gene Milford
- Production company: Columbia Pictures Corporation
- Distributed by: Columbia Pictures
- Release date: August 1, 1930
- Running time: 64 minutes
- Country: United States
- Language: English

Ladies Must Play is a 1930 pre-Code comedy film starring Dorothy Sebastian and Neil Hamilton directed by Raymond Cannon.

== Plot ==
Tony, a popular but bankrupt New York socialite, sends his stenographer to Newport to find and marry a millionaire, but she owes her boss a 10% commission.

== Cast ==
- Dorothy Sebastian as Norma Blake
- Neil Hamilton as Anthony 'Tony' Gregg
- Natalie Moorhead as Connie Tremaine
- John Holland as Geoffrey West
- Harry Stubbs as Stormfield 'Stormy' Buttons
- Shirley Palmer as Marie
- Pauline Neff as Mrs. Wheeler
