= The Fleet's In (1928 film) =

1928 film by Malcolm St. Clair

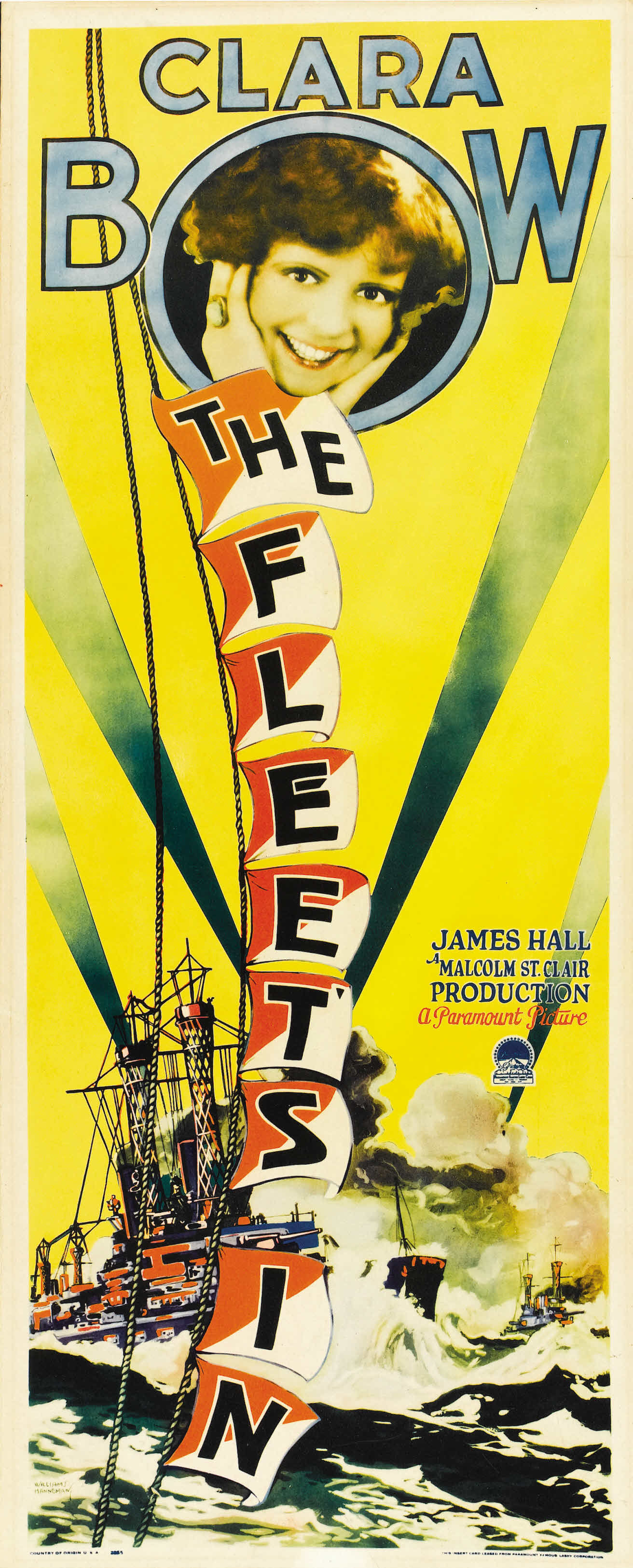
- Poster for film
- Directed by: Malcolm St. Clair
- Screenplay by: Monte Brice; George Marion Jr. J. Walter Ruben
- Produced by: Jesse L. Lasky; Adolph Zukor
- Starring: Clara Bow; James Hall; Jack Oakie; Bodil Rosing; Eddie Dunn; Jean Laverty
- Cinematography: Harry Fischbeck
- Edited by: B. F. Zeidman
- Production company: Paramount Pictures
- Distributed by: Paramount Pictures
- Release date: September 15, 1928
- Running time: 80 minutes
- Country: United States
- Language: Silent (English intertitles)

The Fleet's In is a 1928 American silent comedy film directed by Malcolm St. Clair and written by Monte Brice, George Marion Jr., and J. Walter Ruben. The film stars Clara Bow, James Hall, Jack Oakie, Bodil Rosing, Eddie Dunn, and Jean Laverty. The film was released on September 15, 1928, by Paramount Pictures.

== Plot ==
Trixie “Peachy" Dearie is a “taxi-dancer”, and a 10 cent-per-dance entertainer at a San Francisco amusement park that services sailors. Trixie retains her innocence despite her vocation. She prefers would-be swain “Searchlight” Doyle over his rival Eddie Briggs, who tries to seduce her.

During a power failure the lights go out at the hall and are accidentally paired in a dance contest. The rival Doyle and Eddie fight, and Eddie is put in jail. Peachy, the object of the dispute, blames herself and defends Eddie before the magistrate. Eddie is set free and sails with his ship, pledging himself to Peachy and promising he will remain faithful in all the worldwide ports he visits.

== Cast ==
- Clara Bow as Trixie Deane
- James Hall as Eddie Briggs
- Jack Oakie as Searchlight Doyle
- Bodil Rosing as Mrs. Deane
- Eddie Dunn as Al Pearce
- Jean Laverty as Betty
- Dan Wolheim as Double Duty Duffy
- Richard Carle as Judge Hartley
- Joseph W. Girard as Commandant

== Reception ==
New York Times critic Mordaunt Hall panned the film as merely a vehicle “written for the purpose of giving Miss Bow an opportunity to smile and cry.” He adds that the scenario “makes about as much impression on one's mind as a colored comic strip.” Reportedly, the vaudeville stage show was more impressive than the film, performed by “an expert Russian dancer, who has a ready wit and a keen ear for music. His show is one of the best entertainments of its type that has been seen at the Paramount for some time.”

== Survival status ==
The Fleet's In is presumed to be a lost film.
