= Prowlers of the Sea =

1928 film

- Directed by: John G. Adolfi
- Written by: Jack London (story); Jack Natteford; Leslie Mason
- Produced by: Roy Fitzroy; John M. Stahl
- Starring: Carmel Myers; Ricardo Cortez; George Fawcett
- Cinematography: Desmond O'Brien
- Edited by: Ernest Miller
- Production company: Tiffany Pictures
- Distributed by: Tiffany Pictures
- Release date: June 20, 1928
- Running time: 60 minutes
- Country: United States
- Languages: Silent; English intertitles

Prowlers of the Sea is a 1928 American silent adventure film directed by John G. Adolfi and starring Carmel Myers, Ricardo Cortez and George Fawcett. It is based on Jack London's story The Siege of the Lancashire Queen.

== Cast ==
- Carmel Myers as Mercedes
- Ricardo Cortez as Carlos De Neve
- George Fawcett as General Hernández
- Gino Corrado as The Skipper
- Frank Lackteen as Ramón Sánchez
- Frank Leigh as Felipe
- Shirley Palmer as Cuban Maid

== Bibliography ==
- Dan Van Neste. The Magnificent Heel: The Life and Films of Ricardo Cortez. BearManor Media, 2017.
