= Ralph Emerson (actor) =

American actor (1899–1984)

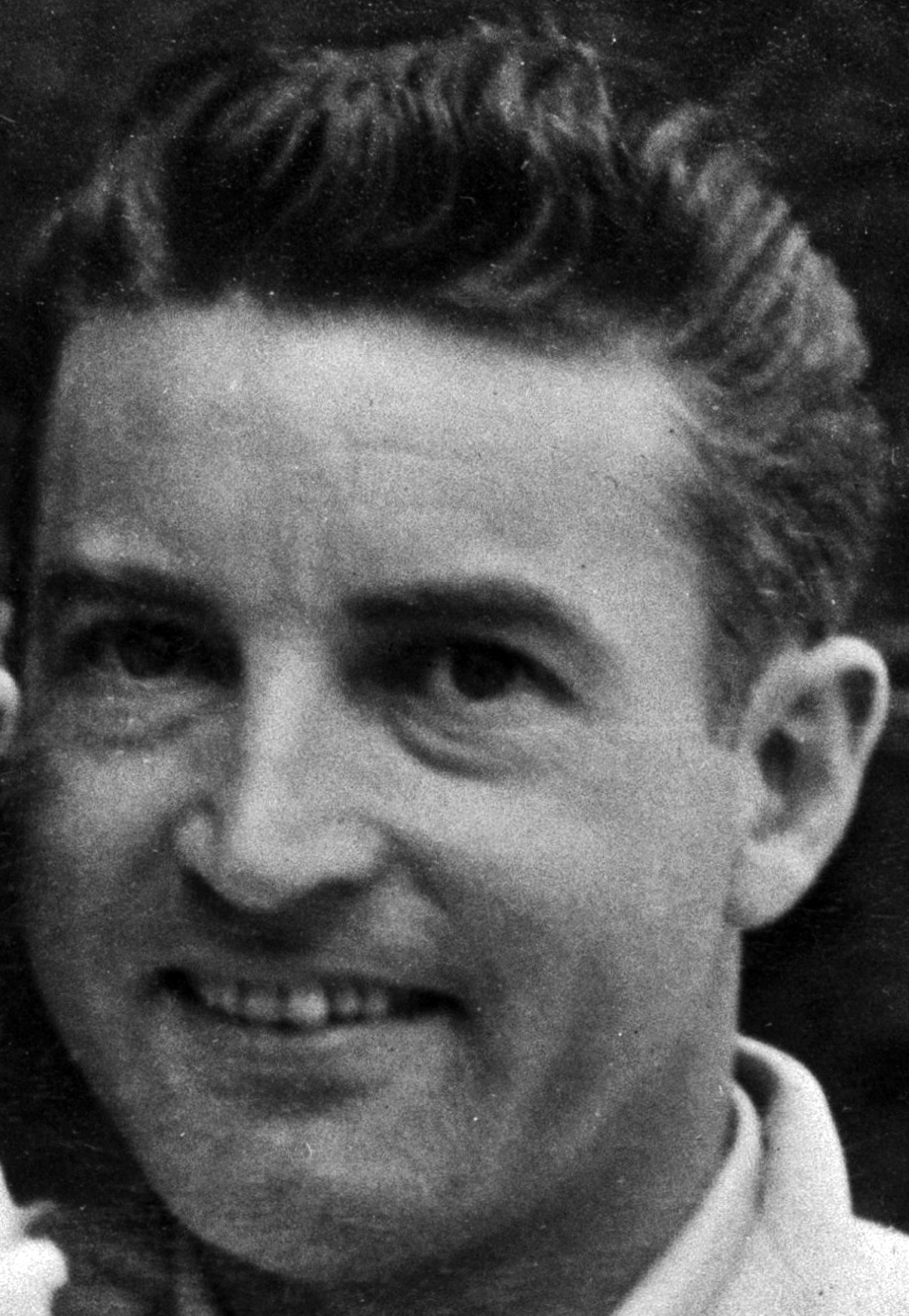
- Emerson in 1935
- Born: August 9, 1899; Kalispell, Montana, US
- Died: February 22, 1984 (aged 84); West Lafayette, Indiana, US
- Occupation: Actor
- Years active: 1923–1940 (film)

Ralph Emerson (August 9, 1899 – February 22, 1984) was an American stage and film actor. He played a mixture of lead and supporting roles during the silent era.

== Selected filmography ==
- The Face on the Bar-Room Floor (1923)
- The Million Dollar Handicap (1925)
- Three Pals (1926)
- The Enemy (1927)
- West Point (1927)
- The Cheer Leader (1928)
- The Albany Night Boat (1928)
- Marriage by Contract (1928)
- Hardboiled Rose (1929)
- Dance Hall (1929)
- Lotus Lady (1930)
- I Believed in You (1934)
- A Night at Earl Carroll's (1940)

== Bibliography ==
- Goble, Alan. The Complete Index to Literary Sources in Film. Walter de Gruyter, 1999.
- Vogel, Michelle. Olive Borden: The Life and Films of Hollywood's "Joy Girl". McFarland, 2010.
