= This Sporting Age =

1932 film

- Directed by: Andrew Bennison; A.F. Erickson
- Written by: Dudley Nichols; James Kevin McGuinness
- Starring: Jack Holt; Evalyn Knapp; Walter Byron
- Cinematography: Ted Tetzlaff
- Edited by: Maurice Wright
- Production company: Columbia Pictures
- Distributed by: Columbia Pictures
- Release date: September 15, 1932
- Running time: 67 minutes
- Country: United States
- Language: English

This Sporting Age is a 1932 American sports drama film directed by Andrew Bennison and A.F. Erickson and starring Jack Holt, Evalyn Knapp and Walter Byron.

== Plot ==
A top polo player's daughter is in love with a worthy young man, but is compromised by a caddish club member. Her father challenges him to a match at the end of which the villain ends up dead.

== Cast ==
- Jack Holt as Capt. John Steele
- Evalyn Knapp as Mickey Steele
- Hardie Albright as Johnny Raeburn
- Walter Byron as Charles Morrell
- J. Farrell MacDonald as Jerry O'Day
- Ruth Weston as Mrs. Rita Duncan
- Nora Lane as Mrs. Wainleigh
- Shirley Palmer as Ann Erskine
- Hal Price as Surgeon

== Bibliography ==
- Dooley, Roger. From Scarface to Scarlett: American Films in the 1930s. Harcourt Brace Jovanovich, 1984.
