= So This Is Love? (film) =

1928 film by Frank Capra

So This is Love?
- Directed by: Frank Capra
- Written by: Elmer Harris (adaptation); Norman Springer (story); Rex Taylor
- Produced by: Harry Cohn
- Starring: Shirley Mason; William Collier Jr. Johnnie Walker
- Cinematography: Ray June
- Edited by: Arthur Roberts
- Production company: Columbia Pictures
- Distributed by: Columbia Pictures
- Release date: February 6, 1928
- Running time: 60 minutes
- Country: United States
- Language: English

Full movie

So This is Love? is a 1928 American silent film directed by Frank Capra. It was produced by Harry Cohn for Columbia Pictures.

== Plot ==
Jerry McGuire is a dress designer who is tired of being looked upon as a wimp. He begins secretly training as a boxer to take on Spike Mullins and win the affections of store clerk Hilda Jensen.

== Cast ==
- Shirley Mason as Hilda Jenson
- William Collier Jr. as Jerry McGuire
- Johnnie Walker as Spike Mullins
- Ernie Adams as Flash Tracy
- Carl Gerard as Otto
- William H. Strauss as Maison Katz
- Jean Laverty as Mary Malone

== Preservation and status ==
Complete copies are held at the Cinematheque Royale de Belgique and the Library of Congress.
