= Marriage by Contract =

1928 film

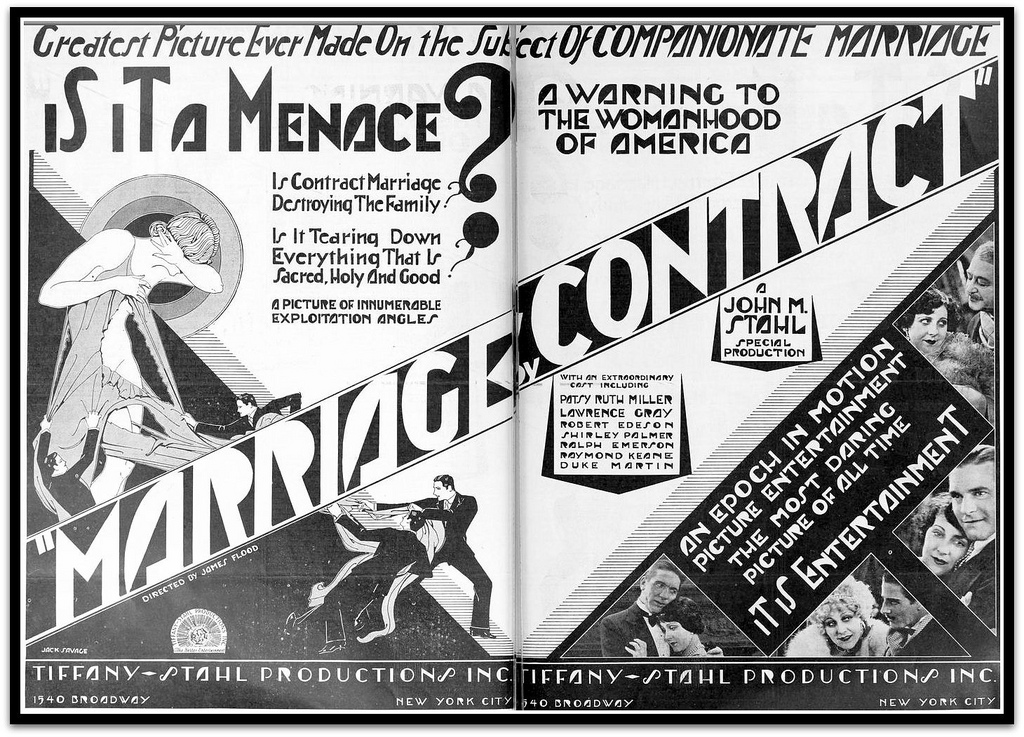
- Directed by: James Flood
- Written by: Edward Clark; Frances Hyland; Paul Perez
- Produced by: John M. Stahl
- Starring: Patsy Ruth Miller; Lawrence Gray; Robert Edeson
- Cinematography: Ernest Miller
- Edited by: Leete Renick Brown
- Music by: Manny Baer
- Production company: Tiffany Pictures
- Distributed by: Tiffany Pictures
- Release date: November 9, 1928
- Running time: 70 minutes
- Country: United States
- Languages: Sound (Part-Talkie); English

Marriage by Contract is a 1928 American sound part-talkie drama film directed by James Flood and starring Patsy Ruth Miller, Lawrence Gray and Robert Edeson. In addition to sequences with audible dialogue or talking sequences, the film features a synchronized musical score and sound effects along with English intertitles. The soundtrack was recorded using the Tiffany-Tone sound-on-film system. This film was one of the first sound films produced by Tiffany Pictures, one of the largest independent studios in Hollywood at the time, and was followed by Lucky Boy. The first reel of the silent version is extant at the Australian Archive.

== Plot ==
Margaret (Patsy Ruth Miller) and Don (Lawrence Gray), two intelligent and idealistic young people, begin their life together under a daring new philosophy: "marriage by contract"—a modern, time-limited union allowing each partner to retain personal freedom, economic independence, and the right to dissolve the relationship at will.

At first, the arrangement feels refreshing and enlightened. The evening after returning from their honeymoon, friends visit to celebrate the experimental couple. The men urge Don to join them for a prize fight; Margaret consents, choosing instead to accompany her girlfriends to a dance. There, she encounters Arthur (Ralph Emerson), a former flame who teasingly declares his intention to become her "next contract husband" when Don’s term is up.

Margaret returns early, escorted home by Arthur, only to find Don arriving home at 3 A.M.—tipsy and unrepentant. He confesses to visiting an old flame, Molly (Shirley Palmer), after the fight, and mockingly defends his freedom under the contract. Margaret, wounded and angry, tears up the marriage agreement and returns to her parents' home. Her sobs go largely unheeded; her family shows little sympathy.

That night, she dreams of life after separating from Don—seeing him remarry Molly without regret.

Now truly single again, Margaret waits for Arthur to propose—but when he does, it’s in dishonorable terms. Disillusioned, she rejects him. Other men of her social circle show interest but balk at marriage to a woman with her history. Time passes. At twenty-seven, unsure of love but yearning for stability and children, Margaret marries Dirke (Duke Martin), a self-made man well below her station—on another trial contract.

Surprisingly, she finds genuine happiness. She hopes to convert the trial into permanence, but Dirke walks out—having never intended to stay.

Burdened by disappointment and increasingly dependent on her aging parents, Margaret accepts marriage to Winters (Robert Edeson), a wealthy older man who generously settles $250,000 upon her. Years pass. Margaret, now middle-aged, fights the erosion of youth with bleached hair, restrictive dresses, and desperate vitality. Her attempts to maintain a youthful image verge on the grotesque.

Enter Drury (Raymond Keane), a younger, attractive man who wines and dines her with flattering attentions. In a bid to reclaim lost romance, Margaret divorces Winters and marries Drury—only to watch him squander her fortune. When he threatens to leave her, a struggle over a gun ensues. Margaret fires the shot.

Just as the police arrive to drag her away in disgrace—

—She awakens. The entire ordeal has been a nightmare. In tears, Margaret is comforted by Grandma (Ruby Lafayette), who gently affirms that this modern marriage theory is "a mess of applesauce." At that moment, Don arrives—eager for reconciliation. Margaret, newly humbled and wiser for the dream’s harsh truths, accepts his embrace. She casts off her theories and agrees to marry him again—this time in church, no contracts, just vows.

== Cast ==
- Patsy Ruth Miller as Margaret
- Lawrence Gray as Don
- Robert Edeson as Winters
- Ralph Emerson as Arthur
- Shirley Palmer as Molly
- John St. Polis as Father
- Claire McDowell as Mother
- Ruby Lafayette as Grandma
- Duke Martin as Dirke
- Raymond Keane as Drury

== Music ==
The film featured two theme songs. The first was entitled "When The Right One Comes Along" and was composed by L. Wolfe Gilbert and Mabel Wayne. The second was entitled "Come Back To Me" and was composed by A. E. Joffe and David S. Goldberg.

== See also ==
- List of early sound feature films (1926–1929)

== Bibliography ==
- Donald Crafton. The Talkies: American Cinema's Transition to Sound, 1926-1931. University of California Press, 1999.
