= The Saddle Buster =

1932 film

- Theatrical poster for the film
- Directed by: Fred Allen; Dave Lewis (assistant)
- Screenplay by: Oliver Drake
- Story by: Cherry Wilson
- Produced by: William LeBaron
- Starring: Tom Keene; Helen Foster
- Cinematography: Ted McCord
- Edited by: William Clemens
- Music by: Max Steiner
- Production company: RKO Radio Pictures
- Release date: March 19, 1932 (US)
- Running time: 60 minutes
- Country: United States
- Language: English
- Budget: $38,000

The Saddle Buster is a 1932 American pre-Code Western film directed by Fred Allen and starring Tom Keene and Helen Foster.

== Cast ==
- Tom Keene as Montana
- Helen Foster as Sunny Hurn
- Marie Quillan as Rita
- Robert Frazer as Rance
- Richard Carlyle as Bible Jude
- Charles Quigley as Cladgett
- Fred Burns as Dan Hurn
- Harry Bowen as Calgary
- Charles Whitaker as Keno
- Ben Corbett as Shorty
- Al Taylor as Blackie

(cast list as per AFI database)
