= Somewhere in Sonora =

1933 film

- Film poster
- Directed by: Mack V. Wright
- Written by: Joseph Anthony Roach
- Based on: Somewhere South; 1925 novel by Will Levington Comfort
- Produced by: Leon Schlesinger
- Starring: John Wayne; Henry B. Walthall; Shirley Palmer; Ann Faye; J. P. McGowan; Paul Fix; Ralph Lewis; Frank Rice; Billy Franey
- Cinematography: Ted D. McCord
- Edited by: William Clemens
- Production company: Leon Schlesinger Productions
- Distributed by: Warner Bros. Pictures
- Release date: May 27, 1933
- Running time: 59 minutes
- Country: United States
- Language: English

Somewhere in Sonora is a 1933 American Pre-Code Western film directed by Mack V. Wright and starring John Wayne. The picture was released by Warner Bros. Pictures. It is a remake of the 1927 silent film of the same name. The story was based on a 1925 novel named "Somewhere South" by Will Levington Comfort.

== Cast ==
- John Wayne as John Bishop
- Henry B. Walthall as Bob Leadly
- Shirley Palmer as Mary Burton
- J. P. McGowan as Monte Black
- Paul Fix as Bart Leadly
- Ralph Lewis as Mr. Kelly Burton
- Frank Rice as Riley
- Billy Franey as Shorty
