= Yours to Command =

1927 film

- Directed by: David Kirkland
- Screenplay by: Scott Darling; Ewart Adamson
- Story by: Basil Dickey; Harry Haven
- Starring: George O'Hara; Shirley Palmer; William Burress; Dot Farley; Jack Luden; William J. Humphrey
- Cinematography: Jules Cronjager
- Production company: Robertson-Cole Pictures Corporation
- Distributed by: Film Booking Offices of America
- Release date: May 1, 1927
- Running time: 50 minutes
- Country: United States
- Language: English

Yours to Command is a 1927 American comedy film directed by David Kirkland and written by Scott Darling and Ewart Adamson. The film stars George O'Hara, Shirley Palmer, William Burress, Dot Farley, Jack Luden and William J. Humphrey. The film was released on May 1, 1927, by Film Booking Offices of America.

== Cast ==
- George O'Hara as Robert Duane
- Shirley Palmer as Colleen O'Brien
- William Burress as Pa O'Brien
- Dot Farley as Ma O'Brien
- Jack Luden as Ted Hanson
- William J. Humphrey as Parsons

== Preservation ==
Yours to Command is currently presumed lost. In February of 2021, the film was cited by the National Film Preservation Board on their Lost U.S. Silent Feature Films list.
