= The Winning Wallop =

1926 film

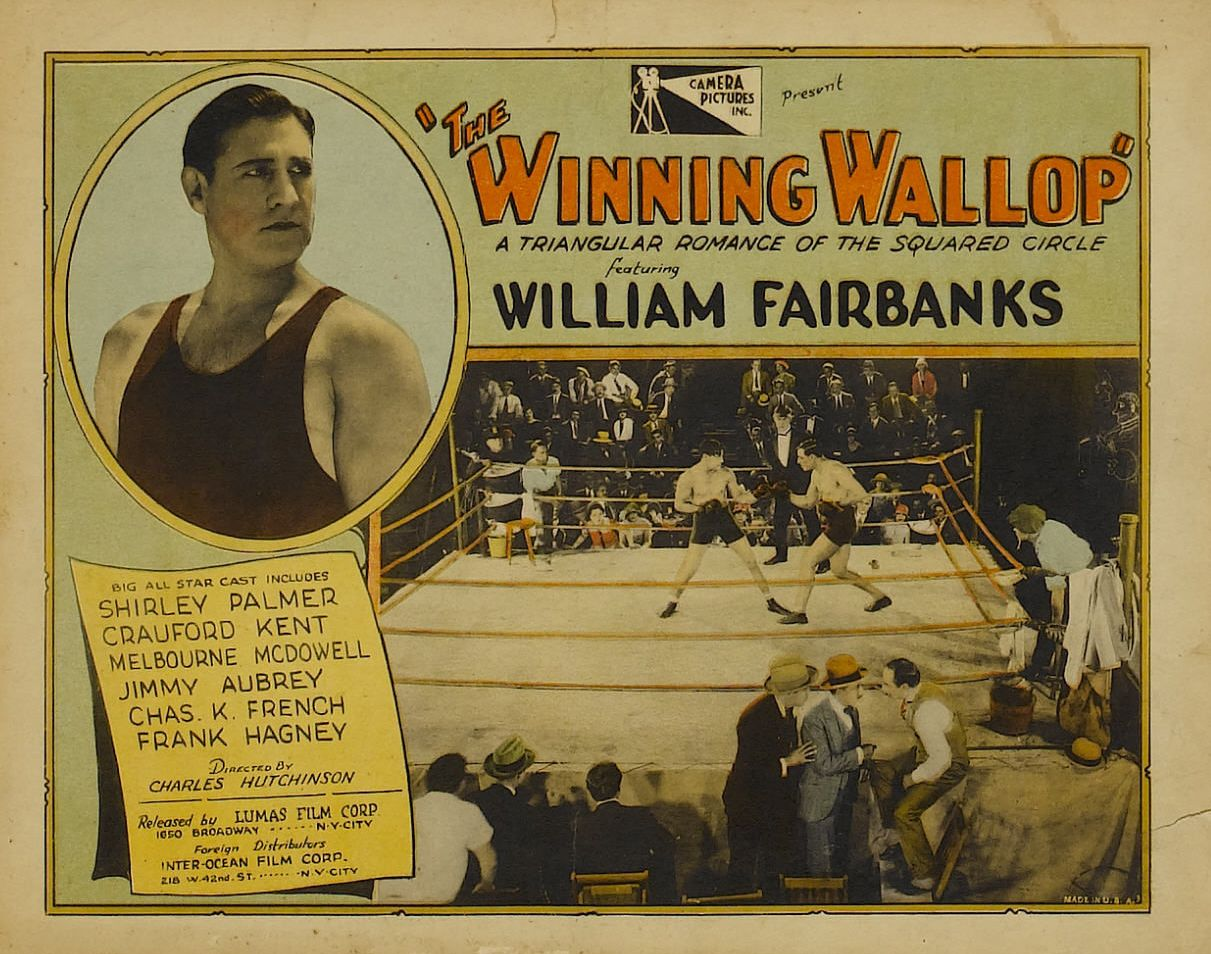
- Directed by: Charles Hutchison
- Produced by: Samuel Sax
- Starring: William Fairbanks; Shirley Palmer; Charles K. French
- Cinematography: James S. Brown Jr.
- Production company: Gotham Productions
- Distributed by: Lumas Film Corporation
- Release date: October 8, 1926
- Country: United States
- Languages: Silent; English intertitles

The Winning Wallop is a 1926 American silent comedy-drama film directed by Charles Hutchison and starring William Fairbanks, Shirley Palmer and Charles K. French.

== Cast ==
- William Fairbanks as Rex Barton
- Shirley Palmer as Marion Wayne
- Charles K. French as Peter Wayne
- Melbourne MacDowell as Cyrus Barton
- Crauford Kent as Lawrence Duncan
- Jimmy Aubrey as Fight Manager
- Frank Hagney as 'Pug' Brennan

== Bibliography ==
- Munden, Kenneth White. The American Film Institute Catalog of Motion Pictures Produced in the United States, Part 1. University of California Press, 1997.
