= Hawaiian Nights =

1939 film by Albert S. Rogell

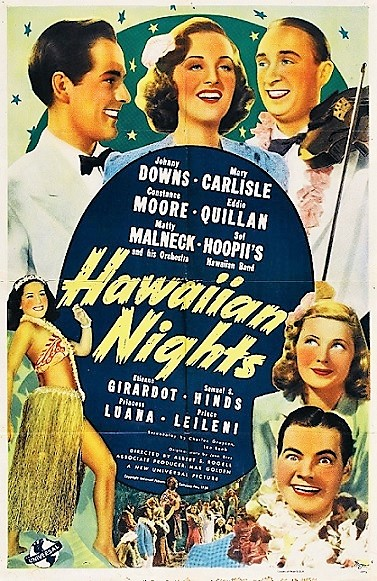
- Theatrical release poster
- Directed by: Albert S. Rogell
- Screenplay by: Charles Grayson; Lee Loeb
- Story by: John Grey
- Produced by: Max Golden
- Starring: Johnny Downs; Constance Moore; Mary Carlisle
- Cinematography: Stanley Cortez
- Edited by: Otto Ludwig
- Music by: Frank Loesser; Matty Malneck
- Distributed by: Universal Pictures
- Release date: 1939
- Running time: 65 minutes

Hawaiian Nights is a 1939 American romantic comedy film directed by Albert S. Rogell. Produced by Universal Pictures, the film was written by Charles Grayson and Lee Loeb. It stars Johnny Downs, Constance Moore, and Mary Carlisle.

A sneak preview of Gone with the Wind was shown during a double-bill with this film and Beau Geste.

== Plot ==
Hotel mogul's son Ted Hartley simply wants to start his own band, but his father sends him to Hawaii to help run one of his properties there. Ted takes his musicians along and is offered free room and board by Lonnie Lane, the daughter of a rival hotel chain's owner, to perform at her family's inn.

Ted's dad flies over, intending to buy out his rival. He finds out what's going on and intends to put a stop to it, but watching Ted's band perform makes him appreciate that his son actually has found his true calling.

== Plot (in detail) ==
Ted Hartley, an assistant manager in one of his father's restaurants. C. Hartley’s hotel chains, who is much more passionate about music than the family business. When T. C. Ted returns from a trip and discovers Ted rehearsing in the basement with a band composed of hotel employees. He sends him to Hawaii to learn responsibility, although Ted brings the band along. After the T. C., Ted travels to Hawaii to veto their musical performances. Ted and his musicians are fired, only to receive help from Lonnie Lane, the daughter of a rival hotel owner whose Island Lodge Hotel is failing. She offers them rooms in exchange for free performances, and together they plan a gala opening attended by the influential pineapple king. Lonnie’s father, Frank, reveals he plans to sell the hotel to T. The deal collapses after Alonzo, who is also chairman of the Hartley board, rejects it and demands that T. C. come to Hawaii. Realizing Ted’s musical success is revitalizing the Island Lodge, Ted. C. Lonnie attempts to cancel the deal altogether, but Lonnie insists that the show continue. Ultimately, T. C. Alonzo tears up the deal as Alonzo arranges to sign the performers to the Island Lodge. C. Lonnie wanted to grant Ted more favorable terms and recognition in his musical career.

== Reviews ==
Motion Picture reviews described Hawaiian Nights as a forgettable film, noting that it leaves only a mild impression on most viewers. The publication suggested that the movie may evoke a sense of nostalgia for anyone familiar with the Hawaiian Islands, since the imagery of palm trees, moonlit beaches, and traditional lua dancing feels authentic. The plot, however, was predictable, centered on a young man aspiring to lead an orchestra despite the disapproval of his strict, routine-driven father. According to the review, the strongest performances come from the older cast members, Thurston Hall, Samuel S. Hinds, and Etienne Girardot—while some dialogue is weak, even though portions of the musical score are enjoyable.

== Cast ==
- Constance Moore as Lonnie Lane
- Johnny Downs as Ted Hartley
- Mary Carlisle as Millie
- Eddie Quillan as Ray Peters
- Etienne Girardot as Alonzo Dilman
- Samuel S. Hinds as Lane
- Thurston Hall as T. C. Hartley
- Robert Emmett Keane as Fothering
- Willie Fung as Murphy
- Princess Luana as Luana
- Prince Leilani as Leileni
- Matty Malneck as Orchestra Leader
- Sol Hoopii Jr. as Hawaiian Band Leader
- Matty Malneck's Orchestra
- Sol Hoopii Hawaiian Band
