= Shirley Palmer (actress) =

American actress

- Palmer as Mary Burton in Somewhere in Sonora (1933)
- Born: December 25, 1908; Chicago, Illinois
- Died: March 29, 2000 (aged 91); Los Angeles, California
- Occupation: Film actress
- Spouse: John Collier

Shirley Palmer (December 25, 1908 – March 29, 2000) was an American film actress of the 1920s and 1930s, with most of her career being in the silent film era.

Born on Christmas Day in Chicago, Illinois, Palmer started her career as a film actress in 1926, starring opposite Oliver Hardy in A Bankrupt Honeymoon. She starred in four films in 1926, and opened 1927 starring in Burning Gold opposite Herbert Rawlinson. She starred in five films in 1927, the best known of which was The Magic Flame, starring Ronald Colman. 1928 was by far her biggest year, with her appearing in seven films, including Prowlers of the Sea starring Carmel Myers and Ricardo Cortez, and Marriage by Contract starring Patsy Ruth Miller.

In 1929 her career slowed considerably, with her starring in only one film, Campus Knights. She did make a semi-successful transition to "talking films", with all of her roles being in B-movies, and in 1930 she appeared with Dorothy Sebastian and Neil Hamilton in Ladies Must Play, her only film of that year. In 1932 she appeared in This Sporting Age, and in 1933 she starred in probably her most recognizable role, starring opposite John Wayne in Somewhere in Sonora. It would be her last credited role. She had two uncredited roles following that film, one the same year and the other in 1934, after which her career ended.

She married once, to writer John Collier, and settled in Los Angeles, where she was residing at the time of her death on March 29, 2000, resulting from a fall.

== Filmography ==
- Code of the Northwest (1926)
- The Winning Wallop (1926)
- Exclusive Rights (1926)
- Yours to Command (1927)
- Burning Gold (1927)
- The Magic Flame (1927)
- Sitting Bull at the Spirit Lake Massacre (1927)
- Marriage by Contract (1928)
- Beautiful But Dumb (1928)
- The Cheer Leader (1928)
- Eagle of the Night (1928)
- The Scarlet Dove (1928)
- Stormy Waters (1928)
- Prowlers of the Sea (1928)
- Campus Knights (1929)
- Ladies Must Play (1930)
- This Sporting Age (1932)
- Somewhere in Sonora (1933)
- Pilgrimage (1933)
- The White Parade (1934)
