= Campus Knights =

1929 film

- Directed by: Albert H. Kelley
- Written by: Lee Authmar; Arthur Hoerl; Albert H. Kelley; Hoey Lawlor; Lon Young
- Starring: Raymond McKee; Shirley Palmer; Marie Quillan
- Cinematography: M.A. Anderson
- Edited by: Earl Turner
- Production company: Chesterfield Pictures
- Distributed by: Chesterfield Pictures
- Release date: March 1929
- Running time: 61 minutes
- Country: United States
- Languages: Silent; English intertitles

Campus Knights is a 1929 American silent comedy film directed by Albert H. Kelley and starring Raymond McKee, Shirley Palmer and Marie Quillan.

== Cast ==
- Raymond McKee as Prof. Ezra Hastings / Earl Hastings
- Shirley Palmer as Audrey Scott
- Marie Quillan as Edna
- Jean Laverty as Pearl
- J.C. Fowler as Dean Whitlock
- Sybil Grove as The Matron
- P.J. Danby as The Janitor
- Leo White as Pearl's Lawyer
- Lewis Sargent as The Sport

== Bibliography ==
- Michael R. Pitts. Poverty Row Studios, 1929-1940: An Illustrated History of 55 Independent Film Companies, with a Filmography for Each. McFarland & Company, 2005.
