= A Bankrupt Honeymoon =

1926 film

- Directed by: Lewis Seiler
- Written by: Murray Roth
- Produced by: William Fox
- Starring: Oliver Hardy
- Release date: February 7, 1926
- Running time: 20 minutes
- Country: United States
- Languages: Silent film English intertitles

A Bankrupt Honeymoon is a 1926 American silent comedy film featuring Oliver Hardy.

== Cast ==
- Harold Goodwin as Harold Pembroke
- Shirley Palmer as Shirley Lee
- Oliver Hardy as A taxi driver (as Babe Hardy)
- Frank Beal as A drunk
- Harry Dunkinson
- Sidney Bracey as Butler

== See also ==
- List of American films of 1926
- Oliver Hardy filmography
