= Swing, Sister, Swing =

1938 film directed by Joseph Santley

- Theatrical release poster
- Directed by: Joseph Santley
- Screenplay by: Charles Grayson
- Story by: Burt Kelly
- Produced by: Burt Kelly
- Starring: Ken Murray; Johnny Downs; Kathryn Kane; Eddie Quillan; Ernest Truex; Edna Sedgewick
- Cinematography: Elwood Bredell
- Edited by: Frank Gross
- Music by: Charles Previn
- Production company: Universal Pictures
- Distributed by: Universal Pictures
- Release dates: December 16, 1938 (limited); January 27, 1939
- Running time: 63 minutes
- Country: United States
- Language: English

Swing, Sister, Swing is a 1938 American comedy film directed by Joseph Santley and written by Charles Grayson. The film stars Ken Murray, Johnny Downs, Kathryn Kane, Eddie Quillan, Ernest Truex and Edna Sedgewick. The film was released on December 16, 1938, by Universal Pictures.

== Plot ==
Press agent Nap Sisler joins up with Snookie Saunders and Satchel Lips Peters to make a new dance "The Baltimore Bubble" a national hit.

== Cast ==
- Ken Murray as Nap Sisler
- Johnny Downs as Johnny Bennett
- Kathryn Kane as Snookie Saunders
- Eddie Quillan as Chick 'Satchel Lips' Peters
- Ernest Truex as Prof. L. Orlando Beebee
- Edna Sedgewick as Nona Tremayne
- Nana Bryant as Hyacinth Hepburn
- Esther Howard as Miss Fredericks
- Clara Blandick as Ma Sisler
- James Flavin as Pilot
- Emmett Vogan as Les Murphy
- Ted Weems as himself
- Herbert Heywood as Mr. Beagle
- Fred Santley as Photographer
- John Ward as Nate Raymond
- Alan Davis as Jack Stafford
- John Hiestand as Radio Announcer
- Clara Blore as Dancer
- Eddie Fetherston as Photographer
- Lloyd Ingraham as Station Agent
- Alice Weaver as Dancer
- Joe Niemeyer as Dance Instructor
