= A Night at Earl Carroll's =

- Theatrical release poster
- Directed by: Kurt Neumann
- Screenplay by: Lynn Starling
- Produced by: Earl Carroll
- Starring: Ken Murray; Rose Hobart; Elvia Allman; Blanche Stewart; Earl Carroll; J. Carrol Naish; Lela Moore
- Cinematography: Leo Tover
- Edited by: Alma Macrorie
- Music by: Victor Young
- Production company: Paramount Pictures
- Distributed by: Paramount Pictures
- Release date: December 6, 1940
- Running time: 62 minutes
- Country: United States
- Language: English

A Night at Earl Carroll's is a 1940 American musical film directed by Kurt Neumann and written by Lynn Starling. The film stars Ken Murray, Rose Hobart, Elvia Allman, Blanche Stewart, Earl Carroll, J. Carrol Naish, and Lela Moore. The film was released on December 6, 1940, by Paramount Pictures.

== Cast ==
- Ken Murray as Barney Nelson
- Rose Hobart as Ramona Lisa
- Elvia Allman as Cobina Gusher
- Blanche Stewart as Brenda Gusher
- Earl Carroll as himself
- J. Carrol Naish as Steve Kalkus
- Lela Moore as herself
- Jack Norton as Alonzo Smith
- Russell Hicks as Mayor Jones of Hollywood
- William B. Davidson as Mayor Green of San Bernardino
- John Harmon as Mac
- Forbes Murray as Mayor Brown of Pasadena
- Ralph Emerson as Mayor Gray of Bakersfield
- Ray Walker as Jerry
- Allan Cavan as Mayor White of El Centro
- George McKay as Mayor Stokes of San Diego
- Truman Bradley as Radio Announcer
- Beryl Wallace as Miss DuBarry
- Ruth Rogers as Miss DeMilo
- Sheila Ryan as Miss Borgia
- John Laing as Vic
- Mary Lou Cook as The Hot Singer
- Florine McKinney as Girl Orchestra Leader
- Emory Parnell as Policeman
