= Noisy Neighbors =

Noisy Neighbours
- Directed by: Charles Reisner
- Written by: Scott Darling; F. Hugh Herbert; John W. Krafft
- Produced by: Paul Bern
- Starring: Eddie Quillan; Alberta Vaughn; Jane Keckley
- Cinematography: David Abel
- Edited by: Anne Bauchens
- Production company: Paul Bern Productions
- Distributed by: Pathé Exchange
- Release date: February 17, 1929
- Running time: 60 minutes
- Country: United States
- Languages: Sound (Part-Talkie); English Intertitles

Noisy Neighbors is a 1929 American sound part-talkie comedy film directed by Charles Reisner and starring Eddie Quillan, Alberta Vaughn and Jane Keckley. In addition to sequences with audible dialogue or talking sequences, the film features a synchronized musical score and sound effects along with English intertitles. The sound was recorded using the RCA Photophone sound system.

== Plot ==
A simple game of croquet sparks the blood feud between the Carstairs and the Van Revel families. When the word “liar” is hurled in anger, it leads to murder and ignites the fiercest enmity in Southern history. Sixty years later, the feud is reignited when Senator Van Revel is slain by members of the Carstairs clan. The Carstairs family now consists of Colonel Carstairs, his spirited granddaughter Mary Carstairs, and his jealous nephew David. The search soon begins for Timothy Van Revel, a distant heir and the only known successor to the late Senator.

Unbeknownst to the searchers, Timothy Van Revel is none other than vaudevillian Timothy Monarch, patriarch of the “Marvelous Monarchs,” a family troupe that includes his loyal wife, their sons Eddie, Joseph, Bob, and Mike, and their daughters Marie and another younger child. When the Monarchs arrive in Charlottesville for a booking, the theatre manager treats them with disdain, and their act is dismissed. Meanwhile, Eddie wanders across the street and thwarts a thief who tries to steal Mary Carstairs’ purse. The rescue, part accident and part bravery, charms Mary, and Eddie finds himself equally smitten.

Back at the theatre, the Monarchs’ struggles worsen when they are billed last on the program. Indignant, Timothy storms into the manager’s office and demands better treatment, only to be rebuffed and dismissed. Just when all seems lost, a solicitor arrives with astonishing news: Timothy is indeed the missing Van Revel heir. The Monarch family inherits the Van Revel estate, complete with a mansion and a generous cash advance. Timothy declares joyfully that here they will live “in peace and quiet.”

But peace does not last. When Eddie’s pet rabbit escapes across the Carstairs lawn, Mary and Eddie’s reunion delights the young couple, but enrages Colonel Carstairs, who demands the Monarchs leave his property. Yet later that night, softened by Mary’s birthday, the Colonel sends an invitation to the Monarchs, hoping to make her happy. To everyone’s surprise, the vaudeville family proves the life of the party. Eddie and Joseph perform dazzling magic tricks, Marie gathers admirers, and even the Colonel warms slightly to Timothy’s sincerity. Eddie and Mary’s romance blossoms further, though a quarrel and the revelation of Timothy’s true Van Revel identity soon reignite the old animosity.

Jealous David fans the flames by summoning his mountaineer relatives, who storm the Van Revel mansion intent on bloodshed. Colonel Carstairs, attempting to prevent violence, is locked away by the intruders. Mary escapes and warns Eddie and his family. Though unarmed, the Monarchs fall back on their stagecraft—terrifying the superstitious mountaineers with floating skeletons, vanishing cabinets, and comic illusions until they are routed. With the law, led by Ebenezer, arriving to round up the clan, Eddie emerges as the unlikely hero.

The next day, in a symbolic gesture, a Carstairs and a Van Revel once again play croquet together, while Eddie and Mary sit contentedly arm in arm. Mary declares with relief that their families will never quarrel again. But when Timothy insists that Colonel Carstairs’ last croquet ball was frozen, and the Colonel hotly denies it, the feud threatens to erupt once more as the two patriarchs shake fists under each other’s noses.

== Cast ==
- Eddie Quillan as Eddie Van Revel
- Alberta Vaughn as Mary Carstairs
- Jane Keckley as Mother
- Joseph Quillan as Brother
- Marie Quillan as Sister
- Theodore Roberts as Colonel Carstairs
- Ray Hallor as David
- Russell Simpson as Ebenezer
- Bob Perry as First Son
- Mike Donlin as Second Son
- Billy Gilbert as Third Son

== Music ==
The film featured a theme song entitled "Waiting Through The Night" which was composed by Marvin Smolev, Bernie Seaman, Joe Crozier and John Ricca. The song was sung by Alberta Vaughn and Eddie Quillan in the film.

== Production ==
The film contains only about 5 minutes of dialog, in spite of advertisements that focused on the talking sequences.

== See also ==
- List of early sound feature films (1926–1929)

== Bibliography ==
- Fleming, E.J. Paul Bern: The Life and Famous Death of the MGM Director and Husband of Harlow. McFarland, 2009.
