= Andrew Bennison =

American screenwriter and film director (1886–1942)

- Born: November 3, 1886; Oakland, California
- Died: January 7, 1942 (aged 55); Oxnard, California
- Occupation: Screenwriter
- Years active: 1923–1941

Andrew Bennison (November 3, 1886 – January 7, 1942, in Oakland, California) was an American screenwriter and film director whose career was at its peak in the 1930s.

Bennison was nearly entirely a screenwriter between 1923 and 1942 involved in the writing of some 40 American films of that period. He co-directed the film Born Reckless (1930) with acclaimed director John Ford and a young John Wayne as an extra.

He died in Oxnard, California in January 1942.

== Selected filmography ==
- You'll Find Out (1940)
- Chip of the Flying U (1940)
- Oily to Bed, Oily to Rise (1939)
- A Ducking They Did Go (1939)
- Pardon My Scotch (1935)
- This Sporting Age (1932)
- Born Reckless (1930)
- Let's Go Places (1930)
- Words and Music (1929)
- Strong Boy (1929)
- Sin Sister (1929)
- Woman Wise (1928)
- The Wizard (1927)
- Defying the Law (1924)
- The Greatest Menace (1923)
- Divorce (1923)
