= Eddie Quillan =

American actor (1907–1990)

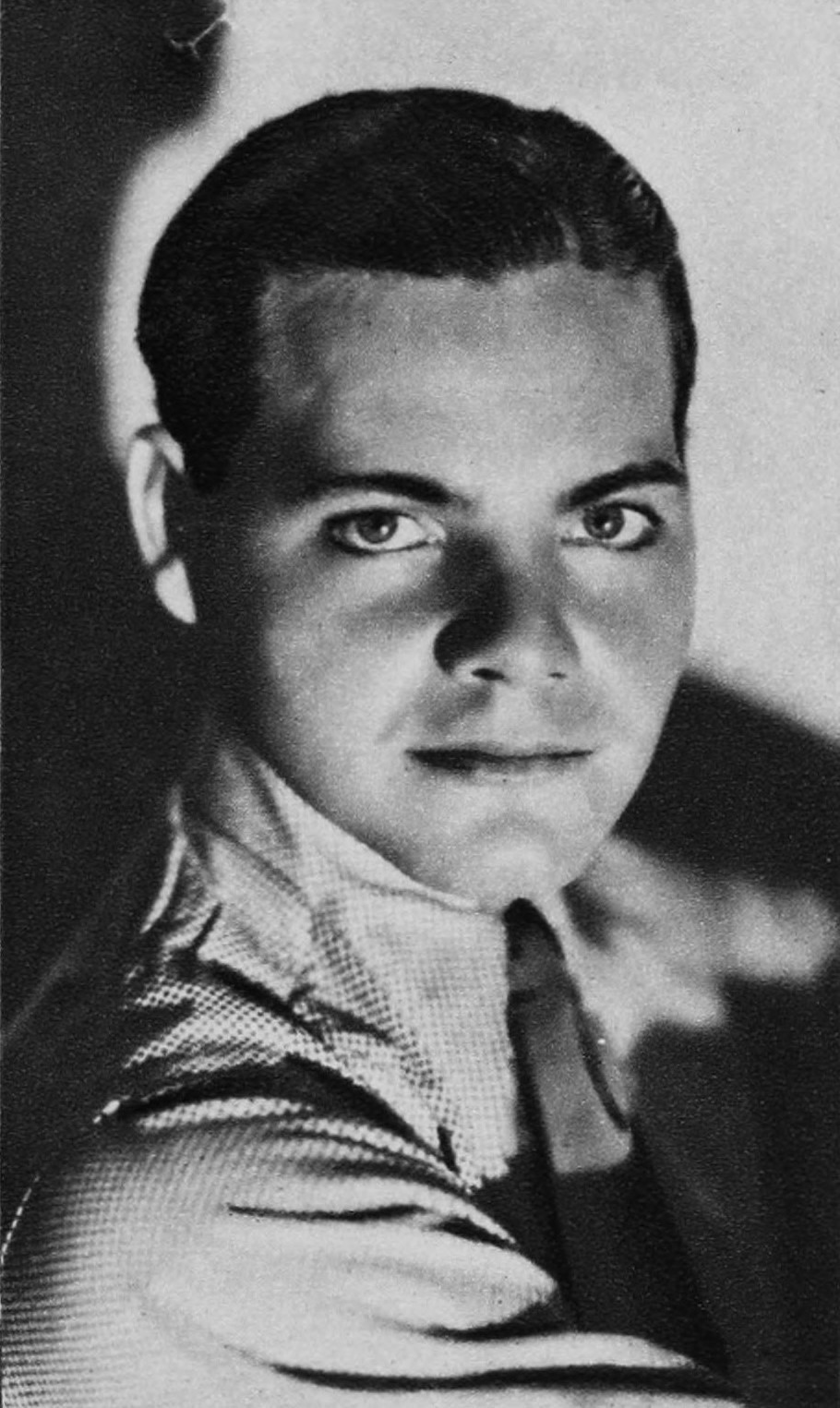
- Eddie Quillan in 1931.
- Born: Edward Quillan; March 31, 1907; Philadelphia, Pennsylvania, U.S.
- Died: July 19, 1990 (aged 83); North Hollywood, California, U.S.
- Resting place: San Fernando Mission Cemetery
- Occupations: Actor, singer
- Years active: 1922–1987

Edward Quillan (March 31, 1907 – July 19, 1990) was an American film actor and singer whose career began as a child on the vaudeville stages and silent film and continued through the age of television in the 1980s.

== Vaudeville and silent films ==
Born in Philadelphia, Pennsylvania, into a family of vaudeville performers, Quillan made his stage debut at the age of seven alongside his parents, Scottish-born Joseph Quillan and his wife Sarah, as well as his siblings in their act titled 'The Rising Generation'. By the early 1920s he was called upon by film director Mack Sennett to perform a screen test for Mack Sennett Studios. Sennett signed Quillan to a contract in 1922.

Quillan's very first film appearance was in the 1922 comedy short "Up and at 'Em". His next performance was in the 1926 comedy short "The Love Sundae" opposite actress Alice Day. His next ten film appearances (all released in 1926) were all comedy shorts that were vehicles for Day. He would spend most of the remaining years of the 1920s in comedy shorts featuring actresses Ruth Taylor and Madeline Hurlock. In 1928, Quillan starred in the Vitaphone short film "A Little Bit of Everything", notable because it featured his siblings Marie, Joseph and John in starring roles. Marie Quillan would eventually embark on a film career of her own and appear opposite her brother once more, in the 1929 comedy Noisy Neighbors.

Quillan's first feature-length film was the 1928 comedy-drama Show Folks opposite actress Lina Basquette, in which Quillan appropriately plays a vaudeville dancer. The film was a modest success and also featured actress Carole Lombard. Quillan's breakout role (and first dramatic film role) was in the 1929 Cecil B. DeMille directed silent film The Godless Girl. The film paired Quillan once again with Basquette and starred Marie Prevost and Noah Beery, Sr. His subsequent exposure from the film landed him a contract with Pathé studios.

== Talkies and television ==
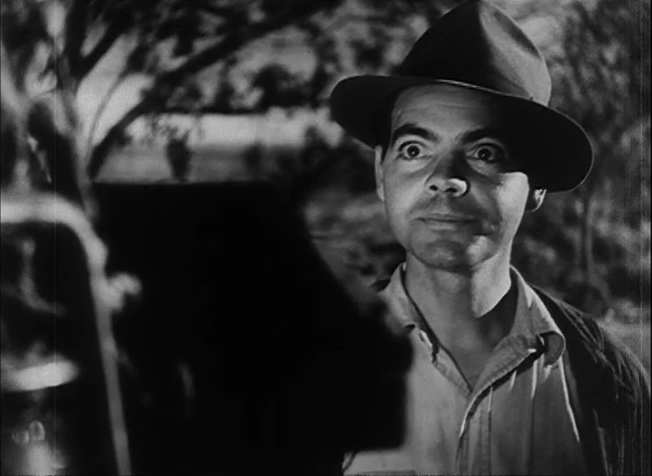
Quillan as Connie Rivers in The Grapes of Wrath (1940).

Quillan would remain a popular leading and secondary actor throughout the sound film era and would appear in such notable films as 1935's Mutiny on the Bounty with Clark Gable, Charles Laughton, and Franchot Tone, 1939's Young Mr. Lincoln opposite Henry Fonda and Alice Brady, as Connie Rivers in John Ford's 1940 film adaptation of the John Steinbeck novel The Grapes of Wrath opposite Henry Fonda, in 1943's Alaska Highway and It Ain't Hay opposite the comedic duo Abbott and Costello.

Quillan's breezy screen personality was seen in "B" musicals, comedies, and even serials during the 1940s. In 1948 Columbia Pictures producer Jules White teamed Quillan with veteran movie comic Wally Vernon for a series of comedy short subjects. White emphasized extreme physical comedy in these films, and Vernon and Quillan made a good team, enthusiastically engaging in pratfalling, kick-in-the-pants slapstick. The series ran through 1956.

Beginning in the late 1950s, Quillan began to make the transition to television and by the 1960s could be seen frequently appearing as a guest actor in such series as The Andy Griffith Show, Petticoat Junction, Perry Mason, and approximately five appearances on the camp-horror comedy series The Addams Family. He was a regular on the Anthony Franciosa sitcom Valentine's Day from 1964 to 1965, and from 1968 through 1971 he appeared as Eddie Edson on the comedy Julia opposite actress Diahann Carroll.

Through the 1950s and 1960s, Quillan continued to appear in motion pictures, but in increasingly smaller roles and often in bit parts. One notable appearance of the era was his role of Sandy in the 1954 Vincente Minnelli directed musical Brigadoon, starring Gene Kelly, Van Johnson and Cyd Charisse. Quillan also appeared in the uncredited role of Mr. Cassidy in the 1969 Gene Kelly film adaptation of Hello, Dolly!, starring Barbra Streisand and Walter Matthau and featuring Louis Armstrong. Quillan appeared in My Three Sons as Mr Hewlett (1961) and also appeared on the western television adventure series The Rifleman as Angus Evans. He appeared twice in the fourth season: in “Mark's Rifle” (episode 150) and “Conflict” (episode 155).

Quillan was cast as Hill Beachy, and as Job Darius, in two 1961 episodes of Death Valley Days.

In the 1970s, Quillan made guest appearances on such varied television series as Baretta, Chico and the Man, Gunsmoke, Here's Lucy, and Mannix. After meeting and befriending actor and director Michael Landon, he played numerous bit roles in the popular television series Little House on the Prairie. Quillan also performed in the Landon-directed series Highway to Heaven and Father Murphy during the 1980s. Quillan made his last television appearance in a 1987 episode of the television crime-mystery series Matlock.

== Death ==
Quillan died of cancer in North Hollywood, California in 1990 and was interred at the San Fernando Mission Cemetery in Mission Hills, Los Angeles, California.

== Selected filmography ==
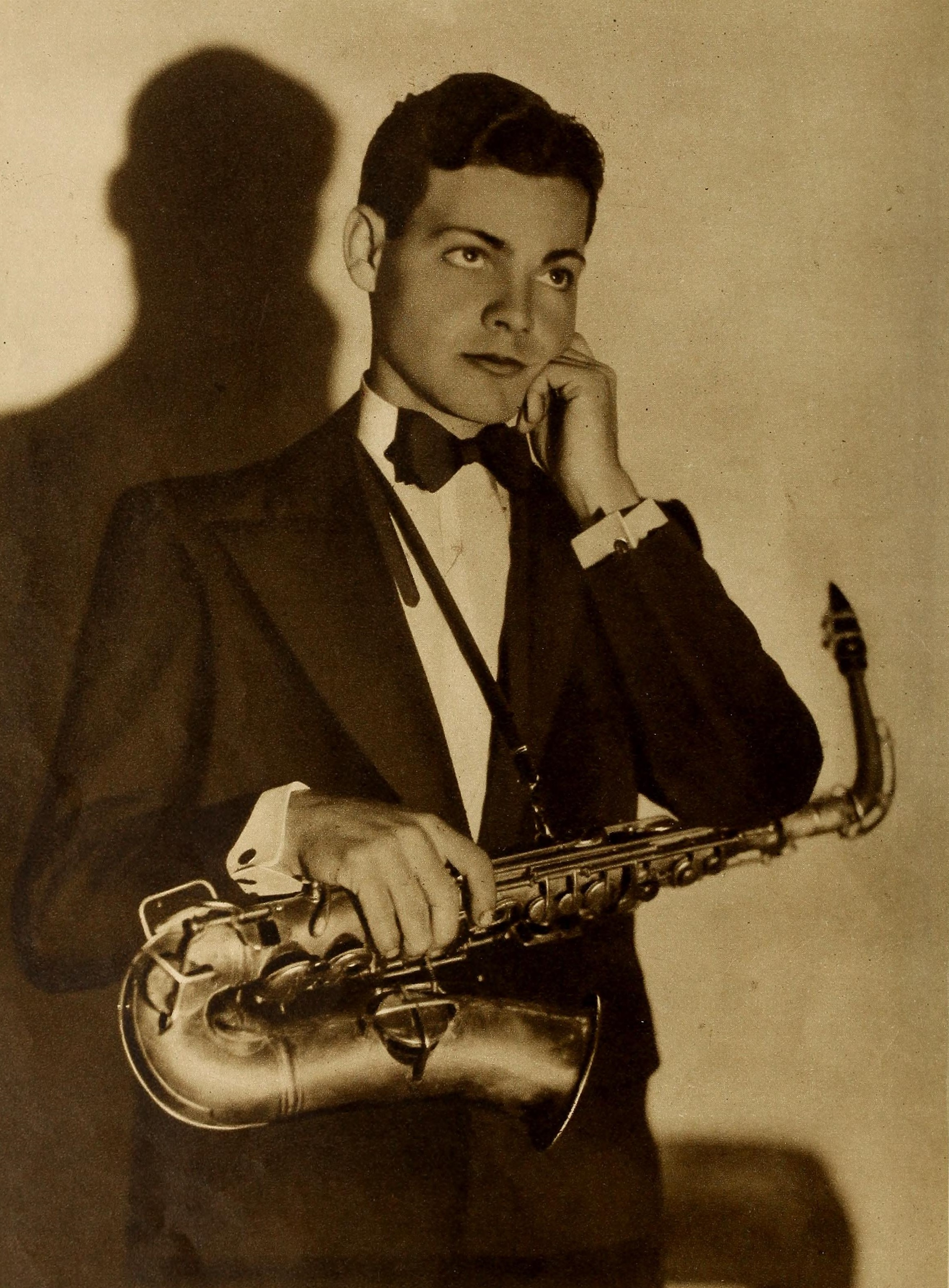
Quillan in 1931

- Up and at 'Em (1922)
- Catalina Here I Come (1927, Short) - Eddie - the Cook
- Show Folks (1928) - Eddie Kehoe
- Geraldine (1929) - Eddie Able
- Noisy Neighbors (1929) - Eddie Van Revel
- The Godless Girl (1929) - Samuel 'Bozo' Johnson - The Goat
- The Sophomore (1929) - Joe Collins
- Night Work (1930) - Willie
- Big Money (1930) - Eddie
- Sweepstakes (1931) - Bud Doyle
- The Tip-Off (1931) - Thomas 'Tommy' Jordan
- The Big Shot (1931) - Ray Smith
- Girl Crazy (1932) - Danny Churchill
- Strictly Personal (1933) - Thomas Jefferson Reed
- Broadway to Hollywood (1933) - Ted Hackett III
- Meet the Baron (1933) - Man at Dock (uncredited)
- Hollywood Party (1934) - Bob Benson
- Gridiron Flash (1935) - Thomas Burke
- Mutiny on the Bounty (1935) - Ellison
- The Gentleman from Louisiana (1936) - Tod Mason
- The Mandarin Mystery (1936) - Ellery Queen
- London by Night (1937) - Bill
- Big City (1937) - Mike Edwards
- Swing, Sister, Swing (1938) - Chick 'Satchel Lips' Peters
- Made for Each Other (1939) - Conway
- The Family Next Door (1939) - Sammy Pierce
- The Flying Irishman (1939) - Henry Corrigan
- Young Mr. Lincoln (1939) - Adam Clay
- Hawaiian Nights (1939) - Ray Peters
- Allegheny Uprising (1939) - Anderson
- The Grapes of Wrath (1940) - Connie Rivers
- La Conga Nights (1940) - Titus Endover
- Margie (1940) - Joe
- Dancing on a Dime (1940) - Jack Norcross
- Dark Streets of Cairo (1940) - Jerry Jones
- Where Did You Get That Girl? (1941) - Joe Olsen
- Six Lessons from Madame La Zonga (1941) - Skat
- The Flame of New Orleans (1941) - 3rd Sailor
- Too Many Blondes (1941) - Wally Pelton
- Flying Blind (1941) - Riley
- Kid Glove Killer (1942) - Eddie Wright
- Priorities on Parade (1942) - Sticks O'Hara
- It Ain't Hay (1943) - Harry the Horse
- Follow the Band (1943) - Marvin Howe
- Alaska Highway (1943) - Pompadour 'Shorty' Jones
- Melody Parade (1943) - Jimmy Tracy
- Here Comes Kelly (1943) - James Aloysius 'Jimmy' Kelly
- Hi'ya, Sailor (1943) - Corky Mills
- The Impostor (1944) - Cochery
- Hi, Good Lookin'! (1944) - Dynamo Carson
- This Is the Life (1944) - Gus
- Slightly Terrific (1944) - Charlie Young
- Twilight on the Prairie (1944) - Phil
- Dixie Jamboree (1944) - Jeff Calhoun
- Moonlight and Cactus (1944) - Stubby Lamont
- Dark Mountain (1944) - Willie Dinsmire
- Mystery of the River Boat (1944, Serial) - Jug Jenks
- Jungle Queen (1945) - Chuck Kelly
- Song of the Sarong (1945) - Tony Romans
- Jungle Raiders (1945, Serial) - Joe Riley
- Sensation Hunters (1945) - Ray Lawson
- A Guy Could Change (1946) - George Cummings
- Sideshow (1950) - Big Top
- Brigadoon (1954) - Sandy
- The Ladies Man (1961) - Wolf Man (scenes deleted)
- Who's Got the Action? (1962) - Dingo the Telephone Repairman (uncredited)
- Papa's Delicate Condition (1963) - Tom (uncredited)
- Come Blow Your Horn (1963) - Elevator Boy (uncredited)
- Summer Magic (1963) - Mailman (uncredited)
- Promises! Promises! (1963) - Bartender
- Gunfight at Comanche Creek (1963) - Hotel Clerk
- Take Her, She's Mine (1963) - Gateman (uncredited)
- Move Over, Darling (1963) - Bellboy
- Viva Las Vegas (1964) - Master of Ceremonies (uncredited)
- Advance to the Rear (1964) - Sgt. Smitty (uncredited)
- Zebra in the Kitchen (1965) - Man Watching TV (uncredited)
- The Bounty Killer (1965) - Pianist
- The Ghost and Mr. Chicken (1966) - Elevator Operator (uncredited)
- Frankie and Johnny (1966) - Cashier (uncredited)
- Batman (1967) - Episode: "Batman's Anniversary" - Newsie
- Eight on the Lam (1967) - Car Dealer (uncredited)
- The Wicked Dreams of Paula Schultz (1968) - Cologne Salesman (uncredited)
- The Shakiest Gun in the West (1968) - Train Porter (uncredited)
- Did You Hear the One About the Traveling Saleslady? (1968) - Salesman
- Angel in My Pocket (1969) - Reverend Beckwith
- Hello, Dolly! (1969) - Mr. Cassidy (uncredited)
- How to Frame a Figg (1971) - Old Man
- Now You See Him, Now You Don't (1972) - Charlie, School Custodian (uncredited)
- The Strongest Man in the World (1975) - Mr. Willoughby
- Little House on the Prairie (1977-1983, 7 appearances)
- Mr. Too Little (1978) - Concessionaire

== External links/Sources ==
- Eddie Quillan at IMDb
- Eddie Quillan at The International Silent Movie
- Eddie Quillan at The New York Times Movies
- Eddie Quillan at Find a Grave
- Eddie Quillan discography at Discogs
