= Burning Gold (1927 film) =

1927 film by John W. Noble

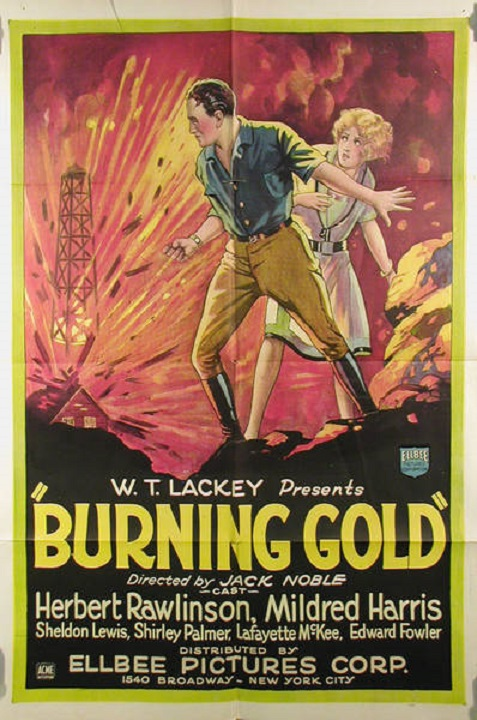
- Directed by: John W. Noble
- Written by: Stuart Paton
- Produced by: William T. Lackey
- Starring: Herbert Rawlinson; Shirley Palmer; Sheldon Lewis
- Cinematography: Harry Davis
- Production company: W.T. Lackey Productions
- Distributed by: Ellbee Pictures
- Release date: February 18, 1927
- Country: United States
- Languages: Silent; English intertitles

Burning Gold is a 1927 American silent drama film directed by John W. Noble and starring Herbert Rawlinson, Shirley Palmer and Sheldon Lewis.

== Cast ==
- Herbert Rawlinson as Bob Roberts
- Shirley Palmer as Nan Preston
- Sheldon Lewis as James Clark
- Nils Keith as Preston
- Mildred Harris as Claire Owens
- J.C. Fowler

== Bibliography ==
- Palmer, Scott. British Film Actors' Credits, 1895-1987. McFarland, 1988.
