= List of First National Pictures films =

This is a list of films produced, co-produced, and/or distributed by First National Pictures.

== 1917 ==
Release date	Title	Notes
June 23, 1917	On Trial	extant. Distribution
September 23, 1917	The Fall of the Romanoffs	lost. Distribution
December 3, 1917	Alimony	lost. Distribution
December 23, 1917	Daughter of Destiny	lost. Distribution

== 1918 ==
Release date	Title	Notes
February 1918	The Light Within	lost. Distribution
March 1918	The Sign Invisible	lost. Distribution
March 10, 1918	My Four Years in Germany	Distribution
April 2, 1918	Tarzan of the Apes	Distribution
April 14, 1918	A Dog's Life	Distribution
April 30, 1918	The Life Mask	lost. Distribution
May 21, 1918	Pershing's Crusaders	lost. Distribution
June 1, 1918	The Passing of the Third Floor Back	Distribution
June 23, 1918	Tempered Steel	lost.Distribution
July 6, 1918	Empty Pockets	lost. Distribution
October 1918	The Panther Woman	lost. Distribution
October 1, 1918	The Romance of Tarzan	lost. Distribution
December 29, 1918	Virtuous Wives	lost. Distribution

== 1919 ==
Release date	Title	Notes
January 19, 1919	The Fighting Roosevelts	lost. Distribution
January 19, 1919	Auction of Souls	incomplete. Distribution
March 10, 1919	A Midnight Romance	incomplete. Distribution
April 15, 1919	Whom the Gods Would Destroy	lost. Distribution
May 4, 1919	Mary Regan	Distribution
May 11, 1919	Daddy-Long-Legs	Distribution
May 11, 1919	The Price of Innocence	lost.Distribution
June 22, 1919	Bill Apperson's Boy	Distribution
August 24, 1919	Burglar by Proxy	Distribution
September 1, 1919	The Hoodlum	Distribution
September 14, 1919	A Temperamental Wife	Distribution
September 21, 1919	Her Kingdom of Dreams	lost. Distribution
September 29, 1919	Back to God's Country	Distribution
October 1919	In Wrong	Distribution
October 1919	The Thunderbolt	lost. Distribution
November 10, 1919	The Mind-the-Paint Girl	lost. Distribution
November 16, 1919	A Virtuous Vamp	Distribution
November 17, 1919	Heart o' the Hills	Distribution
December 15, 1919	In Old Kentucky	Distribution
December 28, 1919	The Greatest Question	Distribution
December 1, 1919	The Beauty Market	lost. Distribution

== 1920 ==
Release date	Title	Notes
January 6, 1920	A Daughter of Two Worlds	Distribution
January 15, 1920	Even as Eve	incomplete. Distribution
January 25, 1920	Two Weeks	incomplete, 2 reels remain missing Distribution
February 1920	The Turning Point	lost. Distribution
February 1, 1920	The River's End	Distribution
March 1920	Polly of the Storm Country	lost. Distribution
March 1920	The Inferior Sex	lost. Distribution
March 1, 1920	The Fighting Shepherdess	lost. Distribution
March 7, 1920	In Search of a Sinner	lost. Distribution
March 15, 1920	The Family Honor	Distribution
March 21, 1920	The Idol Dancer	Distribution
March 29, 1920	The Woman Gives	Distribution
April 1, 1920	Passion's Playground	lost. Distribution
April 18, 1920	Don't Ever Marry	Distribution
April 18, 1920	The Love Expert	Distribution
May 3, 1920	The Yellow Typhoon	lost. Distribution
June 15, 1920	Married Life	lost. Distribution
June 28, 1920	Yes or No?	Distribution
July 1920	The Perfect Woman	Distribution
July 18, 1920	Go and Get It	Distribution
August 1920	45 Minutes from Broadway	Production and distribution
August 1920	Good References	Distribution
August 1920	What Women Love	lost. Production and distribution
August 1920	The Woman in His House	lost. Distribution
August 2, 1920	Notorious Miss Lisle	lost. Distribution
August 16, 1920	The Jack-Knife Man	Distribution
September 12, 1920	The Master Mind	lost. Distribution
September 13, 1920	Harriet and the Piper	Distribution
September 13, 1920	The Kick in High Life	Distribution
September 26, 1920	A Splendid Hazard	lost. Distribution
October 1920	Curtain	lost. Distribution
October 1920	In the Heart of a Fool	lost. Distribution
October 4, 1920	The Branded Woman	Distribution
October 10, 1920	Peaceful Valley	lost. Distribution
October 31, 1920	Twin Beds	lost. Distribution
November 1920	Old Dad	lost. Distribution
November 1, 1920	Wet and Warmer	Distribution
November 22, 1920	Love, Honor and Behave	incomplete. Distribution
November 22, 1920	The Devil's Garden	lost. Distribution
November 28, 1920	Dangerous Business	lost. Distribution
November 29, 1920	Unseen Forces	Distribution
December 1920	The Truth About Husbands	Distribution
December 12, 1920	Passion	Distribution

== 1921 ==
Release date	Title	Notes
January 1921	Habit	lost. Distribution
January 1921	My Lady's Latchkey	lost. Distribution
January 1921	Not Guilty	lost. Distribution
January 6, 1921	The Great Adventure	Distribution
January 23, 1921	Mama's Affair	Distribution
February 6, 1921	The Kid	Distribution
February 27, 1921	The Old Swimmin' Hole	Distribution
March 1921	Scrambled Wives	lost. Distribution
March 23, 1921	Trust Your Wife	lost. Distribution
March 27, 1921	Man, Woman & Marriage	Distribution
April 1921	The Girl in the Taxi	Distribution
April 1, 1921	Jim the Penman	incomplete (reel 5 missing). Distribution
April 1, 1921	The Passion Flower	Distribution, though there is a bit of deterioration in the first scene and a "lapse of continuity" near the end of this copy
April 1, 1921	Sowing the Wind	Distribution
April 10, 1921	The Oath	lost. Distribution
April 17, 1921	The Sky Pilot	Distribution
April 24, 1921	Peck's Bad Boy	Distribution
May 1921	Courage	lost. Distribution
May 1921	Lessons in Love	incomplete, missing reel 3. Distribution
May 1921	Playthings of Destiny	lost. Distribution
May 1921	Scrap Iron	lost. Distribution
May 1921	The Sign on the Door	Distribution
May 1, 1921	Bob Hampton of Placer	lost. Distribution
May 8, 1921	Gypsy Blood	Distribution
June 1921	Love's Penalty	lost. Distribution
June 1921	Stranger than Fiction	lost. Distribution
June 17, 1921	Wedding Bells	lost. Distribution
June 26, 1921	Salvation Nell	Distribution
July 10, 1921	The Golden Snare	incomplete. Distribution
July 24, 1921	Nobody	lost. Distribution
August 1, 1921	Serenade	lost. Distribution
August 1, 1921	A Midnight Bell	lost. Distribution
August 20, 1921	The Child Thou Gavest Me	Distribution
September 12, 1921	Wife Against Wife	Distribution
September 25, 1921	One Arabian Night	Distribution
September 26, 1921	Bits of Life	lost. Distribution
October 10, 1921	The Invisible Fear	lost. Distribution
October 17, 1921	Two Minutes to Go	lost. Distribution
October 17, 1921	Woman's Place	lost. Distribution
October 24, 1921	Her Social Value	lost. Distribution
October 31, 1921	My Lady Friends	lost. Distribution
November 7, 1921	The Silent Call	lost. Distribution
November 7, 1921	The Wonderful Thing	lost. Distribution
November 20, 1921	Molly O'	lost. Distribution
November 21, 1921	Stardust	lost. Distribution
November 21, 1921	Tol'able David	Distribution
November 27, 1921	The Lotus Eater	lost. Distribution
December 1921	My Boy	Distribution
December 5, 1921	R.S.V.P.	Distribution
December 12, 1921	Her Mad Bargain	lost. Distribution
December 19, 1921	Love's Redemption	lost. Distribution
December 26, 1921	The Beautiful Liar	lost. Distribution
December 26, 1921	The Cave Girl	lost. Distribution

== 1922 ==
Release date	Title	Notes
January 1922	The Barnstormer	lost. Distribution
January 2, 1922	The Song of Life	Distribution
January 16, 1922	The Rosary	lost. Distribution
January 30, 1922	Polly of the Follies	lost. Distribution
February 6, 1922	The Seventh Day	lost. Distribution
February 6, 1922	Shattered Idols	Distribution
February 13, 1922	Red Hot Romance	incomplete. Distribution
February 13, 1922	Smilin' Through	Distribution
February 20, 1922	Penrod	lost. Distribution
February 27, 1922	Kindred of the Dust	Distribution
March 1922	Gas, Oil and Water	lost. Distribution
March 1922	A Question of Honor	lost. Distribution
March 1922	The Woman's Side	lost. Distribution
April 2, 1922	The Infidel	lost. Distribution
May 1922	The Deuce of Spades	Distribution
May 1922	One Clear Call	Distribution
May 1, 1922	The Woman He Married	lost. Distribution
May 15, 1922	The Primitive Lover	Distribution
May 22, 1922	Sonny	lost. Distribution
May 27, 1922	Fools First	lost. Distribution
June 1922	The Half Breed	lost. Distribution
June 4, 1922	Domestic Relations	lost. Distribution
June 22, 1922	The Crossroads of New York	lost. Distribution
July 1922	Alias Julius Caesar	lost. Distribution
July 1922	Hurricane's Gal	Distribution
July 1922	The Masquerader	lost. Distribution
July 1922	Smudge	Distribution
July 1922	Rose o' the Sea	lost. Distribution
August 7, 1922	Trouble	Distribution
August 21, 1922	Heroes and Husbands	lost. Distribution
September 1, 1922	Skin Deep	Distribution
September 1, 1922	The Light in the Dark	Distribution
September 17, 1922	The Eternal Flame	incomplete. Distribution
October 1922	White Shoulders	lost. Distribution
October 1, 1922	Lorna Doone	Distribution
October 8, 1922	The Bond Boy	lost. Distribution
October 15, 1922	East Is West	Distribution
October 30, 1922	Oliver Twist	Distribution
November 1, 1922	Brawn of the North	lost. Distribution
December 1922	Omar the Tentmaker	lost. Distribution
December 1922	The Woman Conquers	lost. Distribution
December 4, 1922	Minnie	lost. Distribution
December 25, 1922	The Hottentot	incomplete. Distribution

== 1923 ==
Release date	Title	Notes
January 1, 1923	Fury	lost. Distribution
January 19, 1923	Bell Boy 13	Distribution
January 23, 1923	Money! Money! Money!	lost. Distribution
January 28, 1923	The Voice from the Minaret	lost. Distribution
February 4, 1923	What a Wife Learned	Distribution
February 4, 1923	The Dangerous Age	lost. Distribution
February 12, 1923	Mighty Lak' a Rose	lost. Distribution
February 26, 1923	The Pilgrim	Distribution
March 5, 1923	Scars of Jealousy	Distribution
March 12, 1923	Refuge	lost. Distribution
March 18, 1923	The Isle of Lost Ships	lost. Distribution
March 26, 1923	Daddy	Distribution
April 16, 1923	Slander the Woman	lost. Distribution
April 22, 1923	The Bright Shawl	Distribution
April 23, 1923	The Sunshine Trail	lost. Distribution
April 30, 1923	Within the Law	Distribution
May 3, 1923	The Girl of the Golden West	lost. Production and distribution
May 7, 1923	The Lonely Road	lost. Distribution
June 3, 1923	A Man of Action	Distribution
June 4, 1923	Children of Dust	lost. Distribution
June 11, 1923	Slippy McGee	lost. Distribution
June 18, 1923	Penrod and Sam	Distribution
July 1, 1923	Wandering Daughters	lost. Distribution
July 15, 1923	The Scarlet Lily	lost. Distribution
July 22, 1923	The Brass Bottle	lost. Distribution
July 29, 1923	Trilby	Distribution
July 30, 1923	Circus Days	Distribution
August 20, 1923	The Huntress	lost. Distribution
August 27, 1923	Dulcy	lost. Distribution
September 1923	The Age of Desire	lost. Distribution
September 1923	Her Reputation	lost. Distribution
September 1, 1923	The Broad Road	lost. Distribution
September 10, 1923	The Fighting Blade	Distribution
September 16, 1923	Potash and Perlmutter	lost. Distribution
October 1, 1923	Ashes of Vengeance	Distribution
October 8, 1923	The Bad Man	lost. Distribution
October 15, 1923	Thundergate	Distribution
October 22, 1923	The Meanest Man in the World	lost. Distribution
October 29, 1923	Ponjola	Distribution
November 12, 1923	Flaming Youth	incomplete; 1 reel survives. Production and distribution
November 12, 1923	Jealous Husbands	lost. Distribution
November 19, 1923	The Dangerous Maid	Distribution
November 26, 1923	The Wanters	lost. Distribution
November 28, 1923	Anna Christie	Distribution
December 17, 1923	The Eternal City	incomplete. Distribution
December 17, 1923	Twenty-One	lost. Distribution
December 23, 1923	Her Temporary Husband	lost. Distribution
December 24, 1923	The Song of Love	Distribution
December 29, 1923	Black Oxen	Distribution
December 30, 1923	Boy of Mine	lost Distribution
December 31, 1923	Chastity	lost. Distribution

== 1924 ==
Release date	Title	Notes
January 1924	Painted People	lost. Distribution
January 21, 1924	Abraham Lincoln	incomplete. Distribution
February 1924	The Love Master	Distribution
February 3, 1924	When a Man's a Man	incomplete. Distribution
February 25, 1924	Torment	lost. Distribution
February 29, 1924	Lilies of the Field	trailer survives. Distribution
March 1, 1924	Flowing Gold	Distribution
March 3, 1924	Why Men Leave Home	Distribution
March 10, 1924	The Galloping Fish	Distribution
March 24, 1924	The Enchanted Cottage	Production and distribution
March 24, 1924	Secrets	Distribution
March 30, 1924	The Goldfish	incomplete. Distribution
April 5, 1924	The Marriage Cheat	fragment. Distribution
April 13, 1924	A Son of the Sahara	trailer survives. Distribution
April 20, 1924	The Woman on the Jury	lost. Production and distribution
April 27, 1924	Those Who Dance	lost. Distribution
May 4, 1924	Cytherea	lost. Distribution
May 11, 1924	The White Moth	Distribution
May 25, 1924	The Perfect Flapper	Production and distribution
June 14, 1924	The Sea Hawk	Distribution
June 15, 1924	For Sale	lost. Production and distribution
June 29, 1924	A Self-Made Failure	trailer survives. Distribution
July 20, 1924	The Girl in the Limousine	lost. Distribution
July 27, 1924	Single Wives	Distribution
August 1924	Tarnish	lost. Distribution
September 1, 1924	In Hollywood with Potash and Perlmutter	lost. Distribution
September 28, 1924	In Every Woman's Life	lost. Distribution
October 1, 1924	Her Night of Romance	Distribution
October 5, 1924	The Silent Watcher	lost. Distribution
October 12, 1924	Christine of the Hungry Heart	fragment. Distribution
October 19, 1924	Madonna of the Streets	lost. Distribution
October 26, 1924	The Only Woman	there are reports of decomposition on half a reel if not preserved by now. Distribution
November 2, 1924	Husbands and Lovers	Distribution
November 23, 1924	Classmates	lost. Distribution
November 30, 1924	Inez from Hollywood	lost. Distribution
December 7, 1924	Born Rich	Distribution
December 14, 1924	Love's Wilderness	fragment. Distribution
December 21, 1924	Idle Tongues	lost. Distribution
December 28, 1924	So Big	trailer survives. Production and distribution

== 1925 ==
Release date	Title	Notes
January 4, 1925	Flaming Love	lost. Distribution
January 11, 1925	As Man Desires	lost. Production and distribution
January 18, 1925	A Thief in Paradise	fragment. Distribution
January 25, 1925	The Lady	incomplete. Distribution
January 25, 1925	Learning to Love	incomplete. Distribution
February 1, 1925	Enticement	lost. Distribution
February 2, 1925	The Lost World	Production and distribution
February 15, 1925	If I Marry Again	lost. Production and distribution
February 22, 1925	Her Husband's Secret	lost. Distribution
March 1, 1925	New Toys	lost. Distribution
March 15, 1925	The Heart of a Siren	Distribution
March 15, 1925	One Year to Live	lost. Production and distribution
March 22, 1925	Déclassée	Distribution
March 22, 1925	I Want My Man	lost. Distribution
March 29, 1925	Sally	lost. Production and distribution
April 12, 1925	His Supreme Moment	lost. Distribution
April 12, 1925	One Way Street	lost. Production and distribution
April 30, 1925	Playing with Souls	lost. Distribution
May 3, 1925	Soul-Fire	Distribution
May 10, 1925	Chickie	lost. Production and distribution
May 17, 1925	The Necessary Evil	lost. Production and distribution
May 24, 1925	The Talker	lost. Production and distribution
June 7, 1925	The White Monkey	incomplete; reel 3 missing . Distribution
June 16, 1925	Just a Woman	lost. Production and distribution
June 21, 1925	The Desert Flower	lost. Distribution
June 21, 1925	The Making of O'Malley	incomplete, One Reel Only. Production and distribution
July 12, 1925	The Lady Who Lied	lost. Production and distribution
July 19, 1925	The Marriage Whirl	lost. Distribution
July 26, 1925	The Scarlet West	trailer survives. Distribution
August 2, 1925	Her Sister from Paris	Distribution
August 9, 1925	Fine Clothes	lost. Distribution
August 16, 1925	The Half-Way Girl	lost. Production and distribution
August 16, 1925	Winds of Chance	Production and distribution
August 23, 1925	The Knockout	trailer survives. Distribution
August 30, 1925	Graustark	incomplete. Distribution
September 1925	Sandra	Trailer Survives. Distribution
September 6, 1925	Shore Leave	Distribution
September 13, 1925	What Fools Men	lost. Production and distribution
September 20, 1925	The Live Wire	incomplete. Distribution
September 27, 1925	The Dark Angel	incomplete. One reel only. Distribution
October 4, 1925	The Pace That Thrills	lost. Production and distribution
October 5, 1925	The Silent Watcher	lost. Production and distribution
October 11, 1925	Classified	Distribution
October 18, 1925	The Pace That Thrills	lost. Production and distribution
October 18, 1925	Why Women Love	lost. Distribution
October 25, 1925	The Beautiful City	lost. Distribution
November 1, 1925	The New Commandment	lost. Distribution
November 8, 1925	Scarlet Saint	lost. Production and distribution
November 15, 1925	We Moderns	lost. Distribution
November 22, 1925	The Unguarded Hour	lost. Production and distribution
November 25, 1925	Clothes Make the Pirate	trailer survives. Distribution
December 6, 1925	The Splendid Road	lost. Distribution
December 13, 1925	Joanna	lost. Distribution
December 27, 1925	Infatuation	lost. Distribution

== 1926 ==
Release date	Title	Notes
January 3, 1926	Too Much Money	lost. Production and distribution
January 10, 1926	Just Suppose	Distribution
January 13, 1926	Bluebeard's Seven Wives	lost. Production and distribution
January 24, 1926	The Reckless Lady	lost. Distribution
January 31, 1926	The Girl from Montmartre	Distribution
February 1, 1926	Memory Lane	Distribution
February 7, 1926	Rainbow Riley	fragment. Distribution
February 14, 1926	The Far Cry	lost. Production and distribution
February 21, 1926	Irene	Production and distribution
February 28, 1926	The Dancer of Paris	fragments and a trailer survive. Production and distribution
March 14, 1926	High Steppers	lost. Distribution
March 21, 1926	Mademoiselle Modiste	lost. Distribution
March 21, 1926	Tramp, Tramp, Tramp	Distribution
March 28, 1926	Her Second Chance	lost. Production
April 4, 1926	Kiki	Distribution
April 11, 1926	Old Loves and New	lost. Distribution
May 2, 1926	The Greater Glory	fragment. Production and distribution
May 16, 1926	The Wilderness Woman	lost. Distribution
May 23, 1926	The Wise Guy	Distribution
May 30, 1926	Ranson's Folly	Distribution
June 6, 1926	Ella Cinders	Distribution
June 13, 1926	Sweet Daddies	lost. Production and distribution
June 17, 1926	The Sporting Lover	lost. Distribution
June 20, 1926	Puppets	lost. Distribution
June 27, 1926	Miss Nobody	lost. Production and distribution
July 4, 1926	The Brown Derby	Distribution
July 11, 1926	Men of Steel	lost. Production and distribution
July 11, 1926	The Savage	lost. Production and distribution
July 25, 1926	The Great Deception	lost. Distribution
July 26, 1926	Mismates	lost. Production and distribution
August 1, 1926	Señor Daredevil	lost. Distribution
August 8, 1926	Into Her Kingdom	lost. Distribution
August 8, 1926	Pals First	lost. Distribution
August 15, 1926	The Amateur Gentleman	Distribution
August 22, 1926	It Must Be Love	lost. Distribution
September 4, 1926	Don Juan's Three Nights	Distribution
September 5, 1926	The Duchess of Buffalo	Distribution
September 5, 1926	The Strong Man	Distribution
September 12, 1926	Subway Sadie	lost. Distribution
September 26, 1926	Paradise	lost. Distribution
October 17, 1926	The Prince of Tempters	Distribution
October 17, 1926	Forever After	Production and distribution
October 25, 1926	Midnight Lovers	Distribution
October 31, 1926	Syncopating Sue	lost. Distribution
November 14, 1926	Stepping Along	lost. Distribution
November 14, 1926	The Unknown Cavalier	lost. Distribution
November 15, 1926	Ladies at Play	lost. Production and distribution
November 20, 1926	The Blonde Saint	incomplete. Distribution
November 21, 1926	The Silent Lover	Production and distribution
November 28, 1926	Twinkletoes	Distribution
December 12, 1926	Just Another Blonde	reels 5 of 6 very incomplete. Distribution
December 12, 1926	The White Black Sheep	lost. Distribution

== 1927 ==
Release date	Title	Notes
January 1, 1927	The Lady in Ermine	lost. Distribution
January 2, 1927	The Lunatic at Large	lost. Production and distribution
January 16, 1927	The Masked Woman	lost. Production and distribution
January 23, 1927	The Perfect Sap	lost. Distribution
January 31, 1927	The Overland Stage	lost. Distribution
February 6, 1927	McFadden's Flats	lost. Production and distribution
February 13, 1927	An Affair of the Follies	lost. Distribution
February 20, 1927	Easy Pickings	Production and distribution
February 27, 1927	The Sea Tiger	lost. Production and distribution
March 5, 1927	Three Hours	Distribution
March 6, 1927	Orchids and Ermine	Distribution
March 13, 1927	High Hat	Distribution
March 20, 1927	Venus of Venice	last reel lost. Production and distribution
March 26, 1927	Long Pants	Distribution
March 27, 1927	The Notorious Lady	Distribution
April 3, 1927	Somewhere in Sonora	incomplete; reel 2 missing. Distribution
April 17, 1927	See You in Jail	Distribution
April 21, 1927	Camille	incomplete. Distribution
April 24, 1927	Convoy	lost. Distribution
May 1, 1927	All Aboard	lost. Distribution
May 1, 1927	The Tender Hour	Distribution
May 15, 1927	Broadway Nights	lost. Distribution
May 22, 1927	Babe Comes Home	lost. Production and distribution
May 29, 1927	Lost at the Front	lost. Distribution
June 5, 1927	The Land Beyond the Law	lost. Distribution
June 5, 1927	The Sunset Derby	lost. Production and distribution
June 12, 1927	Dance Magic	lost. Distribution
June 19, 1927	Framed	lost. Production and distribution
June 26, 1927	Naughty but Nice	Distribution
July 3, 1927	Lonesome Ladies	lost. Production and distribution
July 9, 1927	The Prince of Headwaiters	lost. Distribution
July 10, 1927	The Devil's Saddle	lost. Distribution
July 24, 1927	White Pants Willie	lost. Distribution
July 31, 1927	For the Love of Mike	lost. Distribution
August 7, 1927	The Poor Nut	lost. Distribution
August 14, 1927	The Stolen Bride	Production and distribution
August 21, 1927	Hard-Boiled Haggerty	lost. Production and distribution
August 28, 1927	Three's a Crowd	Distribution
September 1, 1927	The Patent Leather Kid	Production and distribution
September 3, 1927	The Life of Riley	lost. Production and distribution
September 11, 1927	Smile, Brother, Smile	Distribution
September 25, 1927	The Drop Kick	Production and distribution
September 25, 1927	Rose of the Golden West	Production and distribution
September 27, 1927	The Red Raiders	Distribution
October 9, 1927	American Beauty	lost. Production and distribution
October 16, 1927	The Crystal Cup	lost. Distribution
October 23, 1927	Breakfast at Sunrise	Distribution
October 30, 1927	No Place to Go	in need of restoration. Distribution
November 6, 1927	Gun Gospel	Distribution
November 13, 1927	The Gorilla	Production and distribution
November 20, 1927	Home Made	lost. Distribution
November 27, 1927	Man Crazy	lost. Distribution
December 4, 1927	A Texas Steer	lost. Production and distribution
December 4, 1927	The Valley of the Giants	Production and distribution
December 9, 1927	The Private Life of Helen of Troy	incomplete. Production and distribution
December 10, 1927	French Dressing	lost. Production and distribution
December 18, 1927	The Love Mart	lost. Production and distribution
December 25, 1927	Her Wild Oat	Production and distribution

== 1928 ==
Release date	Title	Notes
January 1, 1928	The Shepherd of the Hills	Lost.
January 22, 1928	Sailors' Wives	Lost. Production and distribution
January 29, 1928	The Noose	Production and distribution
February 5, 1928	The Whip Woman	Lost. Production and distribution
February 12, 1928	The Chaser	Lost. Distribution Only.
February 19, 1928	The Wagon Show	Lost. Production and distribution
February 26, 1928	Flying Romeos	Lost. Production and distribution
March 4, 1928	Mad Hour	Lost. Production and distribution
March 11, 1928	Burning Daylight	Production and distribution
March 18, 1928	The Heart of a Follies Girl	Lost. Production and distribution
March 25, 1928	The Big Noise	Lost. Production and distribution
April 1, 1928	Ladies' Night in a Turkish Bath	Synchronized sound film Production and distribution
April 8, 1928	The Little Shepherd of Kingdom Come	Lost. Production and distribution
April 15, 1928	Chinatown Charlie	Unclear. Production and distribution
April 22, 1928	The Canyon of Adventure	Lost. Distribution
April 29, 1928	Harold Teen	Production and distribution
May 6, 1928	Lady Be Good	Lost. Production and distribution
May 13, 1928	Vamping Venus	Lost. Production and distribution
May 20, 1928	The Yellow Lily	Production and distribution
May 27, 1928	The Hawk's Nest	Lost. Production and distribution
June 3, 1928	The Upland Rider	Lost. Production and distribution
June 10, 1928	Three-Ring Marriage	Lost. Production and distribution
June 17, 1928	Wheel of Chance	Lost. Production and distribution
June 24, 1928	Happiness Ahead	Lost. Production and distribution
July 1, 1928	The Code of the Scarlet	Lost. Distribution
July 8, 1928	The Good-Bye Kiss	Synchronized sound film Lost. Distribution
July 8, 1928	The Head Man	Lost. Production and distribution
July 22, 1928	Heart to Heart	Production and distribution
August 5, 1928	The Wright Idea	Lost.
August 12, 1928	Heart Trouble	Lost. Distribution Only.
August 12, 1928	The Strange Case of Captain Ramper	Lost. Distribution Only.
August 19, 1928	Out of the Ruins	Production and distribution
August 26, 1928	Oh, Kay!	Production and distribution
August 27, 1928	The Butter and Egg Man	Production and distribution
September 9, 1928	The Night Watch	Synchronized sound film Production and distribution
September 16, 1928	Waterfront	Synchronized sound film Production and distribution
September 16, 1928	The Whip	Synchronized sound film Production and distribution
September 23, 1928	Show Girl	Synchronized sound film Production and distribution
October 7, 1928	The Crash	Synchronized sound film Lost. Production and distribution
October 14, 1928	Do Your Duty	Lost. Production and distribution
October 18, 1928	Lilac Time	Synchronized sound film Production and distribution
October 21, 1928	The Companionate Marriage	Lost. Distribution Only.
October 28, 1928	The Glorious Trail	Lost.
November 4, 1928	The Haunted House	Synchronized sound film Production and distribution
November 11, 1928	Outcast	Synchronized sound film Production and distribution
December 2, 1928	Adoration	Synchronized sound film Production and distribution
December 5, 1928	The Barker	Part-Talkie sound film Production and distribution
December 16, 1928	Naughty Baby	Synchronized sound film Production and distribution
December 23, 1928	The Phantom City	Lost. Production and distribution
December 26, 1928	The Ware Case	Lost. Distribution Only.
December 29, 1928	Scarlet Seas	Synchronized sound film Production and distribution

== 1929 ==
Release date	Title	Notes
January 6, 1929	Synthetic Sin	Synchronized sound film Production and distribution
January 13, 1929	Dancing Vienna	Synchronized sound film Distribution Only.
February 2, 1929	Cheyenne	Synchronized sound film Production and distribution
February 10, 1929	Weary River	Part-Talkie sound film Production and distribution
February 17, 1929	The Lawless Legion	Synchronized sound film Lost. Production and distribution
February 17, 1929	The Royal Rider	Synchronized sound film Lost. Production and distribution
February 17, 1929	Seven Footprints to Satan	Synchronized sound film Production and distribution
March 3, 1929	Children of the Ritz	Synchronized sound film Lost. Production and distribution
March 12, 1929	Why Be Good?	Synchronized sound film Production and distribution
March 24, 1929	Love and the Devil	Synchronized sound film Production and distribution
March 31, 1929	The Divine Lady	Synchronized sound film Production and distribution
April 2, 1929	His Captive Woman	Part-Talkie sound film Production and distribution
April 7, 1929	The California Mail	Production and distribution
April 14, 1929	Saturday's Children	Part-Talkie sound film Lost. Production and distribution
April 28, 1929	The House of Horror	Part-Talkie sound film Lost. Production and distribution
May 5, 1929	Hot Stuff	Part-Talkie sound film Lost. Production and distribution
May 8, 1929	The Squall	All-Talking sound film Production and distribution
May 12, 1929	Two Weeks Off	Part-Talkie sound film Production and distribution
May 19, 1929	Prisoners	Part-Talkie sound film Lost. Production and distribution
June 2, 1929	Careers	All-Talking sound film Production and distribution
June 21, 1929	Broadway Babies	All-Talking sound film Production and distribution
June 23, 1929	The Girl in the Glass Cage	Part-Talkie sound film Lost. Production and distribution
July 7, 1929	The Man and the Moment	Part-Talkie sound film Production and distribution
July 14, 1929	Twin Beds	All-Talking sound film Production and distribution
July 20, 1929	Drag	All-Talking sound film Production and distribution
July 28, 1929	Smiling Irish Eyes	All-Talking sound film Technicolor Sequences; Lost. Production and distribution
August 4, 1929	Hard to Get	All-Talking sound film Lost. Production and distribution
August 11, 1929	Dark Streets	All-Talking sound film Lost. Production and distribution
August 18, 1929	The Careless Age	All-Talking sound film Production and distribution
August 25, 1929	Her Private Life	All-Talking sound film Production and distribution
September 1, 1929	Fast Life	All-Talking sound film Lost. Production and distribution
September 15, 1929	The Great Divide	All-Talking sound film Production and distribution
September 22, 1929	A Most Immoral Lady	All-Talking sound film Production and distribution
October 1, 1929	Young Nowheres	All-Talking sound film Lost. Production and distribution
October 25, 1929	The Isle of Lost Ships	All-Talking sound film Production and distribution
October 27, 1929	The Girl from Woolworth's	All-Talking sound film Lost. Production and distribution
November 4, 1929	Paris	All-Talking sound film Technicolor Sequences; Fragment. Production and distribution
November 8, 1929	Footlights and Fools	All-Talking sound film Technicolor Sequences; Lost. Production and distribution
November 10, 1929	The Forward Pass	All-Talking sound film Lost. Production and distribution
November 17, 1929	Little Johnny Jones	All-Talking sound film Lost. Production and distribution
December 1, 1929	The Painted Angel	All-Talking sound film Lost. Production and distribution
December 8, 1929	The Love Racket	All-Talking sound film Lost. Production and distribution
December 23, 1929	Sally	All-Talking sound film All-Technicolor; Production and distribution
December 29, 1929	Wedding Rings	All-Talking sound film Lost. Production and distribution

== Films as a Warner Bros. subsidiary ==
As a subsidiary of Warner Bros., First National Pictures, Inc., continued to be a copyright claimant and trademark on motion pictures until 1936.

=== 1930 ===
Release date	Title	Notes
January 5, 1930	Lilies of the Field	Lost.
January 19, 1930	Playing Around	
January 26, 1930	In the Next Room	Lost.
February 2, 1930	Loose Ankles	
February 9, 1930	The Other Tomorrow	Lost.
February 16, 1930	No, No, Nanette	Part Technicolor; Lost.
March 2, 1930	Strictly Modern	Lost.
March 9, 1930	Son of the Gods	Part Technicolor; Extant only in black and white.
March 16, 1930	The Furies	Lost.
April 6, 1930	Murder Will Out	Lost.
April 13, 1930	Spring Is Here	
April 20, 1930	Showgirl in Hollywood	Part Technicolor; Extant only in black and white.
May 4, 1930	A Notorious Affair	
May 11, 1930	The Flirting Widow	
May 25, 1930	Song of the Flame	All Technicolor; Lost.
June 1, 1930	Back Pay	
June 15, 1930	Sweethearts and Wives	
June 22, 1930	Bride of the Regiment	All Technicolor; Lost.
July 6, 1930	Sweet Mama	
July 20, 1930	Road to Paradise	
August 6, 1930	Numbered Men	
August 10, 1930	The Dawn Patrol	
August 24, 1930	Top Speed	
September 7, 1930	The Way of All Men	Lost.
September 15, 1930	The Bad Man	Unpreserved nitrate print at UCLA; in danger of being lost.
September 21, 1930	Bright Lights	All Technicolor; Extant only in black and white (color fragments at LOC).
September 28, 1930	Scarlet Pages	
October 5, 1930	College Lovers	Lost.
October 12, 1930	The Girl of the Golden West	Lost.
October 19, 1930	The Truth About Youth	
October 30, 1930	Kismet	Lost.
November 2, 1930	The Gorilla	Lost.
November 9, 1930	Sunny	
November 23, 1930	The Widow from Chicago	
November 30, 1930	One Night at Susie's	
December 7, 1930	Mothers Cry	
December 14, 1930	The Lash	
December 21, 1930	Going Wild	

=== 1931 ===
Release date	Title	Notes
January 9, 1931	Little Caesar	Inducted into the National Film Registry in 2000.
January 11, 1931	The Naughty Flirt	
February 7, 1931	The Right of Way	
February 21, 1931	Kiss Me Again	All Technicolor; Extant only in black and white.
March 7, 1931	Father's Son	
March 28, 1931	The Hot Heiress	
April 4, 1931	Woman Hungry	All Technicolor; Lost.
April 11, 1931	The Finger Points	
April 18, 1931	Misbehaving Ladies	
May 8, 1931	Too Young to Marry	
May 29, 1931	The Lady Who Dared	
June 6, 1931	Party Husband	
June 20, 1931	Men of the Sky	Lost.
July 4, 1931	Big Business Girl	
July 18, 1931	Chances	
August 1, 1931	Broadminded	
August 15, 1931	The Reckless Hour	
August 29, 1931	The Last Flight	
September 5, 1931	The Bargain	
September 12, 1931	I Like Your Nerve	
September 26, 1931	Five Star Final	Nominee of the Academy Award for Best Picture
October 3, 1931	Penrod and Sam	
October 17, 1931	Honor of the Family	Lost.
October 31, 1931	The Ruling Voice	
November 28, 1931	Local Boy Makes Good	
December 5, 1931	Compromised	Lost.
December 12, 1931	Safe in Hell	
December 26, 1931	Her Majesty, Love	

=== 1932 ===
Release date	Title	Notes
January 9, 1932	The Woman from Monte Carlo	
January 14, 1932	Union Depot	
February 6, 1932	The Hatchet Man	
February 20, 1932	Fireman, Save My Child	
March 26, 1932	Alias the Doctor	
April 2, 1932	It's Tough to Be Famous	
May 14, 1932	The Famous Ferguson Case	
May 21, 1932	The Rich Are Always with Us	
May 23, 1932	The Tenderfoot	
May 28, 1932	The Strange Love of Molly Louvain	
May 28, 1932	Two Seconds	
June 8, 1932	The Dark Horse	
June 18, 1932	Love Is a Racket	
June 18, 1932	Week-End Marriage	
July 30, 1932	Miss Pinkerton	
August 20, 1932	Crooner	
August 27, 1932	Doctor X	All Technicolor
September 10, 1932	Life Begins	
September 24, 1932	Tiger Shark	
October 9, 1932	The Crash	
October 15, 1932	The Cabin in the Cotton	
October 29, 1932	Three on a Match	
November 5, 1932	They Call It Sin	
December 8, 1932	You Said a Mouthful	
December 10, 1932	Central Park	
December 24, 1932	20,000 Years in Sing Sing	
December 24, 1932	Silver Dollar	
December 30, 1932	Frisco Jenny	
December 31, 1932	The Match King	

=== 1933 ===
Release date	Title	Notes
February 11, 1933	Employees' Entrance	Inducted into the National Film Registry in 2019
March 1, 1933	Blondie Johnson	
March 18, 1933	Grand Slam	
April 1, 1933	The Mind Reader	
April 15, 1933	Central Airport	
April 29, 1933	Elmer, the Great	
May 13, 1933	Lilly Turner	
May 20, 1933	The Little Giant	
June 17, 1933	Heroes for Sale	
July 15, 1933	She Had to Say Yes	
September 9, 1933	Goodbye Again	
September 16, 1933	Bureau of Missing Persons	
September 23, 1933	I Loved a Woman	
October 7, 1933	Wild Boys of the Road	Inducted into the National Film Registry in 2013
November 11, 1933	Female	
November 18, 1933	Havana Widows	
November 25, 1933	The World Changes	
December 14, 1933	Convention City	Lost.
December 23, 1933	Son of a Sailor	

=== 1934 ===
Release date	Title	Notes
January 6, 1934	The Big Shakedown	
January 20, 1934	Massacre	
January 27, 1934	Bedside	
February 3, 1934	Dark Hazard	
February 10, 1934	Mandalay	
February 14, 1934	Fashions of 1934	
March 10, 1934	Journal of a Crime	
March 17, 1934	Wonder Bar	
April 7, 1934	Registered Nurse	
May 26, 1934	Twenty Million Sweethearts	
May 26, 1934	The Merry Frinks	
June 2, 1934	Fog Over Frisco	
June 30, 1934	The Circus Clown	
July 7, 1934	Return of the Terror	Prequel to The Terror (1928)
July 14, 1934	Midnight Alibi	
July 14, 1934	Side Streets	
August 4, 1934	The Man with Two Faces	
August 25, 1934	The Dragon Murder Case	
September 15, 1934	British Agent	
September 22, 1934	The Case of the Howling Dog	
October 20, 1934	6 Day Bike Rider	
October 20, 1934	I Sell Anything	
October 27, 1934	Happiness Ahead	
November 17, 1934	Gentlemen Are Born	
November 28, 1934	Flirtation Walk	
December 8, 1934	Babbitt	
December 15, 1934	The Church Mouse	
December 15, 1934	Murder In The Clouds	

=== 1935 ===
Release date	Title	Notes
January 12, 1935	Maybe It's Love	
February 2, 1935	Red Hot Tires	
February 16, 1935	The Woman In Red	
March 2, 1935	Living on Velvet	
March 9, 1935	While the Patient Slept	
March 15, 1935	Gold Diggers of 1935	
March 28, 1935	Traveling Saleslady	
April 13, 1935	The Case of the Curious Bride	
April 20, 1935	Go into Your Dance	
April 27, 1935	Mary Jane's Pa	
May 4, 1935	G Men	
May 18, 1935	Black Fury	
May 25, 1935	In Caliente	
June 8, 1935	Oil for the Lamps of China	
August 3, 1935	The Irish in Us	
October 12, 1935	Shipmates Forever	
December 7, 1935	Broadway Hostess	

=== 1936 ===
Release date	Title	Notes
January 11, 1936	The Murder of Dr. Harrigan	
February 28, 1936	Song of the Saddle	
March 28, 1936	Road Gang	
April 4, 1936	Snowed Under	
April 11, 1936	The Singing Kid	
April 18, 1936	Brides Are Like That	
April 25, 1936	I Married a Doctor	
May 16, 1936	The Law in Her Hands	
May 23, 1936	The Golden Arrow	
June 6, 1936	Bullets or Ballots	
June 13, 1936	Murder by an Aristocrat	
July 4, 1936	The White Angel	
July 11, 1936	Two Against the World	
July 24, 1936	Earthworm Tractors	
August 15, 1936	The Case of the Velvet Claws	
August 22, 1936	China Clipper	
September 5, 1936	Trailin' West	
September 18, 1936	Down the Stretch	
October 24, 1936	Here Comes Carter	
October 31, 1936	The Case of the Black Cat	
November 14, 1936	The Captain's Kid	
