= Edmund Breese =

American actor (1871–1936)

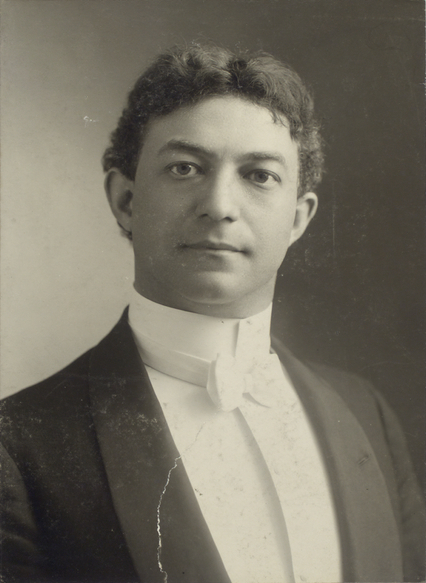
- Portrait of Breese by Elmer Chickering
- Born: June 18, 1871; Brooklyn, New York, U.S.
- Died: 6 April 1936 (aged 64); New York City, U.S.
- Occupations: Stage, film actor
- Years active: 1892–1936 (stage); 1914–1935 (film)
- Spouses: Genevieve Landry; Harriet Beach

Edmund Breese (June 18, 1871 – April 6, 1936) was an American stage and film actor of the silent era.

== Biography ==
Breese was born in Brooklyn, New York. His parents were Renshaw Breese and Josephine Busby.

The Opera House in Eureka Springs, Arkansas, was the site of Breese's stage debut in the summer of 1895. He portrayed Adonis Evergreen in My Awful Dad.

Long on the stage with a varied Broadway career before entering films, Breese appeared with James O'Neill in The Count of Monte Cristo (1893), The Lion and the Mouse (1906) with Richard Bennett, The Third Degree (1909) with Helen Ware, The Master Mind (1913) with Elliott Dexter, the popular World War I era play Why Marry? (1917) with Estelle Winwood & Nat C. Goodwin and So This Is London (1922) with Donald Gallaher. He also acted in a stock company at the Castle Square Theatre in Boston.

Breese's film career began in 1914 with the Edison Studios. He appeared in more than 120 films between 1914 and 1935. He is best remembered as the advice-giving German businessman at the beginning of the war film All Quiet on the Western Front.

His final role was on stage in Night of January 16th from September 1935 to April 1936. Just before the play ended its run, Breese developed peritonitis, from which he died on April 6, 1936 at the Hospital for the Ruptured and Crippled. Funeral services were at the Church of the Transfiguration in New York City on April 8, 1936, after which his body was cremated.

Breese's first wife was Genevieve Landry. At the time of his death, he was married to Harriet Beach.

== Selected filmography ==
- The Master Mind (1914) as Richard Allen
- The Walls of Jericho (1914) as Jack Frobisher
- The Shooting of Dan McGrew (1915) as Jim Maxwell
- The Song of the Wage Slave (1915) as Ned Lane
- The Lure of Heart's Desire (1916) as Jim Carew
- The Spell of the Yukon (1916) as Jim Carson
- The Weakness of Strength (1916) as Daniel Gaynor
- Someone Must Pay (1919)
- His Temporary Wife (1920) as Judge Laton
- Chains of Evidence (1920) as Judge Frank Sturgis
- A Common Level (1920) as Matthew Ryan
- Burn 'Em Up Barnes (1921) as King Cole
- Beyond the Rainbow (1922) as Insp. Richardson
- Sure Fire Flint (1922) as Johnny Jetts
- The Curse of Drink (1922) as John Rand
- Jacqueline (1923) as Edmund MacDonald
- Luck (1923) as Alan Crosby
- The Little Red Schoolhouse (1923) as Brent
- You Are Guilty (1923) as Judge Elkins
- Bright Lights of Broadway (1923) as Reverend Graham Drake
- Marriage Morals (1923) as Harry's Father
- The Fair Cheat (1923) as Morgan Van Dam
- Three O'Clock in the Morning (1923) as Mr. Winthrop
- Restless Wives (1924) as Hobart Richards
- Damaged Hearts (1924) as Innkeeper
- The Sixth Commandment (1924) as Col. Saunders
- The Speed Spook (1924) as Chuck Brady
- Those Who Judge (1924) as Henry Dawson
- Playthings of Desire (1924) as Governor Cabbot
- The Early Bird (1925) as The Great La Tour
- Wildfire (1925) as Sen. Woodhurst
- The Police Patrol (1925) as Tony Rocco
- The Live Wire (1925) as Sawdust Sam
- Womanhandled (1925) as Uncle Lester
- The Highbinders (1926) as Mike Harrigan
- The Brown Derby (1926) as John J. Caldwell
- Stepping Along (1926) as Prince Ferdinand Darowitsky
- Paradise for Two (1927) as Uncle Howard
- Back to Liberty (1927) as Tom Devon / Reginald Briand
- Home Made (1927) as Mr. Tilford
- Finders Keepers (1928) as Col. Hastings
- Burning Daylight (1928) as John Dossett
- The Perfect Crime (1928) as Wilmot
- The Wright Idea (1928) as Mr. Filbert
- The Haunted House (1928) as Uncle Herbert
- On Trial (1928) as Judge
- Conquest (1928) as William Holden
- Fancy Baggage (1929) as John Hardin
- Sonny Boy (1929) as Thorpe
- Girls Gone Wild (1929) as Judge Elliott
- From Headquarters (1929) Bit Part (uncredited)
- The Gamblers (1929) Bit Part (uncredited)
- Girl Overboard (1929) as Jim Keefe
- The Hottentot (1929) as Ollie
- In the Headlines (1929) as Eddy
- Hold Everything (1930) as Pop O'Keefe
- All Quiet on the Western Front (1930) as Herr Meyer, the Stammtisch speaker
- The Czar of Broadway (1930) as McNab
- Rough Waters (1930) as Captain Thomas
- The Sea Bat (1930) as Maddocks
- Top Speed (1930) as Spencer Colgate
- Bright Lights (1930) as Harris
- Playboy of Paris (1930) as General (uncredited)
- Kismet (1930) as Jawan
- Tol'able David (1930) as Hunter Kinemon
- Playthings of Hollywood (1930) as Unknown Role
- The Painted Desert (1931) as Judge Matthews
- The Last Parade (1931) as City Editor (uncredited)
- Millie (1931) as Defense Attorney
- The She-Wolf (1931) as William Remington
- Young Sinners (1931) as Trent
- The Good Bad Girl (1931) as Mr. J.P. Henderson
- Defenders of the Law (1931) as Police Commander Randall
- The Public Defender (1931) as Frank Wells
- Wicked (1931)
- Chinatown After Dark (1931) as Le Fong
- Platinum Blonde (1931) as Conroy - the Editor
- Morals for Women (1931) as Mr. Huston
- Mata Hari (1931) as Warden
- The Hatchet Man (1932) as Yu Chang
- Cross-Examination (1932) as Dwight Simpson - Prosecuting Attorney
- The Reckoning (1932) as Doc
- Police Court (1932) as Judge Robert Webster
- Love Bound (1932) as J.B. 'Lucky' Morrison
- Young Bride (1932) as Mr. C. B. Chadwick, the Broker
- As You Desire Me (1932) as Friar (uncredited)
- Alias Mary Smith (1932) as Father
- The Hurricane Express (1932) as Frank Stratton
- Drifting Souls (1932) as Brad Martin
- The Cabin in the Cotton (1932) as Holmes Scott
- The Golden West (1932) as Sam Lynch
- Women Won't Tell (1932) as Attorney for the Defense
- Madame Butterfly (1932) as Cho-Cho's grandfather
- The Match King (1932) as Olaf Christofsen
- The Billion Dollar Scandal (1933) as Haddock
- International House (1933) as Dr. Wong
- Fighting with Kit Carson (1933, Serial) as Matt Fargo [Chs. 1–7, 12]
- Laughing at Life (1933) as Cabinet Officer
- The Stranger's Return (1933) as Dr. Craig (uncredited)
- A Man of Sentiment (1933) as John Russell Sr.
- Ladies Must Love (1933) as Thomas Van Dyne
- Only Yesterday (1933) as Wall Street Investor
- Female (1933) as Board Member (uncredited)
- Duck Soup (1933) as Former President Zander, Firefly's predecessor
- Above the Clouds (1933) as Crusty
- On Your Guard (1933) as Prison Warden
- Beloved (1934) as Maj. Tarrant
- Dancing Man (1934) as J.C. Trevor
- Come On, Marines! (1934) as Gen. Cabot
- Return of the Terror (1934) as Editor
- Treasure Island (1934) as Pirate of the Spanish Main
- The Law of the Wild (1934, Serial) as Dr. R.N. Price [Chs. 6, 11-12] (uncredited)
- Lost in the Stratosphere (1934) as Col. Brooks
- Broadway Bill (1934) as Presiding Judge
- The Marriage Bargain (1935) as Judge Robert Stanhope
