= The Weakness of Man =

1916 film directed by Barry O'Neil

The Weakness of Man (aka:The Greater Love)
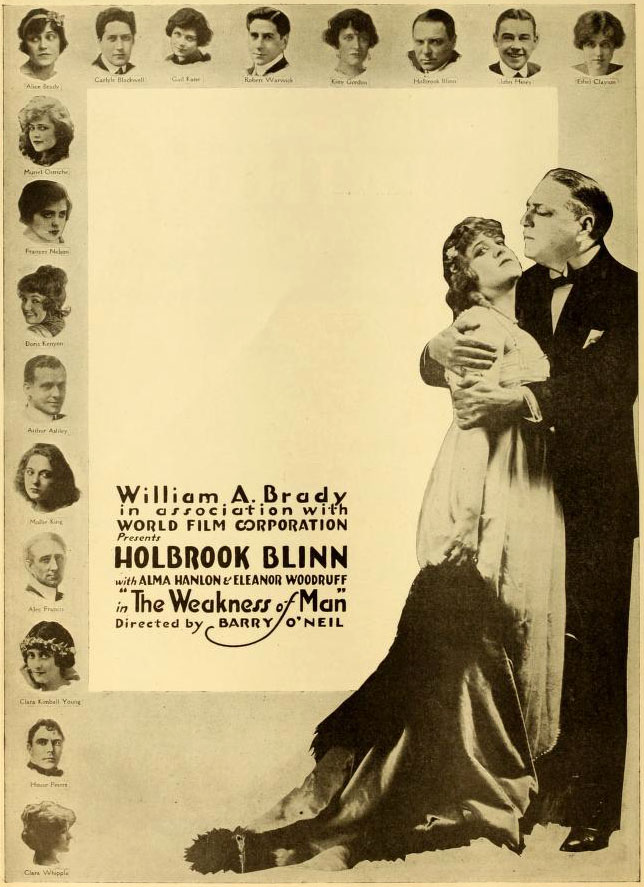
- Directed by: Barry O'Neil
- Written by: E. Lloyd Sheldon
- Based on: a play Zhivoy Trup, The Living Corpse by Leo Tolstoy
- Produced by: Peerless Productions; William A. Brady
- Starring: Holbrook Blinn
- Cinematography: Max Schneider
- Distributed by: World Film Company
- Release date: July 10, 1916
- Running time: 5 reels
- Country: USA
- Language: Silent...English intertitles

The Weakness of Man is a lost 1916 silent film drama directed by Barry O'Neil. It stars Holbrook Blinn and is based on the 1911 play The Living Corpse by Leo Tolstoy. It was produced by William A. Brady and distributed by World Film Company.

== Cast ==
- Holbrook Blinn - David Spencer
- Eleanor Woodruff - Janice Lane
- Richard Wangermann - John Spencer
- Charles Mackay - Dr. Stone
- Alma Hanlon - Babbie Norris
- Walter Greene - Bert Rollins (*as Walter D. Greene)
- Teddy Sampson - Estelle
- Johnny Hines - Sam Perkins (*as John Hines)
