= Conductor 1492 =

1924 film

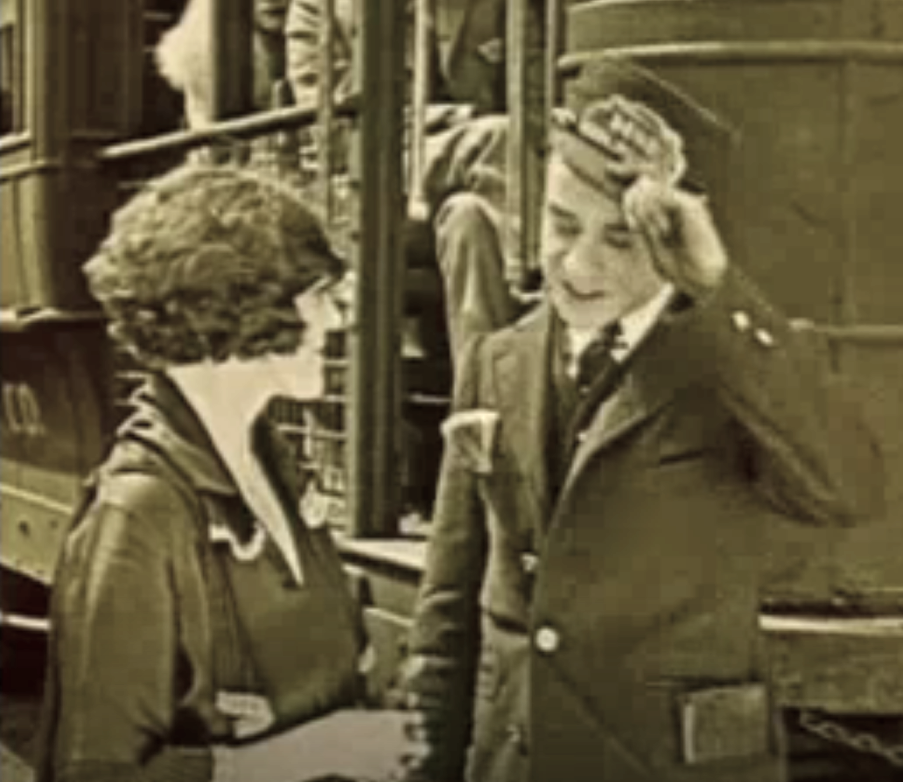
- Doris May and Johnny Hines in Conductor 1492
- Directed by: Charles Hines
- Story by: Johnny Hines
- Starring: Johnny Hines
- Cinematography: Charles E. Gilson
- Edited by: Clarence Kolster
- Production company: Warner Bros. Pictures
- Distributed by: Warner Bros. Pictures
- Release date: January 12, 1924
- Running time: 7 reels
- Country: United States
- Language: Silent (English intertitles)
- Budget: $107,000
- Box office: $334,000

Conductor 1492 is a 1924 American silent comedy film directed by Charles Hines and starring Johnny Hines. It was produced and distributed by Warner Bros. Pictures.

== Plot ==
As described in a review of the film in a film magazine, Terence O’Toole leaves his old home in Ireland to seek his fortune in America. He becomes "Conductor 1492" on a trolley car belonging to a system which both the president and vice-president are struggling to gain control. The outcome of this fight depends on two shares of stock which are missing and which if not found will bring disgrace to President Connelly. The villain produces two forged shares but Johnny's father saves the day by producing the real shares, which he bought a number of years before. In the meantime Terence has fallen in love with Connelly's daughter and he gets her as his reward.

== Cast ==
- Johnny Hines as Terry O'Toole
- Doris May as Noretta Connelly
- Dan Mason as Mike O'Toole
- Ruth Renick as Edna Brown
- Robert Cain as Richard Langford
- Fred Esmelton as Denman Connelly
- Byron Sage as Bobby Connelly
- Michael Dark as James Stoddard
- Dorothy Vernon as Mrs. Brown
- Cameo as a dog
- Billy Armstrong as Drunk at Party (uncredited)
- Al Cooke as Boarding House Drunk (uncredited)
- Dick Sutherland as Boarding House Hothead (uncredited)

== Box office ==
According to Warner Bros records the film earned $300,000 domestic and $34,000 foreign.

== Preservation ==
Conductor 1492 film has been preserved at several archives, including the Library of Congress, George Eastman Museum, and the UCLA Film & Television Archive. This version has been broadcast on television and cable. A mute print was transferred onto 16mm film by Associated Artists Productions/United Artists in the 1950s, and preserved at the Wisconsin Center for Film and Theater Research.
