= Johnny Hines =

American actor and film director (1895–1970)

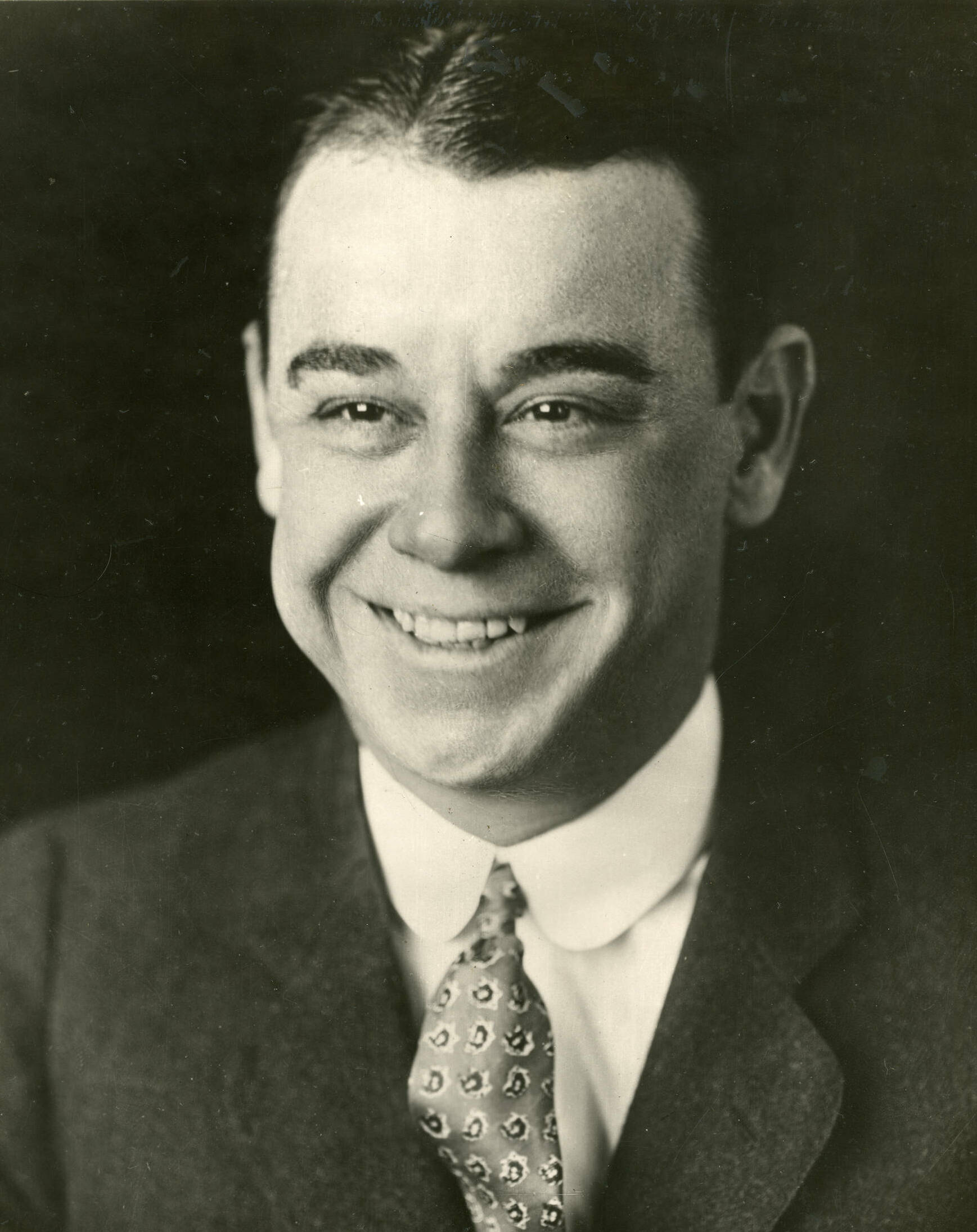
- Hines in 1926
- Born: John F. Hines; July 25, 1895; Golden, Colorado, U.S.
- Died: October 24, 1970 (aged 75); Los Angeles, California, U.S.
- Resting place: Calvary Cemetery (Los Angeles)
- Occupation: Actor
- Years active: 1914–1938
- Spouse: Irma Warner

John F. Hines (July 25, 1895 – October 24, 1970) was an American actor who had numerous film roles during the silent era, including many starring ones. He appeared in more than 50 films and numerous film shorts. But he did not succeed in transitioning well into talking pictures in the late 1920s, and had only six roles in the 1930s. He last appeared in a bit part in Magnificent Doll (1946).

Hines had two older brothers who also became involved in the new film industry: Charles as a director during the silent era, and Samuel as a bit-part actor during the early sound years.

== Life and career ==
Born in Golden, Colorado on June 25, 1895, John (known as Johnny) was the third of three Hines brothers: Samuel E. was the oldest and Charles was the second. All three brothers were later active in the film industry, Hines as an actor, Charles as a director primarily during the silent era, and Samuel as a bit-part actor during the early years of sound film.

In the early 1910s, Hines attended the City College of New York (CCNY), although it is unclear whether he obtained his degree. During the early years, many films were produced in New York and New Jersey, before Hollywood, California became a center of filmmaking.

Hines made his film debut in 1914, when he appeared in several shorts and three films; all were silent films. He was first seen in a featured role in The Man of the Hour, starring Robert Warwick. During the remaining more than 10 years of silent pictures, Hines appeared in almost 50 films, many times in starring roles.

His first starring role was in 1915's The Cub, directed by Maurice Tourneur. Some of his more notable films included Little Johnny Jones, in which he had a title role. It was the first film adaptation of the George M. Cohan musical of the same name. He also starred in the film version of Leo Tolstoy's Zhivoy trup (The Living Corpse), entitled The Weakness of Man.

During the silent era, Hines co-directed two of the films in which he starred: Burn 'Em Up Barnes (1921) and Little Johnny Jones (1923). Hines wrote the screenplay Conductor 1492 (1924), in which he also starred, and his brother, Charles, directed.

With the advent of sound in the motion picture industry, Hines's career went into decline. The "talkies" called for different skills and not all actors could make the transition. During the 1930s, Hines appeared in only six films, all in smaller, supporting roles. In 1938 he played his last significant film role, that of Parsons in Too Hot to Handle. It starred Clark Gable, Myrna Loy and Walter Pidgeon. He appeared in only one more film, Magnificent Doll (1946), in which he had a bit part while Ginger Rogers and David Niven starred.

Hines died on October 24, 1970, at the age of 75 in Los Angeles, California. He was buried in Calvary Cemetery.

== Filmography ==
(Per AFI database)

- As Ye Sow (1914) (as John Hines)
- The Man of the Hour (1914) (as John Hines)
- The Wishing Ring: An Idyll of Old England (1914) (as John Hines)
- The Arrival of Perpetua (1915) (as John Hines)
- A Price for Folly (1915) (as John Hines)
- Alias Jimmy Valentine (1915) (as John Hines)
- A Butterfly on the Wheel (1915) (as John Hines)
- The Cub (1915) (as John Hines)
- The Family Cupboard (1915) (as John Hines)
- The Gray Mask (1915) (as John Hines)
- Little Miss Brown (1915) (as John Hines)
- All Man (1916) – Snap Higgins
- Miss Petticoats (1916)
- The Pawn of Fate (1916) (as John Hines)
- The Weakness of Man (1916) (as John Hines)
- The Dancer's Peril (1917)
- A Girl's Folly (1917)
- Tillie Wakes Up (1917)
- Yankee Pluck (1917)
- Youth (1917)
- Man's Woman (1917)
- Just Sylvia (1918)
- Neighbors (1918)
- The Power and the Glory (1918)
- The Golden Wall (1918) (as John Hines)
- Merely Players (1918) (as John Hines)
- The Studio Girl (1918) (as John Hines)
- Sunshine Nan (1918) (as John Hines)
- What Love Forgives (1919) (as John Hines)
- The Little Intruder (1919) (as John Hines)
- Heart of Gold (1919)
- Three Green Eyes (1919)
- Burn 'Em Up Barnes — Also co-directed (1921)
- Sure Fire Flint (1922)
- Little Johnny Jones — Also co-directed (1923)
- Luck (1923)
- Conductor 1492 — Also wrote (1924)
- The Speed Spook (1924)
- The Crackerjack (1925)
- The Early Bird (1925)
- The Live Wire (1925)
- The Brown Derby (1926)
- Rainbow Riley (1926)
- Stepping Along (1926)
- All Aboard (1927)
- Home Made (1927)
- White Pants Willie (1927)
- Chinatown Charlie (1928)
- The Wright Idea (1928)
- The Runaround (1931)
- The Girl in 419 (1933)
- Her Bodyguard (1933)
- Whistling in the Dark (1933)
- Society Doctor (1935)
- Rhythm Racketeer (1937) (Note: Not in AFI source, but is listed in BFI)
- Too Hot to Handle (1938) - Mr. Parsons
- Magnificent Doll (1946) (as John Hines)
