= Restless Wives (1924 film) =

1924 film

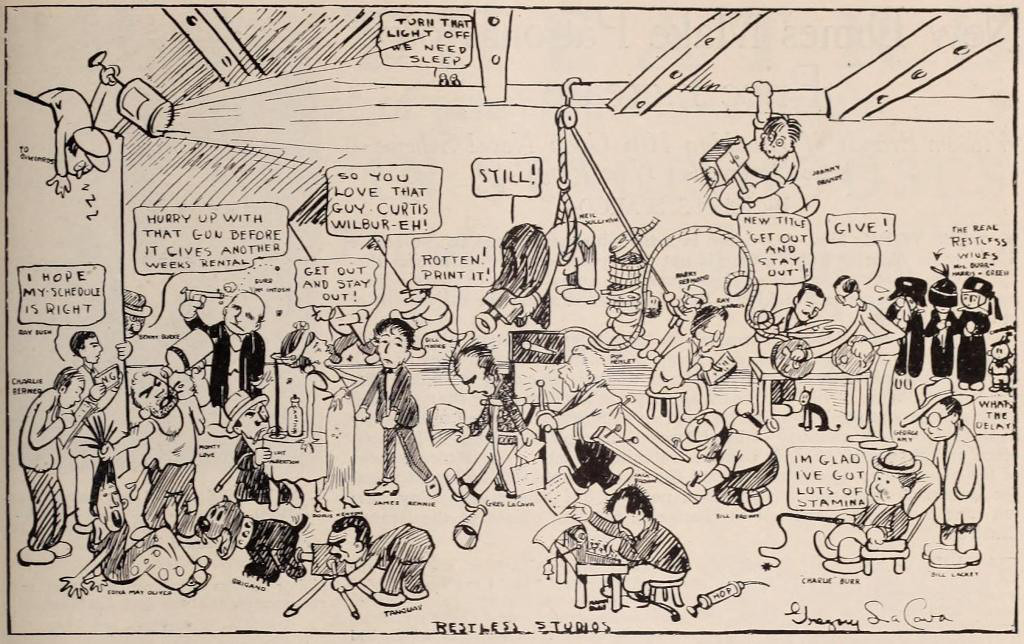
- Cartoon drawn by director Gregory La Cava caricaturing the production of Restless Wives
- Directed by: Gregory La Cava
- Written by: Raymond S. Harris (intertitles)
- Screenplay by: Mann Page
- Based on: Restless Wives by Izola Forrester
- Produced by: C.C. Burr
- Starring: Doris Kenyon; James Rennie
- Cinematography: John W. Brown (credited as Jack Brown)
- Edited by: Raymond S. Harris
- Production company: C.C. Burr Pictures
- Release date: January 6, 1924
- Running time: 7 reels
- Country: United States
- Language: Silent (English intertitles)

Restless Wives is a lost 1924 American silent melodrama film directed by Gregory La Cava. A vintage movie trailer displaying short clips of the film still exists.

== Plot ==
Polly is a wealthy wife neglected by her husband James Benson. When a business engagement causes James to miss their wedding anniversary, Polly goes with admirer Curtis Wilbur to a cabaret, and later she decides to go live with her father. James, who is desperate for reconciliation, kidnaps Polly while she's with Wilbur and takes her to his lodge in the mountains. James is shot by a drunken servant and when he falls, he knocks over a lamp and sets the place on fire. Polly drags him out of the lodge to safety, and the couple is reunited.

== Cast ==
- Doris Kenyon as Polly Benson
- James Rennie as James Benson
- Montagu Love as Hugo Cady
- Edmund Breese as Hobart Richards
- Burr McIntosh as Pelham Morrison
- Coit Albertson as Curtis Wilbur
- Naomi Childers as Mrs. Drake
- Maud Sinclair as Mrs. Cady
- Edna May Oliver as Benson's Secretary
- De Sacia Mooers (uncredited)
