= Three O'Clock in the Morning (film) =

1923 film

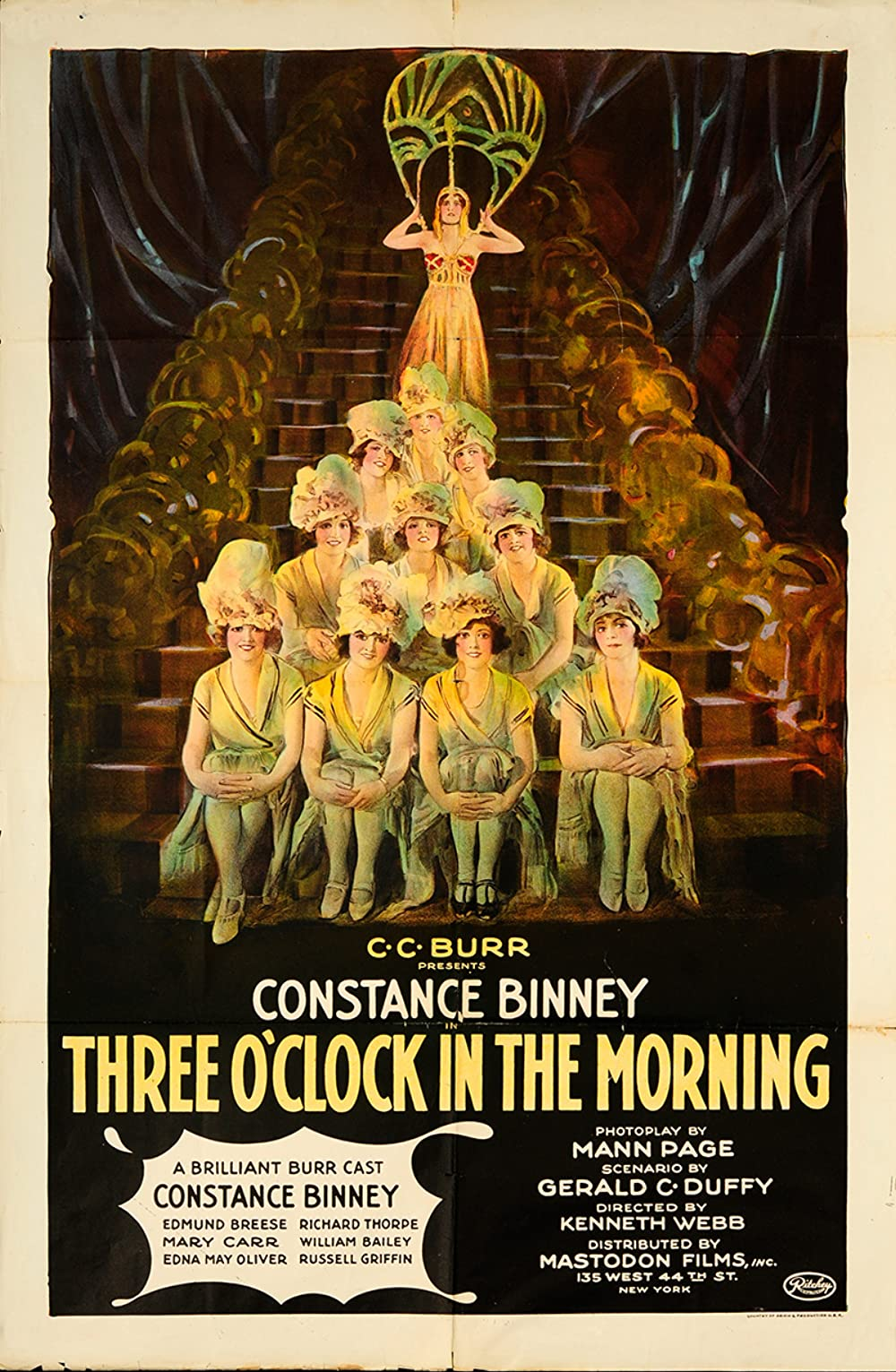
- Theatrical release poster
- Directed by: Kenneth S. Webb
- Written by: Gerald C. Duffy; Mann Page
- Produced by: C.C. Burr
- Starring: Constance Binney; Edmund Breese; Richard Thorpe
- Cinematography: John W. Brown; William McCoy; Neil Sullivan
- Production company: C.C. Burr Productions
- Distributed by: Mastodon Films
- Release date: December 1, 1923
- Running time: 70 minutes
- Country: United States
- Language: Silent (English intertitles)

Three O'Clock in the Morning is a lost 1923 American silent drama film directed by Kenneth S. Webb and starring Constance Binney, Edmund Breese, and Richard Thorpe.

== Plot ==
As described in a film magazine review, Elizabeth Winthrop becomes fascinated with cabaret life and makes friends who are objectionable to her parents. She resents her father's treatment of her friends and leaves home. She seeks work as a chorus girl in New York City and is aided by Hugo von Strohm, who unknown to her pays for her salary at the cabaret. Clayton Webster, her fiancé, objects to her work so she returns his engagement ring. Hugo invites her to a roadhouse and tries to force his attentions on her. On the way to the roadhouse, she is recognized by her mother and is rescued. Clayton is bound to leave by steamship to South America. Elizabeth arrives at the pier just as the ship is pulling away and wigwags that she loves him. He jumps overboard and swims ashore.

== Cast ==
- Constance Binney as Elizabeth Winthrop
- Edmund Breese as Mr. Winthrop
- Richard Thorpe as Clayton Webster
- Mary Carr as Mrs. Winthrop
- William Bailey as Hugo von Strohm
- Edna May Oliver as Hetty
- Russell Griffin as Mickey Flynn

== Preservation ==
With no holdings located in archives, Three O'Clock in the Morning is considered a lost film.

== Bibliography ==
- Connelly, Robert B. The Silents: Silent Feature Films, 1910-36, Volume 40, Issue 2. December Press, 1998.
- Munden, Kenneth White. The American Film Institute Catalog of Motion Pictures Produced in the United States, Part 1. University of California Press, 1997.
