= Charles Hines (director) =

American director

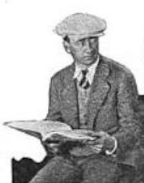
- Born: February 14, 1892; Oakland, Pennsylvania, United States
- Died: July 16, 1936 (aged 44); Los Angeles, California, United States
- Occupations: Director, actor
- Years active: 1917–1928 (film)

Charles Hines (1892–1936) was an American actor and film director of the silent era. Born in Pennsylvania, he was the second of three brothers who had careers in the new film industry. He died at the age of 43 in Los Angeles, California.

His younger brother, actor Johnny Hines, appeared in 50 films, mostly during the silent era. Hines directed him in some of these films. Their older brother Samuel E. Hines had mostly bit-parts in silents.

== Selected filmography ==
- The Argyle Case (1917) (actor)
- Conductor 1492 (1924)
- The Speed Spook (1924)
- The Early Bird (1925)
- The Crackerjack (1925)
- The Live Wire (1925)
- Rainbow Riley (1926)
- Stepping Along (1926)
- The Brown Derby (1926)
- White Pants Willie (1927)
- All Aboard (1927)
- Home Made (1927)
- Chinatown Charlie (1928)
- The Wright Idea (1928)
- Wings in the Dark (1935) (actor)

== Bibliography ==
- Munden, Kenneth White. The American Film Institute Catalog of Motion Pictures Produced in the United States, Part 1. University of California Press, 1997.
