= The Early Bird (1925 film) =

1925 film

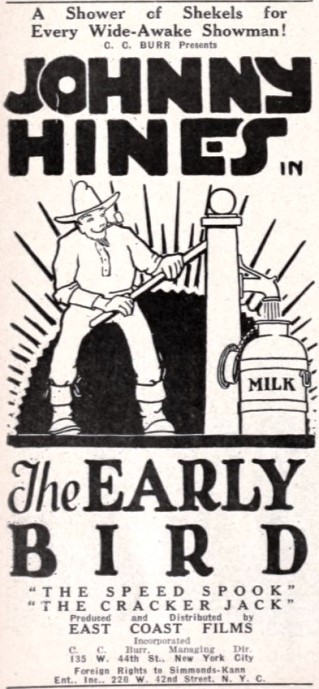
- Advertisement
- Directed by: Charles Hines
- Written by: Argyle Campbell; Richard M. Friel; Victor Grandin; Ralph Spence
- Produced by: C.C. Burr
- Starring: Johnny Hines; Sigrid Holmquist; Wyndham Standing
- Cinematography: John Geisel; Charles E. Gilson; Neil Sullivan
- Production company: C.C. Burr Productions
- Distributed by: East Coast Productions
- Release date: January 1, 1925
- Running time: 79 minutes
- Country: United States
- Language: Silent (English intertitles)

The Early Bird is a 1925 American silent comedy film directed by Charles Hines and starring Johnny Hines, Sigrid Holmquist, and Wyndham Standing.

== Plot ==
As described in a review in a film magazine, Jimmy Burke, independent milk man, changes clothes with a wealthy young chap who wants to put pep into a party, and, at the same time, party hostess Jean Blair dresses as a maid. Jimmy takes a shine to her and invites her to a ride in his wagon and she accepts. George Fairchild, manager of the milk trust of which Jean is president, is pulling crooked business, and Jimmy gets on to him. Jimmy organizes the independent men and they make him president. Fairchild plans to buy him out. Jimmy learns that the supposed maid is Jean, and believes she was making fun of him. Jean discovers Fairchild’s crookedness and discharges him. She also gets wind of his plan to poison the independent’s supply, and sends a message to Jimmy who goes out and destroys the early deliveries. She goes to the plant and Fairchild’s aide locks her in the refrigerating room. Jimmy arrives on the scene, fights the villain, and rescues Jean just as she is about to be killed by a machine used for cutting the ice. After this everything points to wedding bells for Jimmy and Jean.

== Cast ==
- Johnny Hines as Jimmy Burke
- Sigrid Holmquist as Jean Blair
- Wyndham Standing as George Fairchild
- Edmund Breese as The Great La Tour, an actor
- Maude Turner Gordon as Jean's Aunt
- Bradley Barker as Fairchild's Accomplice
- Flora Finch as Miss Quincy
- John De Lacey as Flyn

== Preservation ==
A complete print of The Early Bird is held in the Library of Congress and UCLA Film & Television Archive.

== Bibliography ==
- Munden, Kenneth White. The American Film Institute Catalog of Motion Pictures Produced in the United States, Part 1. University of California Press, 1997.
