= You Are Guilty =

1923 film

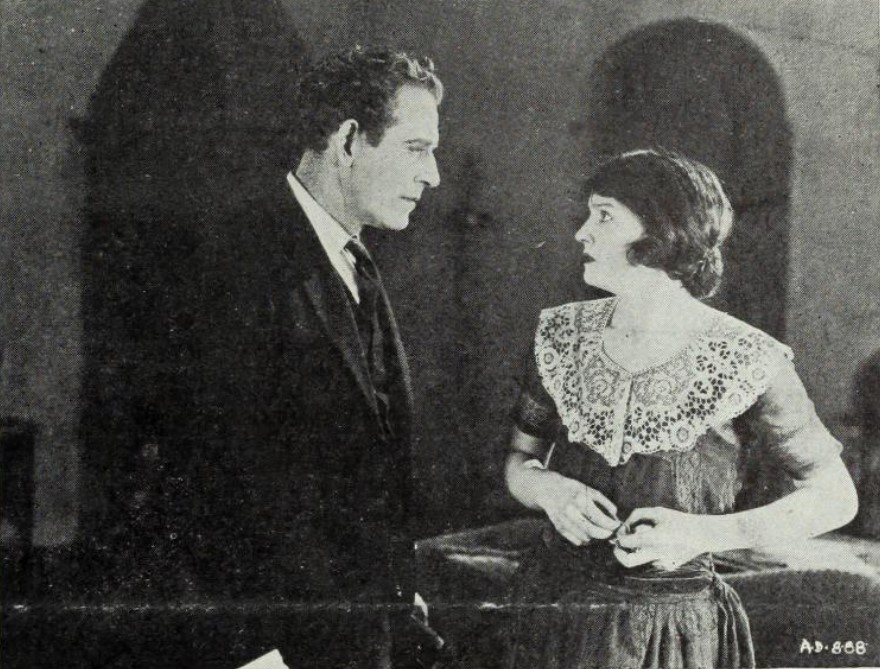
- Directed by: Edgar Lewis
- Written by: Gerald C. Duffy; Roy Middleton
- Produced by: C.C. Burr
- Starring: James Kirkwood; Doris Kenyon; Robert Edeson
- Cinematography: Edward Earle
- Production company: Mastodon Films
- Distributed by: Mastodon Films
- Release date: May 21, 1923
- Running time: 50 minutes
- Country: United States
- Languages: Silent; English intertitles

You Are Guilty is a 1923 American silent drama film directed by Edgar Lewis and starring James Kirkwood, Doris Kenyon and Robert Edeson.

== Synopsis ==
Stephen Martin takes the blame over some missing funds in order to spare his half-brother shame. He is forced to give up his sweetheart and travel around the world.

== Cast ==
- James Kirkwood as Stephen Martin
- Doris Kenyon as Alice Farrell
- Robert Edeson as Theodore Tennent
- Mary Carr as Mrs. Grantwood
- Russell Griffin as 'Buddy' Tennent
- Edmund Breese as Judge Elkins
- Carlton Brickert as Joseph D. Grantwood
- Riley Hatch as Murphy

== Preservation ==
The film survives in abridged form.

== Bibliography ==
- Connelly, Robert B. The Silents: Silent Feature Films, 1910–36, Volume 40, Issue 2. December Press, 1998.
- Munden, Kenneth White. The American Film Institute Catalog of Motion Pictures Produced in the United States, Part 1. University of California Press, 1997.
