= Combat (film) =

1927 film directed by Albert Hiatt

- Directed by: Albert Hiatt
- Written by: William B. Laub
- Produced by: Burton L. King
- Starring: George Walsh; Bradley Barker; Claire Adams
- Cinematography: Marcel Le Picard
- Production company: Burton King Productions
- Distributed by: Pathe Exchange
- Release date: October 23, 1927
- Running time: 50 minutes
- Country: United States
- Languages: Silent; English intertitles

Combat is a 1927 American silent adventure film directed by Albert Hiatt and starring George Walsh, Bradley Barker and Claire Adams.

== Cast ==
- George Walsh as Jack Hammond
- Bradley Barker as Capt. Samuel Yearkes
- Claire Adams as Wanda, his ward
- Gladys Hulette as Risa Bartlett
- Dex Reynolds as Craig Gordon

== Bibliography ==
- Munden, Kenneth White. The American Film Institute Catalog of Motion Pictures Produced in the United States, Part 1. University of California Press, 1997.
