= The Crackerjack =

1925 film

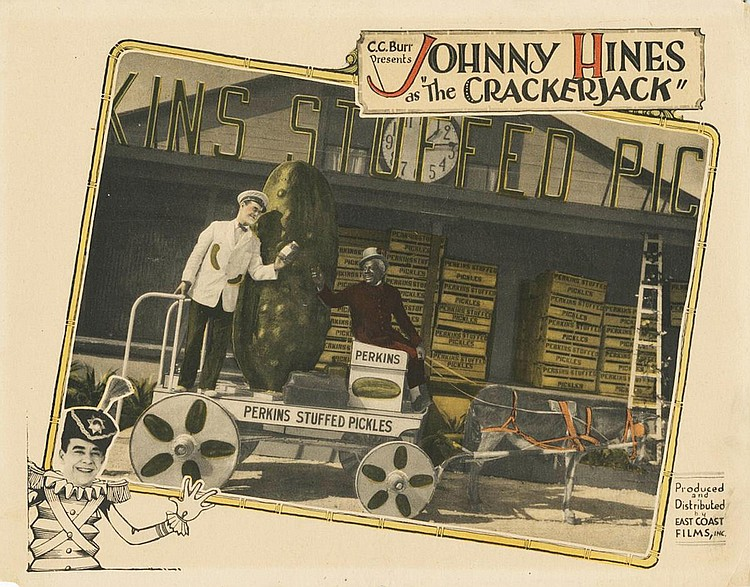
- Lobby card
- Directed by: Charles Hines
- Written by: Argyle Campbell; Richard M. Friel; Victor Grandin; John W. Krafft
- Produced by: C.C. Burr
- Starring: Johnny Hines; Sigrid Holmquist; Henry West
- Cinematography: John Geisel; Charles E. Gilson; Al Wilson
- Production company: C.C. Burr Productions
- Distributed by: East Coast Productions
- Release date: May 8, 1925
- Running time: 70 minutes
- Country: United States
- Languages: Silent; English intertitles

The Crackerjack is a 1925 American silent comedy film directed by Charles Hines and starring Johnny Hines, Sigrid Holmquist, and Henry West.

A travelling pickle salesman gets mixed up in a Latin American revolution.

== Plot ==
As described in a film magazine review, Tommy Perkins meets and falls in love with Rose Bannon, daughter of General Bannon. The general is in New York City with the revolutionist Alonzo López, who plans to overthrow the government of Esquasado. Perkins is called to the South by his uncle who wishes him to take over a pickle factory that is on its last legs. He applies crackerjack methods to build up the business, and runs into Rose while going about his work. When he learns of a plot to overthrow the South American government, he aids in frustrating those plans. The pickle business blooms and he marries Rose.

== Cast ==
- Johnny Hines as Tommy Perkins
- Sigrid Holmquist as Rose Bannon
- Henry West as Gen. Bannon
- Bradley Barker as Alonzo López
- J. Barney Sherry as Col. Perkins

== Bibliography ==
- Munden, Kenneth White. The American Film Institute Catalog of Motion Pictures Produced in the United States, Part 1. University of California Press, 1997. ISBN 978-0-520-20969-5.
