= C.C. Burr =

American film producer

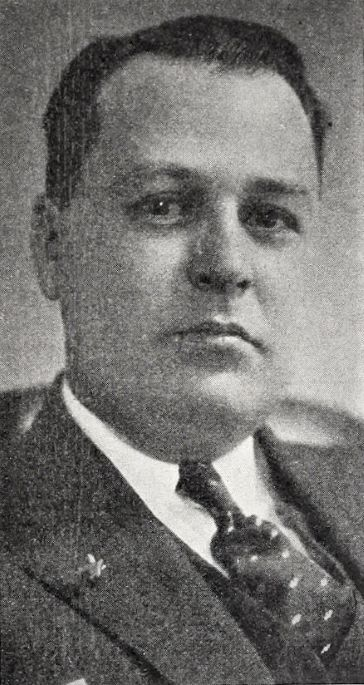
- From a 1926 magazine
- Born: January 30, 1891; Brooklyn, New York, United States
- Died: June 4, 1956 (aged 65); Hollywood, California, United States
- Other name: Charles C. Burr
- Occupation: Producer
- Years active: 1920–1940

C.C. Burr (1891–1956) was an American film producer of the silent and early sound eras. He also directed eleven short films. Originally an employee at Paramount Pictures, he branched out into independent production, working with a number of different distributors over two decades.

== Selected filmography ==
- The Silent Barrier (1920)
- Burn 'Em Up Barnes (1921)
- I Am the Law (1922)
- Sure Fire Flint (1922)
- The Secrets of Paris (1922)
- The Last Hour (1923)
- Luck (1923)
- Three O'Clock in the Morning (1923)
- You Are Guilty (1923)
- The Average Woman (1924)
- Restless Wives (1924)
- The Speed Spook (1924)
- The New School Teacher (1924)
- Youth for Sale (1924)
- Lend Me Your Husband (1924)
- The Crackerjack (1925)
- The Live Wire (1925)
- The Early Bird (1925)
- The Brown Derby (1926)
- Rainbow Riley (1926)
- Stepping Along (1926)
- White Pants Willie (1927)
- All Aboard (1927)
- Home Made (1927)
- Dreary House (1928)
- Chinatown Charlie (1928)
- The Wright Idea (1928)
- Call of the Circus (1930)
- Western Limited (1932)
- The Midnight Patrol (1932)
- Money Means Nothing (1934)
- The Moth (1934)
- Kentucky Blue Streak (1935)
- Rip Roaring Riley (1935)
- Suicide Squad (1935)
- Skybound (1935)
- I'll Name the Murderer (1936)
- The Reckless Way (1936)
- Special Agent K-7 (1937)
- In Old Montana (1939)
- Code of the Fearless (1939)
- Two Gun Troubador (1939)
- Ridin' the Trail (1940)

== Bibliography ==
- Koszarski, Richard. Hollywood on the Hudson: Film and Television in New York from Griffith to Sarnoff. Rutgers University Press, 2008.
- Pokorny, Michael & Sedgwick, John. An Economic History of Film. Routledge, 2004.
