= Bradley Barker =

American actor (1883–1951)

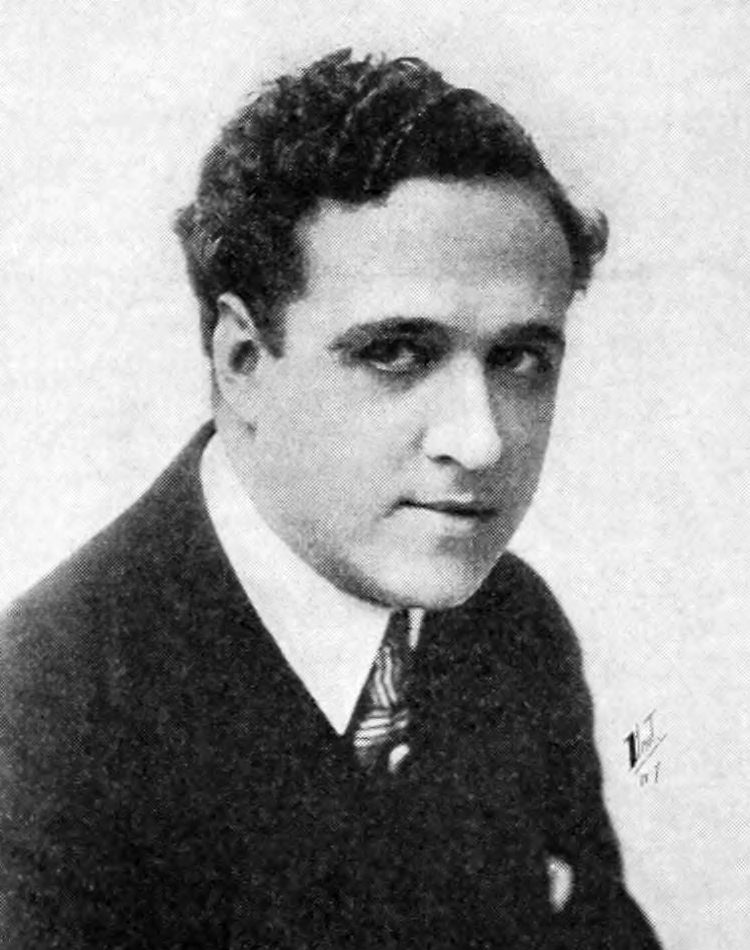
- Barker in 1915
- Born: January 18, 1883; Long Island, New York, U.S.
- Died: September 29, 1951 (aged 68); New York City, U.S.
- Occupations: Actor, film director
- Years active: 1915–1930

Bradley Barker (January 18, 1883 – September 29, 1951) was an American actor and director of the silent film era. He later created sound effects for film and radio, notably the first voice of Metro-Goldwyn-Mayer's trademark Leo the Lion. He specialized as a mimic of animal sounds on CBS Radio's The March of Time.

== Biography ==
Born in Long Island, New York, Barker was a vaudeville performer and an actor in stock theater. He appeared in 70 films between 1915 and 1928. He also directed seven films between 1929 and 1930.

After working in front of the camera, Barker began creating sound effects for radio programs and films. He created the roar of the MGM lion on screen before the studio began using a recording of a real lion, and provided sounds of a variety of animals on radio. Radio programs on which he worked included The March of Time, Let's Pretend and Little Orphan Annie.

On September 29, 1951, Barker died at his home in New York City at age 68.

== Selected filmography ==
- What Happened to Jones (1915)
- The Moth and the Flame (1915)
- The House with Nobody in It (1915)
- The Little Gypsy (1915)
- The Jury of Fate (1917)
- Little Miss Fortune (1917)
- Billy and the Big Stick (1917)
- The Road Between (1917)
- The Eyes of Mystery (1918)
- Men (1918)
- A Woman's Experience (1919)
- Erstwhile Susan (1919)
- Wanted: A Husband (1919)
- The Master Mind (1920)
- Away Goes Prudence (1920)
- The Fear Market (1920)
- Devotion (1921)
- Silas Marner (1922)
- The Secrets of Paris (1922)
- The Leavenworth Case (1923)
- Twenty-One (1923)
- Into the Net (1924)
- Playthings of Desire (1924)
- The Man Without a Heart (1924)
- The Live Wire (1925)
- Ermine and Rhinestones (1925)
- The Crackerjack (1925)
- The Police Patrol (1925)
- False Pride (1925)
- The Early Bird (1925)
- Rainbow Riley (1926)
- The Brown Derby (1926)
- The Potters (1927)
- His Rise to Fame (1927)
- Combat (1927)
- Inspiration (1928)
- Mother's Boy (1929)
