= The Live Wire (1925 film) =

1925 film

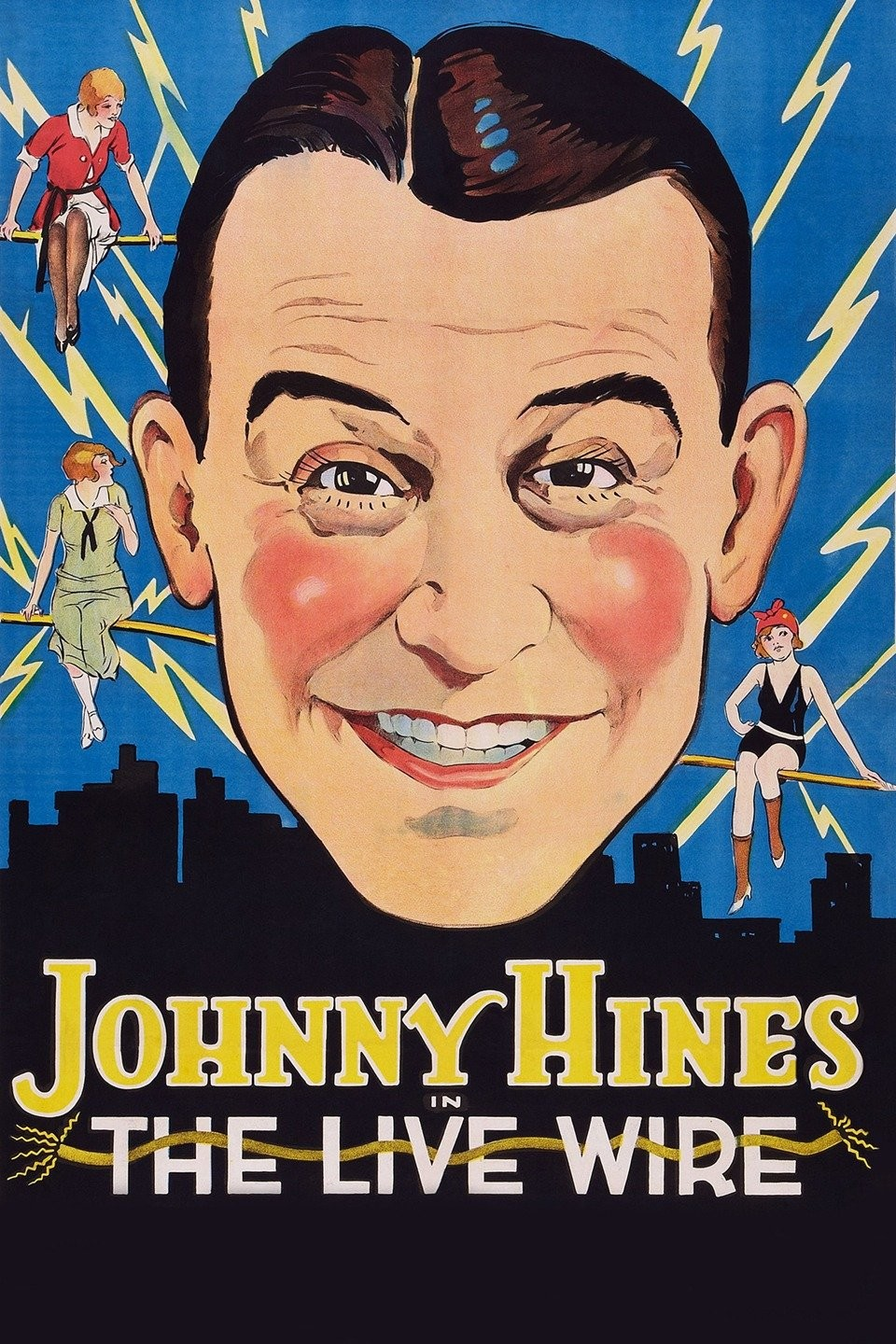
- Theatrical release poster
- Directed by: Charles Hines
- Screenplay by: John W. Krafft
- Based on: The Game of Light by Richard Washburn Child
- Produced by: C.C. Burr
- Starring: Johnny Hines; Edmund Breese; Mildred Ryan; J. Barney Sherry; Bradley Barker; Flora Finch
- Cinematography: Charles E. Gilson; John Geisel; Paul Strand
- Edited by: George Amy
- Production company: C.C. Burr Productions
- Distributed by: First National Pictures
- Release date: September 20, 1925
- Running time: 80 minutes
- Country: United States
- Language: Silent (English intertitles)

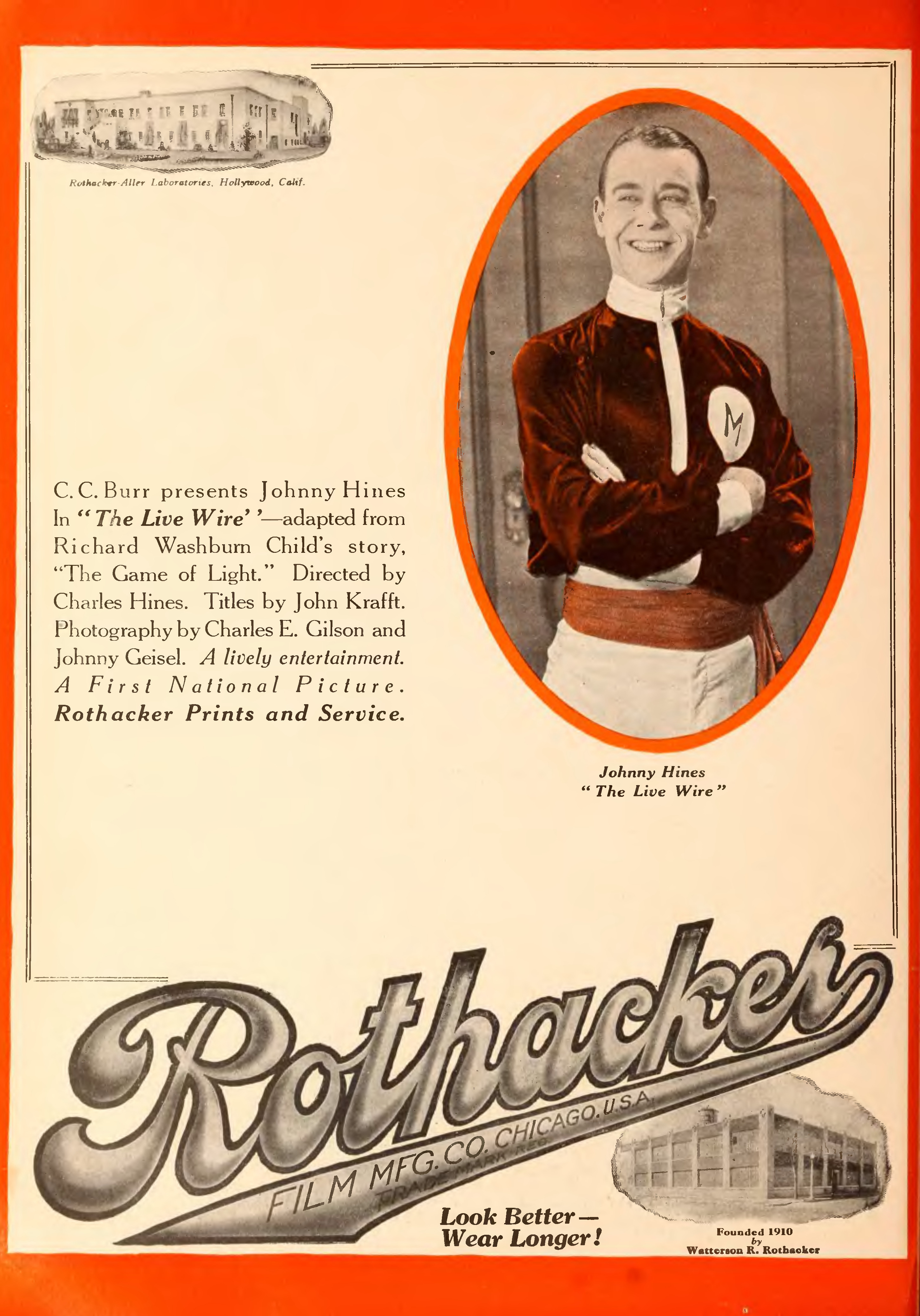
Johnny Hines The Live Wire ad in Motion Picture News, 1925

The Live Wire is a 1925 American comedy film directed by Charles Hines and written by John W. Krafft. The film stars Johnny Hines, Edmund Breese, Mildred Ryan, J. Barney Sherry, Bradley Barker, and Flora Finch. The film was released on September 20, 1925, by First National Pictures.

== Plot ==
As described in a film magazine reviews, The Great Maranelli, who does a head slide on a wire for a circus, is forced to give up this work. He becomes a salesman for a light and power company owned by Henry Langdon. Langdon has started an amusement park in partnership with George Trent, who seeks to gain entire control by telling Langdon that he cannot sell the concessions. Langdon gives his stock to his daughter Dorothy, who engages Maranelli and Sawdust Sam to help her. Maranelli soon disposes of the concessions. Trent, in an endeavor to force Dorothy to sign over her stock to him, takes her prisoner. He also instructs one of his henchman to wreck the plant used to furnish light for the opening night of the park. In making the connection from the main power plant to the park plant, Sam sees Dorothy imprisoned. He notifies Maranelli, who rescues Dorothy. She makes Maranelli and Sam her partners and agrees to give her hand to Maranelli in matrimony.

== Cast ==
- Johnny Hines as The Great Maranelli
- Edmund Breese as Sawdust Sam
- Mildred Ryan as Dorothy Langdon
- J. Barney Sherry as Henry Langdon
- Bradley Barker as George Trent
- Flora Finch as Pansy Darwin

== Preservation ==
An incomplete print of The Live Wire is held by the Library of Congress and George Eastman Museum Motion Picture Collection.
