= Yankee Pluck =

1917 film directed by George Archainbaud

- Directed by: George Archainbaud
- Written by: Willard Mack
- Produced by: William A. Brady
- Starring: Ethel Clayton; Montagu Love; Johnny Hines
- Cinematography: Philip Hatkin
- Production company: World Film
- Distributed by: World Film
- Release date: May 21, 1917
- Running time: 50 minutes
- Country: United States
- Languages: Silent; English intertitles

Yankee Pluck is a 1917 American silent drama film directed by George Archainbaud and starring Ethel Clayton, Montagu Love, and Johnny Hines.

== Cast ==
- Ethel Clayton as Polly Pollard
- Edward Langford as Lieutenant Richard Travers
- Johnny Hines as Lieutenant Tommy Patterson
- Montagu Love as Baron Wootchi
- Eric Wayne as George Henry Singleton
- Charles Bowser as John Pollard
- Isette Monroe as Mrs. Madison Derwent

== Production ==
The working title for the film was Pretty Polly Pollard, changed to Yankee Pluck in early May, 1917.

== Reception ==
Wid's Films and Film Folk's review was entirely negative, calling the film a "cheap, crude 'meller' without any redeeming feature."

Motion Picture News reviewer Peter Milne described the film as a "very fair picture." He criticized the plot detail of a Japanese spy seeking submarine plans as being "not at all indicative of good diplomacy," and The Maryland Country Club for looking like a gangsters' hideout.

Variety's review was mostly positive, praising the artistic efforts despite "there is little or nothing original about the plot." The reviewer also praised the performances of Johnny Hines and Charles Bowser in particular.

== Censorship ==
Before Yankee Pluck could be released in Kansas, the Kansas Board of Review required all scenes of women smoking cigarettes to be eliminated.

== Bibliography ==
- Donald W. McCaffrey & Christopher P. Jacobs. Guide to the Silent Years of American Cinema. Greenwood Publishing, 1999. ISBN 0-313-30345-2
