= Henry A. Barrows =

American actor (1875–1945)

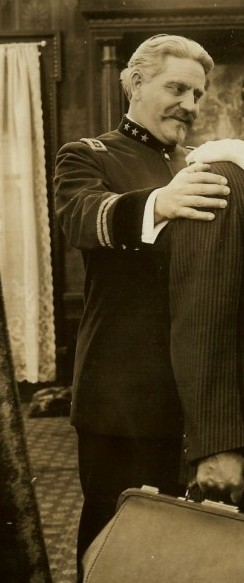
- Barrows in The Fires of Conscience (1916)
- Born: Henry Arthur Barrows; April 29, 1875; Saco, Maine, U.S.
- Died: March 25, 1945 (aged 69); Los Angeles, California, U.S.
- Resting place: Los Angeles National Cemetery
- Other name: Henry Barrows
- Occupation: Actor
- Years active: 1913–1936
- Children: George Barrows

Henry Arthur Barrows (April 29, 1875 – March 25, 1945) was an American actor who appeared in films from 1913 to 1936.

Barrows performed in supporting roles for American, Astra, Biograph, Brentwood, Pathe, Universal, and Vitagraph studios. He was "almost always cast as pillars of society, doctors, judges, bishops, and the like". His son, George Barrows, was also an actor.

Barrows was born in Saco, Maine. He died in Los Angeles, California in 1945 and was interred there in the Los Angeles National Cemetery. He is the father of actor George Barrows.

== Partial filmography ==
- Her Nerve (1913)
- On Suspicion (1914)
- The Gold Thief (1914)
- The Guiding Fate (1914)
- A Woman's Folly (1914)
- All for Business (1914)
- The Dole of Destiny (1914)
- The Child Thou Gavest Me (1914)
- His Prior Claim (1914)
- The Way Home (1914)
- From The Shadow (1915)
- The Inevitable Retribution (1915)
- The Dancer's Ruse (1915)
- The Borrowed Necklace (1915)
- The Ventures of Marguerite (1915)
- The Secret Message (1915)
- A Soldier's Oath (1915)
- A Man of Sorrow (1916)
- The Fires of Conscience (1916)
- The Man from Bitter Roots (1916)
- On Record (1917)
- The Silent Lie (1917)
- The End of the Trail (1917)
- The World Apart (1917)
- Captain of the Gray Horse Troop (1917)
- Charity Castle (1917)
- Lost in Transit (1917)
- Her Country's Call (1917)
- Heir of all Ages (1917)
- The Bride's Silence (1917)
- The Sunset Trail (1917)
- The Stainless Barrier (1917)
- The Kaiser, the Beast of Berlin (1918)
- Hungry Eyes (1918)
- The Girl Who Wouldn't Quit (1918)
- The Magic Eye (1918)
- The House of Silence (1918)
- The Claws of the Hun (1918)
- The Finger of Justice (1918)
- For Husbands Only (1918)
- Hobbs in a Hurry (1918)
- The Temple of Dusk (1918)
- Quicksand (1918)
- Venus in the East (1919)
- The Amazing Impostor (1919)
- Come Again Smith (1919)
- Common Clay (1919)
- Gambling in Souls (1919)
- The Hellion (1919)
- The Trembling Hour (1919)
- The Lion Man (1919)
- The Phantom Melody (1920)
- The House of Toys (1920)
- Love's Protegé (1920)
- A Master Stroke (1920)
- The Veiled Mystery (1920)
- The Purple Cipher (1920)
- Tiger True (1921)
- It Can Be Done (1921)
- Rent Free (1922)
- The Law and the Woman (1922)
- The Woman's Side (1922)
- The Wise Kid (1922)
- The Man from Downing Street (1922)
- Yellow Men and Gold (1922)
- Putting It Over (1922)
- A Tailor-Made Man (1922)
- The Great Night (1922)
- The Footlight Ranger (1923)
- Jazzmania (1923)
- What Wives Now (1923)
- Mary of the Movies (1923)
- The Shock (1923)
- Broadway Gold (1923)
- Long Live the King (1923)
- Sporting Youth (1924)
- Girl Shy (1924) (uncredited)
- The Marriage Cheat (1924)
- Between Friends (1924)
- The Sea Hawk (1924)
- The Reckless Age (1924)
- Captain Blood (1924)
- Drusilla with a Million (1925)
- Mistaken Orders (1925)
- The Lost Express (1925)
- Crack o' Dawn (1925)
- Big Pal (1925)
- His Majesty, Bunker Bean (1925)
- The Man on the Box (1925)
- Cobra (1925)
- The Little Irish Girl (1926)
- Oh What a Nurse! (1926)
- Footloose Widows (1926)
- Skinner's Dress Suit (1926)
- Atta Boy (1926)
- The Lost Limited (1927)
- Horse Shoes (1927)
- The Return of the Riddle Rider (1927)
- All Aboard (1927)
- The Sunset Derby (1927)
- White Pants Willie (1927)
- Three's a Crowd (1927)
- The Man Who Laughs (1928)
- Burning Bridges (1928)
- A Perfect Gentleman (1928)
- Woman Who Dare (1928)
- The Wright Idea (1928)
- Some Mother's Boy (1929)
- The Drakes Sell (1929)
- The Kibbitzer
- You Said It, Sailor (1930)
- Arabian Knights (1931)
- Guilty Hands (1931)
- The Animal Kingdom (1932)
- Broadway Bill (1934)
- Dangerous Waters (1936)
