= Margaret Seddon =

American actress (1872–1968)

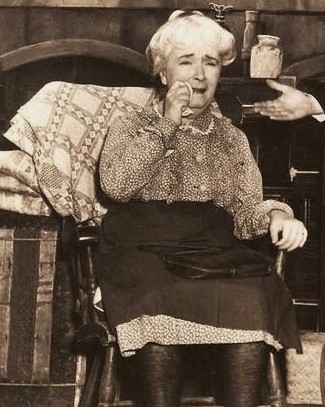
- Seddon in The Meanest Man in the World (1943)
- Born: November 18, 1872; Washington, D.C., U.S.
- Died: April 17, 1968 (aged 95); Philadelphia, Pennsylvania, U.S.
- Occupation: Actress
- Years active: 1915–1951

Margaret Seddon (November 18, 1872 – April 17, 1968) was an American stage and film actress.

== Biography ==
She appeared in more than 100 films between 1915 and 1951. Her most memorable role was perhaps as one of The Pixilated Sisters, a comedic stage act with actress Margaret McWade. In 1936, they reprised their roles in the film Mr Deeds Goes to Town. On Broadway, Seddon performed in Modern Marriage (1911) and The Things That Count (1913). She was born in Washington, D.C., and died in Philadelphia, Pennsylvania.

== Selected filmography ==
- The Dawn of a Tomorrow (1915) - Polly
- The Old Homestead (1915) - Rickety Ann
- Miss Robinson Crusoe (1917) - Aunt Eloise
- The Girl Without A Soul (1917) - Henrietta Hateman
- The Land of Promise (1917) - Miss Pringle
- The Unveiling Hand (1919) - Mrs. Bellamy
- The Country Cousin (1919) - Mrs. Howitt
- The Miracle of Money (1920) - Patricia Hodges
- Wings of Pride (1920) - Mrs. Prentice
- Headin' Home (1920) - Babe's Mother
- The Inside of the Cup (1921) - Mrs. Garvin
- The Highest Law (1921) - Mrs. Goodwin
- The Man Worth While (1921) - Mrs. Ward
- The Case of Becky (1921) - Mrs. Emerson
- The Blasphemer (1921) - Mrs. Harden - John's Mother
- Just Around the Corner (1921) - Ma Birdsong
- A Man's Home (1921) - Amanda Green
- School Days (1921) - His Teacher
- Boomerang Bill (1922) - Annie's Mother
- Sonny (1922) - Mrs. Crosby
- Timothy's Quest (1922) - Samantha Ann Ripley
- The Man Who Played God (1922) - Old Woman
- The Lights of New York (1922) - Mrs. Reid
- Women Men Marry (1922) - Hetty Page
- Brass (1923) - Mrs. Baldwin
- Little Church Around the Corner (1923) - Mrs. Wallace
- The Bright Shawl (1923) - Carmencita Escobar
- Little Johnny Jones (1923) - Mrs. Jones
- The Gold Diggers (1923) - Mrs. La Mar
- Through the Dark (1924) - Mother McGinn
- A Lady of Quality (1924) - Lady Daphne Wildairs
- The Human Terror (1924)
- Women Who Give (1924) - Ma Keeler
- The Night Message (1924) - Mrs. Longstreet
- The Confidence Man (1924) - Mrs. X
- The Snob (1924) - Mrs. Curry
- The Lady (1925) - Mrs. Cairns
- New Lives for Old (1925) - Widow Turrene
- On the Threshold (1925) - Martha McKay
- A Broadway Butterfly (1925) - Mrs. Steel
- Proud Flesh (1925) - Mrs. O'Malley
- The Midshipman (1925) - Mrs. Randall
- Wages for Wives (1925) - Annie Bailey
- The Golden Cocoon (1925) - Mrs. Shannon
- Wild Oats Lane (1926) - The Mother
- Things Wives Tell (1926)
- Rolling Home (1926) - Mrs. Alden
- Blarney (1926) - Peggy's Aunt
- The Nickel-Hopper (1926, Short) - Paddy's Mother
- A Regular Scout (1926) - Mrs. Monroe
- Driven from Home (1927)
- Matinee Ladies (1927) - Mrs. Smith
- White Pants Willie (1927) - Winifred Barnes
- Quality Street (1927) - Nancy Willoughby
- Home Made (1927) - Mrs. White
- Silk Legs (1927) - Mrs. Fulton
- Gentlemen Prefer Blondes (1928) - Lorelei's Mother
- The Actress (1928) - Miss Trafalgar Gower
- The Bellamy Trial (1929) - Mother Ives
- She Goes to War (1929) - Tom's Mother
- Dance Hall (1929) - Mrs. Flynn
- Gold Diggers of Broadway (1929) - Jerry’s Mother
- After the Fog (1929) - Letitia Barker
- The Dude Wrangler (1930) - Aunt Mary
- Dancing Sweeties (1930) - Mrs. Cleaver
- Divorce Among Friends (1930) - Maid
- Smilin' Through (1932) - Ellen
- If I Had a Million (1932) - Mrs. Small - Idylwood Resident (uncredited)
- Bachelor Mother (1932) - Cynthia Wilson
- Broadway Bad (1933) - Bixby (uncredited)
- Lilly Turner (1933) - Mrs. Turner
- The Return of Casey Jones (1933) - Mrs. Mary Martin
- Heroes for Sale (1933) - Jeanette Holmes
- Midshipman Jack (1933) - Mrs. Burns
- Walls of Gold (1933) - Mrs. Satterlee
- The Worst Woman in Paris? (1933) - Mrs. John Strong
- Shock (1934) - Housekeeper (uncredited)
- Babes in Toyland (1934) - Widow Piper (uncredited)
- David Copperfield (1935) - Dora's Aunt (uncredited)
- The Flame Within (1935) - Mrs. Ida Grenfell
- Two Sinners (1935) - Mrs. Summerstone
- The Girl Friend (1935) - Grandma Henry
- It's in the Air (1935) - Mrs. Martha (uncredited)
- Mr. Deeds Goes to Town (1936) - Jane Faulkner (uncredited)
- The Big Game (1936) - Mother Jenkins (uncredited)
- A Woman Rebels (1936) - Serena (uncredited)
- Let's Make a Million (1936) - Aunt Martha
- College Holiday (1936) - Mrs. Schloggenheimer
- The Road Back (1937) - Mother (uncredited)
- Danger - Love at Work (1937) - Aunt Pitty
- Breakfast for Two (1937) - Stockholder (uncredited)
- Having Wonderful Time (1938) - Mrs. G (scenes deleted)
- Raffles (1939) - Maud Holden
- The Hunchback of Notre Dame (1939) - Older Sister (uncredited)
- Dr. Kildare's Strange Case (1940) - Mrs. Julia Cray, Skin Allergy Patient
- Strike Up the Band (1940) - Old Lady (scenes deleted)
- Friendly Neighbors (1940) - Martha Williams
- The Bank Dick (1940) - Old Lady in Car (uncredited)
- Dr. Kildare's Wedding Day (1941) - Mrs. Bartlett
- Roxie Hart (1942) - Mrs. Wadsworth (uncredited)
- The Remarkable Andrew (1942) - Mrs. Kelly (uncredited)
- The Wife Takes a Flyer (1942) - The Twin
- Take a Letter, Darling (1942) - Aunt Judy
- Scattergood Survives a Murder (1942) - Cynthia Quentin
- The Meanest Man in the World (1943) - Mrs. Frances H. Leggitt
- Sherlock Holmes in Washington (1943) - Miss Pringle (uncredited)
- Honeymoon Lodge (1943) - Elderly Woman (uncredited)
- I Dood It (1943) - Woman Sitting Next to Joseph (uncredited)
- House by the River (1950) - Mrs. Whittaker - Party Guest
- Three Desperate Men (1951) - Mrs. Denton
