= Sure Fire Flint =

1922 film directed by Dell Henderson

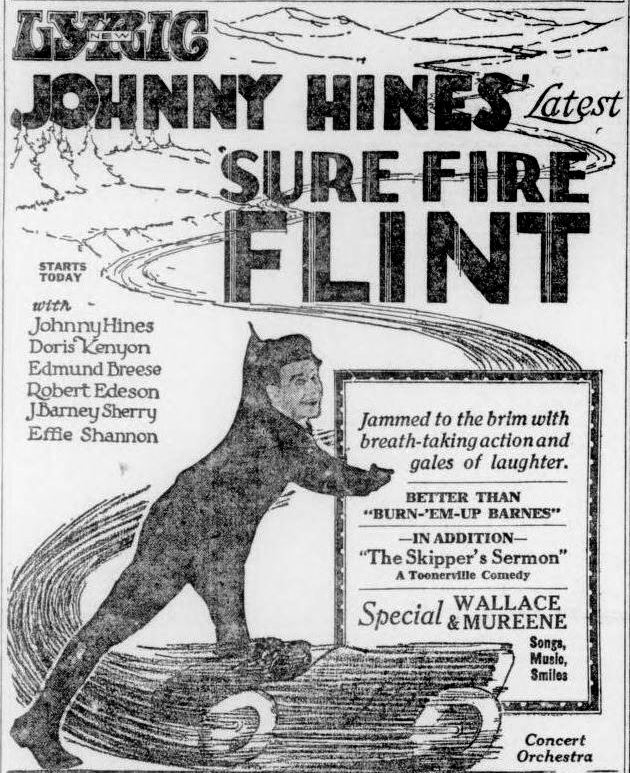
- Newspaper advertisement
- Directed by: Dell Henderson
- Written by: Gerald C. Duffy; Ralph Spence
- Based on: short story Sure Fire Flint by Gerald C. Duffy in Ace High Magazine 1922
- Produced by: Mastodon Films; C.C. Burr
- Starring: Johnny Hines; Robert Edeson
- Cinematography: Billy Bitzer; Charles Gibson; Neil Sullivan
- Release date: August 25, 1922
- Running time: 7 reels
- Country: United States
- Language: Silent (English intertitles)

Sure Fire Flint is a 1922 American silent comedy film directed by Dell Henderson and starring Johnny Hines.

== Cast ==
- Johnny Hines as Sure Fire Flint
- Edmund Breese as Johnny Jets
- Robert Edeson as Anthony De Lanni
- Effie Shannon as Mrs. De Lanni
- J. Barney Sherry as The Proud Father
- Doris Kenyon as June De Lanni
- Charles K. Gerrard as Digby Poole

== Preservation ==
With no prints of Sure Fire Flint located in any film archives, it is considered a lost film.
