= The Speed Spook =

1924 film

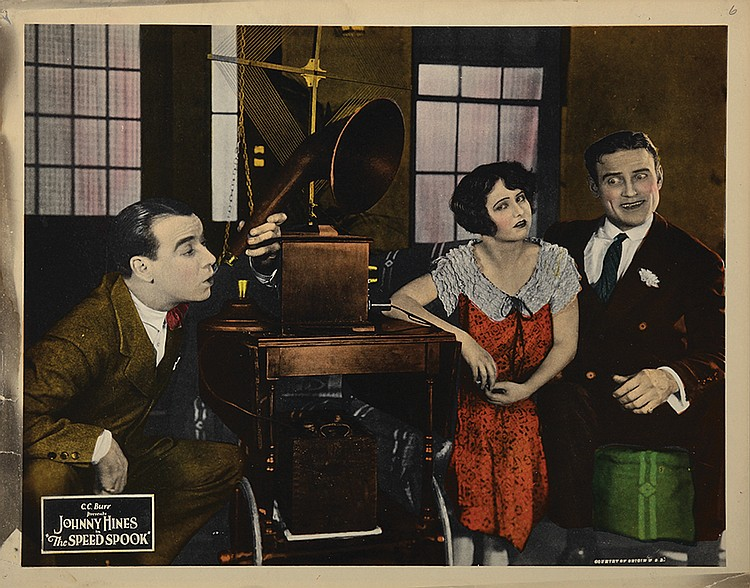
- Directed by: Charles Hines
- Written by: William Wallace Cook; Ray Harris; Ralph Spence
- Produced by: C.C. Burr
- Starring: Johnny Hines; Faire Binney; Edmund Breese
- Cinematography: John Geisel; Charles E. Gilson
- Production company: C.C. Burr Productions
- Distributed by: East Coast Productions; FBO Pictures (UK)
- Release date: August 30, 1924
- Running time: 85 minutes
- Country: United States
- Languages: Silent; English intertitles
- Box office: $29,156.75

The Speed Spook is a 1924 American silent comedy film directed by Charles Hines and starring Johnny Hines, Faire Binney and Edmund Breese.

== Cast ==
- Johnny Hines as 'Blue Streak' Billings
- Faire Binney as Betty West
- Edmund Breese as Chuck Brady
- Warner Richmond as Jud Skerrit
- Frank Losee as Sheriff West
- Henry West as Hiram Smith

== Bibliography ==
- Munden, Kenneth White. The American Film Institute Catalog of Motion Pictures Produced in the United States, Part 1. University of California Press, 1997.
