= The Wright Idea =

1928 film

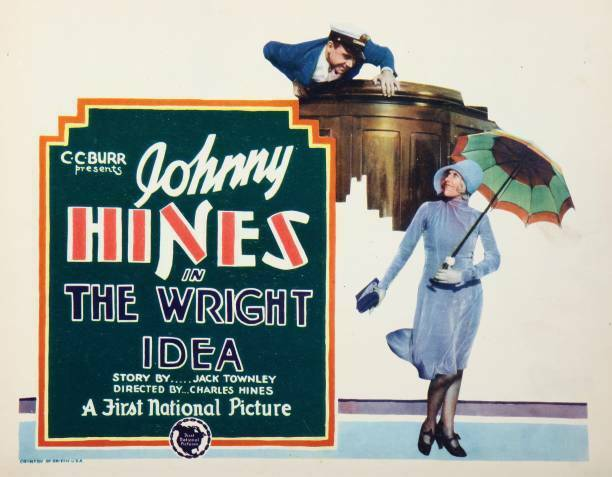
- Lobby card
- Directed by: Charles Hines
- Written by: Paul Perez; Jack Townley
- Produced by: C.C. Burr
- Starring: Johnny Hines; Louise Lorraine; Edmund Breese
- Cinematography: William Miller; Al Wilson
- Edited by: George Amy
- Production company: C.C. Burr Productions
- Distributed by: First National Pictures
- Release date: August 5, 1928
- Running time: 70 minutes
- Country: United States
- Language: Silent (English intertitles)

The Wright Idea is a 1928 American silent comedy film directed by Charles Hines and starring Johnny Hines, Louise Lorraine, and Edmund Breese.

== Cast ==
- Johnny Hines as Johnny Wright
- Louise Lorraine as Helen
- Edmund Breese as Mr. Filbert
- Walter James as Capt. Sandy
- Fred Kelsey as M.T. Flatt
- Henry A. Barrows as Mr. Smoot
- Henry Hebert as Mr. Stein
- Charles Giblyn as Mr. Carter
- Jack McHugh as Spec
- J. Barney Sherry as O.J. Gude
- Charles K. Gerrard as Mr. Roberts
- Betty Westmore as Betty
- Blanche Craig as Mrs. O'Toole
- Richard Maitland as Mr. Saunders

== Bibliography ==
- Connelly, Robert B. The Silents: Silent Feature Films, 1910–36, Volume 40, Issue 2. December Press, 1998.
- Munden, Kenneth White. The American Film Institute Catalog of Motion Pictures Produced in the United States, Part 1. University of California Press, 1997.
