= George Amy =

American film editor (1903–1986)

- Born: George Joseph Amy; October 15, 1903; Brooklyn, New York, U.S.
- Died: December 18, 1986 (aged 83); Los Angeles, California, U.S.
- Occupation: Film editor
- Years active: 1920s–1950s

George Joseph Amy (October 15, 1903 – December 18, 1986) was an American film editor. He was born in Brooklyn, New York, and started his career at the age of 17, finding his niche at Warner Brothers in the 1930s. It was Amy's editing that was one of the main reasons Warners' films got their reputation for their fluid style and breakneck pace.

He was a favorite of such top Warners directors as Michael Curtiz and Howard Hawks, and won an Academy Award for Best Film Editing for Hawks' Air Force (1943). He received Oscar nominations for Curtiz's Yankee Doodle Dandy in 1942 and Raoul Walsh's fanciful war film Objective, Burma! in 1945. Although Amy directed several shorts and a few features (including She Had to Say Yes) on his own for Warners, they didn't meet with much success. In the 1950s, he turned to editing and directing for television.

== Selected filmography ==
- Burn 'Em Up Barnes (1921)
- Rainbow Riley (1926)
- The Brown Derby (1926)
- The Wright Idea (1928)
- Those Who Dance (1930)
- The Ruling Voice (1931)
- Dr. X (1932)
- Cabin in the Cotton (1932)
- 20,000 Years in Sing Sing (1933)
- Footlight Parade (1933)
- She Had to Say Yes (1933) (also co-director)
- Gold Diggers of 1933 (1933)
- Lady Killer (1933)
- Wonder Bar (1934)
- Here Comes the Navy (1934)
- He Was Her Man (1934)
- Broadway Gondolier (1935)
- Captain Blood (1935)
- Gold Diggers of 1935 (1935)
- Charge of the Light Brigade (1936)
- Mountain Justice (1937)
- Kid Galahad (1937)
- Varsity Show (1937)
- Hollywood Hotel (1938)
- Garden of the Moon (1938)
- Gold Diggers in Paris (1938)
- Kid Nightingale (1939)
- Dodge City (1939)
- The Sea Hawk (1939)
- Gambling on the High Seas (1940) (also director)
- Granny Get Your Gun (1940) (also director)
- Virginia City (1940)
- The Letter (1940)
- The Santa Fe Trail (1940)
- The Sea Wolf (1941)
- Dive Bomber (1941)
- Captains of the Clouds (1942)
- Yankee Doodle Dandy (1942)
- Air Force (1943)
- Action in the North Atlantic (1943)
- This Is the Army (1943)
- Uncertain Glory (1944)
- Objective, Burma! (1945)
- Confidential Agent (1945)
- Three Strangers (1946)
- Cinderella Jones (1946)
- Life with Father (1947)
- Romance on the High Seas (1948) (also assoc. producer)
- Flamingo Road (1949)
- My Dream Is Yours (1949)
- Clash by Night (1952)
- A Lion Is in the Streets (1953)
