= Stepping Along =

1926 film

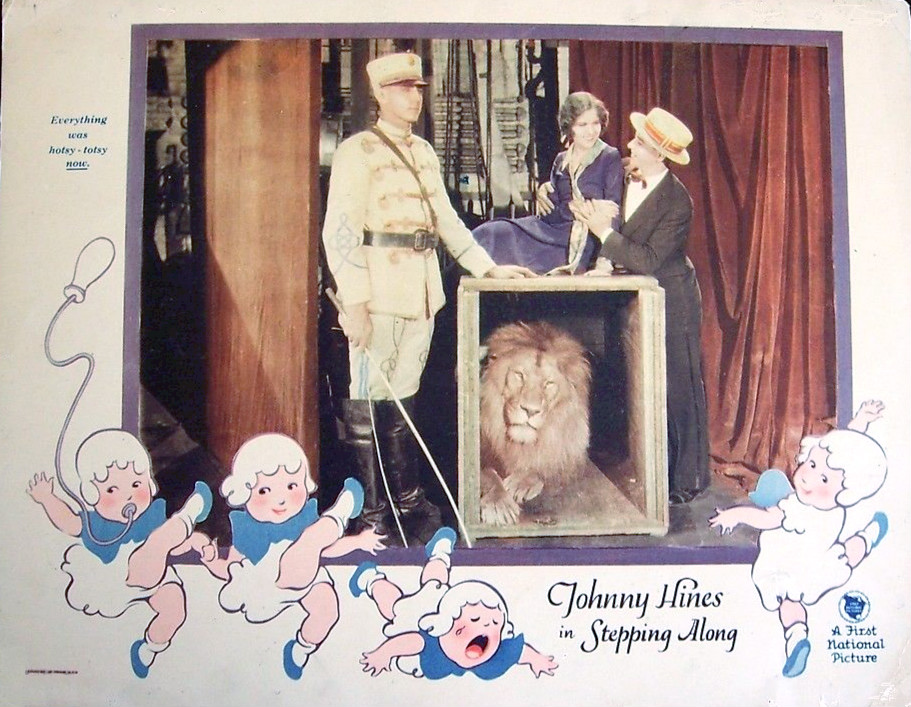
- Lobby card
- Directed by: Charles Hines
- Written by: Matt Taylor
- Produced by: C.C. Burr
- Starring: Johnny Hines; Mary Brian; William Gaxton
- Cinematography: George Peters; Albert Wetzel; Al Wilson
- Production company: C.C. Burr Productions
- Distributed by: First National Pictures
- Release date: November 14, 1926
- Running time: 70 minutes
- Country: United States
- Languages: Silent; English intertitles

Stepping Along is a 1926 American silent comedy film directed by Charles Hines and starring Johnny Hines, Mary Brian, and William Gaxton.

== Cast ==
- Johnny Hines as Johnny Rooney
- Mary Brian as Molly Taylor
- William Gaxton as Frank Moreland
- Ruth Dwyer as Fay Allen
- Edmund Breese as Prince Ferdinand Darowitsky
- Dan Mason as Mike
- Lee Beggs as Boss O'Brien

== Preservation ==
With no prints of Stepping Along located in any film archives, it is a lost film.

== Bibliography ==
- Munden, Kenneth White. The American Film Institute Catalog of Motion Pictures Produced in the United States, Part 1. University of California Press, 1997.
