= White Pants Willie =

1927 film

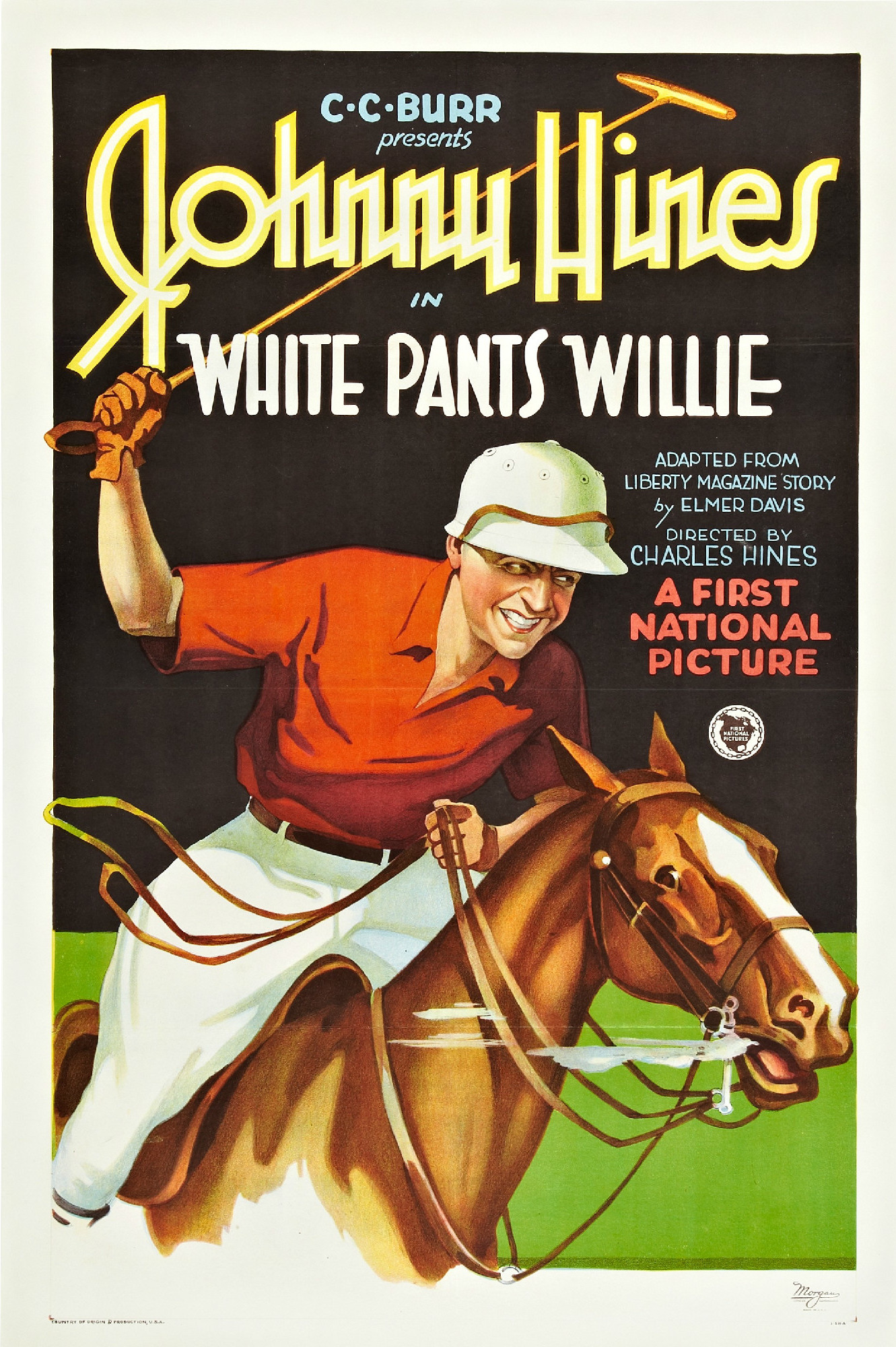
- Theatrical release poster
- Directed by: Charles Hines
- Screenplay by: Howard J. Green
- Based on: White Pants Willie by Elmer Davis
- Produced by: C.C. Burr
- Starring: Johnny Hines; Leila Hyams; Henry A. Barrows; Ruth Dwyer; Walter Long; Margaret Seddon
- Cinematography: James Diamond
- Production company: C.C. Burr Productions Inc.
- Distributed by: First National Pictures
- Release date: July 24, 1927
- Running time: 70 minutes
- Country: United States
- Language: English

White Pants Willie is a 1927 American comedy film directed by Charles Hines and written by Howard J. Green. It is based on the 1924 novel White Pants Willie by Elmer Davis. The film stars Johnny Hines, Leila Hyams, Henry A. Barrows, Ruth Dwyer, Walter Long and Margaret Seddon. The film was released on July 24, 1927, by First National Pictures.

== Cast ==
- Johnny Hines as Willie Bascom
- Leila Hyams as Helen Charters
- Henry A. Barrows as Philip Charters
- Ruth Dwyer as Judy
- Walter Long as Mock Epply
- Margaret Seddon as Winifred Barnes
- George Kuwa as Wong Lee
- Bozo the Goose as Peaches
