= Chinatown Charlie =

1928 film

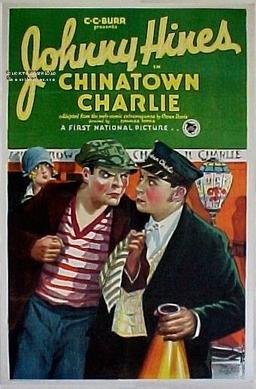
- Theatrical poster
- Directed by: Charles Hines
- Written by: Roland Asher; John Grey; Paul Perez (titles)
- Based on: story by Owen Davis
- Produced by: C.C. Burr
- Starring: Johnny Hines
- Cinematography: William J. Miller; Al Wilson
- Production company: C. C. Burr Productions
- Distributed by: First National Pictures
- Release date: April 15, 1928
- Country: United States
- Languages: Silent; English intertitles

Chinatown Charlie is a 1928 silent film comedy directed by Charles Hines for release by First National Pictures. It stars actor Johnny Hines.

== Cast ==
- Johnny Hines - Charlie
- Louise Lorraine - Annie Gordon
- Harry Gribbon - Red Mike
- Fred Kohler - Monk
- Sojin Kamiyama - The Mandarin
- Scooter Lowry - Oswald
- Anna May Wong - Mandarin's Sweetheart
- George Kuwa - Hip Sing Toy
- John Burdette - Gyp

== Status ==
One source states that a fragment and/or video copy survives of this picture at UCLA Film & Television Archive. Another source claims that it is lost.
