= Home Made (1927 film) =

1927 film

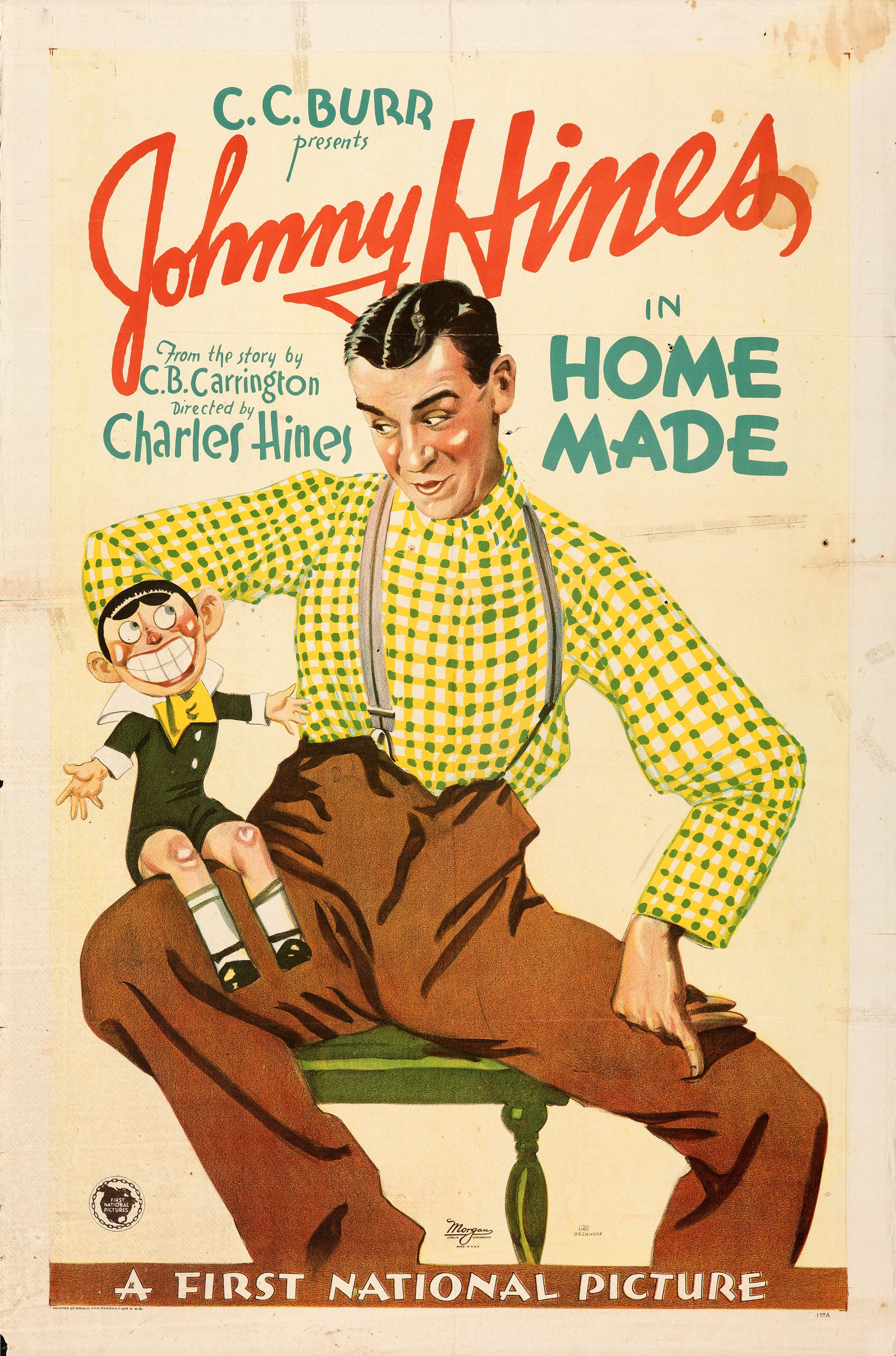
- Poster
- Directed by: Charles Hines
- Written by: Paul Perez; C. Carrington
- Produced by: C.C. Burr
- Starring: Johnny Hines; Margaret Seddon; DeWitt Jennings
- Cinematography: William Miller; Al Wilson
- Production company: C.C. Burr Productions
- Distributed by: First National Pictures
- Release date: November 30, 1927
- Running time: 7 reels
- Country: United States
- Language: Silent (English intertitles)

Home Made is a 1927 American silent comedy film directed by Charles Hines and starring Johnny Hines, Margaret Seddon, and DeWitt Jennings.

== Cast ==
- Johnny Hines as Johnny White
- Margaret Seddon as Mrs. White
- DeWitt Jennings as Mr. White
- Maude Turner Gordon as Mrs. Fenton
- Edmund Breese as Mr. Tilford
- Marjorie Daw as The Girl
- Charles K. Gerrard as Robert Van Dorn

== Preservation ==
With no prints of Home Made located in any film archives, it is a lost film.

== Bibliography ==
- Munden, Kenneth White. The American Film Institute Catalog of Motion Pictures Produced in the United States, Part 1. University of California Press, 1997.
