= Rainbow Riley =

1926 film

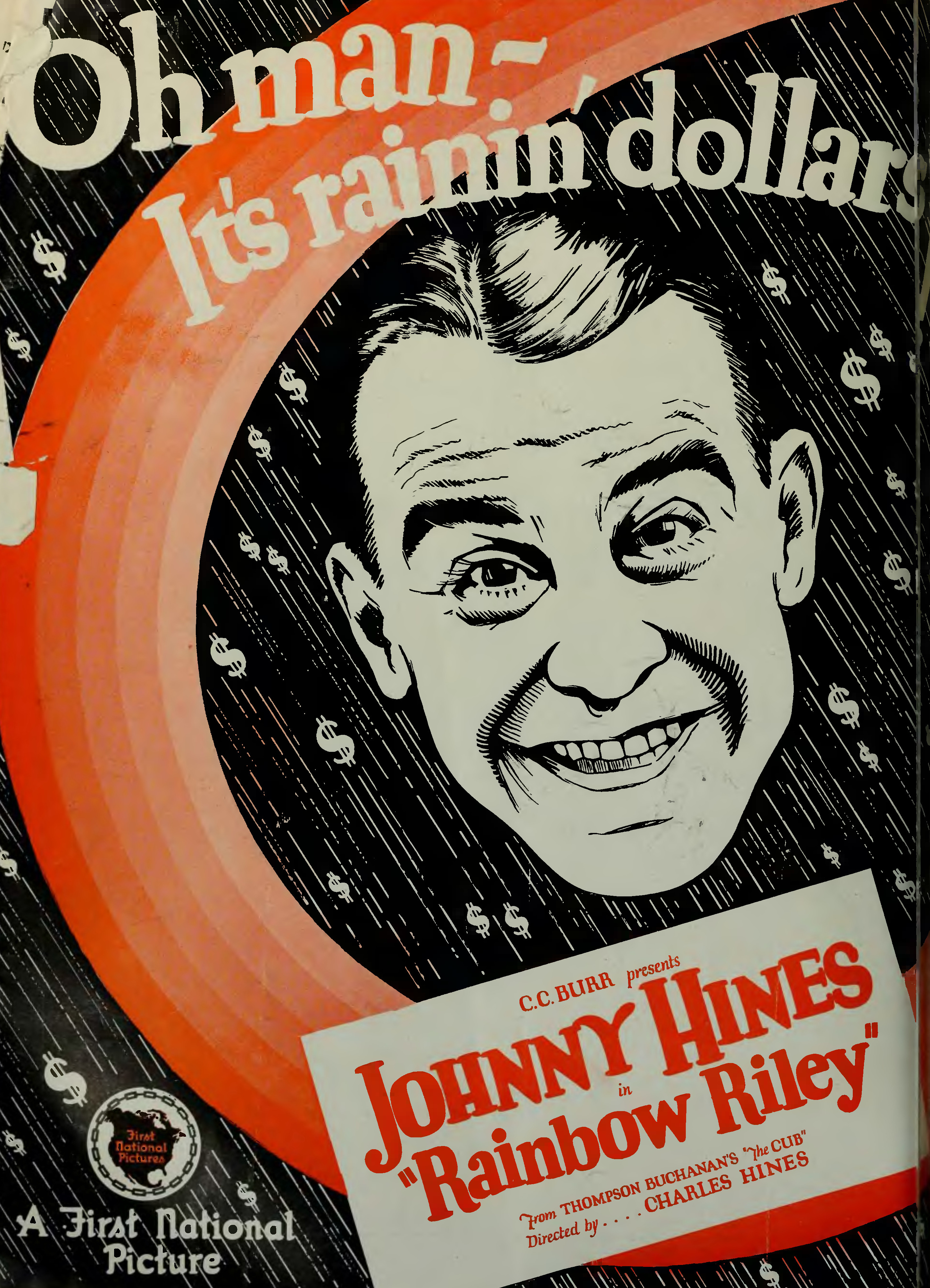
- Advertisement
- Directed by: Charles Hines
- Written by: John W. Krafft
- Based on: The Cub by Thompson Buchanan
- Produced by: C.C. Burr
- Starring: Johnny Hines; Brenda Bond; Bradley Barker
- Cinematography: Charles E. Gilson; William Wallace; Albert Wetzel
- Edited by: George Amy; John W. Krafft
- Production company: C.C. Burr Productions
- Distributed by: First National Pictures
- Release date: February 7, 1926
- Running time: 70 minutes
- Country: United States
- Language: Silent (English intertitles)

Rainbow Riley is a 1926 American silent comedy film directed by Charles Hines and starring Johnny Hines, Brenda Bond, and Bradley Barker.

== Plot ==
As described in a film magazine review, Steve Riley, a cub reporter, is sent out to cover a feud between two large families. He becomes the enemy of both, because he wishes to marry Alice, a young woman from one family, and does not wish to marry a young woman of the other, even though she loves him. After a series of dangerous adventures, he is rescued. He returns to the office of his paper with a big story and a new wife.

== Cast ==
- Johnny Hines as Steve Riley
- Brenda Bond as Alice Ripper
- Bradley Barker as Tilden McFields
- Dan Mason as Dr. Lem Perkins
- John F. Hamilton as Halfwit
- Harlan Knight as Zeb White
- Herbert Standing as Newspaper Editor (*more than likely Herbert Standing Jr.)
- Ben F. Wilson as Capt. Jones
- Lillian Ardell as Becky

== Preservation ==
A fragment of Rainbow Riley is held in the UCLA Film and Television Archive.

== Bibliography ==
- Munden, Kenneth White. The American Film Institute Catalog of Motion Pictures Produced in the United States, Part 1. University of California Press, 1997.
