= All Aboard (1927 film) =

1927 film

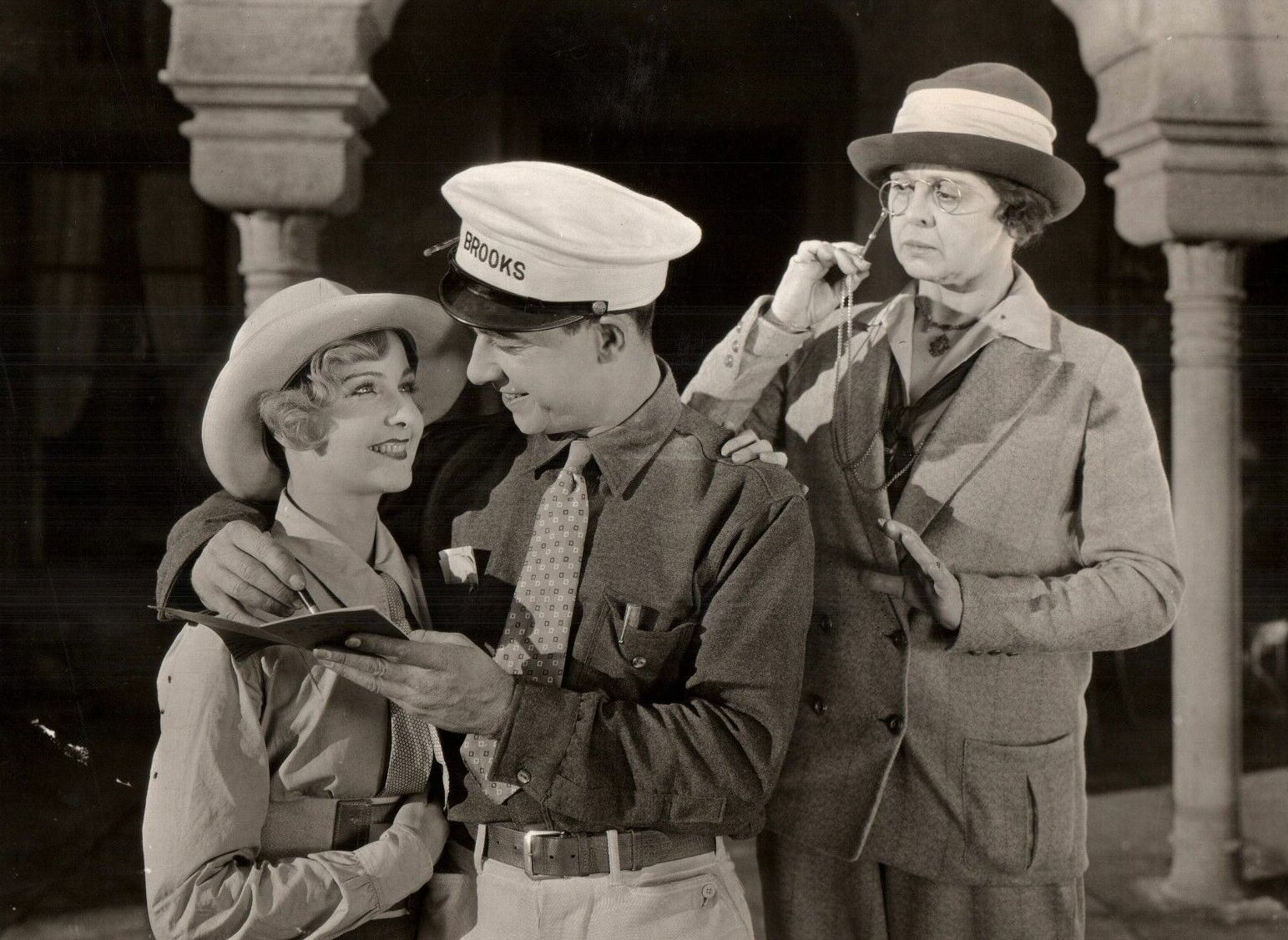
- Publicity image featuring Murphy, Hines, and Farley
- Directed by: Charles Hines
- Screenplay by: Matt Taylor
- Produced by: C.C. Burr
- Starring: Johnny Hines; Edna Murphy; Dot Farley; Henry A. Barrows; Frank Hagney; Babe London
- Cinematography: George Peters
- Production companies: B & H Enterprises
- Distributed by: First National Pictures
- Release date: May 1, 1927
- Running time: 66 minutes
- Country: United States
- Language: Silent (English intertitles)

All Aboard is a 1927 American silent comedy film directed by Charles Hines and written by Matt Taylor. The film stars Johnny Hines, Edna Murphy, Dot Farley, Henry A. Barrows, Frank Hagney, and Babe London. The film was released on May 1, 1927, by First National Pictures.

== Cast ==
- Johnny Hines as Johnny
- Edna Murphy as May Brooks
- Dot Farley as Aunt Patsy
- Henry A. Barrows as Thomas Brooks
- Frank Hagney as Ali Ben Ome
- Babe London as Princess
- Sojin as Prince
- James Leonard as El Humid

== Preservation ==
With no prints of All Aboard located in any film archives, it is a lost film. In February of 2021, the film was cited by the National Film Preservation Board on their Lost U.S. Silent Feature Films list.
