= A Gentleman of Leisure (disambiguation) =

A Gentleman of Leisure is a novel by P. G. Wodehouse.

A Gentleman of Leisure may also refer to:

- A Gentleman of Leisure (1915 film), a film directed by George Melford
- A Gentleman of Leisure (1923 film), a film directed by Joseph Henabery
