= Slippy McGee =

Slippy McGee may refer to:

- Slippy McGee (1923 film), an American silent drama film
- Slippy McGee (1948 film), an American crime film
