= Sigrid Holmquist =

Swedish actress

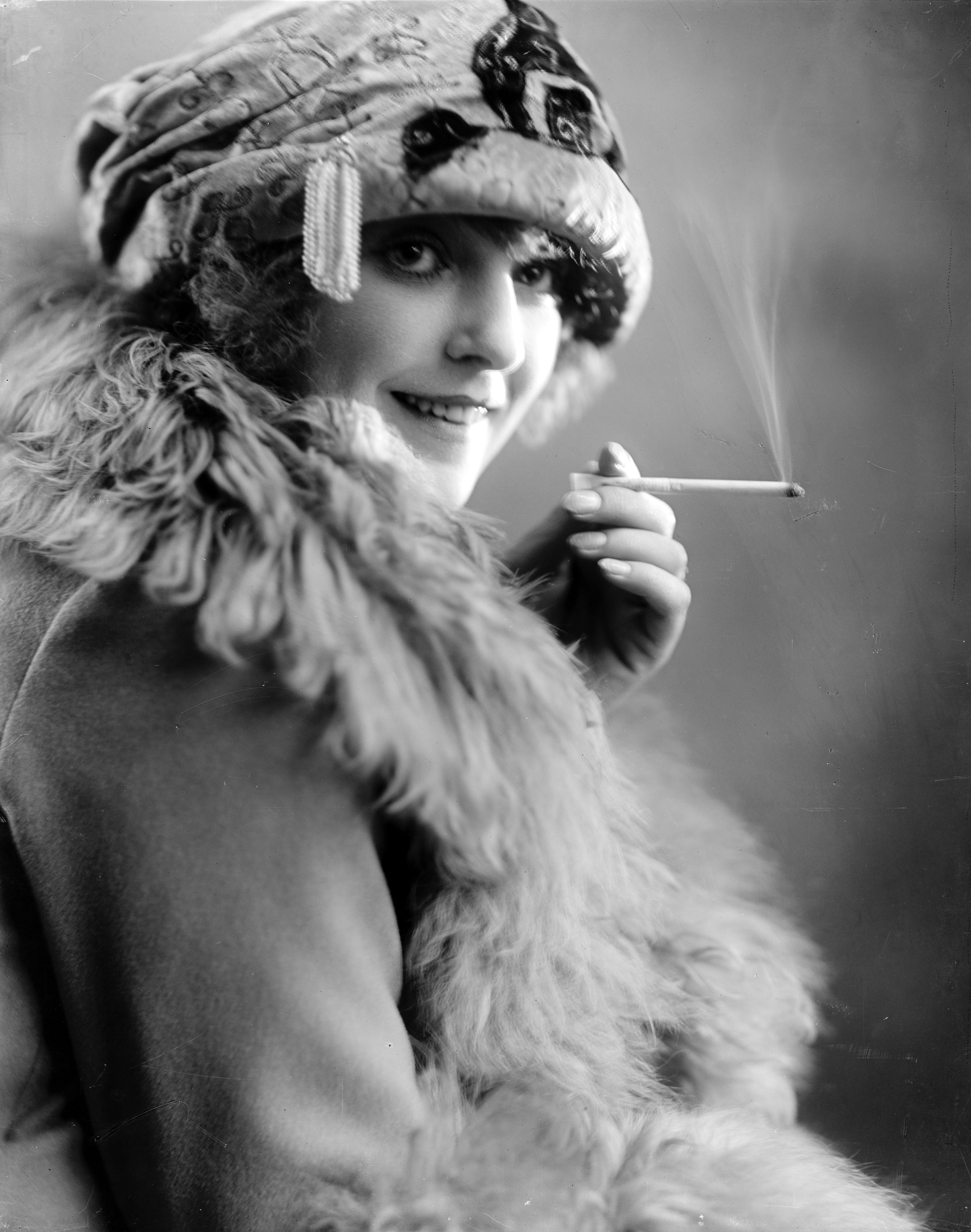
- Born: 21 February 1899; Borås, Sweden
- Died: 9 July 1970 (aged 71); Sydney, Australia
- Occupation: Actress

Sigrid Holmquist (21 February 1899, in Borås – 9 July 1970, in Sydney, Australia), also known by the diminutive "Sie" or "Bie" Holmquist was a Swedish actress during the silent film era. After three films in Sweden, she went to pursue a career in Hollywood. She appeared in 18 films between 1920 and 1927 before retiring from the screen.

== Career in Sweden ==
Educated in a Danish convent, the 10-year-old Holmquist was vacationing in Great Britain with her parents when they were approached by Sydney Chaplin, brother to Charles, later Charlie Chaplin. The film actor offered to feature the attractive child in a screen role, which the parents declined. Holmquist was intrigued by the encounter and became determined to pursue a career as a movie actor.

In 1920, at the age of 21, Holmquist had appeared in several Swedish films, three of which have been identified. She debuted in Karlek Och Bjornjakt, and then starred in two other comedic pictures: Robinson i skärgården and Flickorna Fran Are. On the merits of her performance in these films, Holmquist became known as "Sweden’s Sweetheart".

== Hollywood career ==
Holmquist's enlistment by Paramount was prompted in part by the early retirement of Marguerite Clark, the only genuine rival to United Artists’ screen star Mary Pickford. As such, Paramount promoted Holmquist as "Sweden’s Mary Pickford". At the peak of her success, she was earning over $2500 a week and owned "3 cars, each with a chauffeur, a country house and a townhouse".

In her American debut, Holmquiest was cast as a working-class girl in the romantic comedy Just Around the Corner (1921) in which she wins the devotion of a wealthy playboy. After making two more box-office successes—My Old Kentucky Home (1922) and A Gentleman of Leisure (1923)—Paramount miscast Holmquist in an adaptation of Rudyard Kipling's The Light That Failed (1923). Disparaged by reviewers, she departed Paramount and was limited to working on poverty row productions. Holmquist was repeatedly offered minor ingénue roles, but enjoyed performances in three successful 1925 comedies, two of which co-starred Johnny Hines: The Early Bird and The Crackerjack.

Holmquist left Hollywood in 1925, at age 26. Film historian Hans J. Wollstein reports that she may have suffered from “Klieg eyes”, a debilitating occupational malady caused by the bright arc lamps used to illuminate movie sets. She briefly appeared before the camera in the late 1920s as a fashion model, a single-reel 1927 color commercial production.

== Personal life ==
Holmquist was married twice. First to banker Arthur Cox in 1928, who committed suicide after losing his fortune in the panic of 1929. By 1936, during the Great Depression, the New York Post reported that the former screen star was discovered to be living in strained economic circumstances. Holmquiest's second marriage was to restaurateur Anthony Cirici in 1939. The couple moved to Sydney, Australia in 1941, where she became a successful business entrepreneur.

Sigrid Holmquist died in Sydney on July 9, 1970.

== Filmography ==
Year	Title	Role	Notes
1920	Robinson i skärgården	Brita's sister, the newlywed	
1921	Just Around the Corner	Essie Birdsong	
1922	The Prophet's Paradise	Mary Talbot	Lost film
1922	My Old Kentucky Home	Virginia Sanders	Lost film
1923	A Gentleman of Leisure	Molly Creedon	Lost film
1923	Hollywood	Herself	Lost film
1923	The Light That Failed	Maisie Wells	Lost film
1924	Youth for Sale	Connie Sutton	Lost film
1924	The Age of Innocence		Lost film
1924	Meddling Women	Grace Ainsworth	
1924	Two Shall Be Born	Janet Van Wyck	Lost film
1925	The Early Bird	Jean Blair	
1925	School for Wives	Betty Lynch	Lost film
1925	The Crackerjack	Rose Bannon	
1926	The Men Women Love	Madame Nola	Lost film
