= Thus Is Life =

1930 film

Thus is Life
- Spanish: Así es la vida
- Directed by: George Crone
- Written by: E. J. Rath (novel); Jorge Juan Crespo; Harvey Gates; Tom Gibson
- Produced by: O. E. Goebel; George W. Weeks
- Starring: José Bohr; Delia Magana; Lolita Vendrell; César Vanoni
- Cinematography: Arthur L. Todd
- Edited by: Arthur Tavares
- Music by: Carlos Molina
- Production company: Sono-Art Productions
- Distributed by: Sono-Art Productions
- Release date: May 3, 1930
- Running time: 72 minutes
- Country: United States
- Language: Spanish

Thus is Life (Spanish: Así es la vida) is a 1930 American Spanish language romantic comedy film directed by George Crone and starring José Bohr, Delia Magana and Lolita Vendrell. It was produced as the Spanish version of the English language film What a Man!, also directed by Crone. In the early years of sound such multi-language versions were common, and only declined with the development of dubbing.

== Plot ==
A British ex-Grenadier Guards officer moves to America, but struggles to find work. After he is employed as a chauffeur to a wealthy family, he falls in love with his employer's daughter.

== Cast ==
- José Bohr as José Rolan
- Delia Magaña as Luisa Franklyn
- Lolita Vendrell as Blanca Franklyn
- César Vanoni as Manuel
- Enrique Acosta as Señor Franklyn
- Marcela Nivón as Señora Franklyn
- Tito Davison as Jorge Franklyn
- Myrta Bonillas as La contessa
- Julian Rivero as Calton
- Ernesto Piedra as Sapo
- Rosita Gil as Cora
