= The Nervous Wreck =

1926 film

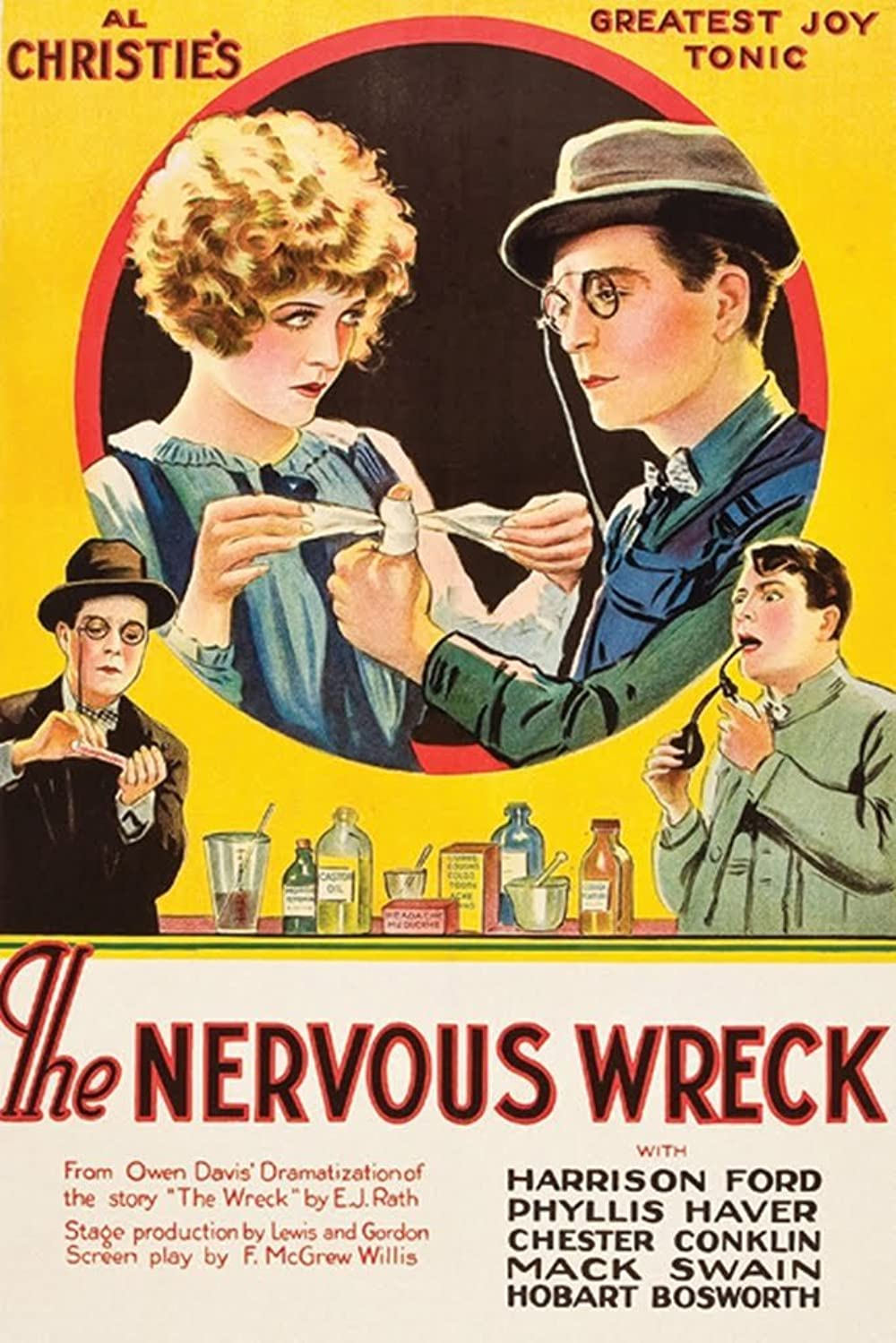
- Directed by: Scott Sidney
- Written by: F. McGrew Willis
- Based on: The Nervous Wreck by Owen Davis
- Produced by: Al Christie; Charles Christie
- Starring: Harrison Ford; Phyllis Haver; Chester Conklin
- Cinematography: Alex Phillips
- Production company: Christie Film Company
- Distributed by: Producers Distributing Corporation
- Release date: October 10, 1926
- Running time: 70 minutes
- Country: United States
- Languages: Silent; English intertitles

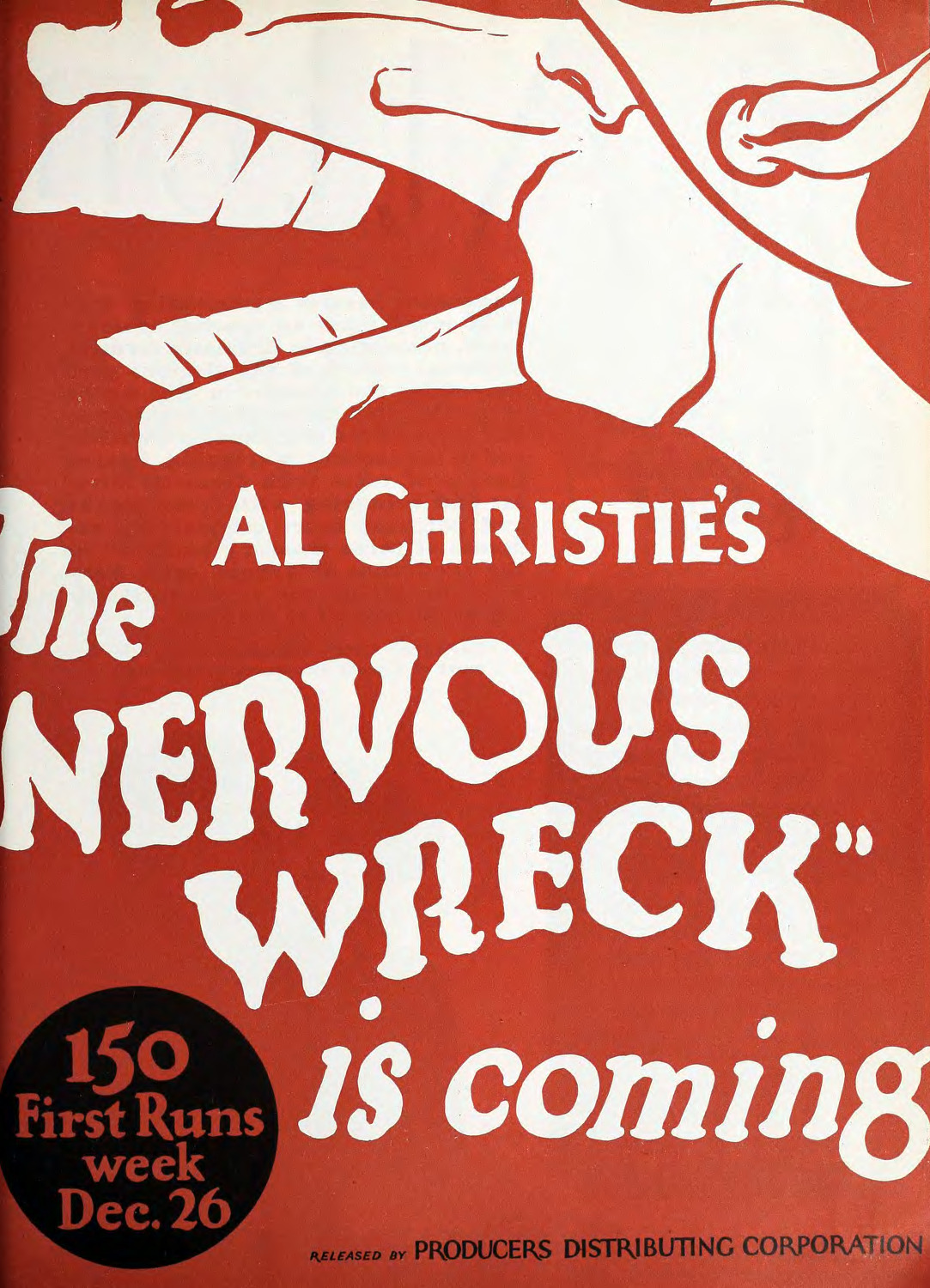
The Nervous Wreck ad in Exhibitors Herald, 1926

The Nervous Wreck is a 1926 American silent comedy adventure film directed by Scott Sidney and starring Harrison Ford, Phyllis Haver and Chester Conklin. It is based on the play The Nervous Wreck by Owen Davis, inspired by an earlier story The Wreck by E.J. Rath. The play later became a musical on which the 1930 film Whoopee! was based and also inspired the 1944 film Up in Arms.

== Plot ==
Wrongly believing himself to be suffering from a fatal illness, a Pittsburgh man sets out for Arizona but stops at a ranch for a meal on the way. There he is tricked into eloping with the daughter of the house, engaged to a local sheriff. The couple are subsequently pursued by the sheriff and the girl's father, and during a series of adventures he discovers that his poor health was all in his mind.

== Cast ==
- Harrison Ford as Henry Williams
- Phyllis Haver as Sally Morgan
- Chester Conklin as Mort
- Mack Swain as Jerome Underwood
- Hobart Bosworth as Jud Morgan
- Paul Nicholson as Bob Wells
- Vera Steadman as Harriet Underwood
- Charles K. Gerrard as Reggie De Vere
- Clarence Burton as Andy McNab

== Bibliography ==
- Connelly, Robert B. The Silents: Silent Feature Films, 1910-36, Volume 40, Issue 2. December Press, 1998.
- Munden, Kenneth White. The American Film Institute Catalog of Motion Pictures Produced in the United States, Part 1. University of California Press, 1997.
