= Just Around the Corner (1921 film) =

1921 film by Frances Marion

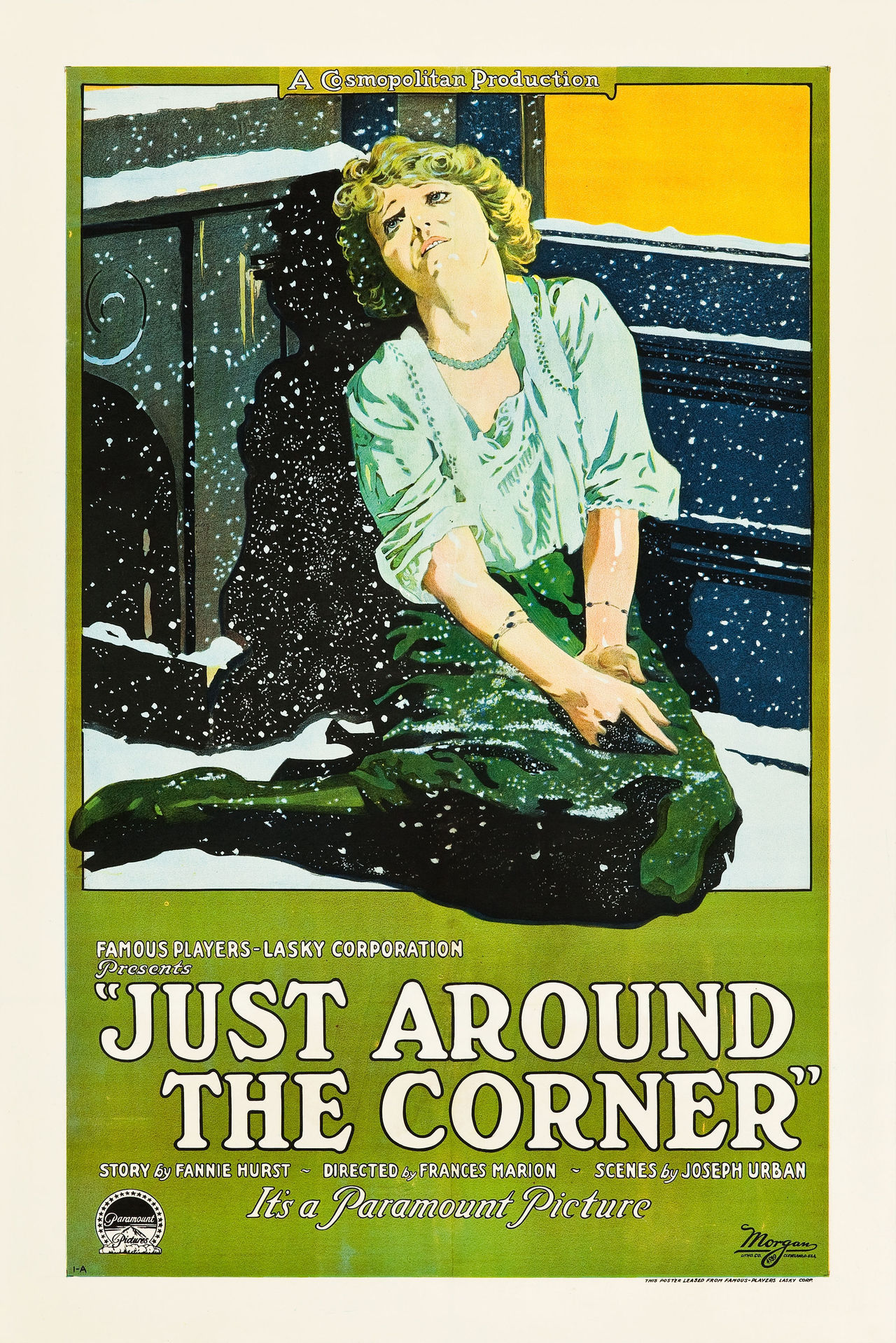
- Film poster
- Directed by: Frances Marion
- Written by: Frances Marion (scenario)
- Based on: short story "Superman" by Fannie Hurst
- Produced by: William Randolph Hearst (thru Cosmopolitan Productions)
- Starring: Margaret Seddon; Lewis Sargent; Sigrid Holmquist
- Cinematography: Henry Cronjager
- Distributed by: Paramount Pictures
- Release date: December 11, 1921
- Running time: 7 reels (6,173 feet)
- Country: United States
- Language: Silent (English intertitles)

Just Around the Corner is an extant 1921 American silent drama film produced by William Randolph Hearst's Cosmopolitan Productions and distributed through Paramount Pictures. The film is based on a short story, "Superman," by Fannie Hurst and was directed by Frances Marion, a prolific Hollywood scenarist.

Sigrid Holmquist came from Sweden. Fred Thomson had married Marion in 1919, and later became a cowboy star. Marion directed one other picture, Mary Pickford's The Love Light (1921).

== Plot ==
As described in a film magazine, ailing Ma Birdsong's well intentioned but misguided daughter Essie is wooed by a worthless young man, Joe Ullman, who will not visit the home in the ghetto to visit either her mother or brother Jimmie, who works to support and protect the family. Essie definitely dismisses him on a night when, unbeknownst to her, her mother is dying, but when she finds out she attempts to recall him so that her mother can believe that she will be well cared for. A passing stranger sympathy is aroused and he agrees to substitute for the trifling Joe. The mother dies peacefully after seeing him, and he eventually comes to love and marry Essie.

== Cast ==
- Margaret Seddon as Ma Birdsong
- Lewis Sargent as Jimmie Birdsong
- Sigrid Holmquist as Essie Birdsong
- Eddie Phillips as Joe Ullman (credited as Edward Phillips)
- Fred Thomson as The Real Man
- Peggy Parr as Lulu Pope
- Rosa Rosanova as Mrs. Finshreiber
- William Nally as Mr. Blatsky

== Preservation status ==
A copy of Just Around the Corner is in the collection of the Library of Congress.
