= My Old Kentucky Home (1922 film) =

1922 film by Ray C. Smallwood

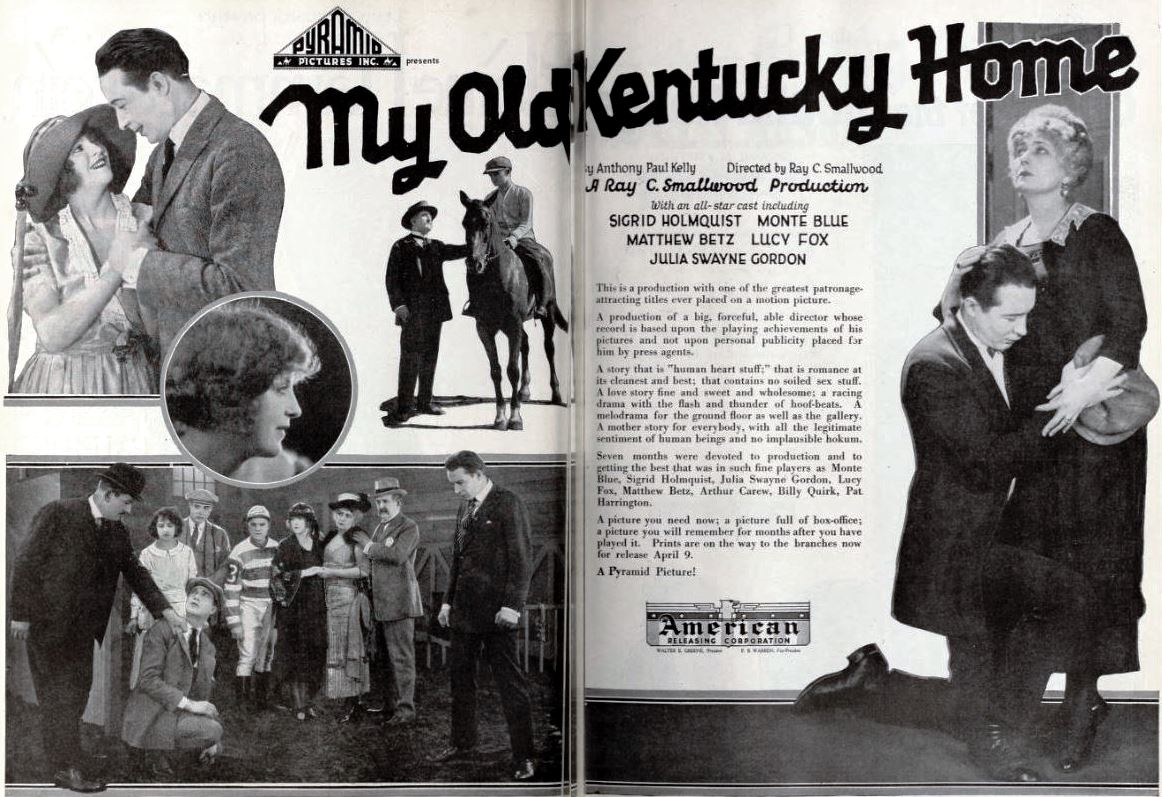
- Trade advertisement
- Directed by: Ray C. Smallwood
- Story by: Anthony Paul Kelly
- Starring: Monte Blue; Julia Swayne Gordon; Frank Currier
- Cinematography: Mike Joyce; Ollie Leach
- Production company: Pyramid Pictures
- Distributed by: American Releasing Corporation
- Release date: April 22, 1922
- Running time: 7 reels
- Country: United States
- Language: Silent (English intertitles)

My Old Kentucky Home is a lost 1922 American silent drama film directed by Ray C. Smallwood and starring Monte Blue, Julia Swayne Gordon, and Frank Currier.

== Plot ==
As described in a film magazine, Richard Goodloe, son of a proud Southern widow, has been released from prison where he served two years after being railroaded by another crook, and returns to his home in Kentucky. En route he meets his former sweetheart Virginia Sanders. His mother has entered their horse Dixie in the derby and the family fortune is at stake. In one of the fastest races ever run, Dixie wins. Mrs. Goodloe accepts the hand of Colonel Sanders, and after "Con" Arnold is exposed as a criminal, Virginia declares her love for Richard.

== Cast ==
- Monte Blue as Richard Goodloe
- Julia Swayne Gordon as Mrs. Goodloe
- Frank Currier as Colonel Sanders
- Sigrid Holmquist as Virginia Sanders
- Arthur Edmund Carewe as "Con" Arnold (credited as Arthur Carewe)
- Lucy Fox as Calamity Jane
- Matthew Betz as Steven McKenna
- Billy Quirk as Loney Smith
- Pat Hartigan as Detective Monahan
- Tom Blake as Nitro Jim
