= School for Wives (film) =

1925 film

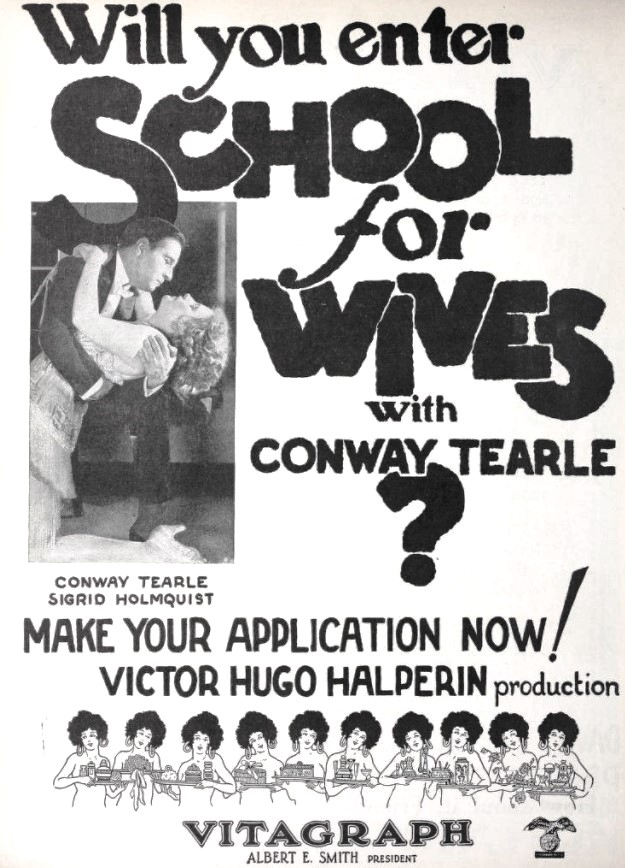
- Advertisement
- Directed by: Victor Halperin
- Written by: Victor Halperin
- Based on: The House of Lynch by Leonard Merrick
- Produced by: Victor Halperin
- Starring: Conway Tearle; Sigrid Holmquist; Peggy Kelly
- Cinematography: Joseph Ruttenberg; Jack Zanderbrock
- Production company: Victory Pictures
- Distributed by: Vitagraph Company of America
- Release date: April 5, 1925
- Running time: 70 minutes
- Country: United States
- Language: Silent (English intertitles)

School for Wives is a 1925 American silent drama film directed by Victor Halperin and starring Conway Tearle, Sigrid Holmquist, and Peggy Kelly. It provided an early role for the future star Brian Donlevy. Based on Leonard Merrick's 1907 melodramatic novel The House of Lynch, it was not well-received by critics.

== Plot ==
As described in a film magazine review, a rich young woman marries a poor English artist who refuses to accept her father's tainted money. The artist lives up to his ideals, which precipitates a conflict. He is forced to accept a sum which permits their son to have an operation. After the wife gives up on her father's money through learning that it has no place in the scheme of happiness, she is reconciled to her husband. They live happily.

== Cast ==
- Conway Tearle as Richard Keith
- Sigrid Holmquist as Betty Lynch
- Peggy Kelly as Lady Atherton
- Arthur Donaldson as Jordan B. Lynch
- Allan Simpson as Howard Lynch
- Brian Donlevy as Ralph
- Dick Lee as Tomlinson
- Dorothy Allen as Muggins
- Gerald Oliver Smith as Ronald Van Stuyvesant
- Emily Chichester as Kitty Dawson
- Alyce Mills as Mary Wilson
- Orlando Daly as Harold Waldehast
- Jill Lynn as Dardy Waldehast
- Mary Carr
- Tyrone Power Sr.

== Preservation ==
With no prints of School for Wives located in any film archives, it is a lost film.

== Bibliography ==
- Goble, Alan. The Complete Index to Literary Sources in Film. Walter de Gruyter, 1999.
- Sculthorpe, Derek. Brian Donlevy, the Good Bad Guy: A Bio-Filmography. McFarland, 2017.
