= Youth for Sale =

1924 film directed by Christy Cabanne

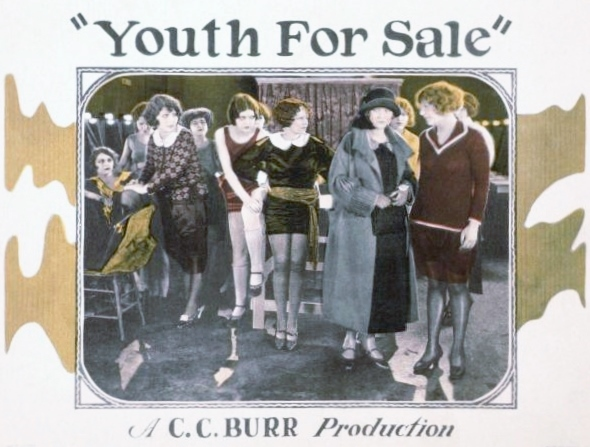
- Directed by: Christy Cabanne
- Written by: Gerald C. Duffy (as Gerald Duffy; Raymond S. Harris
- Based on: the short story, "The Gray Path" by Izola Forrester
- Produced by: C.C. Burr
- Starring: May Allison; Sigrid Holmquist; Richard Bennett
- Cinematography: Jack Brown
- Production company: C.C. Burr Pictures
- Release date: August 1, 1924 (US)
- Running time: 6 reels
- Country: United States
- Language: English

Youth for Sale is a 1924 silent American drama film directed by Christy Cabanne and starring May Allison, Sigrid Holmquist, and Richard Bennett. It was released on August 1, 1924.

== Cast ==
- May Allison as Molly Malloy
- Sigrid Holmquist as Connie Sutton
- Richard Bennett as Montgomery Breck
- Charles Emmett Mack as Tom Powers
- Alice Chapin as Mrs. Malloy
- Tom Blake as Bill Brophy
- Dorothy Allen as Pansy Mears
- Charles Byer as George Archibald
- Harold Foshay as Edward Higgins
