= Arnold Lucy =

British actor (1865–1945)

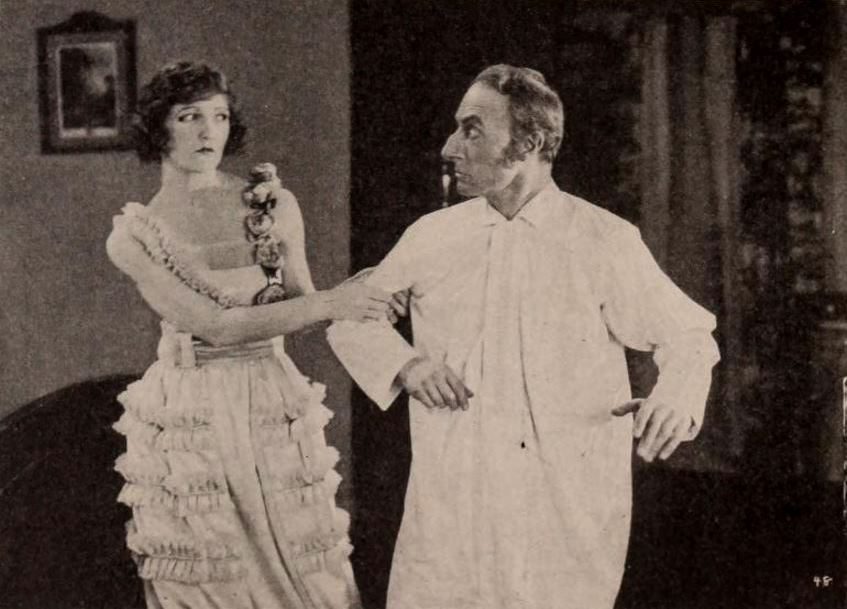
- With Constance Talmadge in The Love Expert (1920)
- Born: Walter George Campbell; 8 August 1865; Tottenham, Middlesex, England
- Died: 15 December 1945 (aged 80); Los Angeles, California, U.S.
- Occupation: Actor
- Years active: 1912–1937

Arnold Lucy (born Walter George Campbell, 8 August 1865 – 15 December 1945) was a British theatre and film actor, best known as Professor Kantorek in All Quiet on the Western Front (1930).

== Life and career ==
Born in Tottenham on 8 August 1865,, Lucy was the youngest of the six sons of architect and surveyor Donald Campbell and his wife Lucy Elizabeth (née Speak) of Church Lane, Hornfield Lodge, Tottenham. His parents got married in 1853. Their youngest child and only daughter, Rose Lucy, was born in 1871. Arnold Lucy started his acting career in the late 19th century at the theatre.

Lucy worked for an accounting firm in London for five years before going to Australia in 1887. There he gained recognition for reciting prose monologues and humorous and dramatic poetry. He returned to England and studied under Hermann Vezin. He went on to recite at a number of venues thereafter. In 1895 he began acting as an understudy in The Passport at Terry's Theatre.

He said that he performed on the London West End stage over 1,200 times before making his film debut in the silent film The Devil's Toy (1916).

Lucy played in over 40 British and American movies between 1916 and 1938, mostly in small roles. He often portrayed authoritarian and dignified roles, most notable as Professor Kantorek, the nationalistic school teacher in All Quiet on the Western Front, who persuades his students to go into a horrible and deadly war. Beside his film career, he also performed in 15 plays on Broadway between 1912 and 1927. Lucy died on December 15, 1945, in Los Angeles, California, aged 80.

== Filmography ==
| Year | Title | Role | Notes |
|---|---|---|---|
| 1916 | The Devil's Toy | Simon Cunningale | Lost film |
| 1917 | In Again, Out Again | Amos Jennings | |
| 1918 | A Nymph of the Foothills | Old Man | Lost film |
| 1920 | In Search of a Sinner | Henry | Lost film |
| 1920 | The Cost | Minor Role | Uncredited |
| 1920 | The Love Expert | Mr. Hardcastle | |
| 1920 | Good References | The Bishop | |
| 1921 | You Find It Everywhere | Charles Simpson | Lost film |
| 1921 | School Days | The Valet | Incomplete film |
| 1922 | Fair Lady | Uncle Bernie Drew | Lost film |
| 1923 | Modern Marriage | Elihu Simpson | |
| 1929 | The Ghost Talks | Julius Bowser | Lost film |
| 1929 | The One Woman Idea | Ali | |
| 1929 | Masquerade | Bannerman | |
| 1930 | City Girl | Cafe Patron | Uncredited |
| 1930 | All Quiet on the Western Front | Professor Kantorek | |
| 1930 | Manslaughter | Piers | |
| 1930 | Scotland Yard | Mc Killop | Uncredited |
| 1930 | The Princess and the Plumber | | |
| 1931 | Unfaithful | Bishop | |
| 1931 | Young Sinners | Butler | |
| 1931 | Merely Mary Ann | Vicar Smedge | |
| 1931 | Five Star Final | Dr. Bevins | Uncredited |
| 1931 | Dr. Jekyll and Mr. Hyde | Utterson | Uncredited |
| 1932 | Lady with a Past | Butler | Uncredited |
| 1932 | Alias the Doctor | The Deacon | Uncredited |
| 1932 | Skyscraper Souls | Banker | Uncredited |
| 1932 | Guilty as Hell | Dr. Sully | |
| 1932 | Sherlock Holmes | Chaplain | Uncredited |
| 1932 | The Match King | Board of Directors Spokesman | Uncredited |
| 1933 | Loyalties | Googie | |
| 1933 | The Wandering Jew | Andrea Michelotti | |
| 1934 | The Rise of Catherine the Great | Minor Role | Uncredited |
| 1934 | Rolling in Money | | |
| 1934 | The Luck of a Sailor | | |
| 1934 | The Man Who Knew Too Much | Minor Role | Uncredited |
| 1935 | Midshipman Easy | | |
| 1935 | The Morals of Marcus | | |
| 1936 | Laburnum Grove | | |
| 1936 | Spy of Napoleon | Minor Role | Uncredited |
| 1937 | Victoria the Great | | |
| 1937 | Member of the Jury | Uncle | (final film role) |
