= Two Shall Be Born =

1924 film

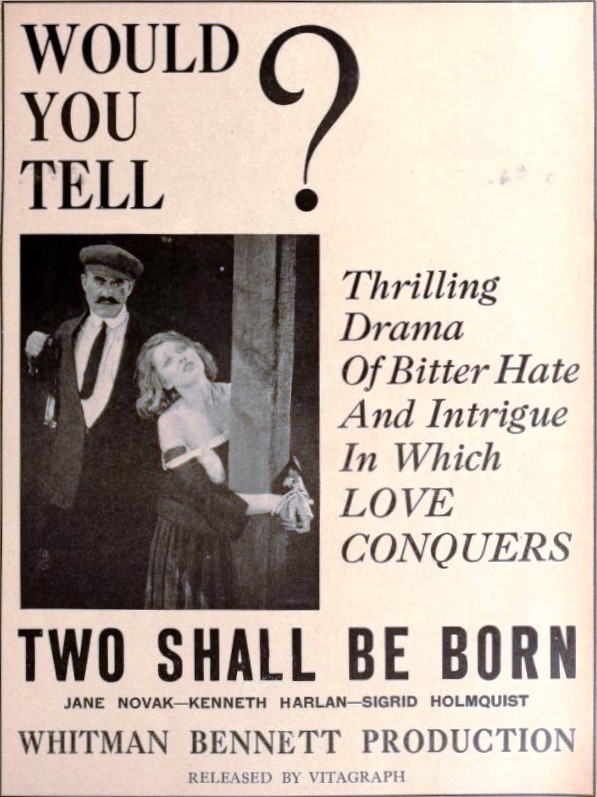
- Advertisement
- Directed by: Whitman Bennett
- Story by: Marie Conway Oemler
- Starring: Jane Novak; Kenneth Harlan; Sigrid Holmquist
- Cinematography: Edward Paul
- Production company: Twin Pictures
- Distributed by: Vitagraph Company of America
- Release date: December 7, 1924
- Running time: 60 minutes
- Country: United States
- Language: Silent (English intertitles)

Two Shall Be Born is a 1924 American silent drama film directed by Whitman Bennett and starring Jane Novak, Kenneth Harlan, and Sigrid Holmquist. It was written by Marie Conway Oemler who was inspired by the short story "Two Shall Be Born" by Susan Marr Spalding.

== Synopsis ==
A Polish countess on a mission to promote world peace, arrives in New York where she receives assistance from a traffic policeman who helps her thwart attempts to foil her mission.

== Cast ==
- Jane Novak as Countess Mayra Zuleska
- Kenneth Harlan as Brian Kelly
- Sigrid Holmquist as Janet Van Wyck
- Frank Sheridan as Dominick Kelly
- Herman Lieb as Baron von Rittenheim
- Fuller Mellish as Count Florian
- Joseph Burke as Wenceslaus
- Blanche Craig as Aunt Honora Kelly
- Joseffa De Bok as Franciska
- Catharine Evans as Widow Callaghan
- Walter James as Hund

== Preservation ==
With no prints of Two Shall Be Born located in any film archives, it is a lost film.

== Bibliography ==
- Kris Van Heuckelom. Polish Migrants in European Film 1918–2017. Springer, 2019.
