= The Love Expert =

1920 film directed by David Kirkland

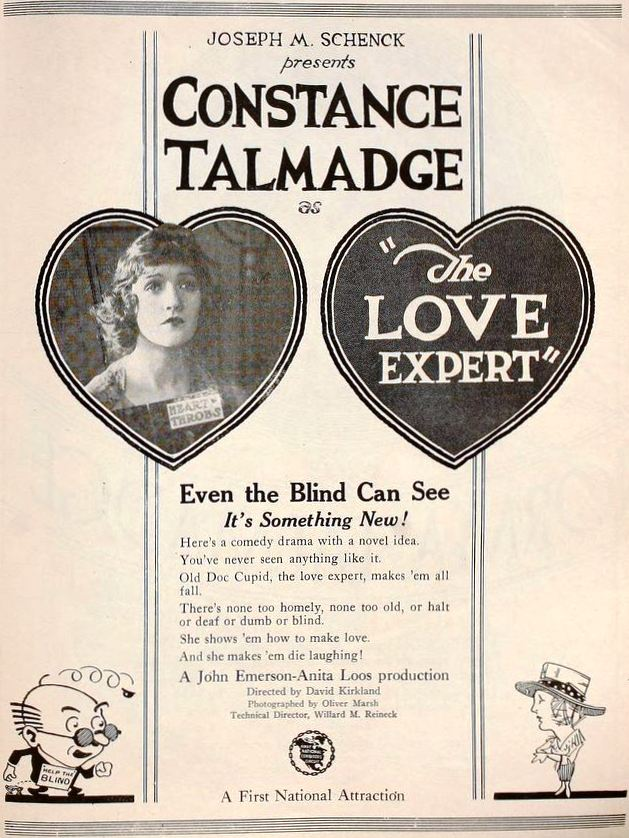
- Advertisement
- Directed by: David Kirkland
- Written by: John Emerson; Anita Loos
- Produced by: Constance Talmadge
- Starring: Constance Talmadge
- Cinematography: Oliver Marsh
- Production company: Constance Talmadge Film Company
- Distributed by: First National Pictures
- Release date: April 18, 1920
- Running time: 6 reels
- Country: United States
- Language: Silent (English intertitles)

The Love Expert is a surviving 1920 American silent romantic comedy film directed by David Kirkland and produced by and starring Constance Talmadge. It was an early distribution release by the First National Exhibitor's Company.

== Plot ==
As described in a film magazine, Babs is sent home from boarding school because she persists in carrying out her fanciful love researches instead of studying her lessons. Continuing these experiments at home, her father, the influential and stern John Hardcastle, punishes her by sending Babs to stay with Aunt Emily in Boston instead of taking her to Palm Beach. However, in Boston Babs finds fertile ground for her experiments. Aunt Emily has been for six years engaged to Jim Winthrop, but a wedding seems remote as Jim has two unmarried sisters and an elderly aunt to look after. Something has to be done, so Babs sends a fake telegram which results in her going to Palm Beach accompanied by her troupe of Bostonians, much to the amazement of her father. Romance after romance follows in the wake of her experiments. Then comes the news that Aunt Emily, who was left behind in Boston, has married a college professor. That news does not break Jim's heart, for the "love expert" uses one of her unfailing remedies.

== Cast ==
- Constance Talmadge as Babs
- John Halliday as Jim Winthrop
- Arnold Lucy as Mr. Hardcastle
- Natalie Talmadge as Dorcas Winthrop
- Fannie Bourke as Matilda Winthrop
- Nellie P. Spaulding as Aunt Cornelia
- Marion Sitgreave as Aunt Emily
- James Spottswood as Mr. Thompson
- David Kirkland as Mr. Smithers
- Edward Kepler as Professor Blecker

The film

== Preservation ==
A print of The Love Expert is preserved in the Library of Congress collection and the British Film Institute National Film and Television Archive.
