= Dorothy Allen =

American actress

- Born: October 23, 1896; Houston, Texas, U.S.
- Died: September 30, 1970 (aged 73); New York City, U.S.

Dorothy Allen (October 23, 1896 – September 30, 1970) was an American actress principally active in the 1920s.

Born in Houston, Texas, Allen landed her first roles in 1918 and acted in several Poverty Row films through 1925. Among her biggest roles were in the 1920 film Over the Hill to the Poorhouse and as Miranda Means in 1924's The Hoosier Schoolmaster.

Allen died in New York City.

== Filmography ==
- Three Green Eyes (1919)
- Over the Hill to the Poorhouse (1920)
- Beyond Price (1921)
- Dynamite Allen (1921)
- The Power Within (1921)
- The Broken Silence (1922)
- Free Air (1922)
- If Winter Comes (1923)
- The Hoosier Schoolmaster (1924)
- Second Youth (1924)
- Youth for Sale (1924)
- School for Wives (1925)
