= Too Many Crooks (1927 film) =

1927 film

- Lobby card
- Directed by: Fred C. Newmeyer
- Screenplay by: E.J. Rath; Rex Taylor
- Produced by: Jesse L. Lasky; Adolph Zukor
- Starring: Mildred Davis; Lloyd Hughes; George Bancroft; El Brendel; William V. Mong; John St. Polis; Otto Matieson
- Cinematography: Harry Jackson
- Production company: Famous Players–Lasky Corporation
- Distributed by: Paramount Pictures
- Release date: April 2, 1927
- Running time: 60 minutes; 5,399 feet (1,646 m)
- Country: United States
- Language: Silent (English intertitles)

Too Many Crooks is a lost 1927 American silent comedy film directed by Fred C. Newmeyer, written by E.J. Rath and Rex Taylor, and starring Mildred Davis, Lloyd Hughes, George Bancroft, El Brendel, William V. Mong, John St. Polis and Otto Matieson. It was released on April 2, 1927, by Paramount Pictures.

== Cast ==
- Mildred Davis as Ceia Mason
- Lloyd Hughes as John Barton
- George Bancroft as Bert the Boxman
- El Brendel as Botts
- William V. Mong as Coxey, the Con-man
- John St. Polis as Erastus Mason
- Otto Matieson as Fast Hands Foster
- Betty Francisco as Frisco Flora
- Gayne Whitman as Marshall Stone
- Tom Ricketts as Butler
- Cleve Moore as Freddie Smythe
- Ruth Cherrington as Mrs. Smythe
- Pat Hartigan as 'Big Dan' Boyd
