= Time, the Comedian =

1925 film

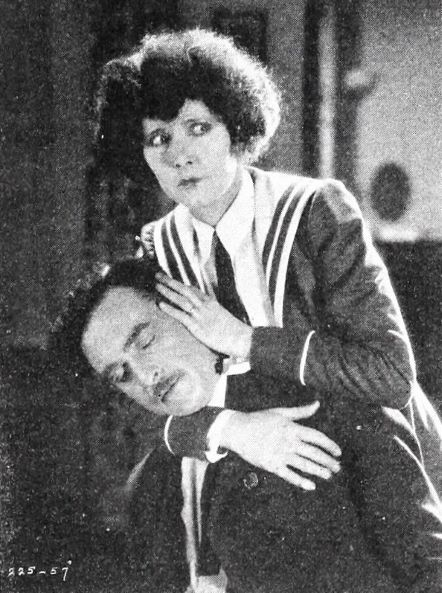
- Still with Busch and Cody
- Directed by: Robert Z. Leonard
- Written by: Fanny Hatton; Frederic Hatton
- Based on: Time, the Comedian by Kate Jordan
- Starring: Mae Busch; Lew Cody
- Cinematography: Oliver T. Marsh
- Distributed by: Metro-Goldwyn-Mayer
- Release date: November 8, 1925
- Running time: 50 minutes
- Country: United States
- Language: Silent (English intertitles)

Time, the Comedian is a 1925 American silent drama film directed by Robert Z. Leonard that stars Mae Busch and Lew Cody. The film was a hit.

== Plot ==
As described in a review in a film magazine, Nora is a discontented mother leaves her husband and baby to go with Larry, a wealthy idler. The husband commits suicide and the idler leaves her. Later we find the woman a successful opera singer. Larry again appears and falls in love with the daughter Ruth, now grown. To save her when she refuses to listen to her advice, the mother goes to this man and feigns love. The daughter finds her and guesses the truth, and finally finds happiness with a faithful suitor.

== Cast ==
- Mae Busch as Nora Dakon
- Lew Cody as Larry Brundage
- Gertrude Olmstead as Ruth Dakon
- Rae Ethelyn as Ruth Dakon, as a child
- Roy Stewart as Michael Lawler
- Paulette Duval as Mrs. St. Germaine
- Creighton Hale as Tom Cautley
- Nellie Parker Spaulding as Aunt Abbey
- Robert Ober as Anthony Dakon
- David Mir as Count de Brissac
- Templar Saxe as Prince Strotoff
- Mildred Vincent as Swedish Maid

== Preservation ==
A 35 mm copy of Time, the Comedian is held by George Eastman Museum.
