= Up in Arms =

1944 film directed by Elliott Nugent

- 1944 US theatrical poster
- Directed by: Elliott Nugent
- Screenplay by: Don Hartman; Allen Boretz; Robert Pirosh
- Produced by: Samuel Goldwyn
- Starring: Danny Kaye; Dinah Shore
- Cinematography: Ray Rennahan
- Edited by: Daniel Mandell; James Newcom; John F. Link Sr. (uncredited)
- Music by: Max Steiner
- Production company: Samuel Goldwyn Productions
- Distributed by: RKO Radio Pictures
- Release date: February 17, 1944 (U.S.)
- Running time: 106 mins.
- Country: United States
- Language: English
- Box office: $4,715,000 (worldwide rentals)

Up in Arms is a 1944 musical film directed by Elliott Nugent and starring Danny Kaye and Dinah Shore. It was nominated for two Academy Awards in 1945.

== Plot ==
Danny Weems works as an elevator operator in a New York Medical building, so he can be close to doctors and nurses and get free advice on his supposed illnesses. The doctors know him well and consider him a hypochondriac. So, when he is drafted into the US Army for war service, he is devastated. His best friend Joe gets himself also drafted so he can keep an eye on Danny.

Danny is in love with nurse Mary Morgan, but she is really in love with Joe, and Joe's girl Virginia is secretly in love with Danny. The boys get through basic training, and as they embark by ship to the South Pacific, they discover that Mary and Virginia have also enlisted as army nurses. As officers, though, they cannot fraternize with the boys.

Danny contrives to smuggle Mary on board, and during the voyage, he tries to keep her hidden, but the truth eventually comes out and Danny is hauled before Colonel Ashley – who has him sent to the brig.

When the troops are landed on a Pacific island, Danny is again imprisoned, but is "rescued" by a Japanese patrol. They try to interrogate him, but Danny manages to bamboozle them and eventually impersonates the commander. He gives orders that the soldiers surrender to the Americans – and they obey orders to the letter, and Danny is a hero.

== Cast ==
- Danny Kaye as Danny Weems
- Dinah Shore as Nurse Lt. Virginia Merrill
- Dana Andrews as Joe Nelson
- Constance Dowling as Nurse Lt. Mary Morgan
- Louis Calhern as Col. Phil Ashley
- George Mathews (actor) as Blackie
- Benny Baker as Butterball
- Margaret Dumont as Mrs. Willoughby

== Production notes ==
- Production dates: late June–late September 1943
- The working title of this film was With Flying Colors.
- All of the actresses who played nurses in Up in Arms are listed collectively onscreen as "The Goldwyn Girls."
- Danny Kaye's character was based on the character "The Nervous Wreck" from the play of the same name by Owen Davis, which opened in New York in 1923. The play, which bears little resemblance to the film, was in turn based on the 1921 magazine serial The Wreck by Edith J. Rath and Sam H. Harris, which was published as a novel called The Nervous Wreck in 1923. In 1928, Florenz Ziegfeld staged a musical version of Davis' play called Whoopee! starring Eddie Cantor (film version, 1930).
- Up in Arms marked the motion picture feature debut of Broadway star Danny Kaye (1911–1987), and opened to uniformly rave reviews. The popular star, who began on Broadway in 1939, had already turned down a contract with Metro-Goldwyn-Mayer when he was cast in Up in Arms. After this film, Kaye became an international success and he went on to do four more pictures in succession with Sam Goldwyn before moving on to Warner Bros., 20th Century Fox and Paramount Pictures.
- Harold Arlen & Ted Koehler contributed 3 songs to the film; "All Out For Freedom", "Now I Know" & "Tess's Torch Song".

Elliott Nugent called it "a funny script and a pleasure to introduce that admirable New York entertainer, Danny Kaye, to the mysteries of the film medium."

== Reception ==
At the 17th Academy Awards on March 15, 1945, Up in Arms was nominated in the Music (Scoring of a Musical Picture) and Music (Song-"Now I Know") categories. The film earned theatrical rentals of $3,015,000 in the United States and Canada and $1,700,000 overseas for a worldwide total of $4,715,000.
