= Nellie Parker Spaulding =

American actress

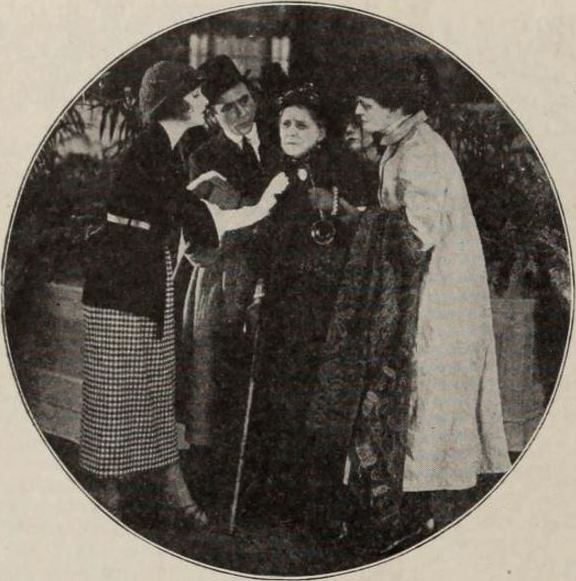
- Spaulding (second from right) in The Love Expert (1920)
- Born: August 4, 1870; Machias, Maine
- Died: June 18, 1945 (aged 74); Glendale, California
- Occupation: Actress

Nellie Parker Spaulding (August 4, 1870 – June 18, 1945) was an American silent film actress who appeared in at least 37 films between 1915 and 1925.

== Early life and career ==
Parker was born in Machias, Maine and educated at the Emerson College of Expression in Boston. Her early career was in stage productions included The Country Boy, The Dawn of a To-morrow, and The Governor's Lady. She also worked with Union Opera Company.

Parker's first film role came when she was 45 years old, in The Flying Twins (1915), playing the role of 'Aunt Sally'. Between 1915 and 1917 she would appear in 14 different Thanhouser Studio films. Originally billed as 'Eleanor Spaulding', she was using the more informal 'Nellie' by 1918. She most often played mothers, aunts, or older women, such as "Mrs. Peniston" in the first filmed version of Edith Wharton's The House of Mirth (1918). Spaulding worked for various production companies, but her last role was in MGM Picture's Time the Comedian in 1925.

== Death ==
Spaulding died at age 74 in Glendale, California on June 18, 1945.

== Selected filmography ==
- Reputation (1917)
- Love Watches (1918)
- The House of Mirth (1918)
- Good References (1920)
- Dynamite Allen (1921)
- The Power Within (1921)
- East Lynne (1921)
- School Days (1921)
- The Inner Man (1922)
- Twenty-One (1923)
- The Truth About Wives (1923)
- One Million in Jewels (1923)
- Time, the Comedian (1925)
