= The Prophet's Paradise (film) =

1922 film

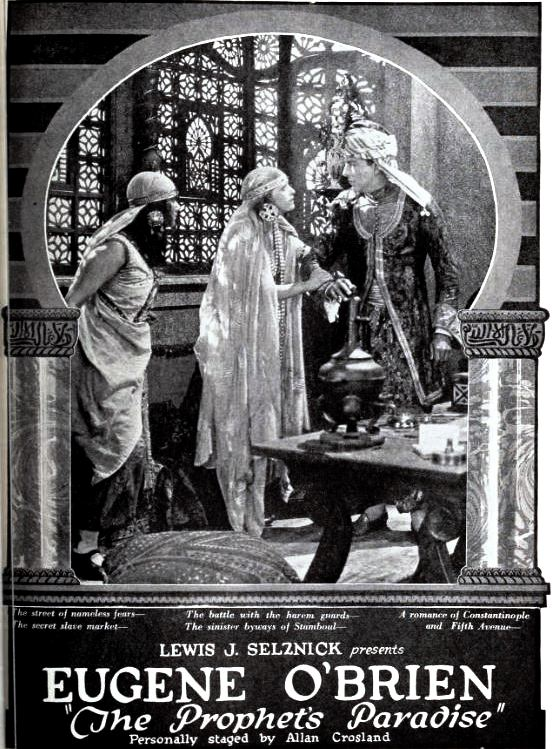
- Directed by: Alan Crosland
- Written by: Lewis Allen Browne; C.S. Montayne
- Produced by: Lewis J. Selznick
- Starring: Eugene O'Brien; Sigrid Holmquist; Arthur Housman
- Cinematography: Jules Cronjager
- Production company: Selznick Pictures
- Distributed by: Select Pictures
- Release date: February 28, 1922
- Running time: 50 minutes
- Country: United States
- Language: Silent (English intertitles)

The Prophet's Paradise is a lost 1922 American silent drama film directed by Alan Crosland and starring Eugene O'Brien, Sigrid Holmquist, and Arthur Housman.

== Plot ==
A young American in Istanbul meets the daughter of an archaeologist examining Byzantium ruins, and rescues her from a gang of slavers who have kidnapped her.

== Cast ==
- Eugene O'Brien as Howard Anderson
- Sigrid Holmquist as Mary Talbot
- Bigelow Cooper as Hassard
- Arthur Housman as Kadir
- Nora Booth as Nelda
- Joseph Burke as John Talbot
- Jack Hopkins as Krand

== Bibliography ==
- Monaco, James. The Encyclopedia of Film. Perigee Books, 1991.
