= Good References =

1920 film by Roy William Neill

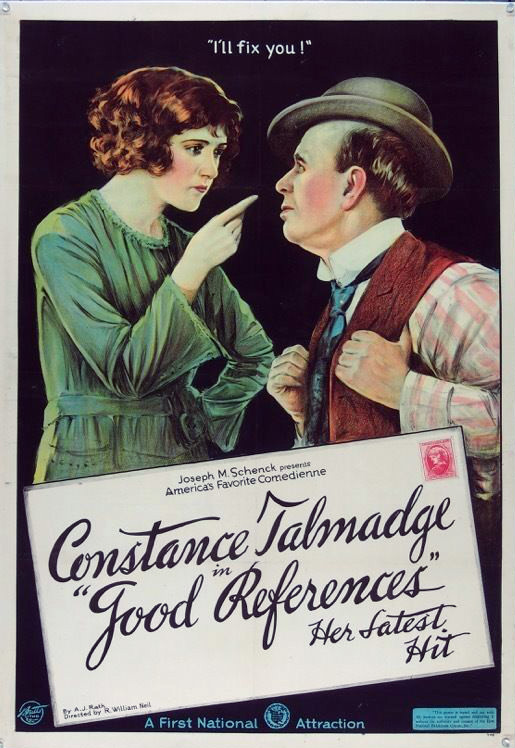
- Theatrical poster
- Directed by: Roy William Neill
- Written by: Dorothy Farnum (scenario); Burns Mantle (titles)
- Based on: Good References by E.J. Rath
- Starring: Constance Talmadge; Vincent Coleman; Ned Sparks; Nellie Parker Spaulding; Mona Lisa; Matthew Betz
- Cinematography: Oliver T. Marsh
- Production company: First National Exhibitors' Circuit
- Distributed by: First National Exhibitors' Circuit
- Release date: August 1920
- Running time: 5 reels
- Country: United States
- Language: Silent (English intertitles)

Good References is a 1920 American silent romantic comedy drama film directed by Roy William Neill and starring Constance Talmadge, Vincent Coleman, Ned Sparks, Nellie Parker Spaulding, Mona Lisa, and Matthew Betz. It is based on the novel of the same name by E.J. Rath. The film was released by First National Exhibitors' Circuit in August 1920.

== Plot ==
Mary Wayne is a resilient and attractive protagonist who faces the daunting predicament of being both jobless and penniless in a bustling metropolis. Commencing with her eviction from a boarding house due to breaching its regulations by cooking breakfast on a small chafing dish.

Mary serendipitously encounters Nell Norcross, a shrewd individual who has adeptly fabricated a set of character recommendations. Equipped with these falsified references, Mary secures the position of social secretary to the captivating young millionaire, William Marshall. To preserve her newfound role, Mary undertakes the arduous task of refining William's demeanor, transforming him from a rough-and-tumble individual into a polished gentleman capable of ascending the social hierarchy.

Amidst the unfolding narrative, a series of comedic circumstances ensue. Notably, Mary and her accomplice, an acquaintance posing as William's valet, find themselves deserted onshore in their bathing suits after an impromptu swim, while William inadvertently sets sail without them. The film follows their subsequent journey back home, clad in scant attire, and the ensuing confrontation with William's sporting comrades at his family estate.

As the story progresses, Mary learns valuable lessons about the futility of counterfeit "good references" in lieu of genuine qualifications. Her resilience and unwavering determination ultimately lead her to overcome her predicament and seize the Marshall fortune through a fortuitous union.

== Cast ==
- Constance Talmadge as Mary Wayne
- Vincent Coleman as William Marshall
- Ned Sparks as Peter Stearns
- Nellie Parker Spaulding as Caroline Marshall (credited as Nellie P. Spaulding)
- Mona Lisa as Nell Norcross (credited as Mona Liza)
- Matthew Betz as Kid Whaley (credited as Matthew L. Betts)
- Arnold Lucy as the bishop
- Dorothy Walters as the landlady
- George Fawcett as Major Colton

== Preservation ==
A copy of Good References survives at Národní Filmový Archiv in Prague.
