= The Light That Failed (1923 film) =

1923 film by George Melford

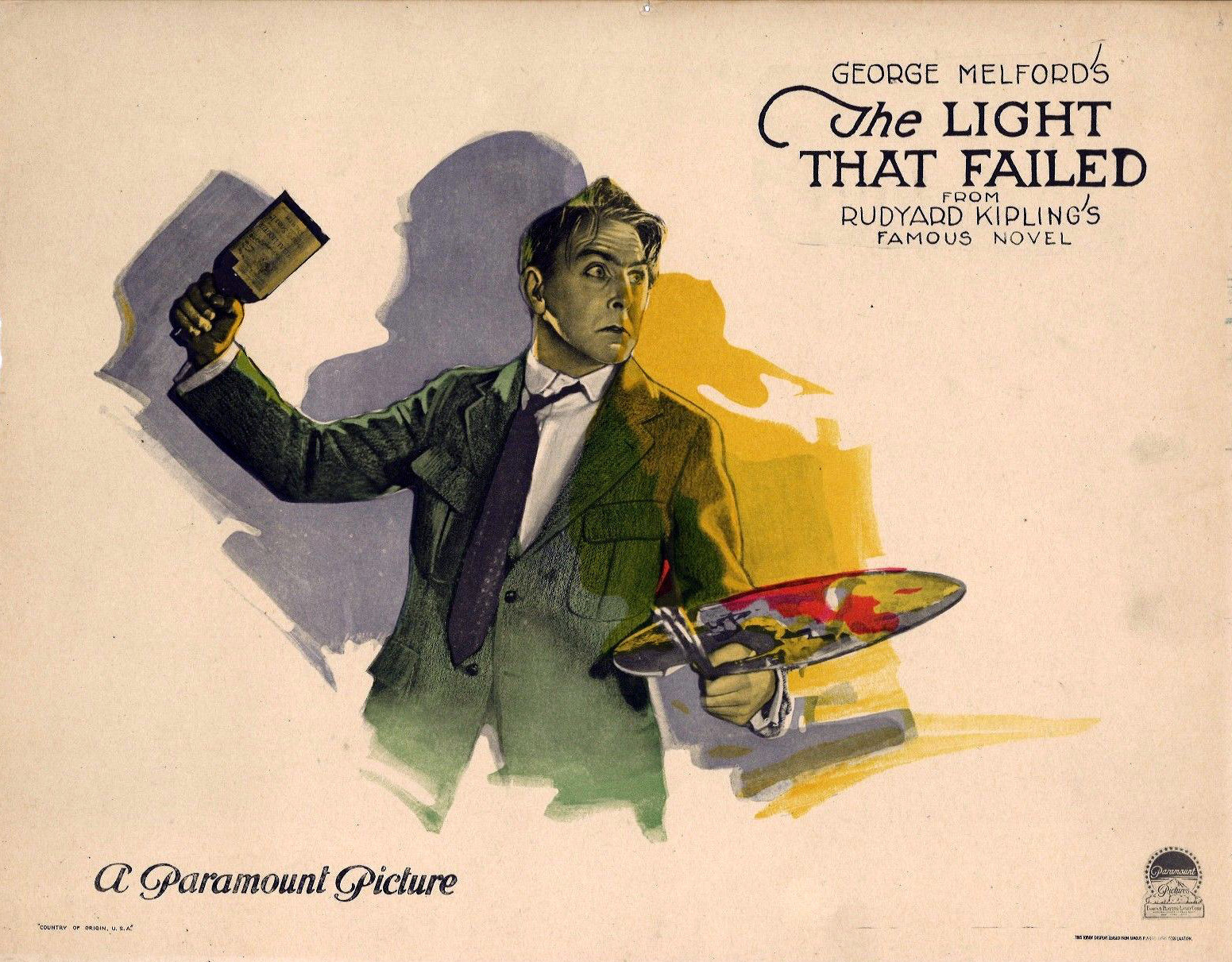
- Lobby card
- Directed by: George Melford
- Screenplay by: Jack Cunningham; F. McGrew Willis
- Based on: The Light That Failed by Rudyard Kipling
- Produced by: Jesse L. Lasky
- Starring: Jacqueline Logan; Percy Marmont; David Torrence; Sigrid Holmquist; Mabel Van Buren; Luke Cosgrave; Peggy Schaffer
- Cinematography: Charles G. Clarke
- Production company: Famous Players–Lasky Corporation
- Distributed by: Paramount Pictures
- Release date: October 25, 1923
- Running time: 70 minutes
- Country: United States
- Language: Silent (English intertitles)

The Light That Failed is a 1923 American silent drama film that was directed by George Melford and written by Jack Cunningham and F. McGrew Willis based on the 1891 novelette of the same name by Rudyard Kipling. The film stars Jacqueline Logan, Percy Marmont, David Torrence, Sigrid Holmquist, Mabel Van Buren, Luke Cosgrave, and Peggy Schaffer. The film was released on October 25, 1923, by Paramount Pictures.

It was remade in 1939 as a sound film starring Ronald Colman.

== Plot ==
As described in a film magazine review, artist Dick Heldar returns to London from the Sudan and wins fame through his war sketches. He meets his old sweetheart, Maisie Wells. Bessie Broke, the model for his masterpiece painting, causes a quarrel between the lovers. Dick goes blind and Bessie destroys the painting, which Dick had worked on during his last moments of sight. Later, Bessie relents and brings the two lovers back together again just as Dick's friend Topenhow leaves for the front during World War I.

== Cast ==
- Jacqueline Logan as Bessie Broke
- Percy Marmont as Dick Heldar
- David Torrence as Topenhow
- Sigrid Holmquist as Maisie Wells
- Mabel Van Buren as Madame Binat
- Luke Cosgrave as Binat
- Peggy Schaffer as Donna Lane
- Winston Miller as Young Dick
- Mary Jane Irving as Young Maisie

== Production ==
Exteriors for The Light That Failed were shot on location on Santa Catalina Island, and interiors were finished at Paramount studios.

== Preservation ==
With no prints of The Light That Failed located in any film archives, it is a lost film.
