= Marie Conway Oemler =

American author (1879-1932)

Marie Conway Oemler (May 29, 1879 – June 7, 1932) was an American author from Georgia. She wrote numerous books and was a contributor to publications including The Century Magazine, Harper's Bazaar, Women's Home Companion, and Ladies Home Journal. Her books Slippy McGee and A Woman Named Smith are part of the Library of Congress Collection and have been digitized. Three films have been adapted from her novels.

== Early life ==
Born Marie Conway in Savannah, Georgia on May 29, 1879, she was the daughter of Helena Browne Conway and Richard Hoban Conway. Her maternal grandmother was born in Tipperary, Ireland and taught her about Irish folklore and fairy tales throughout her childhood. Her paternal grandfather was an amateur naturalist. As a child, she lived with him in Florida, which is where she first met a Red Admiral, a butterfly that had an important role in her book The Purple Heights.

== Career ==
Oemler's first works were poetry and short stories, published in magazines from 1907 to 1917. Her first book, Slippy McGee, was published in 1917 and had slow sales at first. However, it had repeated printings and became Oemler's most popular novel. In 1919, Oemler's novel A Woman Named Smith was published. The book focused on a love story set in a haunted house in the South. Her next novel, The Purple Heights (1920), became a bestseller.

She wrote the 1927 novel The Holy Lover focusing on John Wesley, an 18th-century English religious leader. A historical novel, this work deviated from the popular fiction she created during most of her career, and stood alone as her most serious work. Most of her novels were written to appeal to wider audiences, using sensationalist adventure, romance, and suspense in her plots.

Her book Where the Young Child Was is a collection of Christmas themed stories.

== Personal life ==
She married John Norton Oemler in 1901 and had two children, a boy and a girl—Alan Norton Oemler and Elizabeth Heyward Oemler, respectively. She died from heart disease on June 7, 1932, in Charleston, South Carolina.

== Bibliography ==
=== Short stories ===
- The Spirit of the House (1915)
- Where the Young Child Was (1916)

=== Novels ===
- Slippy McGee: The Butterfly Man (1917)
- A Woman Named Smith (1919)
- The Purple Heights (1920)
- Where the Young Child Was and Other Christmas Stories (1921)
- Two Shall Be Born (1922)
- His Wife-in-Law (1925)
- The Holy Lover (1927)
- The Little Brown House (1927)
- The Laughing Prodigal (1928)
- Sheaves (1928)
- Johnny Reb (1929) New York & London, Century Co. (Grosset & Dunlap)
- Flower of Thorn (1931)

== Media adaptations ==
Oemler's work has been adapted into films, including Slippy McGee (1923), Two Shall Be Born (1924), and Slippy McGee (1948).

In Slippy McGee (1948), Norman S. Hall and Jerry Gruskin's screenplay was based on Oemler's novel.
