= A Gentleman of Leisure (1915 film) =

1915 film by George Melford

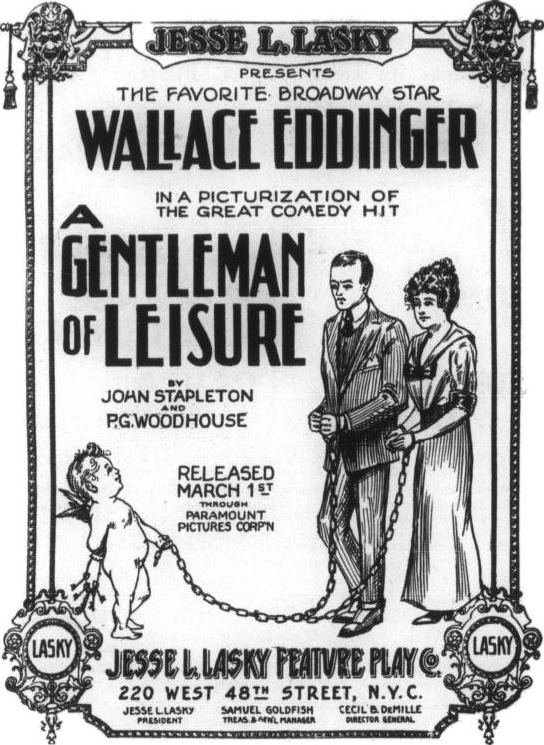
- Advertisement from Variety, February 27, 1915
- Directed by: George Melford
- Based on: A Gentleman of Leisure by P. G. Wodehouse and John Stapleton
- Produced by: Jesse Lasky
- Starring: Wallace Eddinger
- Cinematography: Walter Stradling
- Distributed by: Paramount Pictures
- Release date: March 1, 1915
- Running time: 5 reels
- Country: United States
- Language: Silent (English intertitles)

A Gentleman of Leisure is a surviving 1915 American silent comedy film produced by Jesse Lasky and distributed by Paramount Pictures. It stars stage veteran Wallace Eddinger. The film is based on the 1910 novel A Gentleman of Leisure by P. G. Wodehouse and 1911 Broadway play adapted by Wodehouse and John Stapleton. Douglas Fairbanks was a cast member in the play several years before beginning a film career. This film survives in the Library of Congress.

== Plot ==
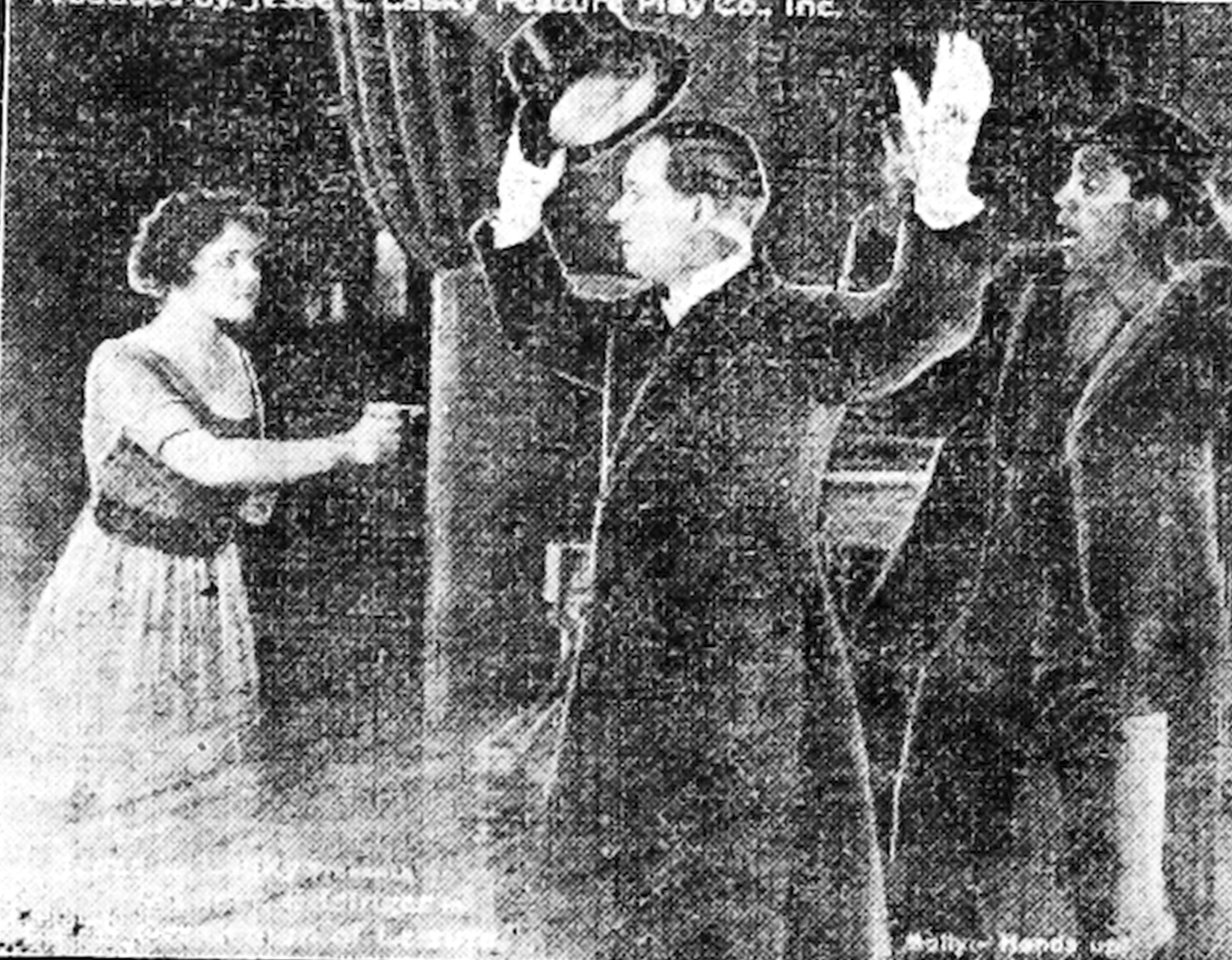

Robert Edgar Willoughby Pitt embarks on a steamship leaving London for New York. However, First Class is full and Robert is forced to travel with the emigrants on the lower deck, from where, by regulation, he cannot access the upper one. The beautiful Molly Creedon is traveling in First Class and Robert, in order to woo the girl, encounters many difficulties precisely because of the restrictions with which he has to comply.

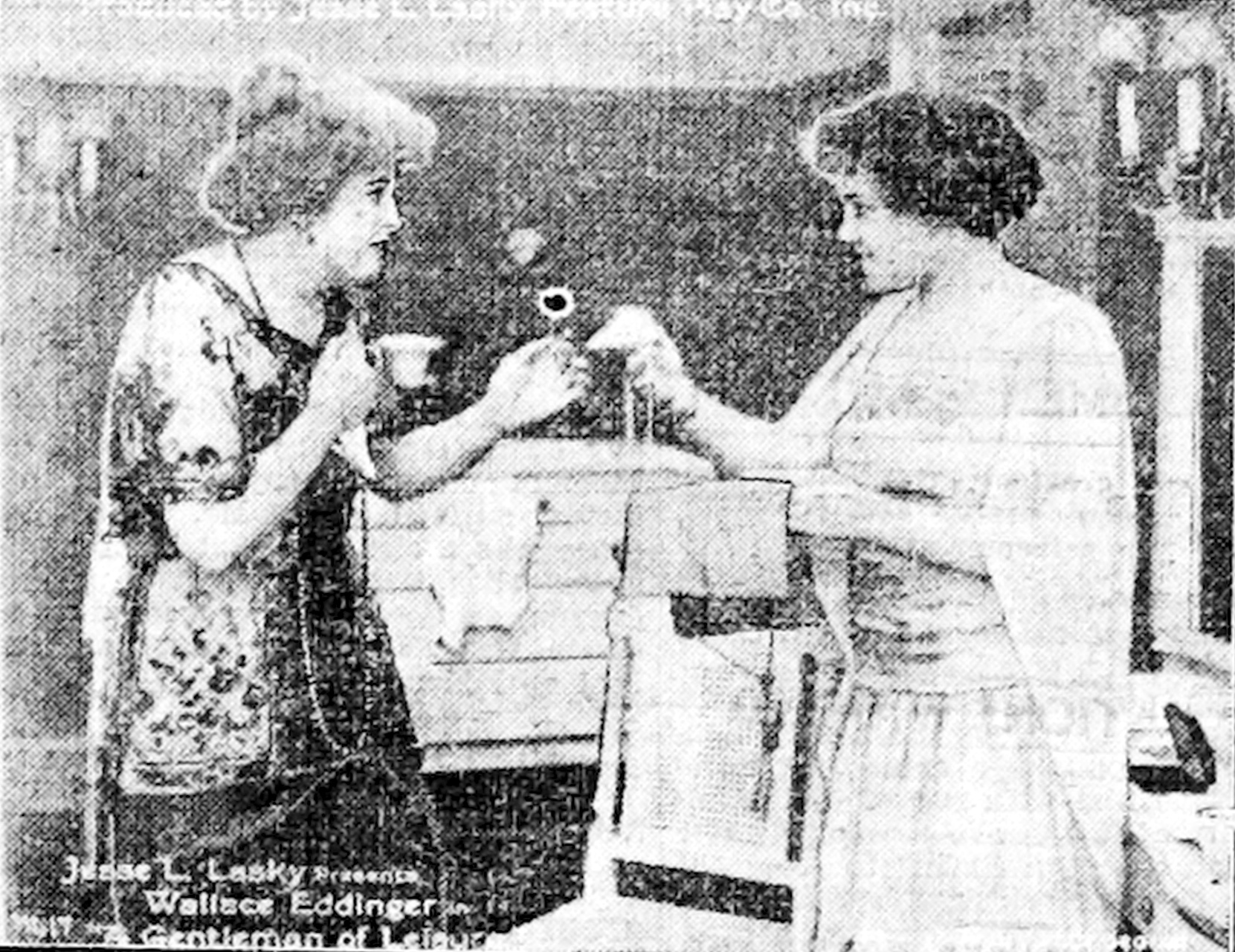

Arriving in New York, Robert heads to his exclusive club, where he bets that he could rob a house and avoid being arrested. Later, when Spike Mullins tries to rob him, Robert prevents him, but offers to team up on the caper. Spike suggests robbing the home of a deputy police commissioner known for taking bribes. The man, "Big Phil" Creedon, is Molly's father. Molly catches the thieves and "Big Phil" accepts a bribe to let them go, but warns Robert to keep away from Molly. Spike, who has become Robert's servant, steals a pearl necklace during a house party. To save him from arrest, Robert threatens to report Creedon's embezzlement. Molly discreetly returns the pearls, while Creedon accepts the deal, promising not to take any more bribes.

== Cast ==
- Wallace Eddinger as Robert Edgar Willoughby Pitt
- Sydney Deane as Sir Thomas Pitt
- Gertrude Kellar as Lady Julia Blunt
- Tom Forman as Sir Spencer Dreever
- Carol Holloway as Molly Creedon
- Fred Montague as 'Big Phil' Creedon (as Frederick Montague)
- William Elmer as Spike Mullins (as Billy Elmer)
- Frederick Vroom as Macklin, Pitt's Friend
- Francis Tyler as Willett, Pitt's Friend
- Monroe Salisbury as Stutten, Pitt's Friend
- Mr. Machin as Fuller, Pitt's Friend
- Florence Dagmar as Kate
- Lawrence Peyton as Ole Larsen (as Larry Peyton)
- Robert Dunbar as Jeweler
- Lucien Littlefield as Clerk

== Production ==
The film was produced by the Jesse L. Lasky Feature Play Company. Originally, Henry Woodruff was set to star in the film, but fell ill shortly after production began. He was replaced by Eddinger.

== See also ==
- A Gentleman of Leisure (1923)
