= Dynamite Allen =

1921 film directed by Dell Henderson

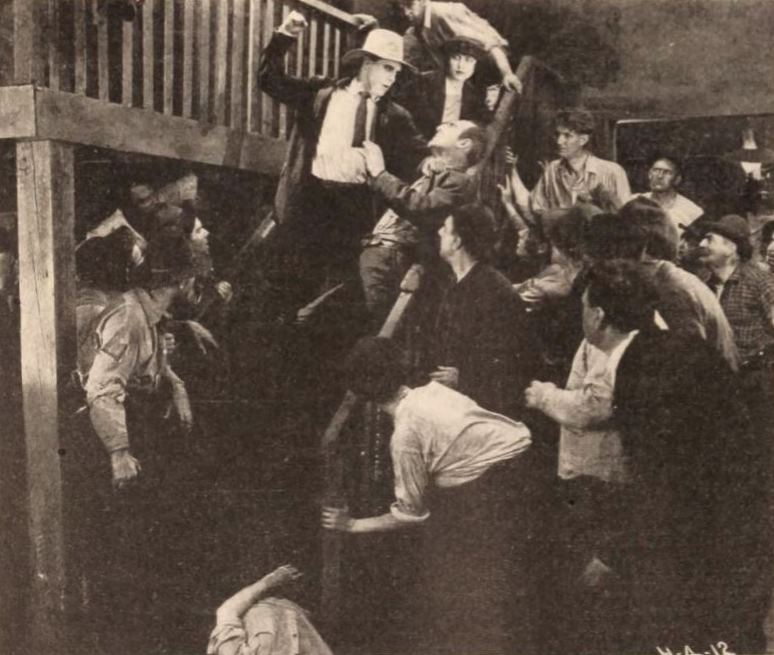
- Still from a magazine
- Directed by: Dell Henderson
- Produced by: William Fox
- Starring: George Walsh
- Cinematography: Charles E. Gilson
- Distributed by: Fox Film Corporation
- Release date: February 20, 1921
- Running time: 5 reels
- Country: United States
- Language: Silent (The english intertitles)

Dynamite Allen is a lost 1921 American silent adventure film produced and distributed by the Fox Film Corporation. It was directed by Dell Henderson and stars athletic George Walsh.

== Cast ==
- George Walsh as Dynamite Allen
- Edna Murphy as Betty Reed
- Dorothy Allen as Jenny Allen
- Carola Parsons as Sue Bennett
- Byron Douglas as Bull Snide
- Jack Baston as Howard Morton (credited as J. Thornton Baston)
- Nellie Parker Spaulding as Mrs. Roger Pitney
- Lettie Ford as Mrs. Sid Allen
- Brigham Royce as Sid Allen
- Frank Nelson as Lawyer Smoot
- Billy Gilbert as Simp Hallett

== See also ==
- 1937 Fox vault fire
