= School Days (1921 film) =

1921 film

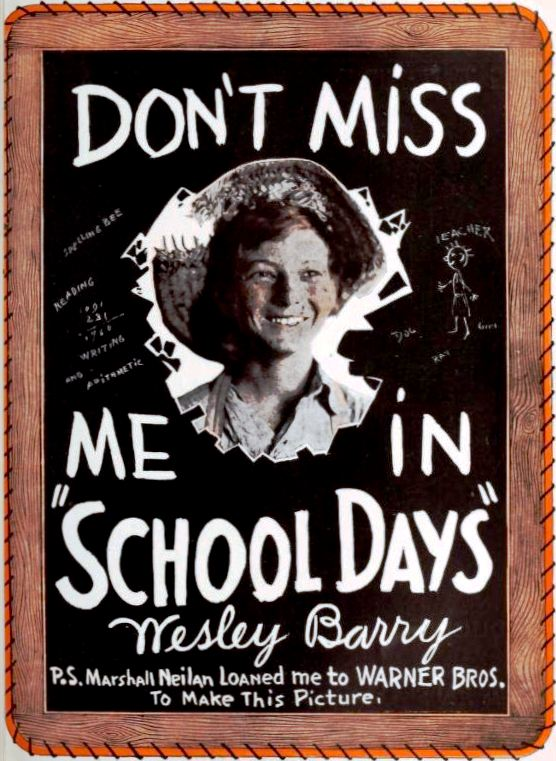
- Advertisement
- Directed by: William Nigh
- Screenplay by: Walter DeLeon; Hoey Lawlor; William Nigh
- Story by: William Nigh
- Produced by: Harry Rapf
- Starring: Wesley Barry; George Lessey; Nellie Parker Spaulding; Margaret Seddon; Arline Blackburn; J.H. Gilmour
- Cinematography: John W. Brown; Sidney Hickox
- Production company: Harry Rapf Productions
- Distributed by: Warner Bros.
- Release date: December 25, 1921
- Running time: 80 minutes
- Country: United States
- Language: Silent (English intertitles)
- Budget: $133,000
- Box office: $578,000 (worldwide rentals)

School Days is a 1921 American silent comedy film directed by William Nigh, written by Walter DeLeon, Hoey Lawlor and William Nigh, and starring Wesley Barry, George Lessey, Nellie Parker Spaulding, Margaret Seddon, Arline Blackburn, and J.H. Gilmour. It was released by Warner Bros. on December 25, 1921 and was Warner's biggest grossing film until The Sea Beast in 1926.

Prints of School Days survive at the George Eastman Museum and UCLA Film & Television Archive with one reel missing.

== Plot ==
As described in a film magazine, Speck Brown is a country boy who has been raised by the hard hearted Deacon Jones. The Deacon insists that Speck attend school, but when the teacher defends the boy against his vicious guardian, Jones turns against her. Speck becomes acquainted with a Stranger who comes to town and Speck realizes his ambition, through the Stranger, to go to New York City and have plenty of money. At a private school he continues his boyish pranks and is snubbed when he gives a party to his wealthy neighbors. A couple of crooks plan to make Speck the goat in a scheme involving his friend Leff, the inventor of a patent clothespin. Disgusted with society and realizing that money cannot buy him happiness or friends, Speck returns to his boyhood home and finds happiness there.

== Cast ==
- Wesley Barry as Speck Brown
- George Lessey as his Guardian, Deacon Jones
- Francis Conlon as His Friend, Leff
- Nellie Parker Spaulding as His Friend's Wife
- Margaret Seddon as His Teacher
- Arline Blackburn as His Sweetheart
- J.H. Gilmour as The Stranger
- John Galsworthy as Mr. Hadley
- Jerome Patrick as Mr. Wallace, an Attorney
- Evelyn Sherman as His Sister
- Arnold Lucy as The Valet

== Box office ==
According to Warner Bros records the film earned $546,000 domestically and $32,000 foreign.
