= The River of Romance =

The River of Romance may refer to:

- The River of Romance, a 1916 silent film drama
- River of Romance, a 1929 American drama film
