= The Power Within (1921 film) =

1921 silent film

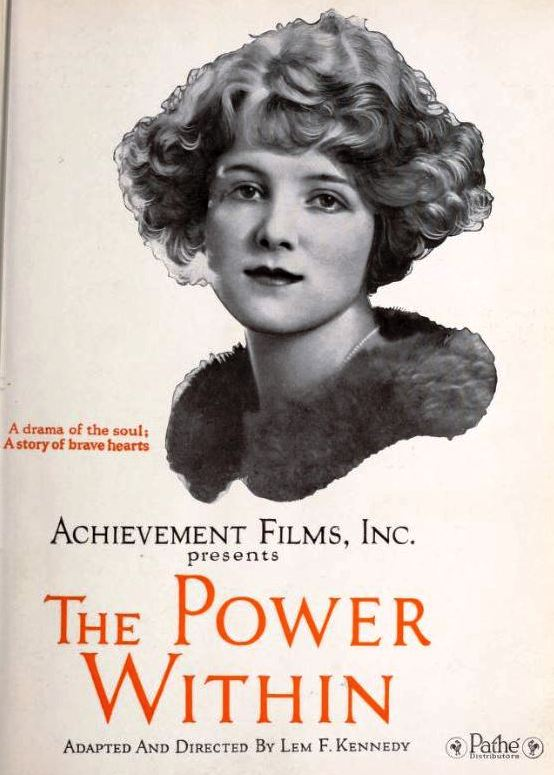
- Directed by: Lem F. Kennedy
- Written by: Lem F. Kennedy; Robert Norwood
- Starring: William H. Tooker; Nellie Parker Spaulding; Robert Kenyon
- Cinematography: George Peters
- Production company: Achievement Films
- Distributed by: Pathé Exchange
- Release date: December 18, 1921
- Running time: 60 minutes
- Country: United States
- Languages: Silent; English intertitles

The Power Within is a 1921 American silent drama film directed by Lem F. Kennedy and starring William H. Tooker, Nellie Parker Spaulding and Pauline Garon.

== Cast ==
- William H. Tooker as Job Armstrong
- Nellie Parker Spaulding as Mrs. Armstrong
- Robert Kenyon as Bob Armstrong
- Dorothy Allen as Dorothy Armstrong
- Robert Bentley as Count Bazaine
- Pauline Garon as Pauline
- William Zohlmen as Little Bobby

== Bibliography ==
- Liebman, Roy. The Wampas Baby Stars: A Biographical Dictionary, 1922-1934. McFarland, 2000.
- Munden, Kenneth White. The American Film Institute Catalog of Motion Pictures Produced in the United States, Part 1. University of California Press, 1997.
