= Kate Jordan =

Irish-American novelist and playwright (1862–1926)

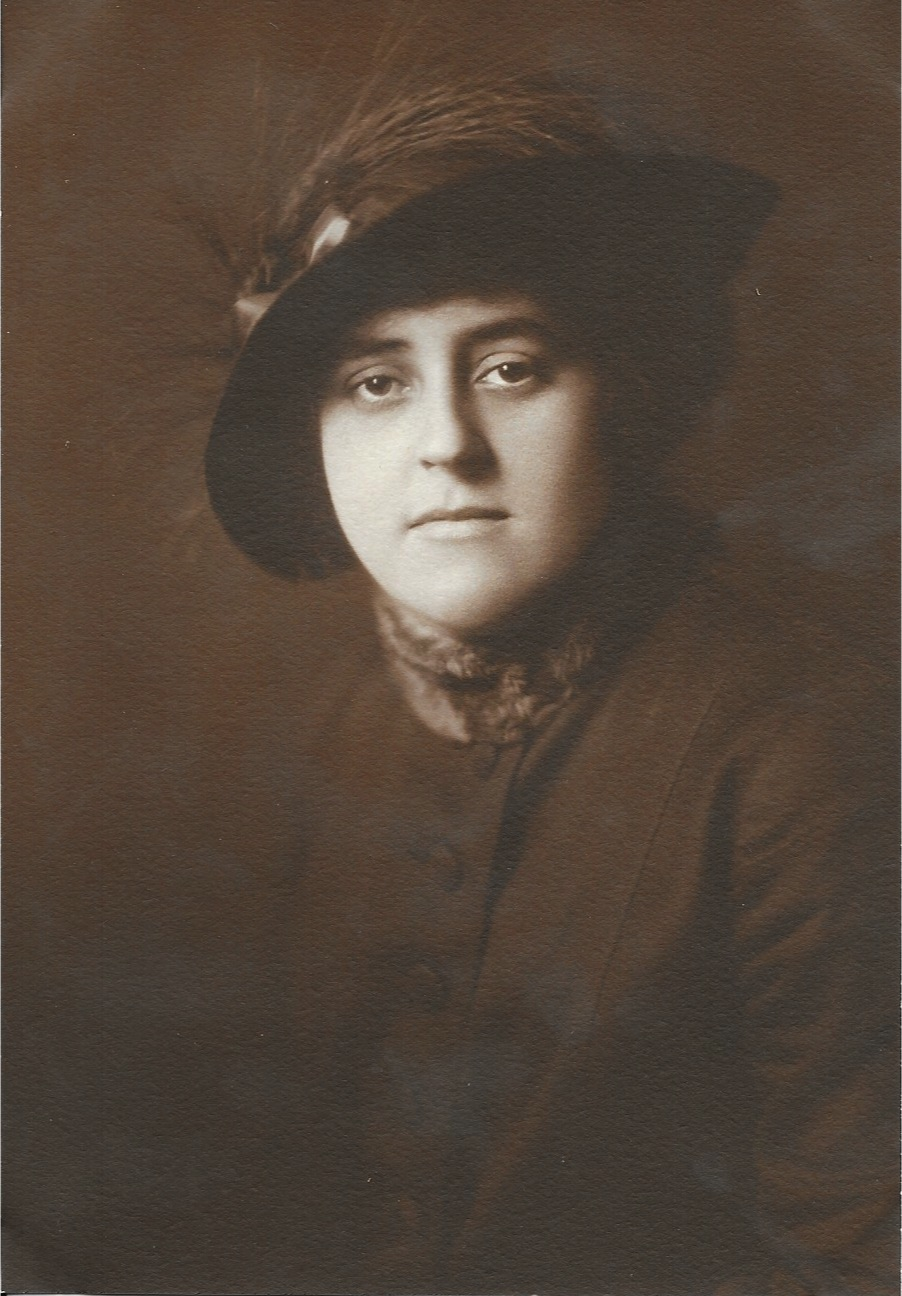
- Born: 23 December 1862; Dublin, Ireland
- Died: 20 June 1926 (aged 63); Mountain Lakes, New Jersey, US
- Occupations: novelist and playwright

Kate Jordan (23 December 1862 – 20 June 1926) was an Irish-American novelist and playwright.

== Early life and education ==
Kate Jordan was born in Dublin on 23 December 1862. She was the daughter of the academic, Michael James Jordan, and Catherine Jordan (née Mulvey). She had three sisters and three brothers. The family emigrated to the United States when Jordan was 3, settling in New York City, with her father taking a position as a professor.

Jordan was educated at private schools and by tutors at home, beginning to write at a young age. A teacher warned her mother that "either she will one day write fiction or she is one of those natural liars to whom truth is unattractive." She published her first story at age 12, encouraged by her father.

== Career ==
Her stories and poems were published in numerous journals and magazines including The Saturday Evening Post, Collier's, McClure's, and The Century Magazine. She built up a large readership, with one of her most popular pieces, The Kiss of Gold appearing in October 1892 in Lippincott's Monthly Magazine. Jordan wrote and published a number of novels, mostly melodramas but well received critically. Trouble-the-House her last novel from 1921 has autobiographical details.

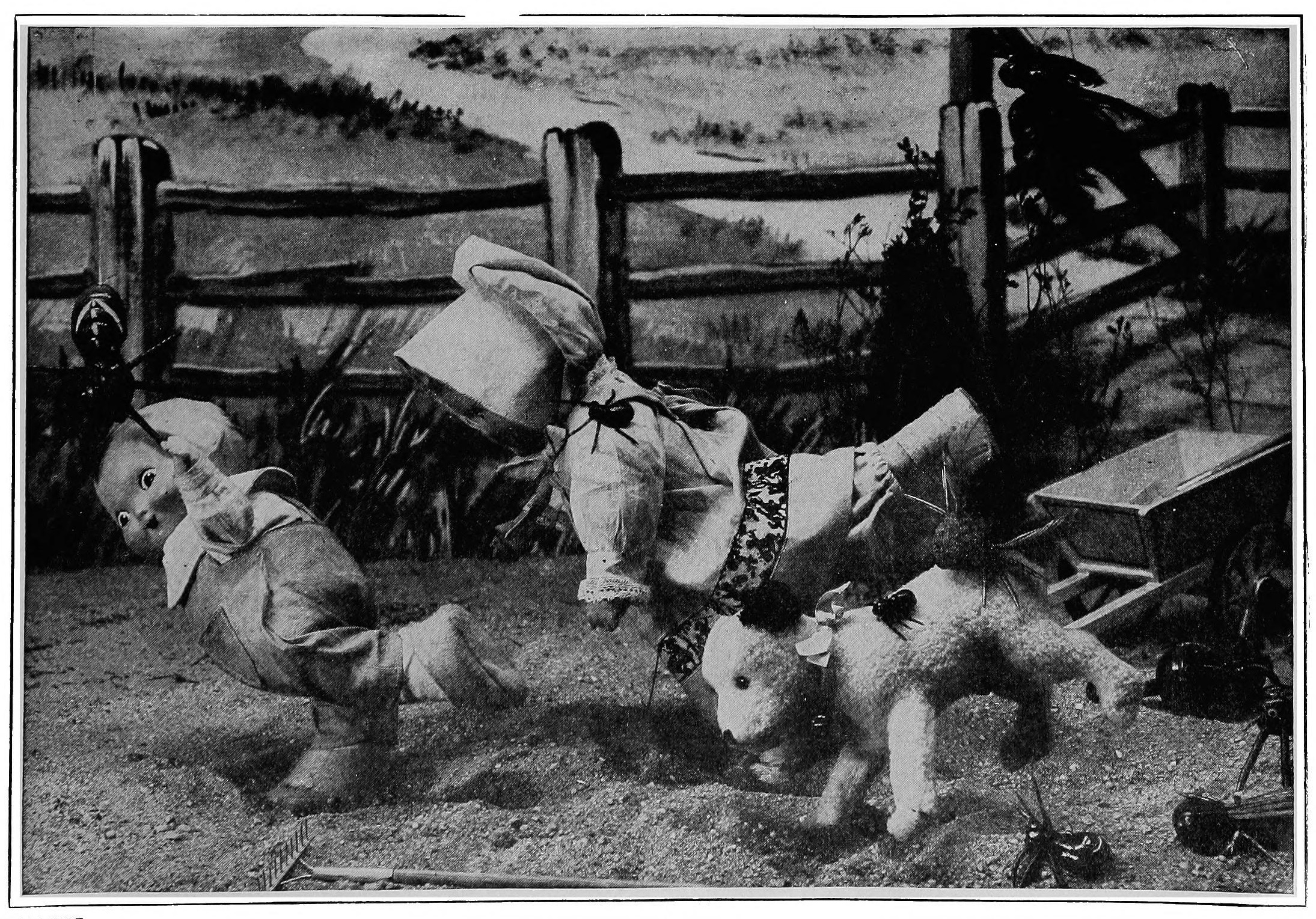
Happifat dolls in a dramatic scene

Jordan both wrote and adapted a number of plays. One four-act melodrama, The Masked Woman, ran for 115 performances in 1922–1923. Her plays were not as well received as her novels. Her 1917 The Happifats and the Grouch was a children's book. She designed a range of dolls, Happifats, to accompany her book. These dolls were bisque and made in Germany by Borgfeldt from 1913 to 1921, and Japan. Her 1905 novel, Time, the Comedian, was adapted as a silent film by Fanny and Frederick Hatton which starred Mae Busch.

Jordan travelled extensively, including long stays in England and France. She was a member of the London Pen and Brush Club and the Lyceum, the Writer's Club in London, and was associated with the Society of American Dramatists and the Authors’ League of America. From 1890 to 1920 she was a member of the Cos Cob art colony.

== Later life ==
Jordan married Frederic M. Vermilye, a New York broker, in 1897, but continued to publish under her maiden name. The couple divorced a few years later.

Towards the end of her life, Jordan suffered from depression and hypertension. She developed insomnia due to anxiety over finishing a novel. Jordan left her residence at the Hotel Touraine in April 1926 to live with her niece, Mrs George A. Reeder, in Mountain Lakes, New Jersey. She boarded the Boontown-Denville trolley on 20 June 1926, when other passengers noted her nervous demeanour. Her body was found the next morning amongst scrub pines; she was holding a bottle of Lysol. Her death was ruled a suicide, and her ashes were interred in Sleepy Hollow Cemetery, Tarrytown, New York.

== Selected works ==
- The Other House (1892)
- A Circle in the Sand (1898)
- A Luncheon at Nick's (1903)
- The Pompadour's Protégé (1903)
- Time, the Comedian (1905)
- Mrs. Dakon (1909)
- The Right Road (1911)
- The Creeping Tides (1913)
- Secret Springs (1914)
- "Castles in the Air" (1915 - short story published in the Saturday Evening Post)
- Against the Winds (1919)
- The Next Corner (1921)
