= Fast Life (1932 film) =

1932 film

- Directed by: Harry A. Pollard
- Screenplay by: Byron Morgan; Ralph Spence
- Based on: Let's Go; 1930 novel by E.J. Rath
- Produced by: Harry A. Pollard
- Starring: William Haines; Madge Evans
- Cinematography: Harold Wenstrom
- Edited by: Hugh Wynn
- Distributed by: Metro-Goldwyn-Mayer
- Release date: December 16, 1932
- Running time: 82 minutes
- Country: United States
- Language: English

Fast Life is a 1932 American Pre-Code romantic comedy film starring William Haines and Madge Evans, directed by Harry A. Pollard and is based upon the story Let's Go by E.J. Rath.

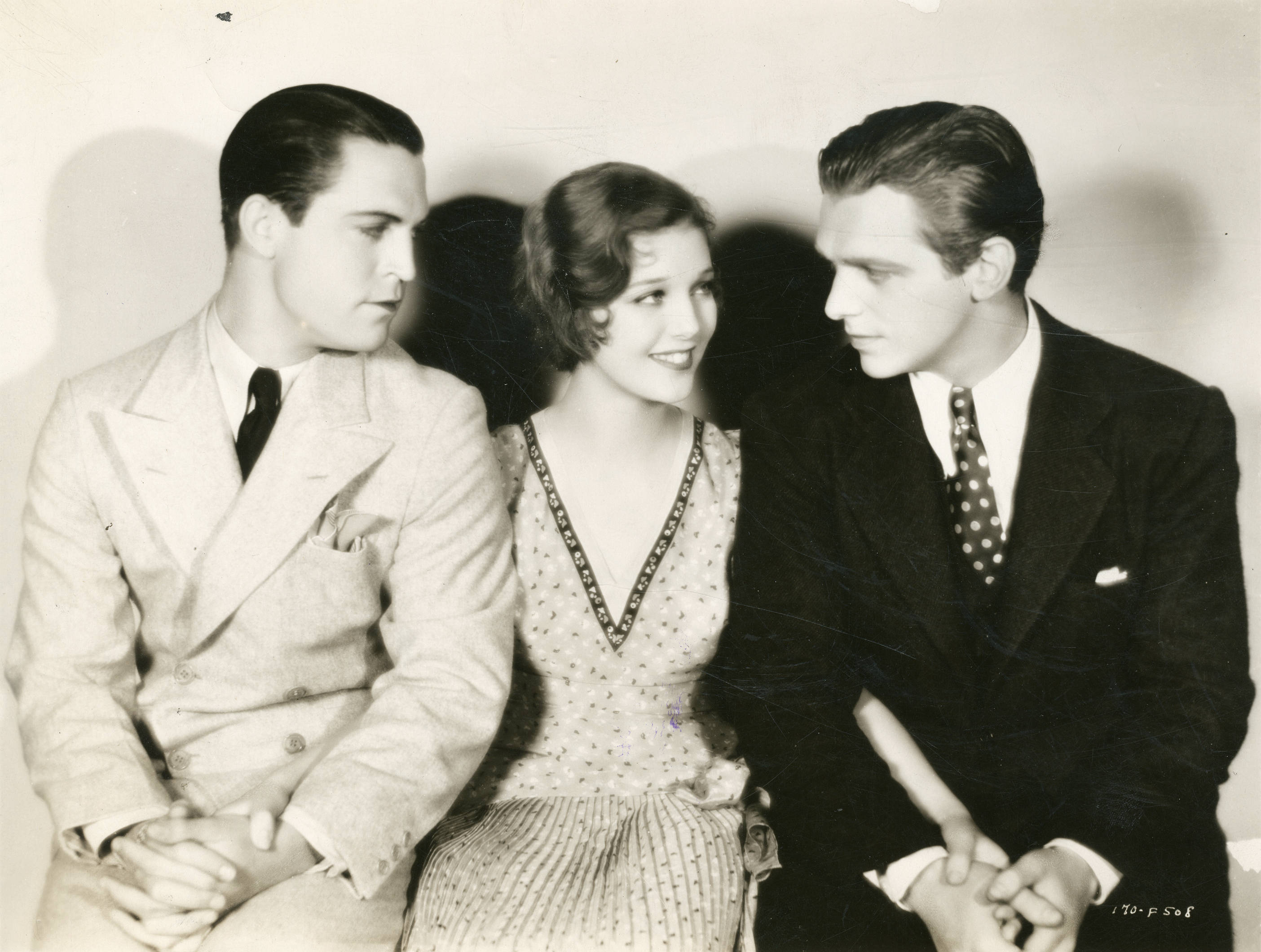
Scene from Fast Life (1932 film)

== Plot ==
Two men leave the US Navy after having served ten years as a sailor. Sandy is one of them and later invents a carburetor that should increase the speed that powered boats will run. When testing it, he accidentally sinks a boat and has to pay for it. Now he is broke and enters a boat contest. To win, he has to invent the fastest boat in the world.

== Cast (in credits order) ==
- William Haines as Sandy
- Madge Evans as Shirley
- Conrad Nagel as Burton
- Arthur Byron as Jameson
- Cliff Edwards as Bumpy
- Warburton Gamble as Halstead
- Kenneth Thomson as Mr. Williams
- Albert Gran as Van Vrinken
- Pete Smith as Race Announcer
- Karl Dane as guard on dock

== Reception ==
TIME magazine panned the film as "a flagrantly foolish little picture" and that "Unless they are particularly enthusiastic about speedboats, of which the film contains a few good shots, there is no special reason for adults to see Fast Life".
