= What a Man (1930 film) =

1930 film

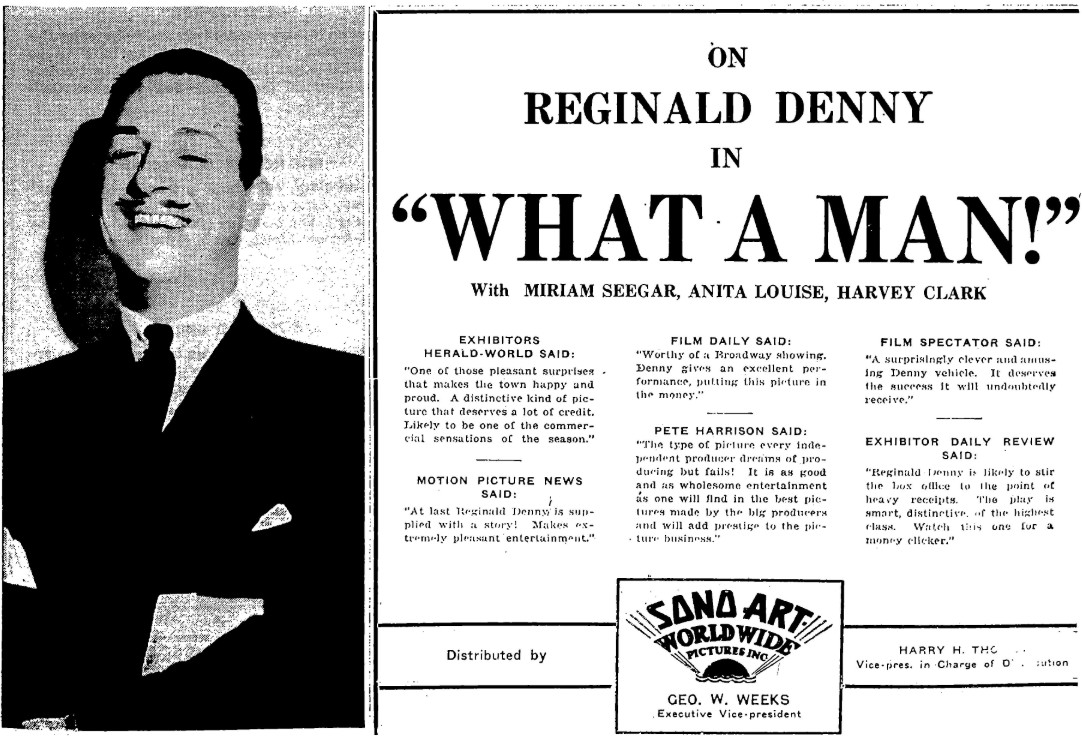
- Advertisement
- Directed by: George Crone
- Written by: Courtenay Savage (play); E.J. Rath (novel); Harvey Gates; A.A. Kline
- Starring: Reginald Denny; Miriam Seegar; Harvey Clark; Lucille Ward
- Cinematography: Arthur L. Todd
- Edited by: Harry Chandlee
- Production company: Sono Art-World Wide Pictures
- Distributed by: Sono Art-World Wide Pictures
- Release date: June 1, 1930
- Running time: 72 minutes
- Country: United States
- Language: English

What a Man is a 1930 American pre-Code romantic comedy film directed by George Crone and starring Reginald Denny, Miriam Seegar, and Harvey Clark. It was an adaptation of the play They All Want Something by Courtenay Savage, which was itself based on a novel by E.J. Rath. A separate Spanish language version, Thus Is Life, was made at the same time. The film was remade in 1938 as Merrily We Live. It is also known by the alternative title The Gentleman Chauffeur.

== Plot ==
A British ex-Grenadier Guards officer moves to America, but struggles to find work. After he is employed as a chauffeur to a wealthy family, he falls in love with his employer's daughter.

== Cast ==
- Reginald Denny as Wade Rawlins
- Miriam Seegar as Eileen Kilbourne
- Harvey Clark as Mr. Kilbourne
- Lucille Ward as Mrs. Kilbourne
- Carlyle Moore Jr. as Kane Kilbourne
- Anita Louise as Marion Kilbourne
- Norma Drew as Elsie Thayer
- Christiane Yves as Marquise de la Fresne
- Charles Coleman as William, the Butler
- Greta Granstedt as Hanna, the Maid

== Bibliography ==
- Waldman, Harry. Hollywood and the Foreign Touch: A Dictionary of Foreign Filmmakers and Their Films from America, 1910-1995. Scarecrow Press, 1996.
