= Slippy McGee (1923 film) =

1923 film by Wesley Ruggles

- Lantern slide
- Directed by: Wesley Ruggles
- Written by: Marie Conway Oemler
- Produced by: Oliver Morosco
- Starring: Wheeler Oakman; Colleen Moore; Sam De Grasse; Edmund Stevens; Edith Yorke
- Cinematography: Allen G. Siegler
- Edited by: Charles G. Clarke
- Production company: Oliver Morosco Productions
- Distributed by: Associated First National Pictures
- Release date: June 11, 1923
- Running time: 7 reels
- Country: United States
- Language: Silent (English intertitles)

Slippy McGee is a 1923 American silent drama film directed by Wesley Ruggles and based on the book Slippy McGee: Sometimes Known as the Butterfly Man by Marie Conway Oemler that was published in 1917. The film was an Oliver Morosco Production released by Associated First National and featured actress Colleen Moore as Mary Virginia. It is not known whether the film survives.

== Plot ==
The title is also the moniker of a renowned safe-cracker, Slippy McGee, who has always managed to evade capture until his latest job, when he is wounded. He escapes aboard a freight train, bound for parts unknown, and finds himself in the town of Appleborro. There, he is discovered and cared for by Father De Rance and Mary Virginia. His leg is amputated, and during his recovery in Appleborro, the town's influence causes him to reform. He becomes interested in the local butterflies, De Rance's hobby, and becomes so knowledgeable in them that he becomes a published expert. Slippy has fallen in love with Mary Virginia, but she plans to marry Lawrence Mayne. However, George Inglesby determines that he wants Mary Virginia for himself, and decides to blackmail Mary Virginia into marrying him using incriminating letters he has in his possession. Wishing Mary to be happy, Slippy resorts to his old ways, breaking into the safe where the letters are kept and thus freeing Mary Virginia of the power George has over her.

== Cast ==
- Colleen Moore as Mary Virginia
- Wheeler Oakman as Slippy McGee
- Sam De Grasse as Father De Rance
- Edmund Stevens as George Inglesby
- Edith Yorke as Madame De Rance
- Lloyd Whitlock as Howard Hunter
- Pat O'Malley as Lawrence Mayne
- Mary Connor
- William Foster as Judge Mayne
- Katherine Healy
- Frances Smith
- Bardell Wheeler

== Production ==
Production on the film began in June 1921 with Colleen's return from New York and Florida, where she was making The Lotus Eater with John Barrymore which was directed by Marshall Neilan. Upon her return to Los Angeles, she left again after a few weeks for location work at Natchez, Mississippi, which filled in for the fictional town of Appleborro. Colleen was taken with the town, and spoke well of the hospitality she and the Slippy McGee troupe were treated to. It was not the first film production the town had hosted. The film would not be released until two year later, in 1923.

== Footnotes ==
- Natchez Democrat, July 12, 1921, page 4.
- "Natchez Is on the Map," by Grace Kingsley, Los Angeles Times, August 14, 1921, page III1 and page III16.

== Bibliography ==
- Silent Star, by Colleen Moore.
- Jeff Codori (2012), Colleen Moore; A Biography of the Silent Film Star, McFarland Publishing,(Print ISBN 978-0-7864-4969-9, EBook ISBN 978-0-7864-8899-5).
- Colleen Moore research/history project page
