= The Light That Failed =

1891 novel by Rudyard Kipling

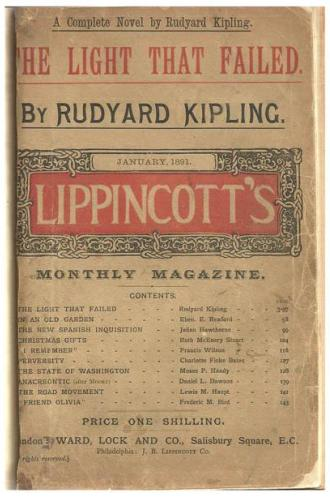
- First edition
- Author: Rudyard Kipling
- Language: English
- Genre: Fiction
- Set in: London
- Published: January 1891 by Lippincott's Monthly Magazine
- Publication place: United States
- Pages: 339
- OCLC: 542892
- Dewey Decimal: 823.8
- LC Class: PR4854
- Text: The Light That Failed at Wikisource

The Light That Failed is the first novel by the Nobel Prize-winning English author Rudyard Kipling, first published in Lippincott's Monthly Magazine in January 1891. Most of the novel is set in London, but many important events throughout the story occur in Sudan and Port Said. It follows the life of Dick Heldar, an artist and painter who goes blind, and his unrequited love for his childhood playmate, Maisie.

Kipling wrote the novel when he was 26 years old, and it is semi-autobiographical, being based upon his own unrequited love for Florence Garrard. Though it was poorly received by critics, the novel has managed to remain in print for over a century. It was also adapted into a play, two silent films and a film with sound.

== Background ==
By the time Kipling returned to England in 1889, he was well on his way to literary fame due to his successful short stories. As a novel was expected from him at this point in his career, he began to write The Light That Failed on a very short deadline of three months. The novel's inspiration was his failed relationship with Florence Garrard, whom he had first met when he was boarding with his sister in Southsea.

After returning to India to work as a reporter, Kipling remained in touch with Garrard through letters. She ended their relationship after two years, leaving Kipling devastated, as he had believed that they were engaged. He met her again in 1890 in London and attempted to reignite their relationship. He also visited her in Paris, where she was studying in the Académie Julian. It is not known what happened between them, but he was never to see Garrard again.

Although most of the novel is set in London, the military campaigns are set in Sudan and Egypt, especially in Port Said and Suakin. The Mahdist War serves as a background to Dick's first encounter with a war correspondent named Torpenhow and his death during the reconquest.

== Plot summary ==
The story begins with Dick and Maisie as orphan children in a seaside boarding house under the care of Mrs. Jennet (a sadist drawn from Kipling's own childhood experience with a Mrs. Holloway). Dick confesses his infatuation with Maisie, but she informs him that she will soon be leaving to complete her education.

Years later, Dick is working as a painter and artist among the British armed forces in Sudan. He meets a war correspondent named Torpenhow who, witnessing his skill, arranges for Dick to be hired by the syndicate that he works for. The two men quickly strike up a friendship and help each other in their respective trades. Dick is later injured by a sword-cut to the head and spends a night in delirium, moaning about Maisie. Once the campaign is over, Dick returns to London where he eventually reunites with Torpenhow. His war sketches have drawn attention in England, and when his former employers try to withhold his submitted works, Dick bullies their representative into returning them. He shares a rented apartment with Torpenhow in London where the two, along with a few other friends, spend their time working and discussing "Art". Dick again runs into Maisie, who is also working as a painter and a student under Dick's former teacher, Kami. He asks her about their relationship and, though she rebuffs his advances, she asks him to visit her every Sunday as she values his advice about her work. He relents, assuming that she would grow to love him as he loves her. He also meets Maisie's roommate, a red-haired girl, who immediately despises him.

While discussing her work, Dick begins to argue with Maisie about her attempt to paint the "Melancolia" from the book The City of Dreadful Night. Dick says that it is beyond her ability and challenges her that he can do it better. Maisie soon departs for Paris to work under Kami for some months, and Dick sees her off at the harbour. He finally convinces her to give him a kiss, making the red-haired girl furious. When he returns to his room, he discovers that Torpenhow has brought in a pretty young prostitute named Bessie, whom he found collapsed in the hall. Taken by her face, Dick convinces the girl to return to his studio so that he can paint her in return for payment. Eventually, Bessie tries to seduce Torpenhow, but they are interrupted by Dick, who rebukes Torpenhow and sends him away. Bessie is furious at Dick but continues to model for him because of the money. Dick hits upon his notion for the "Melancolia", whom he models on Bessie, but discovers to his horror that he is going blind due to a past battle injury. He still manages to complete the painting a week after Torpenhow returns, relying on whisky to help his failing vision. Bessie, however, destroys the painting in revenge for his earlier interference. Torpenhow hides the fact from Dick, who is now completely blind, regretting that he ever helped the girl.

When news arrives of a new campaign in Sudan, Torpenhow visits Maisie in Paris and persuades her to meet Dick in the hope that she will look after him. Though visibly anguished, she refuses, and Dick gently asks her to leave. He hides this fact from Torpenhow, who leaves for the campaign with their friends. Dick meets with Bessie again, and upon learning of the Melancolia's destruction, decides to leave for the campaign as well. With help from an acquaintance in Port Said, he reaches the battlefield at the very start of a battle but is killed by a bullet to the head.

== Themes ==
A major theme that runs throughout the novel is unrequited love, embodied in Dick's love for Maisie and his ultimately futile attempts at getting her to fall in love with him in return. In contrast, the novel also explores the friendship between Dick and Torpenhow with The Guardian noting it to be "the only emotionally satisfying relationship" in the novel. Kipling also depicts the cruelty and brutality in war as well as daily life, in events such as Torpenhow gouging out an Arab soldier's eye, Dick's bullying of the syndicate representative, his treatment of Bessie and his response to the gunning down of enemy soldiers in the final chapter. He focuses also on art and the role of the artist, and Dick's paintings form a central feature, especially the Melancolia, which is ultimately destroyed. Kipling especially derides the commercialisation of art when Dick is chastised by his friends for his arrogance at his successes and love for money. He contrasts it with Dick's sarcasm for having to clean a graphic portrait of a Sudanese rifleman to appeal to the general public.

The novel also explores masculinity and contrasts it with feminine traits and roles as it was during the Victorian period. This is evident in Dick's experiences as a war artist, which is shown to have given him a wider perspective on his art and is something that Maisie will never experience. Kipling also shows the effect of childhood abuse with Mrs. Jennett's treatment of Dick causing him to become a "natural liar" and "unkempt in body and savage in soul." This is reflected in his later bullying of the syndicate's representative.

The novel also deals with blindness and Dick's slide into despair and helplessness due to the loss of his ability to work and the resulting abandonment by Maisie. Dick sums it up with the statement that "... it is better to remain alone and suffer only the misery of being alone, so long as it is possible to find distraction in daily work. When that resource goes the man is to be pitied and left alone".

== Publication history ==
The Light That Failed was initially set to be published first by John W. Lovell in New York, but it was delayed, allowing for Lippincott's Magazine to publish it first in January 1891. The novel, Kipling's first, was published in four different versions over a period of two years. The Lippincott edition had twelve chapters and a happy ending. Kipling, however, had originally written a fifteen-chapter version that ended with Dick's death. Deciding that this would be too sad for public consumption, he changed it to end with the protagonists' engagement. Lippincott paid Kipling $800 for the novel.

The fifteen-chapter edition would later be published as a hardback "Standard edition" by MacMillan with a prefatory note that stated: "... The Light That Failed as it was originally conceived by the Writer." It is believed that Kipling's mother had pressed to release the happy ending, which Kipling later regretted, leading to the note in the "Standard edition" of the novel.

== Critical reception ==
The Light That Failed was poorly received by critics in the main. Jad Adams calls the novel richly revealing even though it was badly reviewed, especially its man-loving and misogynistic undercurrents. He calls it "a metaphor for the failing gallantry of 19th-century man confronting the new woman." Andrew Lycett, in his biography of Kipling, called it a "grown-up novel by an emotionally immature man." It has been variously derided as "sentimental, unstructured, melodramatic, chauvinistic, and implausible." Kipling admitted in his autobiography that the novel was a conte (short tale of adventure) and not a built book. Lord Birkenhead calls the novel a "rotten apple" among Kipling's other published works. George Orwell, in an unsigned review of Rudyard Kipling, by Edward Shanks, says, "Curiously enough, he [Shanks] has a very low opinion of that excellent novel The Light That Failed."

== Adaptations ==
A play by George Fleming, starring Johnston Forbes-Robertson, his wife Gertrude Elliott, and Sydney Valentine, was first staged in the West End from February to April 1903 and moved on to Broadway in November, making the story more famous. It was made into a 1916 silent film by Pathé, with Robert Edeson and José Collins, a 1923 silent film by Famous Players–Lasky, and a 1939 film by Paramount, starring Ronald Colman as Heldar, with Muriel Angelus, Ida Lupino, and Walter Huston. It was also adapted for television in the US in 1961 by the Breck Shampoo Company, with Richard Basehart starring as Heldar and Susan Harrison as Maisie.

The Light That Failed was adapted as a radio play by Sam Dann as part of Himan Brown's CBS Radio Mystery Theater series, and broadcast on 28 February 1977.
