= A Gentleman of Leisure (1923 film) =

1923 film by Joseph Henabery

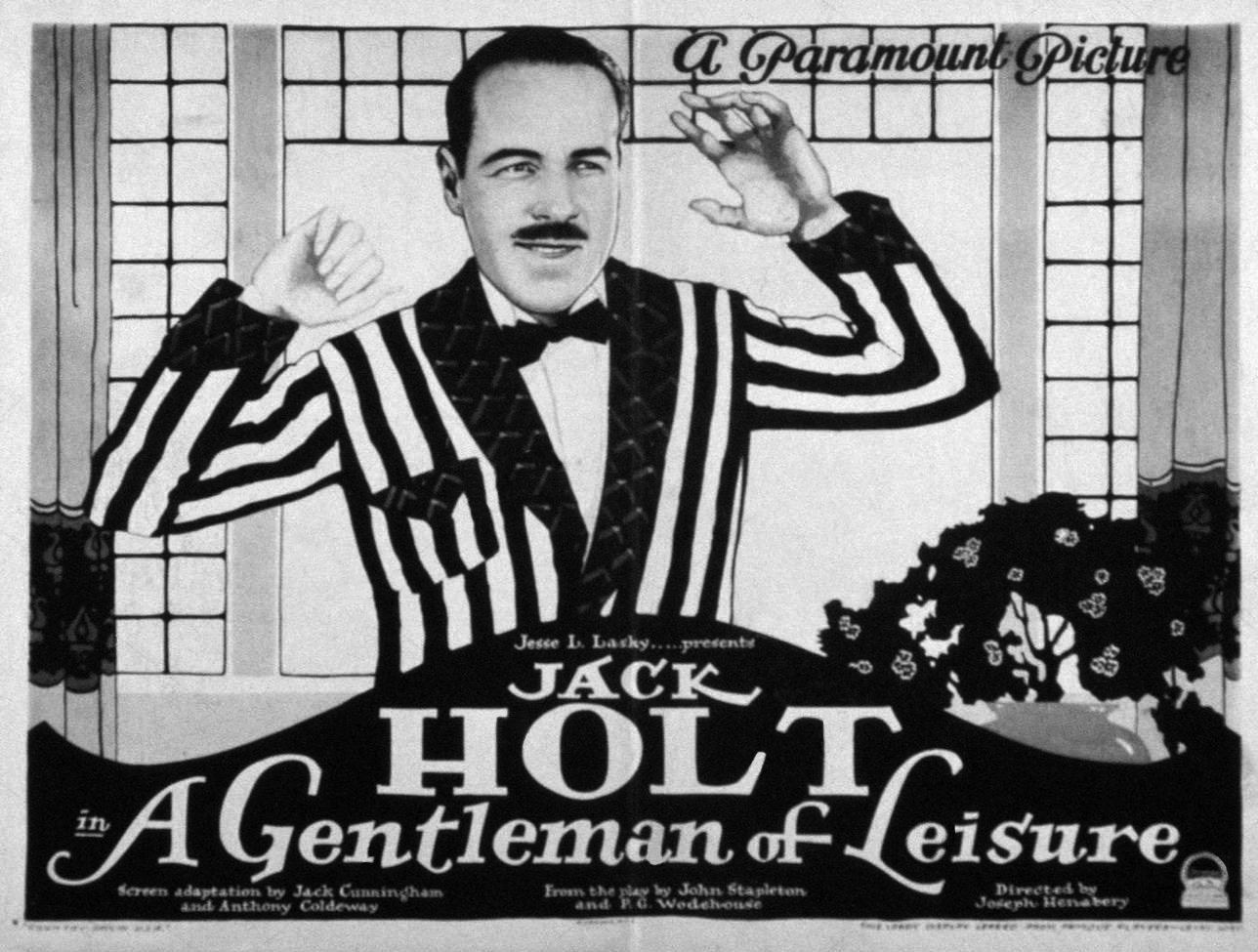
- Lobby card
- Directed by: Joseph Henabery
- Written by: Jack Cunningham (scenario); Anthony Coldeway
- Based on: A Gentleman of Leisure by P. G. Wodehouse and John Stapleton
- Produced by: Adolph Zukor; Jesse Lasky
- Cinematography: Faxon M. Dean
- Distributed by: Paramount Pictures
- Release date: July 15, 1923
- Running time: 60 minutes
- Country: United States
- Language: Silent (English intertitles)

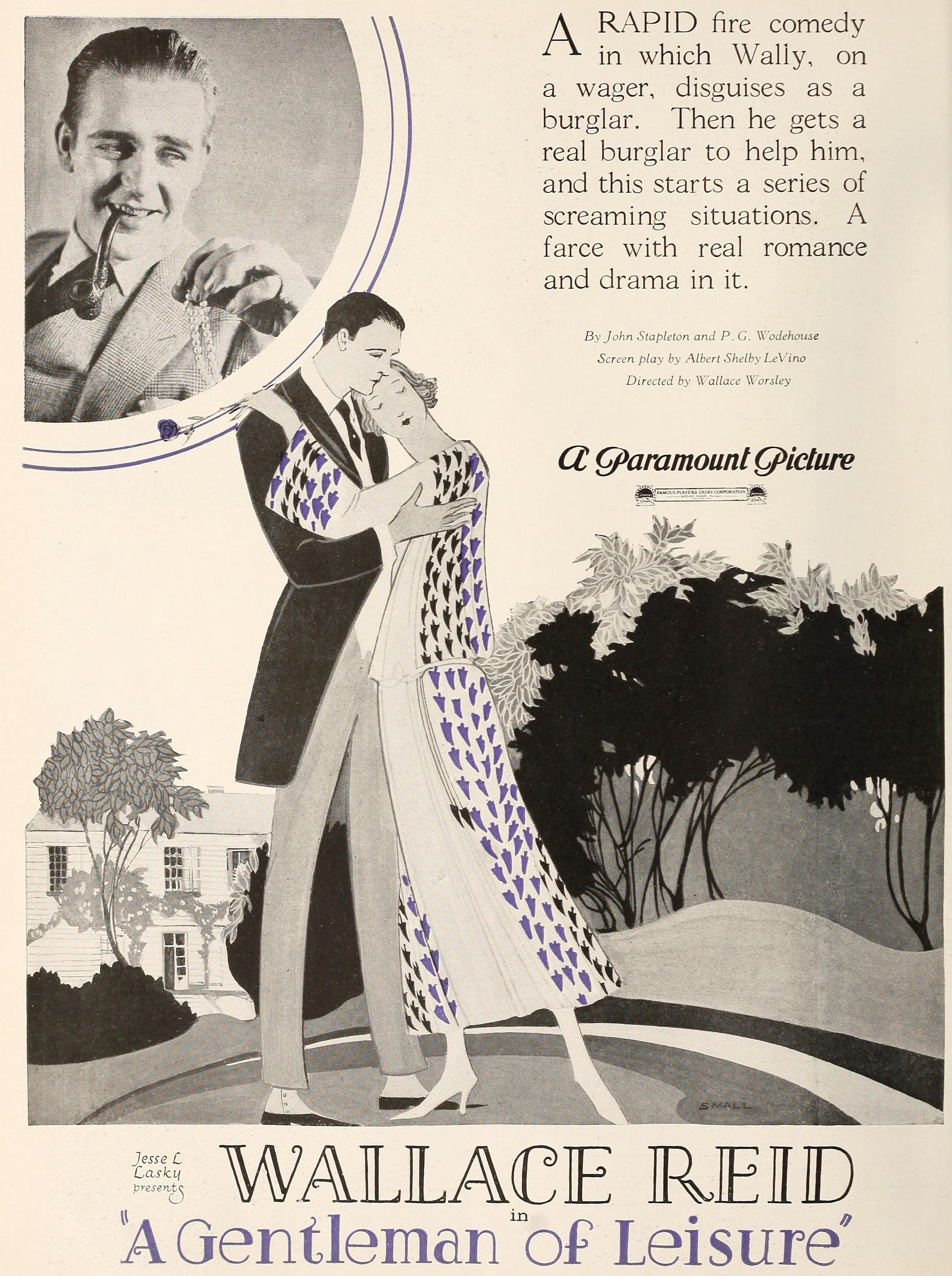
Advertisement from Exhibitor's Trade Review when Wallace Reid was still listed to star. Eventually, Jack Holt played the title role, replacing Reid, with Joseph Henabery replacing Wallace Worsley as director.

A Gentleman of Leisure is a 1923 American silent comedy film produced by Famous Players–Lasky and distributed by Paramount Pictures. It was directed by Joseph Henabery and stars Jack Holt. The film is based on the 1910 novel A Gentleman of Leisure by P. G. Wodehouse. It was adapted into a play by Wodehouse and John Stapleton. It is also a remake of the 1915 film A Gentleman of Leisure.

== Cast ==
- Jack Holt as Robert Pitt
- Casson Ferguson as Sir Spencer Deever
- Sigrid Holmquist as Molly Creedon
- Alec B. Francis as Sir John Blount (credited as Alec Francis)
- Adele Farrington as Lady Blount
- Frank Nelson as Spike Mullen
- Alfred Allen as Big Phil Creedon
- Nadeen Paul as Maid
- Alice Queensberry as Chorus

== Trivia ==
Originally Wallace Reid was to star in this, but he died in early 1923.

== Preservation ==
In February of 2021, A Gentleman of Leisure was cited by the National Film Preservation Board on their Lost U.S. Silent Feature Films list and is therefore presumed lost.

== See also ==
- A Gentleman of Leisure (1915)
