= A Gentleman of Leisure =

1910 novel by P. G. Wodehouse

A Gentleman of Leisure The Intrusion of Jimmy
- First edition (U.S.)
- Author: P. G. Wodehouse
- Language: English
- Publisher: W. J. Watt & Co.
- Publication date: 11 May 1910
- Publication place: United States
- Media type: Print

A Gentleman of Leisure is a novel by P. G. Wodehouse. The basic plot first appeared in a novella, The Gem Collector, in the December 1909 issue of Ainslee's Magazine.

The novel was substantially revised and expanded for publication as a book under the title The Intrusion of Jimmy by W. J. Watt & Co., New York, on 11 May 1910. It was serialised as The Intrusions of Jimmy in the British weekly magazine Tit-Bits between 11 June and 10 September before being published as A Gentleman of Leisure by Alston Rivers Ltd, London, on 15 November 1910. There are minor textual differences between the American and British editions of the book. A Gentleman of Leisure was adapted for the stage in 1911 and has twice been filmed, in 1915 and 1923.

== Main characters ==
- Sir James Willoughby Pitt, baronet, a well-off young man and former jewel thief
  - Spike Mullins, a thief, who becomes Pitt's valet
- Molly McEachern, a pretty girl Pitt saw on a boat
  - John McEachern, Molly's father, a policeman
- "Spennie", Earl of Dreever, an impecunious young Earl
  - Lady Julia Blunt, Spennie's imperious aunt
  - Sir Thomas Blunt, her wealthy husband
- Charteris, a keen organiser of amateur theatre
- Hargate, a card-sharp who preys on Lord Dreever

== Novella plot (The Gem Collector) ==
Sir James Willoughby Pitt, baronet, a former jewel thief who was expelled from Eton and has since inherited wealth, is in London and bored with life. Seeing a stranger in need in a restaurant, he comes to his aid, and so befriends Spennie Blunt. He later encounters Spike Mullins, a former American criminal associate, who has fled to England and fallen on hard times. Pitt takes him in.

Spennie invites Jimmy to his home, Corven Abbey in Shropshire (Dreever Castle in the later version), and he decides to take Spike with him as his valet.

While there, Jimmy encounters Molly McEachern, with whom he was romantically linked (at least by Spike) while in New York. Molly is the daughter of John McEachern, formerly a corrupt New York police officer, now prominent in English society and married to Spennie's mother.

The broad outline of the plot then continues as in A Gentleman of Leisure, though the tone is substantially different: in The Gem Collector, Jimmy had been a jewel thief; in A Gentleman of Leisure he merely pretends to be one.

== Full plot (A Gentleman of Leisure) ==
Wealthy Jimmy Pitt falls for a girl on the boat back from England. In New York he finds his old cronies excited by Love, the Cracksman, a new play in the Raffles vein. He makes a bet with his friend Arthur Mifflin, star of the play – he will break into a house that very night. Brooding on how to accomplish such a feat, his house is broken into by Spike Mullins, whom he persuades to accompany him on his mission.

They pick a house recommended to Mullins by a friend, and break in, only to be caught by John McEachern, whom they convince that Pitt is a prominent London jewel thief. He arranges to be paid off, but his daughter Molly enters, and she and Jimmy recognise each other from their boat-trip. To keep his graft a secret, McEachern pretends to Molly that Pitt is a friendly passer-by.

After a year wandering the globe, unable to find or forget Molly, Pitt is in London once more. Seeing a stranger in need in a restaurant, he comes to his aid, and so befriends Lord Dreever, known to all as Spennie. Wandering the streets with his new friend, they run into Spike Mullins, Jimmy's only link to Molly, who has fallen on hard times. Pitt takes him in.

Next day, Spennie invites Jimmy to Dreever Castle, and he decides to take Spike with him as his valet. Spennie's Aunt Julia, we learn, owns a valuable necklace, and her husband Sir Thomas has hired a detective to protect it.

Arriving at Dreever, there is no space in the car, so Jimmy volunteers to walk. He catches a riderless horse, and when he finds the rider, it is none other than Molly, who is also staying at Dreever. Her father is highly suspicious of Jimmy, even more so when he sees Spike also on the premises, but is unable to denounce them for fear of his own secret coming out, so he hires a detective to keep an eye on them.

The house party prepares for some amateur theatricals, and it becomes clear to Jimmy that a plot is afoot to bring Molly and Spennie together. They are soon bullied into an engagement, although Spennie loves another and Molly sees Spennie as a little boy. Pitt makes an enemy of Hargate, a hustler he recognises trying to fleece Spennie, while Spike spots the detectives hired by McEachern and Blunt around the house.

Jimmy dodges them, and drags Molly out onto the lake, where he declares his love; she returns it, but happiness is scuppered by her fear of upsetting her father. Meanwhile, Spennie is once more sharped by the hustler, who asks him to drive Pitt from the castle, and Spike, after observing Sir Thomas' detective arrest Galer, the man hired by McEachern, takes advantage of the lull in vigilance to swipe the precious necklace.

Spennie, desperate to repay his debts, is reduced to stealing from his uncle, but is caught and stopped by Molly. Hearing a noise, they hide in Sir Thomas' dressing room, and see Pitt enter, to return the jewels stolen by Spike. They confront him, and he explains about the bet that led him to Molly's house, and his dubious man Mullins; he also unmasks Hargate as a card sharp. Spennie hides just in time as his uncle enters, catching Pitt with the jewels.

Pitt reveals the necklace is a fake, and Spennie uses the power of his uncle's secret to regain his independence. The young lord then tells McEachern of his daughter's affection for Pitt, just before the big ex-policeman is arrested by Blunt's detective, for being in league with Galer. Pitt helps him clear his name, and explains to McEachern the background to the similar mix-up that chilled relations between the two of them, offering Arthur Mifflin, now in London with a new play, as witness to the bet which started it all. McEachern is persuaded to come clean to his daughter.

Pitt and Molly marry, and Spike returns to America, disappointed that his idol turned down the gems – until he learns they were fake.

=== Commentary ===
The rewriting process shows complexities not easily explained. For example, the later version has new features more appropriate for, but not included in, the original version, e.g., Jimmy's habitual carrying of a flashlight suitable for burglary and detailed knowledge of white jargoon.

It also contains some apparent self-criticism of its own implausibilities, e.g., "a series of the most workmanlike miracles". These implausibilities, e.g., impostors as guests at a castle, mistaken identities which could be easily explained but are not, and unlikely encounters with old acquaintances, become common in Wodehouse's later works set in English castles, most notably Blandings Castle.

== Adaptations ==
=== Theatre ===
In 1911, Wodehouse and playwright John Stapleton collaborated in adapting A Gentleman of Leisure as a stage play. Starring Douglas Fairbanks and Ruth Shepley as Jimmy and Molly, the play opened on 24 August 1911 at New York's Playhouse Theatre. The play was revived at McVicker's Theatre in Chicago on 30 March 1913 under the title A Thief for a Night with John Barrymore and Alice Brady in the lead roles.

When the UK edition of A Gentleman of Leisure was reissued in March 1921, Wodehouse replaced an earlier dedication with one to Douglas Fairbanks "who many years ago played 'Jimmy' in the dramatised version of this novel".

=== Film ===
In 1915, the stage version of A Gentleman of Leisure became the first of Wodehouse's works to be made into a silent film. It starred Wallace Eddinger as Jimmy and Carol Holloway as Molly. Cecil B. DeMille was credited as the third scriptwriter, behind Stapleton and Wodehouse.

In 1923, the film was remade as A Gentleman of Leisure, directed by Joseph Henabery. It was adapted by Anthony Coldeway and Jack Cunningham. Jack Holt played Jimmy.

== Bibliography ==
- Davis, Lee (1993), Bolton and Wodehouse and Kern, New York: James H. Heineman, ISBN 0-87008-145-4
- Green, Benny (1981), P.G. Wodehouse: A Literary Biography, London: Pavilion Books, ISBN 0-907516-04-1
- Jasen, David A (1986), A Bibliography and Reader's Guide to the First Editions of P.G. Wodehouse (2nd ed.), London: Greenhill Books, ISBN 0-947898-18-2
- McIlvaine, Eileen; Louise S. Sherby and James H. Heineman (1990), P.G. Wodehouse: A Comprehensive Bibliography and Checklist, New York: James H. Heineman, ISBN 0-87008-125-X
- Taves, Brian (2006), P.G. Wodehouse and Hollywood, Jefferson, NC: McFarland Books, ISBN 0-7864-2288-2
