= E. J. Rath =

American novelist

- Born: 1885; Mount Vernon, New York, U.S.
- Died: January 28, 1922 (aged 36–37); Northwest, Washington, D.C., U.S.
- Other name: Edith Rathbone Jacobs Brainerd
- Occupation: Writer

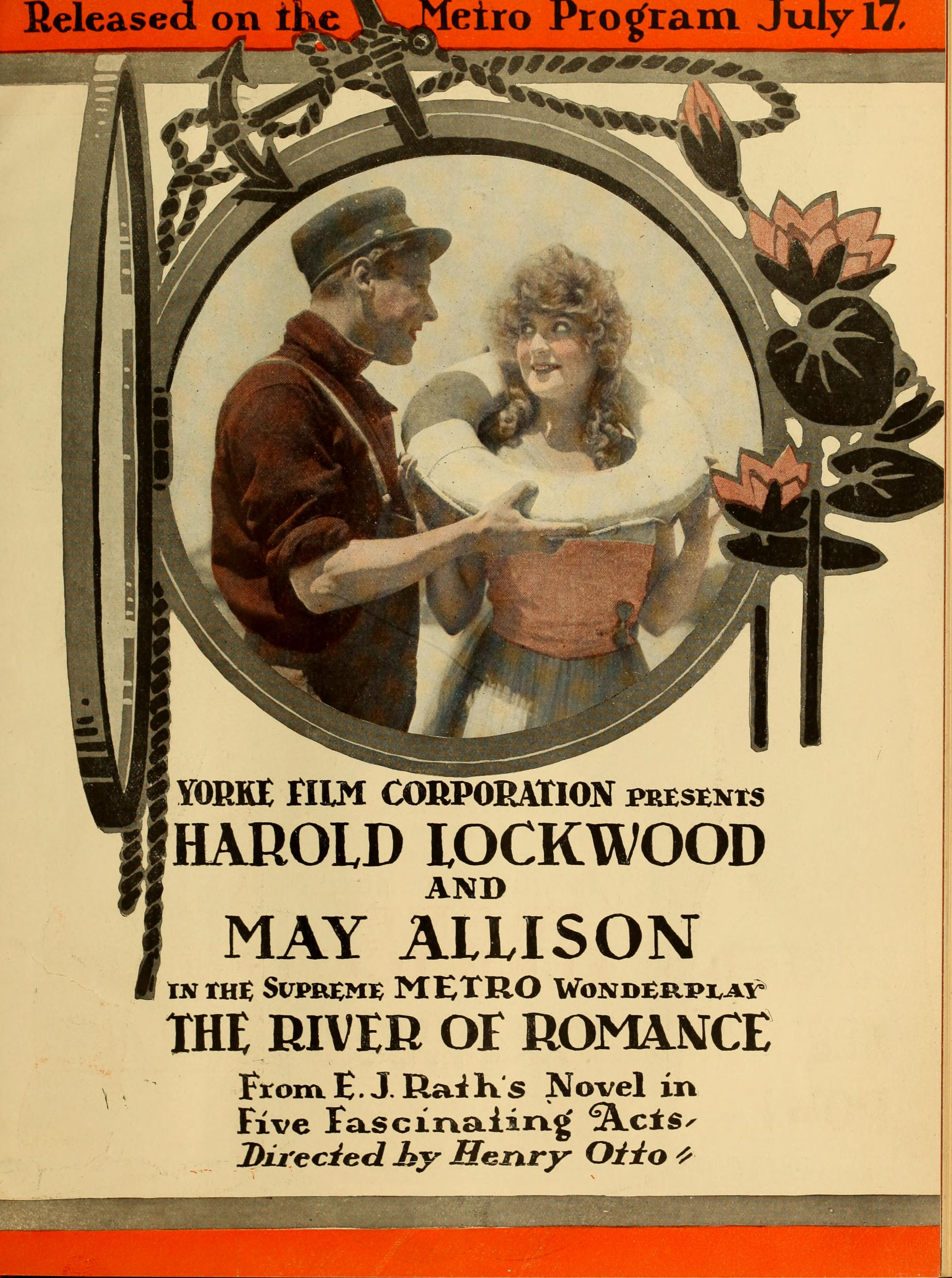
Advertisement for The River of Romance, noting it was an adaptation of the E. J. Rath novel Sam

E.J. Rath is the pseudonym of writer Edith Rathbone Jacobs Brainerd (1885 – January 28, 1922) who was assisted with many of her writing projects by her husband Chauncey Corey Brainerd (April 16, 1874 – January 28, 1922), a Washington D.C. correspondent for the Brooklyn Daily Eagle. Several of her stories were adapted into plays and films.

== Life and work ==
She was from Mount Vernon, New York.

Brainerd was her second husband. They married June 4, 1903.

The story "The Heroism of Mr. Peglow" was published in Everybody's Magazine in December 1907.

The couple were killed along with almost 100 others when the roof of the Knickerbocker Theatre in Washington D.C. collapsed under the weight of heavy snow. The event became known as the Knickerbocker Storm and occurred January 27–28, 1922. Politicians, officials, and fellow newspaper reporters paid tribute. He had attended the Peace Conference in Europe.

The Brooklyn Daily Eagle published a 36-page tribute.

Her book, The Nervous Wreck, was made into the movie The Nervous Wreck in 1926, starring Harrison Ford and Phyllis Haver.

== Works ==
- "The Heroism of Mr. Peglow." Busy Man's Magazine, 115–124 (1907)
- The Sixth Speed (1908)
- Too Much Efficiency (1917)
- Mister 44 (1916), adapted into the film Mister 44 (1916)
- Sam (1918), adapted into the film The River of Romance
- Too Many Crooks (1918), adapted into the film Too Many Crooks
- The Mantle of Silence (1920), illustrated by George W. Gage
- Good References (1920), adapted into the film Good References (1920) – also trans. as Goede getuigen (Dutch, 1934)?

Note: Rath was killed with her husband in Jan. 1922, but novels under the pseudonym continued to appear.

- The Dark Chapter: A Comedy of Class Distinctions (1924), adapted into the film Merrily We Live (1938)
- Gas Drive In: a high-powered comedy-romance that hits on every cylinder (1925)
- The Brains of the Family (1925)
- Elope if You Must (1926) – also trans. as Vlucht in den nacht (Dutch, 1941)?
- When the Devil Was Sick (1926)
- A Good Indian: A Northwoods Mixup (1927)
- The Brat (1927)
- Something for Nothing (1928)
- The Stolen Car (1929)
- Once Again (1929)
- The Riddle of the Wilds (1929)
- The Sky's the Limit (1929)
- Let's Go (1931)
- The Flying Courtship
- The Nervous Wreck (1931)

=== Translations ===
(not clear from the translated titles which English originals these are)

- Den stulna kompassen (Swedish, "The Stolen Compass," 1921)
- Mannen med nerverna (Swedish, "The Man with the Nerves," 1926)
- De innemende landloper (Dutch, "The Endearing Vagrant," 1927)
- Charlotte op glad ijs: een dol verhaal (Dutch, "Charlotte on Thin Ice: A crazy story," 1935)
- De man in het wagentje (Dutch, "The Man in the Cart," 1935)
- Het meisje uit de garage (Dutch, "The Girl from the Garage," 1935)
- De chef en de schooljongens (Dutch, "The Chef and the Schoolboys," 1935)
- Machtiger dan de sterren (Dutch, "Mightier than the Stars," 1941)
- Nu of nooit, trans. Diet Kramer (Dutch, "Now or Never," 19??)

=== Filmography ===
- Mister 44 (1916)
- The River of Romance (1916)
- Good References (1920)
- The Nervous Wreck (1926), an adaptation of her story of the same name
- Too Many Crooks (1927)
- Clear the Decks (1929)
- Whoopee! (1930)
- What a Man (1930)
- Fast Life (1932)
- Merrily We Live (1938), based on the 1924 novel The Dark Chapter: A Comedy of Class Distinctions by E.J. Rath and the 1926 Broadway adaptation They All Want Something
