= Roberta Wilson =

American actress (1896–1977)

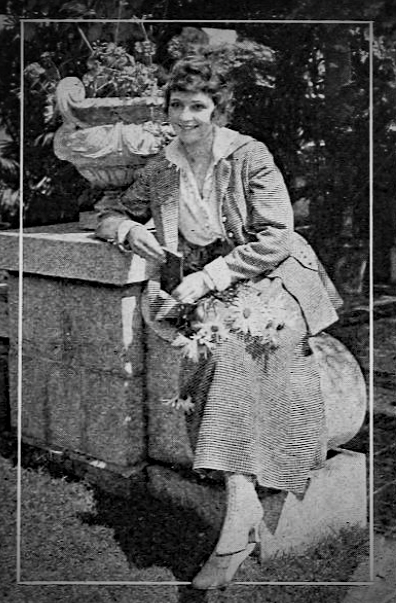
- Wilson in 1916
- Born: January 15, 1896; Pittsburgh, Pennsylvania, U.S.
- Died: April 20, 1977 (aged 81); Beverly Hills, California
- Resting place: Forest Lawn Memorial Park (Glendale)
- Other name: Diana Kane
- Occupation: Actress
- Years active: 1916–1927
- Known for: Actress; Hollywood Hostess; Charity work
- Spouses: Ray W Eyster (m. 1918; div. 1922); George Fitzmaurice (m. 1927; died 1940); MG Ralph P. Cousins (m. 1945; death 1964)
- Children: 3
- Relatives: Lois Wilson (sister)

Roberta Wilson (1896–1977) was an American actress who appeared in several silent films. She had three sisters, and all the young women would eventually act in films. Roberta and her older sister Lois Wilson were born in Pittsburgh, Pennsylvania, while her two youngest sisters were born in Chicago, Illinois. In 1907, when Roberta was 11, the entire household moved to Birmingham, Alabama. Roberta and Lois would always regard Alabama as their home. Lois Wilson, the oldest of the girls, would end up experiencing the longest career in films, including both silent and sound pictures.

In 1915, Roberta was coaxed into acting by her older sister. After making several uncredited appearances, her career blossomed in 1916. By the end of 1916, she was receiving top billing, and the movie colony glitterati affectionately called her "Bobby." Her star was rising, and 1916 would become the most productive year of her entire movie career. During this time, Roberta and Lois became known as the "Alabama beauties." Roberta completed 24 films between 1916 and 1918, most of them two-reel shorts. This first phase lasted until Roberta's marriage in 1918. She departed the silver screen at age 21 to concentrate on her marriage.

After the collapse of her first marriage, she reinvented herself as Diana Kane. She knew the name change was needed because her motion picture career always existed in the shadow of her famous sister Lois. Whenever the media listed Roberta Wilson or Diana Kane in print, the name was accompanied by parentheses and the phrase – sister of Lois Wilson. Roberta's film production in 1916 proved she did not need additional endorsements.

Between 1924 and 1927, she acted in eight feature films as Diana Kane. She received critical praise for all of her performances. Roberta Wilson worked in 31 movies between 1916 and 1927. This second stint of movie-making came to a close with her second marriage in 1927. She would never return to the silver screen again in a credited role. Instead, she was content to focus her energy on charity work, children, entertaining, and preserving successful marriages.

Roberta's age seemed to fluctuate depending on the source. Many actors of this period and successive eras believed they would extend their careers by remaining youthful. In Roberta's case, the media of the period reported her birth year to be between 1896 and 1905. A verifiable birth certificate could settle the controversy, but the whereabouts of Roberta Wilson's original birth certificate remains a mystery. (Note: 1900 United States census was the only point in time where the census enumerator asked for the actual "Date of Birth." The 1900 census registered a birthdate for Roberta Wilson as January 15, 1896. It also showed her birth location as Pittsburgh, Pennsylvania. Pennsylvania Birth Records are not public information. Pittsburgh birth records issued before 1906 are housed on microfilm in the Carnegie Library of Pittsburgh. An attempt to verify Roberta's birth date was made in September 2021. The Library found no birth records for either Lois Wilson or Roberta. A possible explanation was offered by the Library, "Our records are housed on microfilm, so there are multiple birth records on each copied page of the original ledger on the microfilm. We keep our birth records organized based solely on location in the county and year in which the infants were born. It was not uncommon for such an early birth not to be reported since it was the responsibility of a midwife or doctor to do so rather than the family. ")

== Early life 1896–1915 ==
When Roberta Wilson's father, Andrew Wilson (1869–1940), was 14 years old, his family emigrated from Ottawa, Canada to the United States. The Wilson Family settled in Pittsburgh, Pennsylvania. When Andrew was 23, he met 19-year-old Grace Stock. Grace was from an established family in nearby Franklin, Pennsylvania. Grace Stock married Andrew Wilson in Pittsburgh on September 7, 1893. (Note: Pennsylvania marriage records indicate Andrew K. Wilson, born in Canada on February 18, 1869, residing in 20th ward Pittsburgh, Pennsylvania, married Grace Loise Stock born in Franklin, Pennsylvania on January 27, 1873, living in Wilkinsburg, PA on September 7, 1893, in Allegheny, Pennsylvania. Neither had been married before this union. A second source from the Ascension Episcopal Church also verifies the 1893 marriage.)

They had their first child, Lois, on June 28, 1894. Their second daughter, Roberta, was born on January 15, 1896. When Roberta was born, Grace Wilson was experiencing the initial stages of Consumption. In 1897, she traveled to one of the sanatoriums in Los Angeles, California, for treatment. Southern California had become an epicenter for people having tuberculosis, chronic pneumonia, cirrhosis, and jaundice. People who flocked to these sanatoriums believed the sunshine and temperate climate would cure these conditions.

Grace Wilson was 24-years old when she died in Los Angeles on September 11, 1897. The cause was listed as "Tuberculosis of the lungs." When their biological mother dies, Lois is 3, and Roberta is 1 year, 7 months. Since Roberta was a toddler when her mother died, she would have no memory of her biological mother.

After Grace's death, Roberta's father moved to Chicago, Illinois. The reasons behind the move are unknown. The 1900 Census listed him as a mercantile reporter. While residing in Chicago, he met Constance Dooling, and they married on August 17, 1899. Andrew is 30 and Constance 23. Since Roberta was very young when her biological mother died, Constance would become Roberta's de facto mother for the rest of her life. This explains why Roberta (Diana) would always list her mother as Constance. While living in Chicago, Andrew and Constance have a daughter, Janice, born on October 28, 1900, and another daughter, Constance, on September 13, 1903.

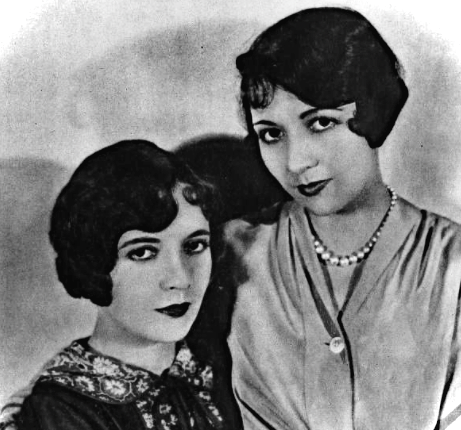
Lois and Diana 1926

In 1907, Andrew, Constance, and the four girls moved to Birmingham, Alabama. Andrew and Constance have a listing in the 1909 and 1910 Birmingham phone directories. The 1910 census reveals the entire family living in Birmingham, Alabama. The children are Lois, 15, Roberta, 14, Janis, 9, and Constance, 9. Some reporters have implied there was significance that the family moved to the "Pittsburgh of the South." There is no published evidence to support this.

In 1915, Roberta Wilson lived in Birmingham with her father and stepmother, Constance. She is 19 years old. One news article states, "when at finishing school she took part in all branches of athletics." That same year, Roberta's sister, Lois, moves to California after winning a beauty contest put on by Universal Studios and The Birmingham News. This beauty pageant was the predecessor to the Miss Alabama. Lois Wilson is the original Miss Alabama.

Roberta's sister, Lois, started making films in 1915. 21-year-old Lois Wilson's first movie was When a Queen Loved O'Rourke, a 2-reel short for Universal released in November 1915. (Note: In 1915, Universal released "The New Adventures of Terence O'Rourke," starring J. Warren Kerrigan. These films were shown in three installments. The first adventure was the 2-reel "The Palace of Dust," released on November 22, 1915. The second adventure was another 2-reeler, "When a Queen Loved O'Rourke," released on November 29. 1915. The last adventure was the 2-reel "The Road to Paradise," released on December 6, 1915. Lois Wilson appeared in the previous two installments. These were the first films of Lois Wilson's movie career. quoted from The Moving Picture World dated December 4, 1915) Lois becomes convinced her younger sister should follow her to Hollywood to seek fame and fortune. In 1915, 19-year-old Roberta Wilson heeded her sister's advice and settled in Hollywood. She accepted, playing minor parts until her experience secured more demanding roles. She gained an increasing reputation and respect among her colleagues for her excellent acting. 1916 would become her Golden Age in filmmaking.

== Films 1916–1918 ==
Excerpted from:
Motion Picture Studio Directory:
Section 2 ACTRESSES – Leads

WILSON, Roberta, leading woman, Universal; b. Birmingham, Alabama, June 10, 1897; screen career, since Nov. of last year, Universal (first as extra, within a month playing leads, has recently appeared in " The Other Half," . .

— 1916 October edition

The studio directory item on the right states Roberta Wilson started working for Universal in November 1915. Like most aspiring actors, she had to earn her acting chops in minor uncredited roles. There are no published listings of these early films.

1916 would prove to be a banner year for Roberta Wilson. It would mark the highest yearly film output of her entire acting career. Wilson would receive on-screen credit for 12 movies, including 3 features and 9 short films. She had gone from uncredited to shared top billing in a matter of months. She was skilled in her craft and worked hard at perfecting her performances. Her ascension to top billing was not based on the influence of her more famous sister but rather on her determination to achieve success in her chosen art form.

Wilson appeared in her first Universal movie with an onscreen credit – The Other Half. The 2-reel society drama was released on April 25, 1916, and produced by Universal. The magazine ads for the film list G. Raymond Nye and Roberta Wilson as the featured leads under the direction of Jacques Jaccard.

After her introduction as a female lead in The Other Half, her leading man, G. Raymond Nye, and director Jacques Jaccard would unite to make four more films: A Fight for Love, The Cage man, The Social Slave, The panel Game. They sprinkled these initial offerings with a short comedy, Art for Art's Sake, with Eddie Lyons and Roberta Wilson as the featured leads, released in July 1916. All of these short films were released between April and August 1916.

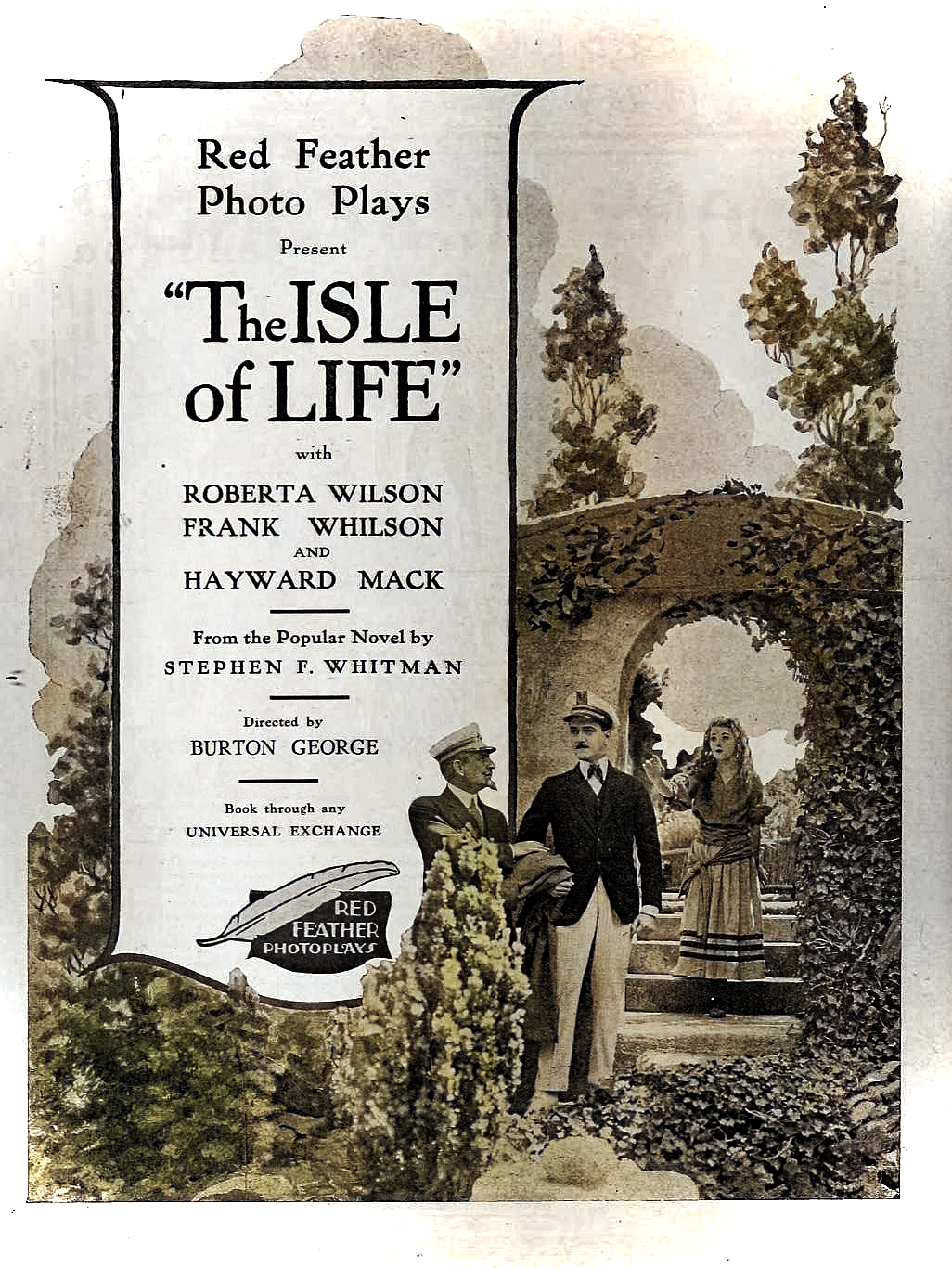
1916 magazine ad

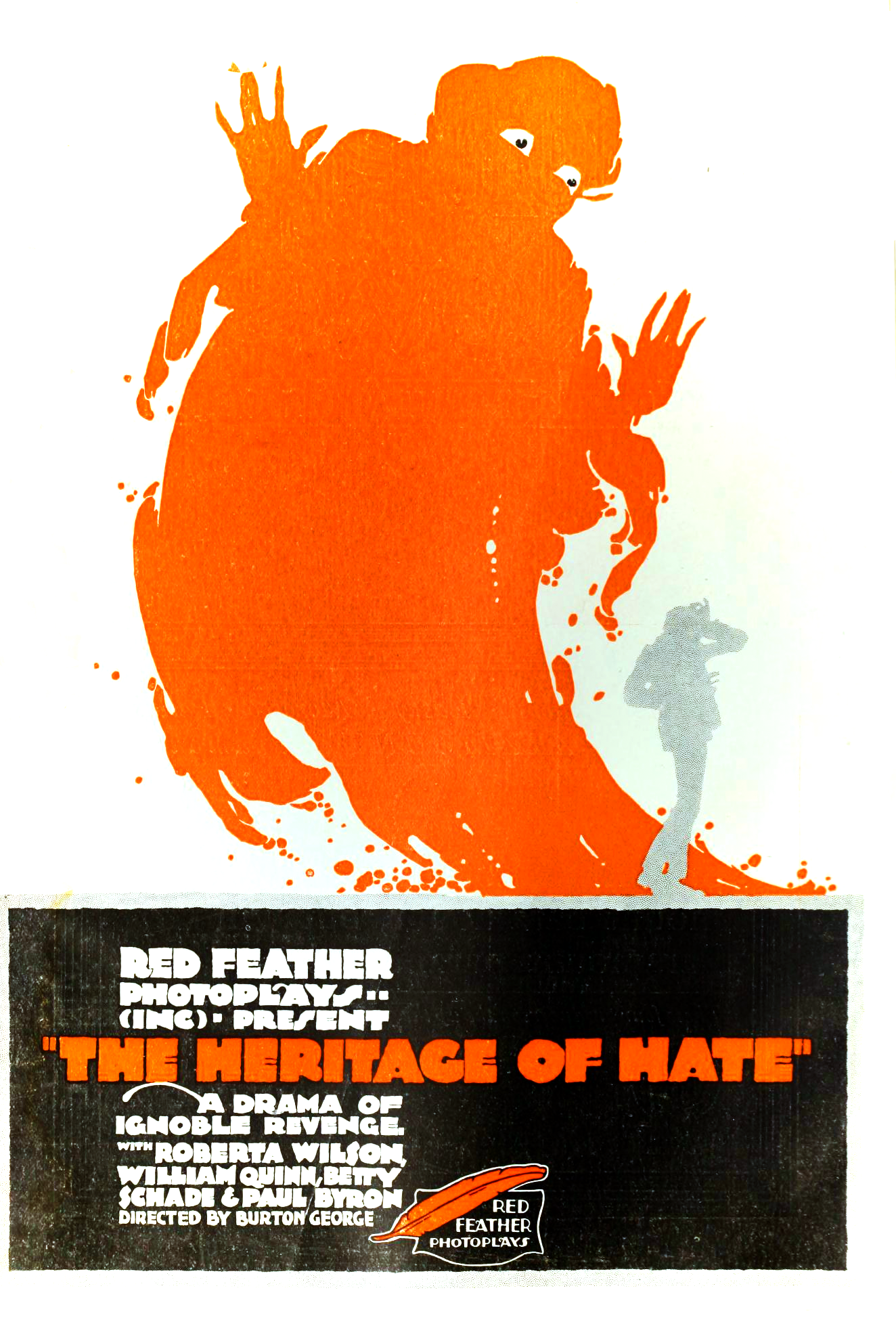
1916 magazine ad

Roberta Wilson's first feature-length film was the Universal Red Feature (Note: Based on an American Film Institute standard, films with a running time of forty-five minutes or longer are considered feature films. In 1915, feature films were becoming more the trend in Hollywood. "In 1916, Universal formed a three-tier branding system for their releases. Universal films decided to label their films according to the size of their budget and status. Universal did not own any theaters to market its feature films, unlike the top-tier studios. Universal gave theater owners and audiences a quick reference guide by branding their product. Branding would help theater owners judge films they were about to lease and help fans decide which movies they wanted to see. Universal released three different types of feature motion pictures: Red feather Photoplays – low-budget feature films; Bluebird Photoplays – mainstream feature release and more ambitious productions; Jewel – prestige motion pictures featuring high budgets using prominent actors) production of The Isle of Life. Filming started in August 1916, and the film was released on October 30, 1916. The film opened to mostly positives reviews. The movie ad from the October 1916 issue Moving Picture World, December 1916 edition shows Roberta sharing top billing with Frank Whitson and Hayward Mack under the direction of Burton George. Her rise to top billing was remarkably fast. Before shooting her next feature-length film, she released The Quitter on November 11.

Wilson's second feature-length film was the Universal Red Feather production of The Heritage of Hate. The film was released on November 13, 1916. Magazine articles stated that the film began as a Bluebird production but ultimately didn't meet Bluebird standards. The film was finally released as a Red Feather Photoplay.

Wilson filmed two more short films, The Emerald Pin and Mister Vampire, before releasing her final Feature-length film for 1916 – the Bluebird production of The Right to Be Happy. The Christmas production was appropriately released on December 25, 1916, even though that was not the planned release date. Roberta Wilson received credit on the film's poster. This film capped a successful first year for Roberta Wilson. All the magazine ads show Roberta Wilson standing as a top cast member on her own acting legs with no behind-the-scenes support from her sister, Lois, or friends in the industry.

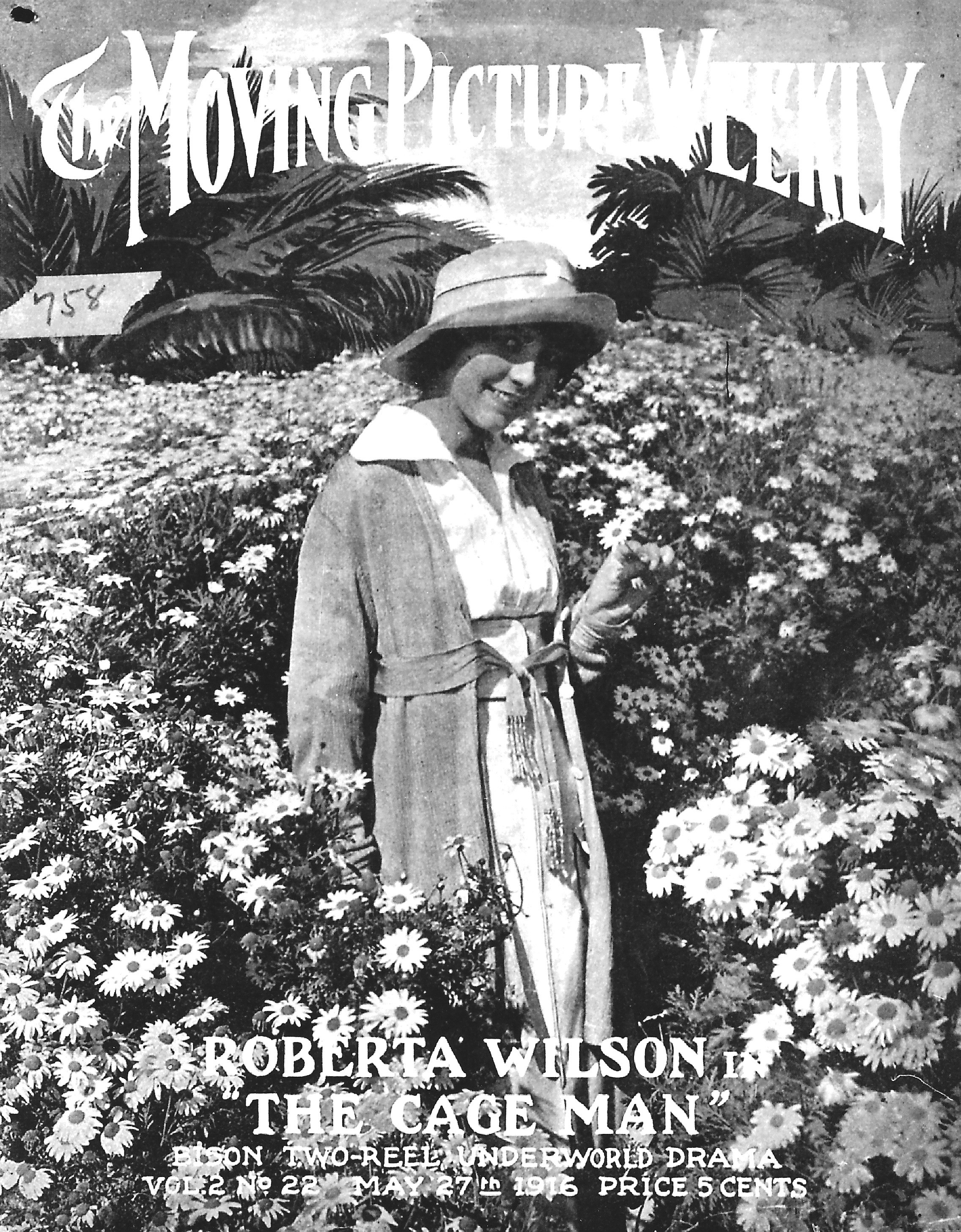
1916 MPW cover

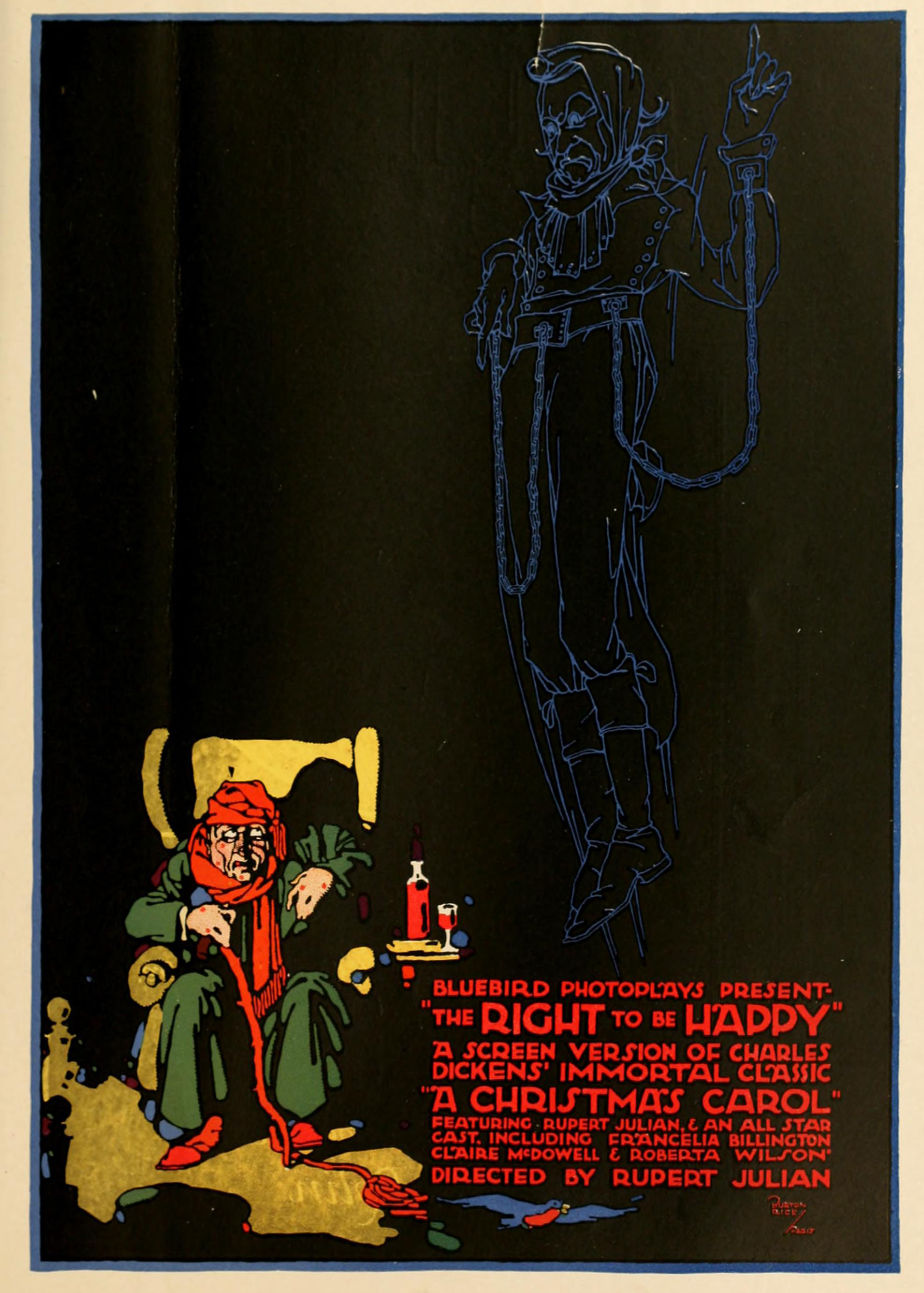
1916 magazine ad

In 1917, Roberta Wilson appeared in 8 films, including 1 feature and 7 shorts. March would prove to be her most productive month of the year. March 1917 saw the release of 6 films, starting with the Universal feature-length Comedy The Amazing Adventure followed by seven short films, including Good-for-Nothing Gallagher, The Girl Who Lost, Where Glory Waits and Is Money All?. Perils of the Secret Service – was a 9-episode series of two-reel adventure films. Wilson would act in 2 of the nine episodes – the fourth episode The Crimson Blade released March 30 and the fifth episode The Man in the Trunk released in April. Wilson's last film of 1917 was The Townsend Divorce Case.

In 1918, her film appearances continued to decline. Her last short film for Universal was Busted Hearts and Buttermilk, released in January 1918 by a Universal subsidiary Nestor Film Company. Roberta signed on with the movie company, Paralta Plays. She acted in two feature-length films, Shackled released in May and More Trouble. With the July 14, 1918 release of More Trouble, Roberta Wilson believed she had released her last film. Ironically, More Trouble was written by Ouida Bergere, the wife of famous director George Fitzmaurice. A decade later, Diana Kane would wed the divorced director.

Wilson had decided to give up Hollywood for marriage. Roberta could not shake her belief that she was living in the shadow of her famous older sister. Most magazine and newspaper articles refer to Roberta as Lois Wilson's sister. In September 1918, Roberta exchanged wedding vows and "severed her connection with the movie world." All of Roberta Wilson's films made during this period are lost except the 1916 release of The Isle Of Life

== Eyster marriage 1918–1923 ==
In May 1881, Raymond W Eyster was born in Amelia, Ohio. He moved to Chicago by 1900 and rose to become the proprietor of a hotel equipment company – the R.W. Eyster Linen Company. The company's success made him wealthy. Ray Eyster wed Bertha Koch in Chicago on December 24, 1906. They filed for divorce in October 1914, with Bertha citing cruelty. It is uncertain if Roberta knew the reasons for Eyster's earlier divorce, since those details might predict his future destructive behavior.

On September 14, 1918, Roberta Wilson, age 22, wed Ray E Eyster, age 37, in Chicago, IL. The age disparity barely violated the archaic "Half-your-age-plus-seven rule", so this marriage would not raise any collective societal eyebrows. This nuptial is Roberta Wilson's first marriage and marked her entrance into Chicago's society. The 1920 census shows Ray and Roberta Eyster living at 4949 Sheridan Road with a live-in German servant.

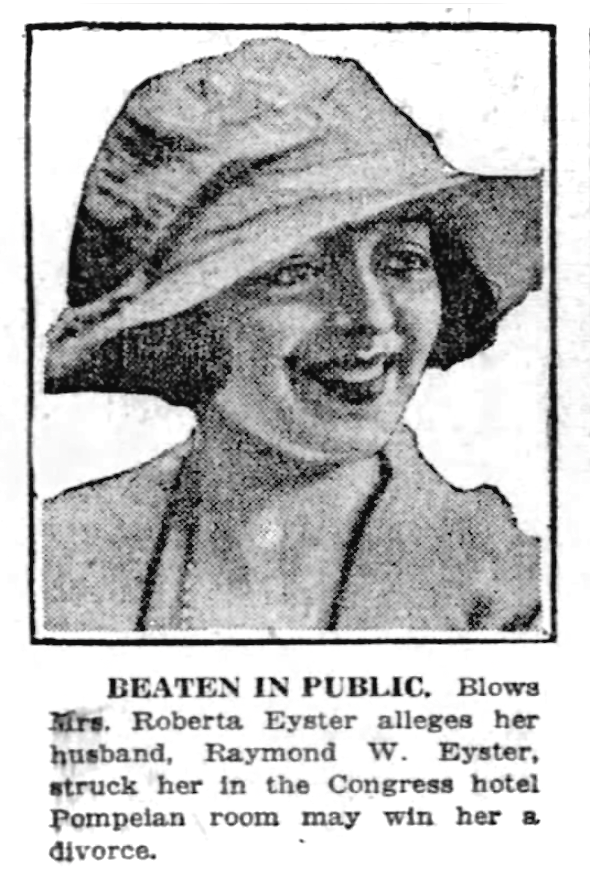
Roberta Eyster 1922

Newspaper snippets show a contented Roberta Eyster attending country club functions. Another newspaper photograph shows her sitting on a polo pony in a Chicago hotel. The news article stated Roberta Wilson got married and "severed her connection with the movie world." Indeed, she honored her promise to leave the movie business while married to Eyster, releasing her last film one month before her marriage.

The apparent facade of years of wedded bliss came crashing down in 1922. The Chicago Tribune printed a picture headlined – BEATEN IN PUBLIC. It further explained, "Blows Mrs. Roberta Eyster alleges her husband, Raymond W. Eyster, struck her in the Congress hotel Pompeian room may win her a divorce." It did lead to a divorce. Several circumstances contributed to their divorce, besides the blatant physical abuse. A check of Chicago newspapers plainly shows Eyster was not an attention-grabbing business owner. But his low-profile days ended when he married a Hollywood starlet scarcely out of her teens. After four years of marriage, they had no children, suggesting that Roberta had personal reasons for not embracing motherhood. This conclusion is supported, especially given the timing of children in her second marriage.

After his divorce, Eyster went on a year-long cruise around the world. He never remarried and remained devoted to his one daughter. When he was 71, he died of injuries sustained in an elevator accident.

After her marital divorcement and subsequent divorce, Roberta worked as a social director in Chicago's Blackstone Hotel. Her responsibilities included scheduling and overseeing debutante functions. The Blackstone attracted celebrities, prominent families, and politicians. The hotel earned the nickname of "The Hotel of Presidents." Her working days didn't last long; she had a rebirth as a different persona in another city.

== New York 1924–1927 ==
In Summer 1924, Lois Wilson was chosen to represent the motion-picture industry at the British Empire Exhibition. (Note: The British Empire Exhibition was held at Wembley Park, Wembley, England, from April 23, 1924, to October 31, 1925. The American motion picture industry arranged a cinematographic garden party. They wanted a personal appearance of an American star. "Because of her typical Americanism in Beauty, culture, and character, Lois Wilson, Paramount star, has been chosen to represent the motion picture industry of the United States at the British Empire Exposition." She would take a train from Hollywood to New York, then board a steamer for Europe. She would spend a couple of weeks abroad before returning to Hollywood to start her next picture.) Starting the first leg of her journey, she boarded a train in Hollywood and headed East to New York City. Along the way, she picked up her disgruntled and disillusioned sister, Roberta, who had quit her job at the Blackstone hotel. They traveled to New York City together. In July, while Lois set sail on the RMS Aquitania for Europe, Roberta moved in with her best friend Bebe Daniels and Bebe's mother, Phyllis Daniels. At Bebe's insistence, Roberta moved to New York and started a new life. According to the Hollywood media, Bebe treated Roberta like her "kid" sister. Roberta and Bebe would start living life as New York Flappers. Bebe also began working on resetting Roberta's life in an attempt to blot out the memories of a dismal past in Chicago.

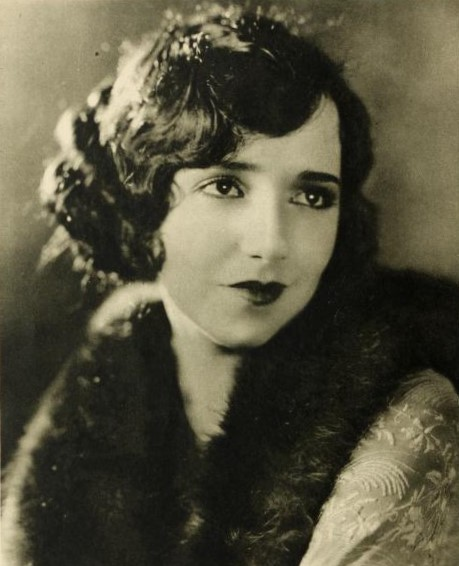
Bebe Daniels 1924

Bebe decided to create a new pseudonym for Roberta, "Diana Kane as part of the process." Roberta Wilson gave few public explanations for the name change; however, several published views on why Roberta changed her name.

1. Roberta served as a social director at the Blackstone Hotel. Chicago held a lot of bad memories, especially her public humiliation at the Congress Hotel restaurant. Moving to New York would bury the bad memories of Chicago. The press states, Roberta Wilson, changed her name to Diana Kane but never mentioned her experiences in Chicago as one of the contributing reasons for change. Also, during this transition, she changed her birthday from January 15, 1896, to January 10, 1901. Bebe's birthday was January 14, 1901. Changing your birth to the 20th century also helped secure film roles meant for young actresses.

2. In 1923, Bebe Daniels starred in Sam Wood's production of His Children's Children. The film was produced by Paramount Pictures, filmed in Astoria, New York, and released on November 4, 1923. (Note: Arthur Train was a Harvard educated lawyer and the former assistant district attorney in New York City. His experiences as a lawyer inspired the more than 250 short stories and novels he wrote during his lifetime. This Paramount film is based on Train's novel – His Children's Children. The novel traces the rise of the Kayne family and includes a character, Diana Kayne. Bebe convinced Roberta to change her name to Diana Kane. This is the explanation Bebe gave to the press explaining Roberta's name change.) The film depicts the rise of the Mayne family (Kayne family in the book). Bebe Daniels played one of the main characters, Diana Mayne (Diana Kayne in the book). Also, Robert Kane was a leading executive of the Famous Players–Lasky Studios at the time of the movie's release. Roberta's sister, Lois, had a long-time friendship with Kane, which might explain why she changed the spelling of Kayne to Kane.

3. Lastly, Roberta mentions her last name of Wilson, which is always associated with her more famous sister, Lois Wilson. Roberta believed the movie-going public would endlessly compare her acting to her older sister. In 1924, she stated, "I do not want to shine in reflected glory or to trade on my sister's reputation," says Miss Kane in explanation of her screen name. Roberta also suggested some movie fans told she got her parts in the films because of her sister. Checking the last three pictures she acted in 1918, Roberta Wilson was featured in supporting roles. Reading the reviews of these movies, none mention Lois Wilson, and the vast majority of reviews hardly mention Roberta's supporting roles.

Besides changing Roberta's name, Bebe was also trying to redefine Diana's roles. Bebe hoped to switch Diana from drama to comedic roles. Between 1924 and 1927, Diana Kane acted in 8 feature films, and 5 out of the eight projects were comedies.

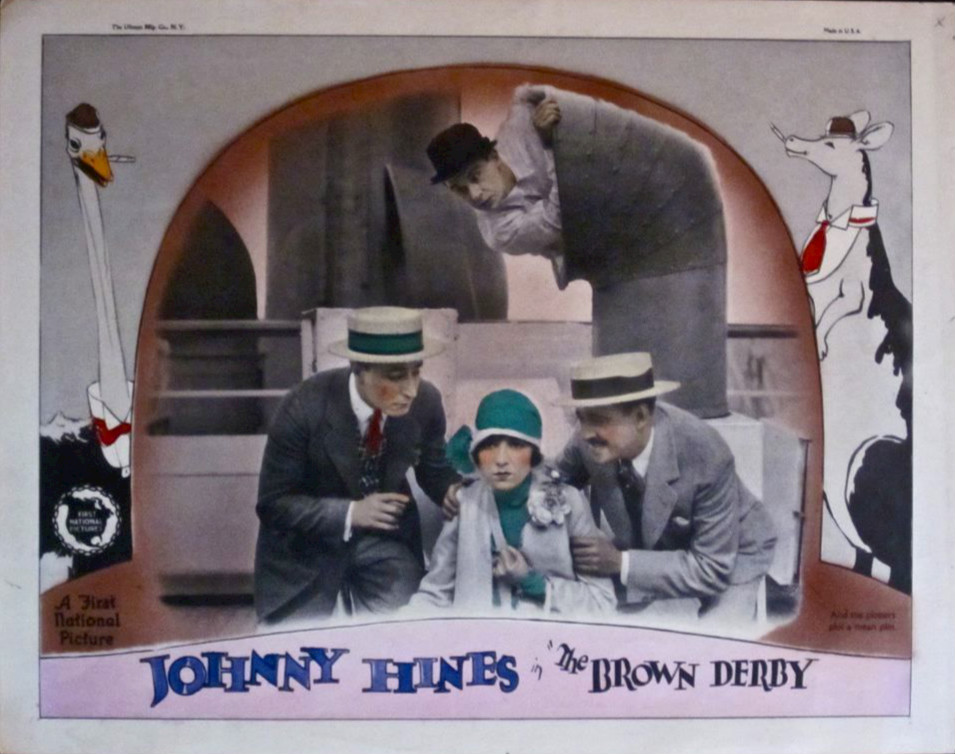
1926 Lobby Card

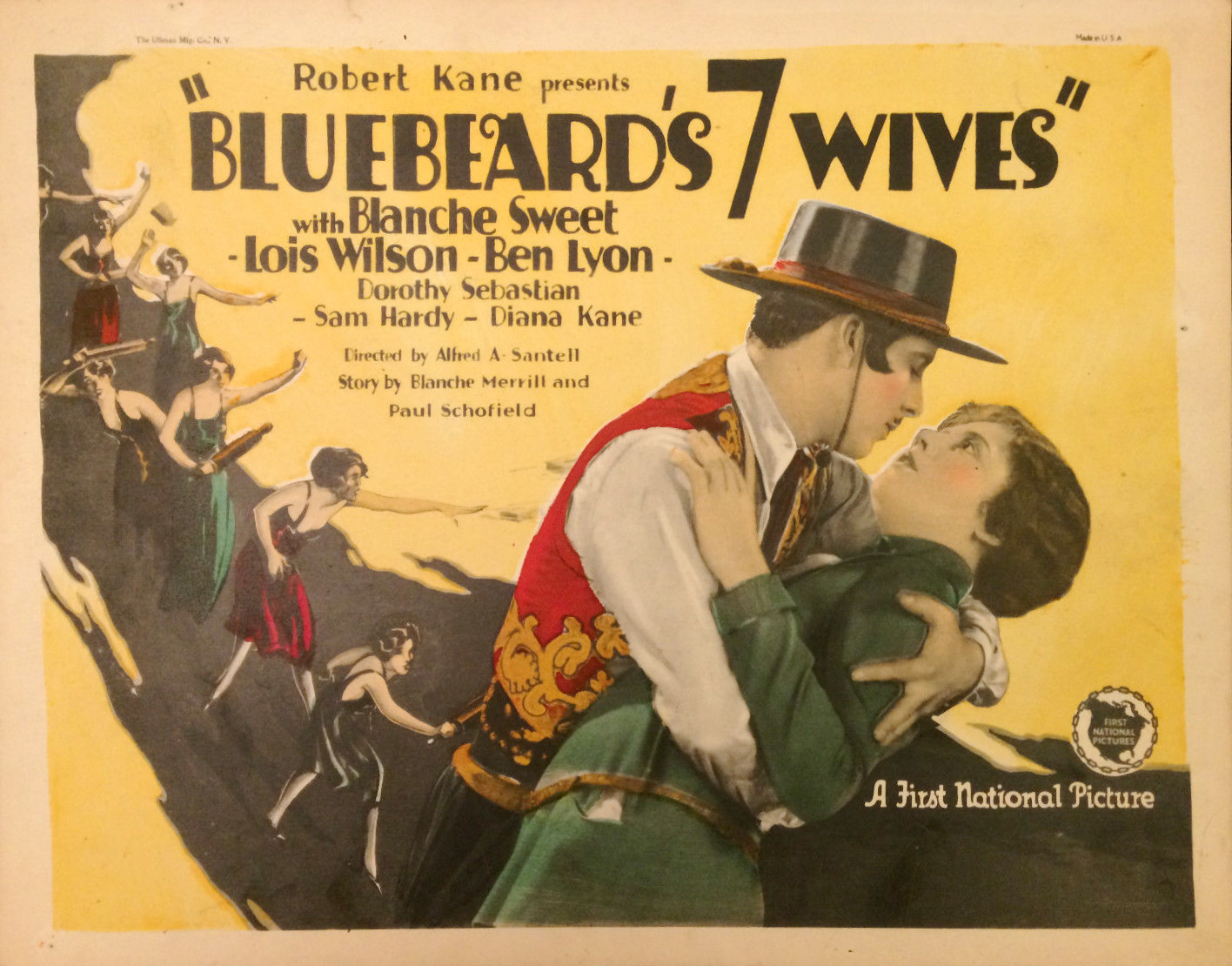
1926 Lobby Card

Her return to acting using her new cognomen was the Paramount release of Sinners in Heaven starring Bebe Daniels. The film was released in September 1924 and told the story of a man and a woman's romance while cast away on a desert island. (Note: " Sinners In Heaven" was a feature film released by Famous Players–Lasky Corp on September 8, 1924. The film was directed by Alan Crosland and featured Richard Dix and Bebe Daniels in leading roles. According to the May 22, 1924 issue of Film Daily – "Richard Dix, Bebe Daniels and the "Sinners in Heaven" company leave for the Bahamas this week to shoot tropical scenes." In June, the crew returned to shoot the rest of the film in Long Island, New York.) Her next film was another Bebe Daniels vehicle Dangerous Money released in October 1924.

Starting in 1925, she acted in the January release of Miss Bluebeard. This film was a comedy starring Bebe Daniels. The movie was filmed in Astoria, New York for Paramount Pictures. After a long pause, she acted in a Paramount comedy Lovers in Quarantine. The film was released in October and featured Bebe Daniels. Her last project for 1925 was a feature-length drama, The New Commandment released in November for another New York-based production company, First National Pictures. The film featured Blanche Sweet and Ben Lyon.

In January 1926, First National Pictures released Bluebeard's Seven Wives. The comedy project featured Ben Lyon, Blanche Sweet, and Diana's sister, Lois Wilson. Diana Kane's name is displayed on the lobby poster. Next was First National Pictures 's massive production of The Brown Derby, released in July 1926.

Diana Kane's last onscreen credited film was The Perfect Sap released in January 1927 and filmed at the Biograph Studios in The Bronx, New York City. This would be her farewell performance from making movies. She would marry for the second time in November 1927. All of Roberta Wilson's films made during this second stint are lost except, Miss Bluebeard Lovers in Quarantine and The Brown Derby.

== Fitzmaurice marriage 1927–1940 ==
George Fitzmaurice was a film director born in Paris, France, on February 13, 1885. He studied fine arts before moving to America. His background enabled him to work as a set designer for stage productions, eventually moving into picture design. In 1914, he made his first motion picture. His shows would become admired for their innovations and extravagant sets. He had a string of successful pictures, which made him wealthy.

His first marriage was to his chief scenario writer, Ouida Bergere, in September 1919. They divorced in 1924. After his divorce, Fitzmaurice became engaged to Florence Vidor, but she broke the engagement. Now a bon vivant, George Fitzmaurice was sitting in his new home when Diana Kane stopped in to ask for a part in a movie. The media claimed it was love at first sight for both.

As mentioned previously, after Roberta's marriage failed, she moved to New York and settled in with Bebe Daniels. In 1923, she changed her name to Diana Kane. While living in New York, she became involved with Fitzmaurice.

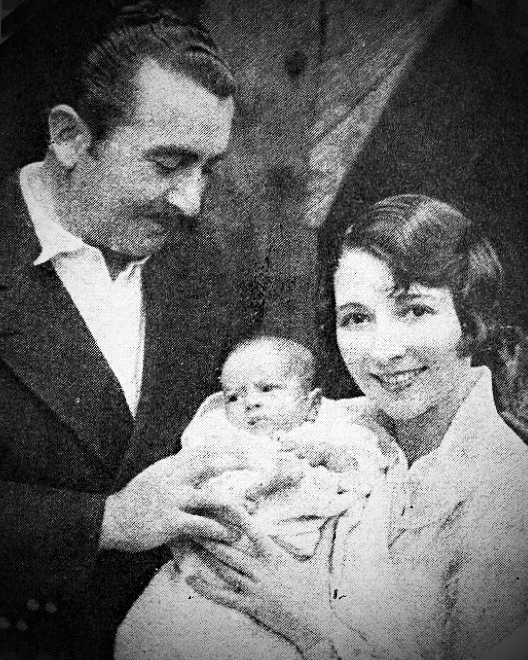
George and Diana

Diana Kane married George Fitzmaurice at 7:00 pm on Tuesday, November 1, 1927, in Santa Barbara, California. At the time of their marriage, she was 31, and he was 42. It was the second marriage for both bride and groom. The private ceremony was performed at the Hotel El Mirasol with only a handful of guests present. Diana's older sister, Lois Wilson, was a bridesmaid.

After George and Diana were married, they moved into George's new Tudor-style mansion in Beverly Hills. The home had been completed in 1926 for $300,000 (equivalent to $4,638,370 in 2020). The new home featured 10,000 Square Feet of living space.

George Fitzmaurice was interviewed by Anne Bye of Screenland Magazine for her column, "In New York," in 1928. She writes, ". . . there is just one thing I have against George Fitzmaurice, he is responsible for keeping Diana Kane, Mrs. Fitzmaurice, off the screen she hasn't made a picture in months, and it is all his fault I asked him why – "One of us had to retire," he said with the muse smile. "Two picture people in one family? But you may be sure she will always be my favorite actress." Diana Kane's experience as a social director would serve her well in becoming a prominent socialite and Hollywood hostess. Diana used her home to host weddings, showers, social functions, and, most importantly, a place to raise children.

According to the 1930 census, the house was a primary residence for George, Diana, 1-year-old daughter Sheila, an English Butler, a servant, a Child Nurse, and a 35-year-old French maid.

Diana Kane and George Fitzmaurice would have three children together during their marriage.

- Diana's firstborn daughter was Sheila Mary Fitzmaurice, born on March 10, 1929, in Los Angeles. Sheila's Godmother was Bebe Daniels. Sheila was 21 years old when she married 30 year old William Shay (1919–2000) in May 1950. They had six children together and remained married for 50 years. Sheila was the only surviving child to take care of her mother's estate when she died in 1977. Lois Wilson, her famous aunt, spent her final years with Sheila in Reno before dying in 1988. Bill Shay died in June 2000, and Sheila died in Reno, Nevada, on June 10, 2013. Sheila Shay was 93 years old when she died.
- After Sheila's birth, Diana had twins. Patricia Constance and Michael were born on June 2, 1931. Michael died a few weeks later on June 19. When Patricia was 20 years old she married 29 year old Leslie (Les) Thompson Baxter (1922–1996) in San Francisco on December 14, 1951. They had two children together. Patricia Baxter tragically died in February 1961 at the age of 31. Les Baxter never remarried and died in 1996.

George Fitzmaurice directed the picture Adventure in Diamonds. The film was released by Paramount Pictures on March 8, 1940, and would become the last movie he directed. He began work on his next picture but suffered from ill-health. He was hospitalized in the Beverly Hills Good Samaritan Hospital for a rare blood disorder. His health continued its downward spiral. While surrounded by Diana, Sheila, 11, Patricia, 8, and Diana's sister Lois, he died on June 13, 1940. He was 55 at the time of his death. Fitzmaurice had directed over 80 films in his 35-year. In 1960, he was given a star on the Hollywood walk of fame. George Fitzmaurice was interred at Forest Lawn Memorial Park.

== Cousins marriage 1945–1960 ==
Ralph Pittmann Cousins was born in Mexia, Texas on December 1, 1891. Cousins graduated from the West Point Military Academy and became a Cavalry officer under Jack Pershing. He also flew airplanes for the British in World War I. Brigadier General Cousins took charge of the Army Air Forces West Coast Training Center in 1942. He was promoted to Major General the same year. He helped "build the struggling US air arm into the colossus of World War II."

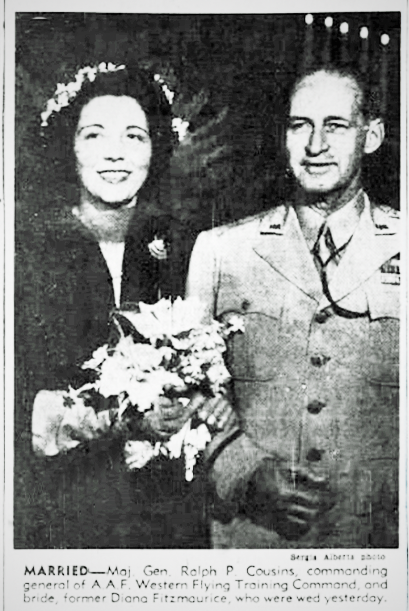
General and Diana Fitzmaurice

In an article by Hollywood gossip columnist Louella Parsons dated April 27, 1945, she states, "Mrs. Diana Fitzmaurice, widow, of one of Hollywood's most beloved directors, George Fitzmaurice announced today she would wed Maj. Gen. Ralph Cousins, commandant of the Santa Ana Army Air Base." Parsons further stated Diana is "one of the film colony's favorite personalities," and her future husband is "well-liked in Hollywood" and "made hosts of friends among southern California movie and society celebrities." Parson's comment explains how they met since they traveled in the same social circles.

Major General Ralph P Cousins (age 53) married Diana Fitzmaurice (age 49) in the base chapel on May 10, 1945. After honoring the couple on the base parade ground, they were treated to a small reception on base. It was his second marriage and her third. Diana had two daughters, Sheila, age 16, and Patricia, age 14. There was no honeymoon. After the ceremony, the general resumed his duties, and Diana hers. It should be noted – even though VE Day was celebrated on Tuesday, May 8, 1945, the war with Japan would continue until V.J. Day was celebrated on August 15, 1945. After the war, the general retired in 1946. He became active in several post-war projects. Diana kept up with her busy social calendar and volunteer work while raising two daughters.

Retired General Ralph died at his ranch on Sunday, March 15, 1964. The 68 year-old died of complications resulting from a heart attack. Diana was 68 years old at the time of his death. Cousins was interred at Forest Lawn Memorial Park.

== Death ==
Wilson died of heart failure on April 20, 1977, in Beverly Hills, California. (Note: Diana Fitzmaurice Cousin's death certificate is available for purchase from the Registrar-Recorder/CountyClerk, Birth, Death & Marriage Records, P.O. Box 489, Norwalk, California 90651 State of California Certification of Vital Record County of Los Angeles Registrar-Recorder/CountyClerk Certificate of Death 0190-01. . . Diana Fitzmaurice Cousins Died: April 20, 1977, 12:01 am Born in Alabama, January 10, 1901, 76 yrs old Father – Andrew Wilson, Massachusetts, Mother – Constance Dowling, Massachusetts occupation – Housewife for 50 years, resident – for 52 yrs Death Certificate signed April 21, 1977, death caused by cardiac arrest.) She was interred at Forest Lawn Memorial Park. Her grave marker reads:

DIANA FITZMAURICE COUSINS
Beloved Wife, Mother, Grandmother
1897–1977

Diana Fitzmaurice Cousins' obituary reads: Mother of Sheila Shay, Sister of Janice Stroub and Lois Wilson, six grandsons, two granddaughters, and one great-grandson. There is no mention of an acting career.

Her marker shows the birth year of 1897, but both the California death index and social security death index show the birth year of 1901. Even in death, they were still disputing her age and identity. On her death certificate, they list her occupation as – housewife.

=== Parents and siblings ===
Andrew Wilson, Roberta's father was 70 years old when he died in January 1940. Constance Barbara, Roberta's stepmother was 74 years old when she died in February 1950. Their successful daughters had moved them to California, providing them with a nice Beverly Hills home and a comfortable lifestyle for the rest of their lives. Lois Wilson remained devoted to her parents. She lived with them until they both passed.

In later life, Lois Wilson moved to Reno, Nevada to be closer to her niece Sheila Shay, Roberta's only surviving daughter. During her career, she appeared in over 150 films between 1915 and 1952. Lois never married. Lois Wilson died of pneumonia at a Skilled Care facility in Reno, Nevada, on March 3, 1988, at the age of 93 years old.

Janice Wilson began her brief career in films by acting in Pitfalls of a Big City released on April 13, 1919. 4 more movies would follow: The World Aflame, The White Circle, The Mask, and The Swamp released on October 30, 1921. The Swamp would be Janice Wilson's last film. Janice married James Bell (1900–1966) on December 5, 1921. They had one son, James Edgar Bell Jr (1922–1942). They later divorced, and Janice Bell married Harold Stroub (1896–1967) in December 1947. Janice Stroub, Roberta's younger sister, was 82 years old when she died on November 5, 1982, in Beverly Hills, California.

Constance B Wilson, Roberta's youngest sister, married George Lewis (1900–1951) on August 18, 1923, when she was 19 years old. Lewis was an ensign in the United States Navy. They had one son, George Lewis III (1924–2014). They later divorced, and Constance Lewis married Abraham Bayuk (1906–2005), the scion of Bayuk cigars in 1935. She had a short movie and television career but never left a mark in the industry. Constance B Wilson (Connie), Roberta's youngest sister, was 64 years old when she died on January 4, 1968, in Philadelphia, Pennsylvania, after choking on a piece of meat in a restaurant.

== Other age factors ==
Roberta Wilson (Diana Kane) had birth dates ranging from Jan 1896 to 1905. (Note: Roberta's sister, Lois, was not quite as deceptive about her age. Her age was public knowledge and correctly listed in her headstone in Forest Lawn Memorial Park. She also considered Constance B Wilson her birth mother.) Other birth sources are shown below:

- The 1900 Census would list the birth date as January 15, 1896.
- The 1910 Census is consistent with the 1900 census, citing Roberta's age as 14. Roberta's birth year is consistent with the 1900 Census.
- On November 12, 1958, Diana Fitzmaurice Cousins filed a Social Security Claim. The claim lists the name as Roberta Wilson, born on September 15, 1896. Further investigation would discover a second Social Security Number filing and a third Social Security number on her death certificate.
- In the Social Security Death filing issued in 1963, list Diana Cousins born on January 10, 1901. This would make her 76 at the time of her death. Genealogists commonly use this document as a source for determining her birth date.
- The most outrageous source used to determine her age was the newspaper articles displaying her third marriage in 1945. The headline read – "Gen. Cousins, Flight Training Chief, Weds" and further states, "Maj. Gen. Ralph Cousins, 53, commandant of the Western Flying Training Command, and Mrs. Diana Fitzmaurice, 40, widow of film director George Fitzmaurice." Using this article to determine age would assess her birth date as sometime in 1905, making her age 11 when she made her first movie in 1916.
- Searching for Wilson in the "Cook County, Illinois, U.S., Birth Certificates Index, 1871–1922" database shows: Constance Wilson was born on September 13, 1903, in Oak Park, Illinois. There were no other Wilson discoveries.
- Diana Fitzmaurice Cousins death certificate displays wrong SSN, mother, birthplace, and birth date.

== Filmography ==
This listing does not include every film Roberta Wilson appeared in. Only one film with an offscreen credit film is listed, while the rest are lost to time.

◆ Filmography of Roberta Wilson ◆
| Year | Film | Production | Distribution | Genre | Length | Credit | Released |
|---|---|---|---|---|---|---|---|
| 1939 | Winter Carnival | Walter Wanger Prod | First National | Drama | Drama | Roberta Wilson | 1939-07-28 (Note: This film is listed on the AFI catalog website. Winter Carnival was a 1939 feature starring Ann Sheridan and Richard Carlson. Roberta Wilson is listed as an offscreen credit with the caveat of "This credit did not appear onscreen and was derived from contemporary sources.") |
| 1927 | The Perfect Sap | First National | First National | Comedy | Feature | Diana Kane | 1927-01-23 |
| 1926 | The Brown Derby | First National | First National | Comedy | Feature | Diana Kane | 1926-07-04 |
| 1926 | Bluebeard's Seven Wives | First National | First National | Comedy | Feature | Diana Kane | 1926-01-13 |
| 1925 | The New Commandment | First National | First National | Drama | Feature | Diana Kane | 1925-11-01 |
| 1925 | Lovers in Quarantine | Paramount | Paramount | Comedy | Feature | Diana Kane | 1925-10-11 |
| 1925 | Miss Bluebeard | Paramount | Paramount | Comedy | Feature | Diana Kane | 1925-01-26 |
| 1924 | Dangerous Money | Famous Players | Paramount | Drama | Feature | Diana Kane | 1924-10-20 |
| 1924 | Sinners in Heaven | Famous Players | Paramount | Drama | Feature | Diana Kane | 1924-09-08 |
| 1918 | More Trouble | Anderson-Brunton | Pathé | Comedy | Feature | Roberta Wilson | 1918-07-14 |
| 1918 | Shackled | Paralta Plays | Hodkinson | Drama | Feature | Roberta Wilson | 1918-05-20 |
| 1918 | Busted Hearts and Buttermilk | Nestor Film | Universal | Comedy | Short | Roberta Wilson | 1918-01-12 |
| 1917 | The Townsend Divorce Case | Independent Pictures | Universal | Drama | Short | Roberta Wilson | 1917-04-26 |
| 1917 | The Man in the Trunk | Independent Pictures | Universal | Drama | Short | Roberta Wilson | 1917-04-06 |
| 1917 | The Crimson Blade | Independent Pictures | Universal | Drama | Short | Roberta Wilson | 1917-03-30 |
| 1917 | Is Money All? | Universal | Universal | Drama | Short | Roberta Wilson | 1917-03-28 |
| 1917 | Where Glory Waits | Universal | Universal | Drama | Short | Roberta Wilson | 1917-03-14 |
| 1917 | The Girl Who Lost | Universal | Universal | Drama | Short | Roberta Wilson | 1917-03-12 |
| 1917 | Good-for-Nothing Gallagher | Universal | Universal | Comedy | Short | Roberta Wilson | 1917-03-08 |
| 1917 | The Amazing Adventure | Independent Pictures | Universal | Comedy | Feature | Roberta Wilson | 1917-03-08 |
| 1916 | The Right to Be Happy | Universal | Universal | Drama | Feature | Roberta Wilson | 1916-12-25 |
| 1916 | Mister Vampire | Independent Pictures | Universal | Drama | Short | Roberta Wilson | 1916-12-24 |
| 1916 | The Emerald Pin | Universal | Universal | Drama | Short | Roberta Wilson | 1916-11-23 |
| 1916 | The Heritage of Hate | Independent Pictures | Universal | Drama | Feature | Roberta Wilson | 1916-11-13 |
| 1916 | The Quitter | Bison Motion Pictures | Universal | Drama | Short | Roberta Wilson | 1916-11-11 |
| 1916 | The Isle of Life | Universal | Universal | Drama | Feature | Roberta Wilson | 1916-10-30 |
| 1916 | The Panel Game | Independent Pictures | Universal | Drama | Short | Roberta Wilson | 1916-08-25 |
| 1916 | Art for Art's Sake | Nestor Film | Universal | Comedy | Short | Roberta Wilson | 1916-07-24 |
| 1916 | The Social Slave | Universal | Universal | Drama | Short | Roberta Wilson | 1916-07-22 |
| 1916 | The Cage Man | Bison Motion Pictures | Universal | Drama | Short | Roberta Wilson | 1916-06-10 |
| 1916 | A Fight for Love | Bison Motion Pictures | Universal | Drama | Short | Roberta Wilson | 1916-05-13 |
| 1916 | The Other Half | Universal | Universal | Drama | Short | Roberta Wilson | 1916-04-25 |

== Gallery ==
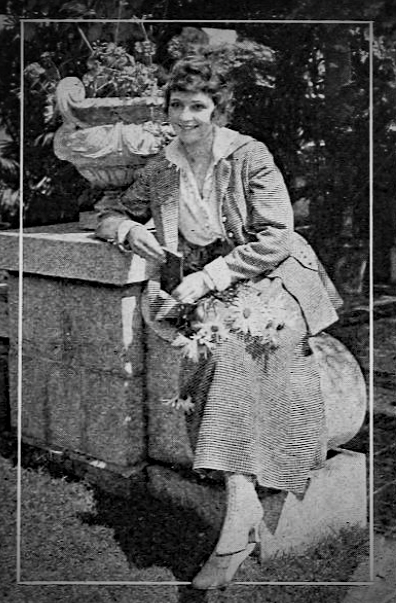
Roberta Wilson
1916

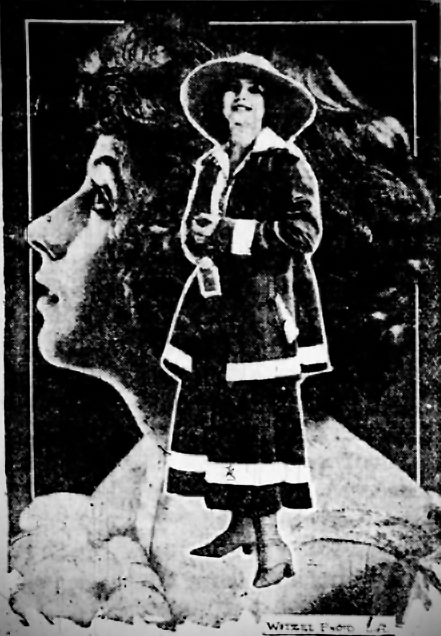
Roberta Wilson
1916

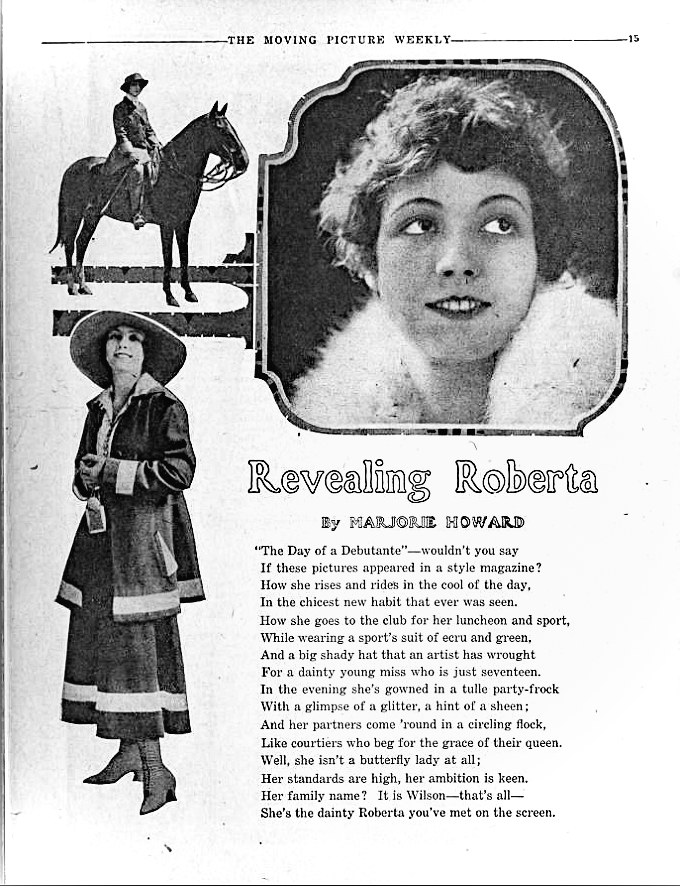
Roberta Wilson
1917

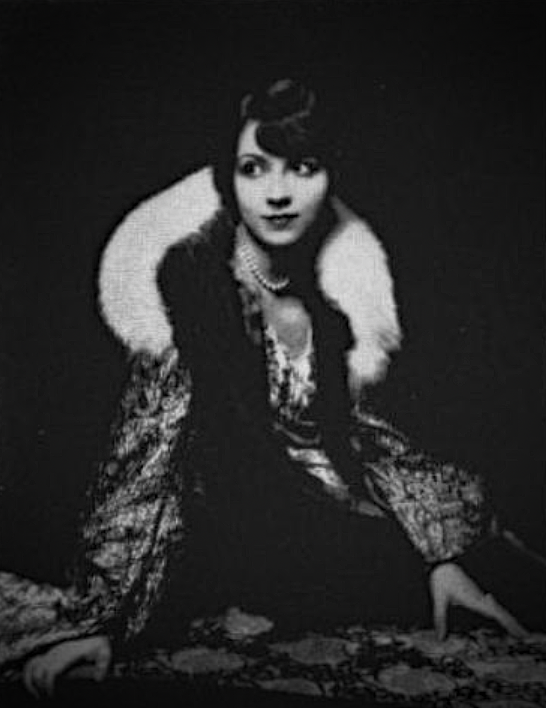
Diana Kane
1925

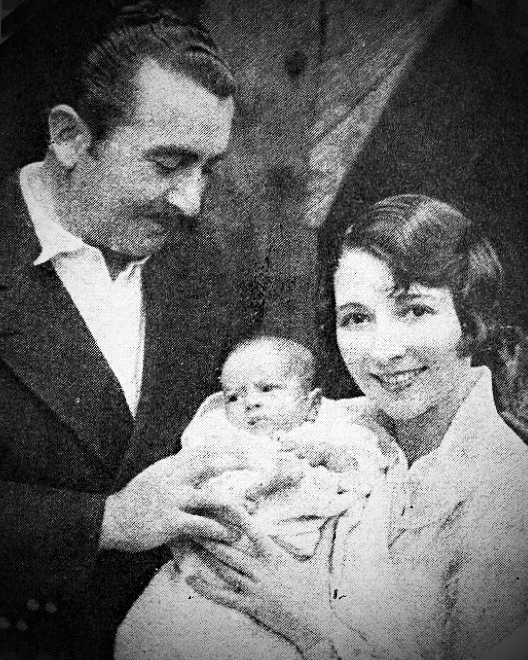
George Fitzmaurice and
Diana Fitzmaurice 1929

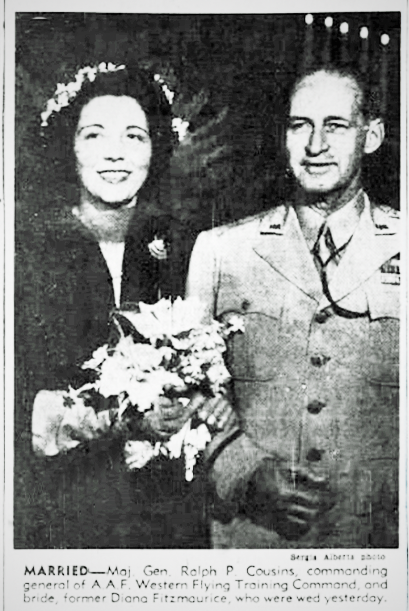
Diana Fitzmaurice_and_
Ralph P. Cousins 1945

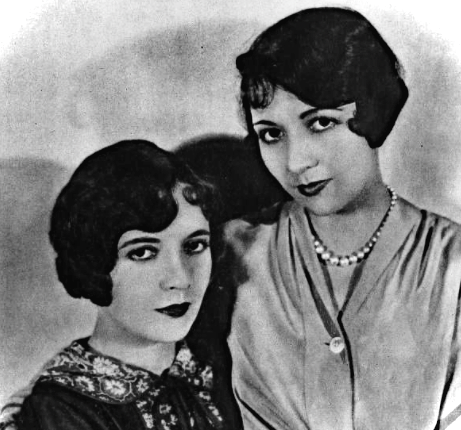
Lois Wilson and
Diana Kane 1926

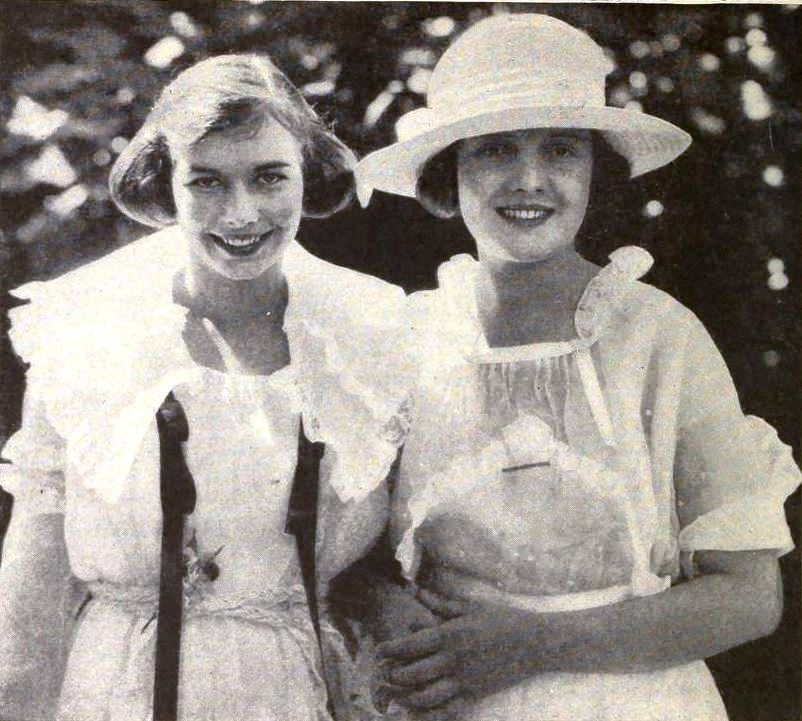
Constance Wilson and
Lois Wilson 1921

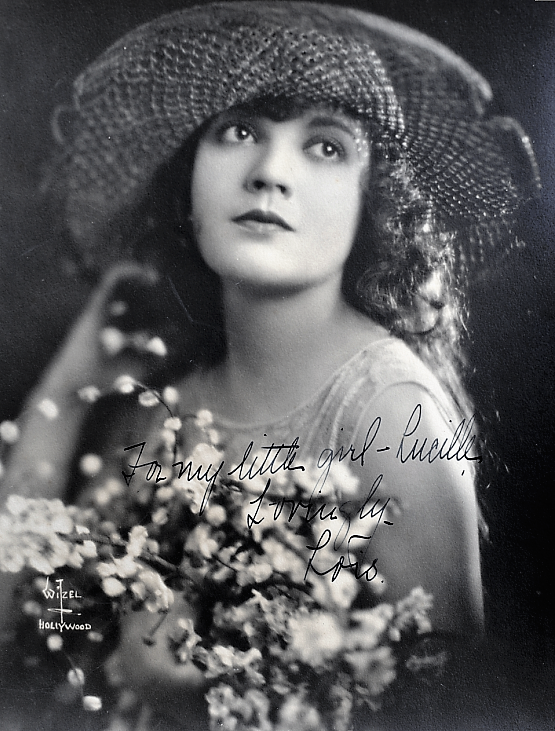
Lois Wilson
1924

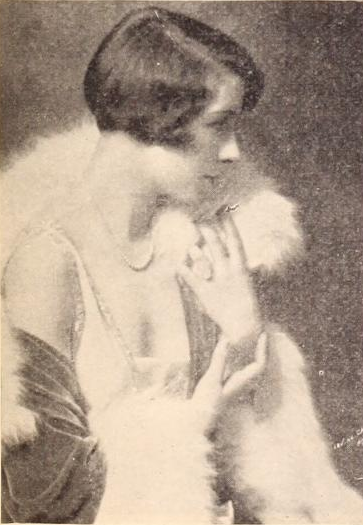
Roberta Wilson
1927

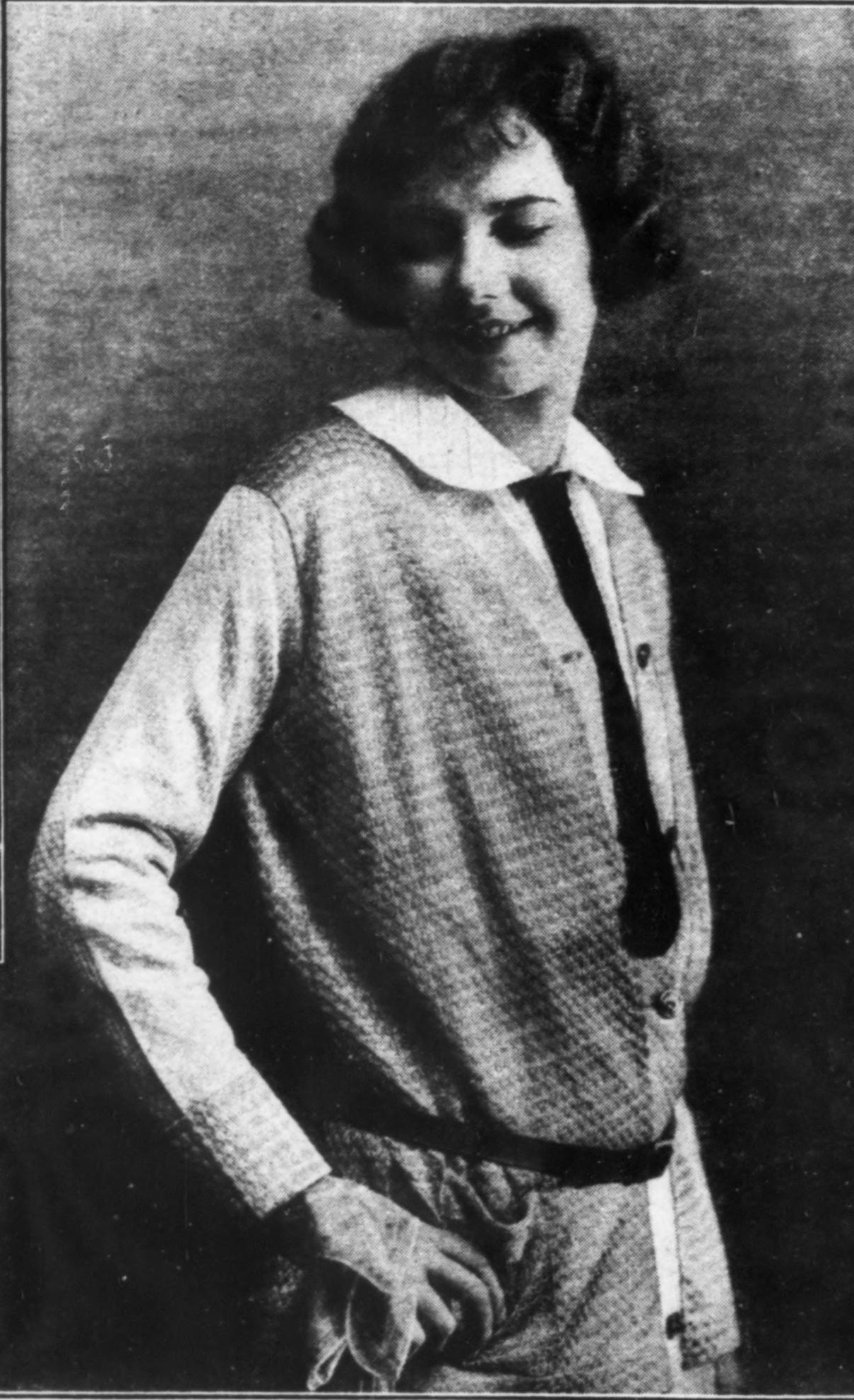
Constance Wilson
1923

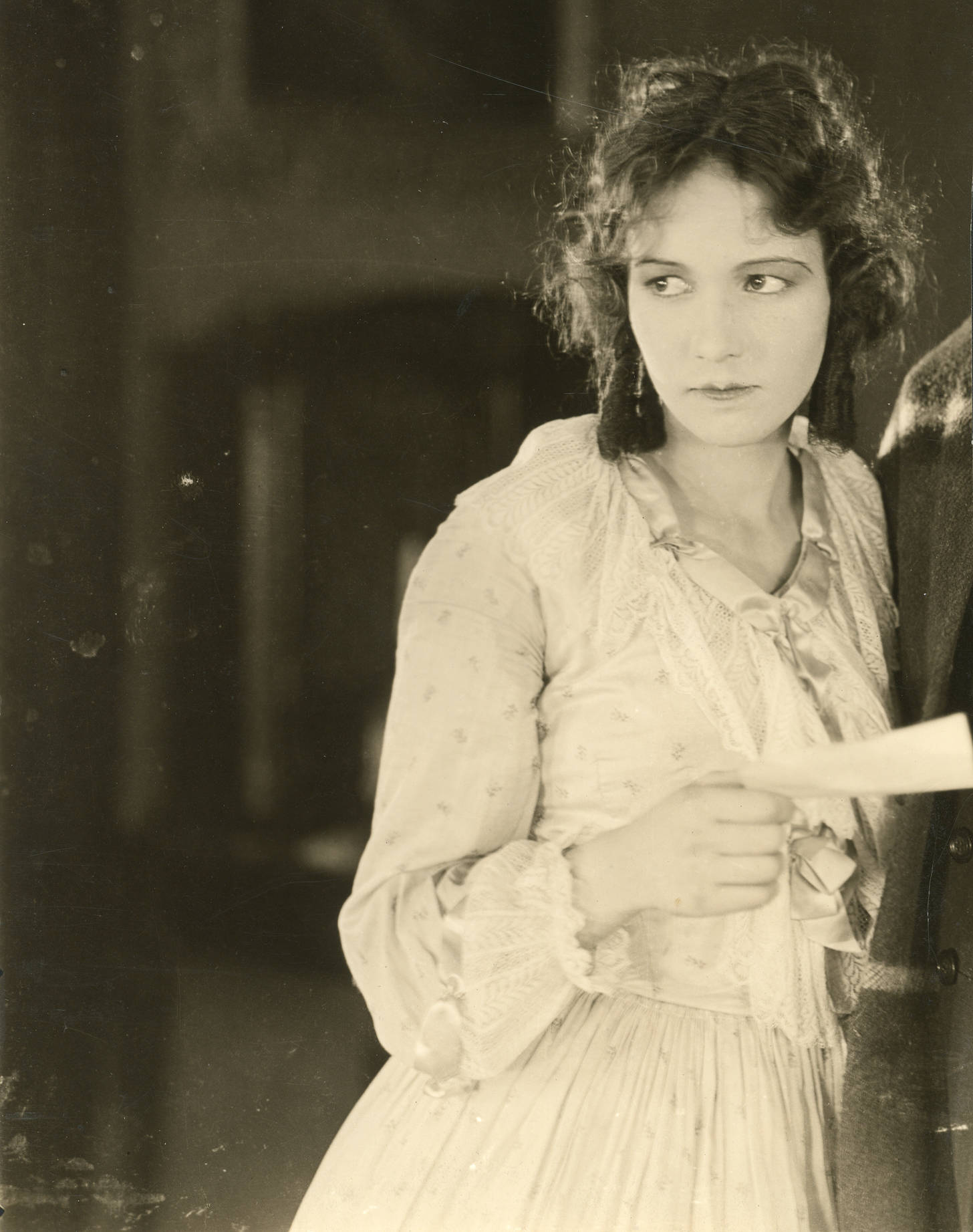
Janice Wilson
1924
