= Shackled (1918 film) =

1918 silent film

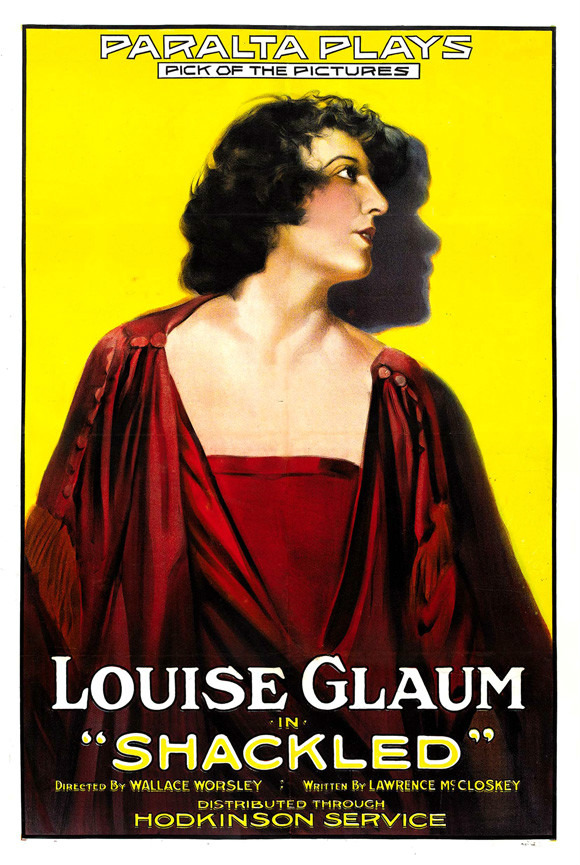
- Directed by: Reginald Barker
- Written by: J. Grubb Alexander; Lawrence McCloskey; Fred Myton
- Starring: Louise Glaum; Charles West; John Gilbert
- Cinematography: L. Guy Wilky
- Production company: Paralta Plays
- Distributed by: Hodkinson Pictures
- Release date: May 20, 1918
- Running time: 60 minutes
- Country: United States
- Languages: Silent; English intertitles

Shackled is a 1918 American silent drama film directed by Reginald Barker and starring Louise Glaum, Charles West and John Gilbert.

== Cast ==
- Louise Glaum as Lola Dexter
- Charles West as Walter Cosgrove
- John Gilbert as James Ashley
- Roberta Wilson as Edith Danfield
- Lawson Butt as Thomas Danfield
- Herschel Mayall as Henry Hartman
- Roy Laidlaw as Major Duval

== Preservation ==
With no prints of Shackled located in any film archives, it is considered a lost film.

== Bibliography ==
- B. Connelly, Robert. The Silents: Silent Feature Films, 1910-36, Volume 40, Issue 2. December Press, 1998.
