= Dangerous Money (1924 film) =

1924 film by Frank Tuttle

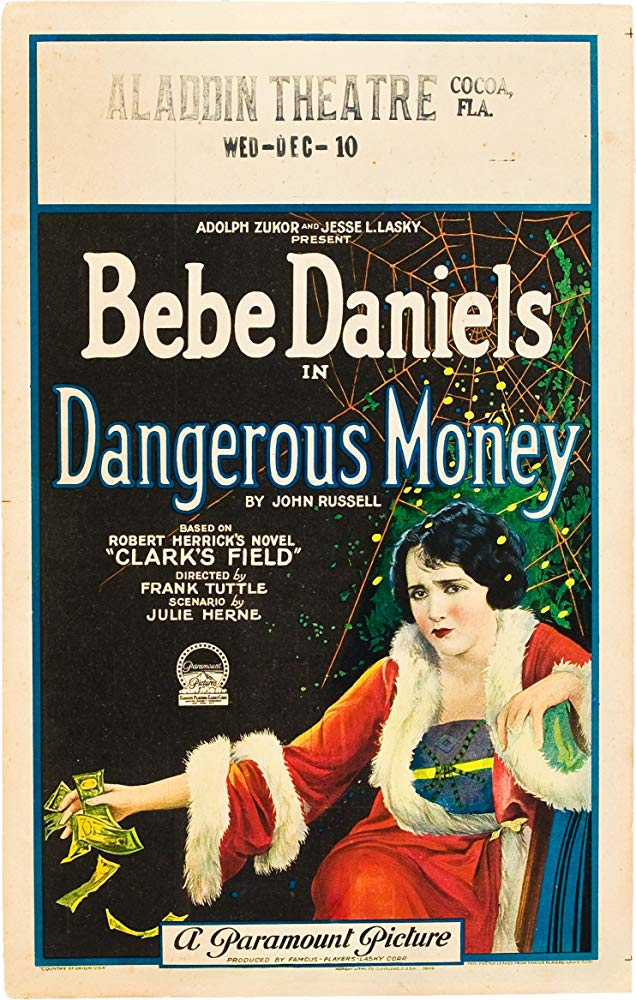
- Poster
- Directed by: Frank Tuttle
- Written by: John Russell (adaptation); Julie Herne (scenario)
- Based on: Clark's Field; 1914 novel by Robert Herrick
- Produced by: Adolph Zukor; Jesse Lasky
- Starring: Bebe Daniels; Tom Moore
- Cinematography: J. Roy Hunt
- Distributed by: Paramount Pictures
- Release date: October 13, 1924
- Running time: 60 minutes
- Country: United States
- Language: Silent (English intertitles)

Dangerous Money is a 1924 American silent drama film produced by Famous Players–Lasky and distributed by Paramount Pictures. It was directed by Frank Tuttle and starred popular Bebe Daniels.

== Plot summary ==
Boardinghouse servant Adele Clark is unexpectedly awarded the ownership of a piece of New York City property known as Clark's Field. The trustees send her to a finishing school, whose headmistress, Signorina Vitale, persuades Adele and her sweetheart, Tim Sullivan, that she should travel to Europe. Adele's new riches cause her to lose her sense of proportion, and she soon is involved with a fast set indulging in the jazz life. Even Tim cannot curb Adele's extravagance, and he returns to America while Adele marries Italian fortune-hunter Prince Arnolfo Da Pescia. When a will is discovered naming Tim as the rightful heir to Clark's Field, Adele and Arnolfo hurry to New York, and Arnolfo tries to steal the choice, then dies in a hotel fire. All dispute over the land is ended when Tim and Adele are united.

== Cast ==
- Bebe Daniels as Adele Clark
- Tom Moore as Tim Sullivan
- William Powell as Prince Arnolfo da Pescia
- Dolores Cassinelli as Signoria Vitale
- Mary Foy as "Auntie" Clark
- Edward O'Connor as Sheamus Sullivan
- Peter Lang as Judge Daniel Orcutt
- Charles Slattery as O'Hara
- Diana Kane

== Preservation ==
With no copies of Dangerous Money located in any film archives, it is a lost film.
