= Andrew Mack (actor) =

American vaudevillian, actor, singer and songwriter

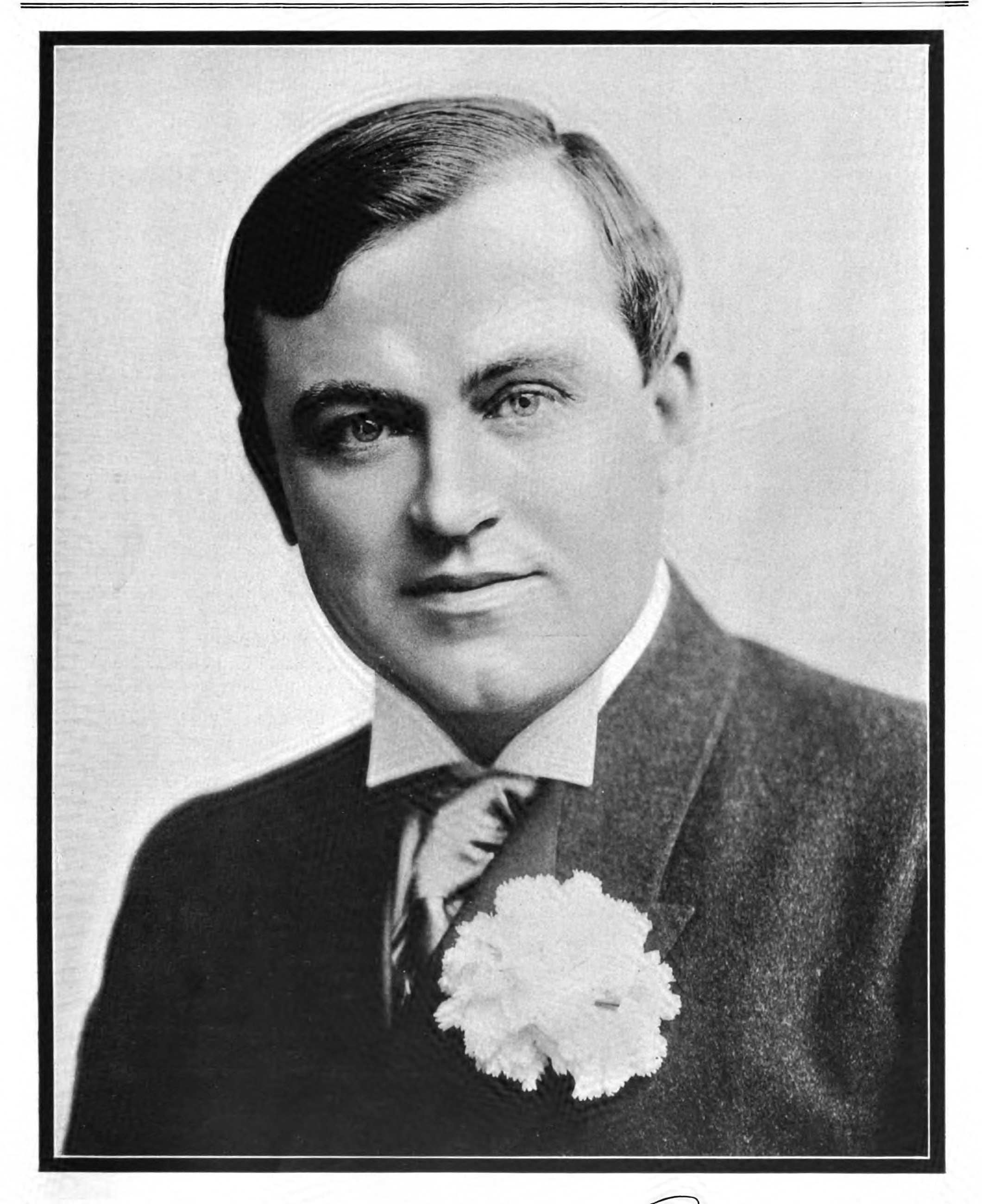
Andrew Mack

Andrew Mack, born William Andrew McAloon, (July 25, 1863 – May 21, 1931) was an American vaudevillian, actor, singer and songwriter of Irish descent.

== Biography ==
A native of Boston, Massachusetts, he began his career at an early age in 1876 using the stage name Andrew Williams. He began in minstrel shows, and was especially associated with the song "A Violet From Mother's Grave". In 1892, he debuted in vaudeville.

He composed songs for himself to sing. In 1899, he composed the popular song "The Story of the Rose (Heart of My Heart)" which became a standard of barbershop quartets.

== Partial filmography ==
- Bluebeard's Seven Wives (1926)

== See also ==
- Heart of My Heart
