= The Snow Bride =

1923 film by Henry Kolker

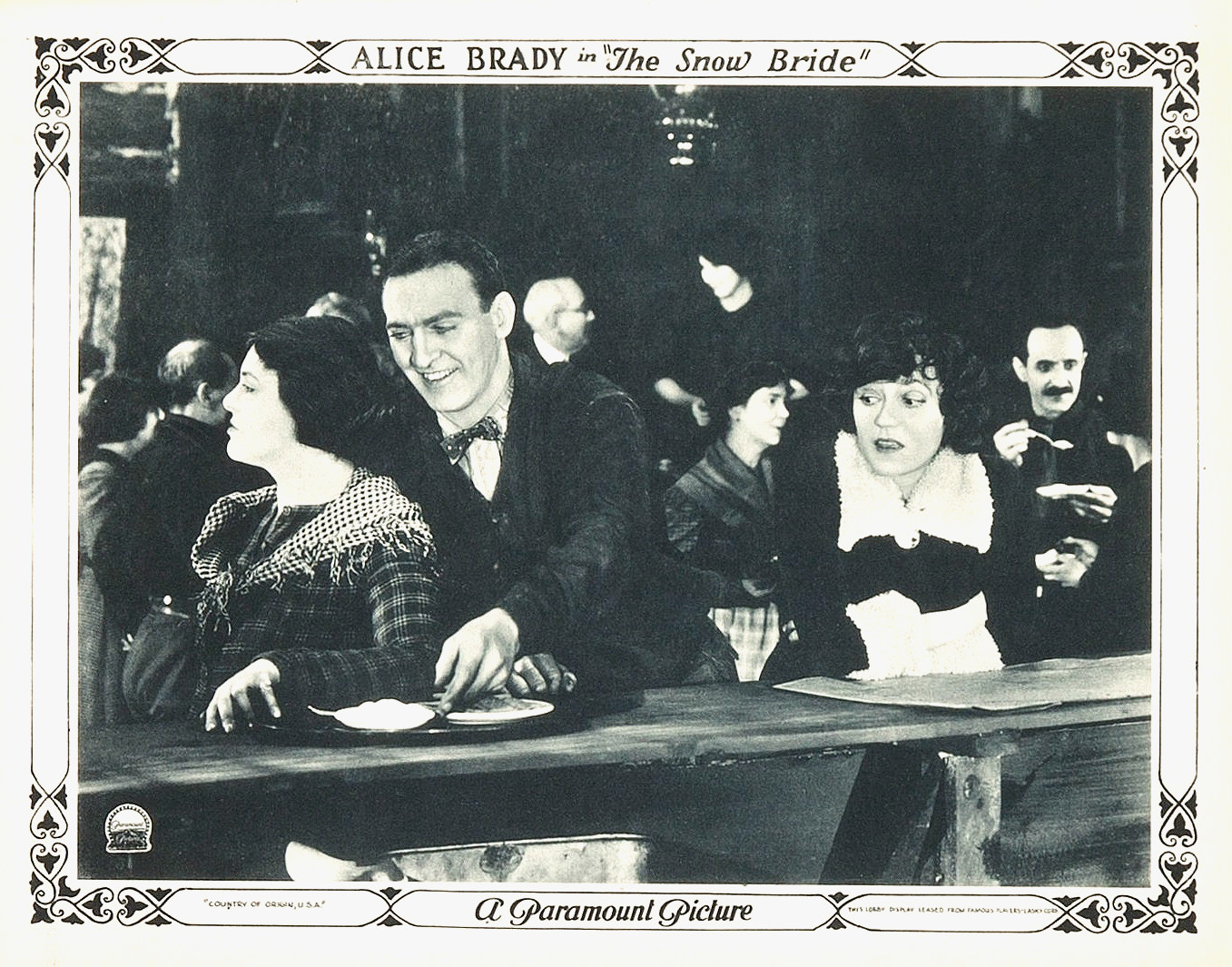
- Lobby card
- Directed by: Henry Kolker
- Screenplay by: Julie Herne; Sonya Levien
- Produced by: Adolph Zukor
- Starring: Alice Brady; Maurice 'Lefty' Flynn; Mario Majeroni; Nick Thompson; Jack Baston; Stephen Grattan
- Cinematography: George Webber
- Production company: Famous Players–Lasky Corporation
- Distributed by: Paramount Pictures
- Release date: April 29, 1923
- Running time: 60 minutes
- Country: United States
- Language: Silent (English intertitles)

The Snow Bride is a 1923 American silent drama film directed by Henry Kolker, written by Julie Herne and Sonya Levien, and starring Alice Brady, Maurice 'Lefty' Flynn, Mario Majeroni, Nick Thompson, Jack Baston, and Stephen Grattan. It was released on April 29, 1923, by Paramount Pictures. It is not known whether the film currently survives.

== Cast ==
- Alice Brady as Annette Leroux
- Maurice 'Lefty' Flynn as André Porel
- Mario Majeroni as Gaston Laroux
- Nick Thompson as Indian Charlie
- Jack Baston as Paul Gerard
- Stephen Grattan as Padre
- William Cavanaugh as Pierre
- Margaret Morgan as Leonia

== Production ==
Exteriors for The Snow Bride was shot on location at Lake Timiskaming, and interiors at the Long Island studio. Studio publication Paramount Pep reported that the cold weather affected the film so severely, that the film "cracked to bits" upon rewind.
