= Bluebeard's Seven Wives =

1926 film

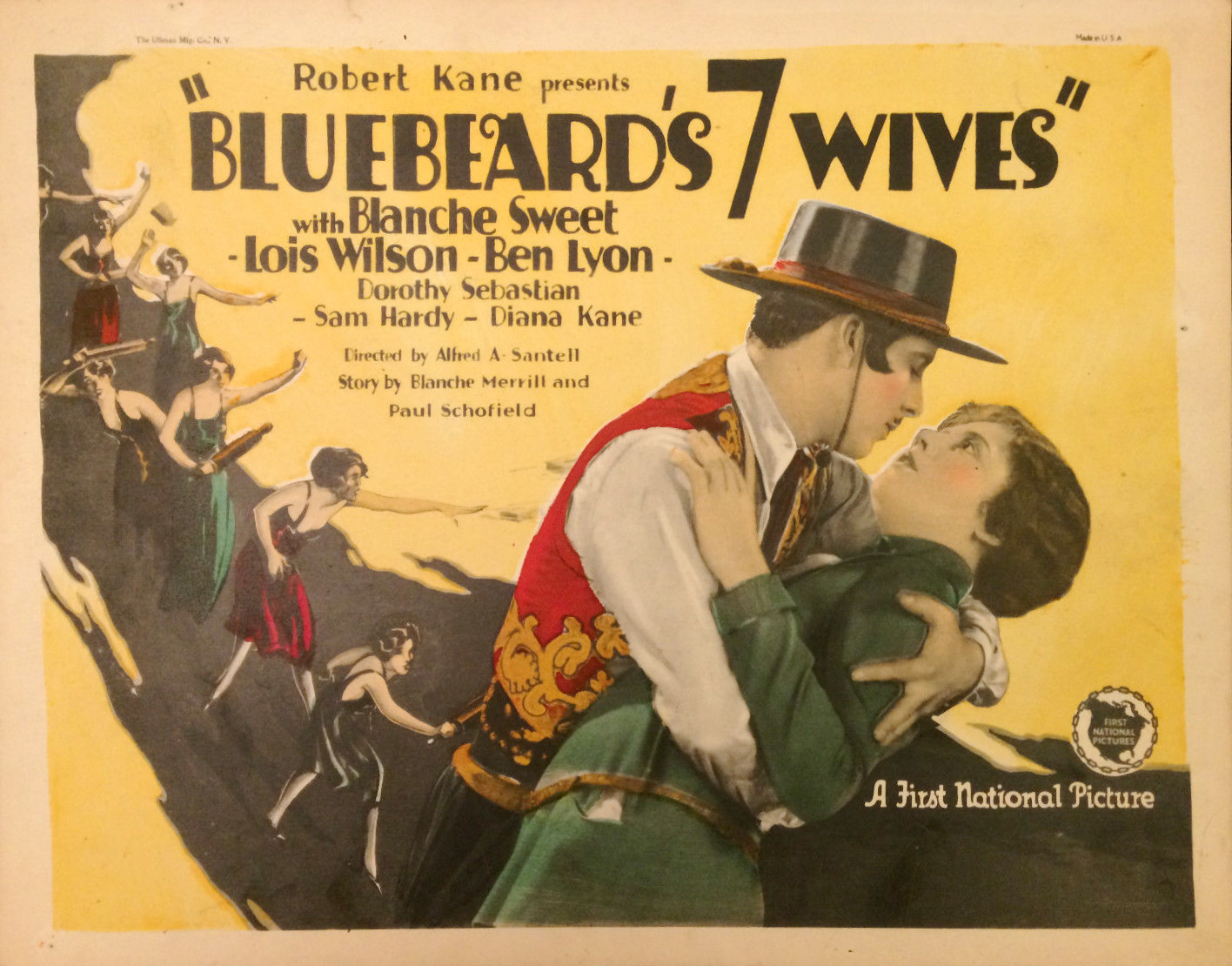
- Lobby card
- Directed by: Alfred Santell
- Written by: Randolph Bartlett
- Story by: Blanche Merrill; Paul Schofield
- Produced by: Robert Kane
- Starring: Ben Lyon; Lois Wilson; Blanche Sweet
- Cinematography: Robert Haller
- Distributed by: First National Pictures
- Release date: January 13, 1926
- Running time: 94 minutes
- Country: United States
- Language: Silent (English intertitles)

Bluebeard's Seven Wives is a 1926 American silent comedy film produced and released by First National Pictures. It was directed by Alfred Santell and starred Ben Lyon, Lois Wilson, and Blanche Sweet.

== Plot ==
As described in a film magazine review, John Hart, who works as a teller in a bank, is fired after a shortage is found in his account. He gets a job at a movie studio, where they consider him a "find" and everyone works to make him a star. The publicity department has his name changed to Don Juan Hartez and he is planted on an incoming steamer. As a new screen lover, a press agent scheme is to marry him to seven wives. However, John balks after a few fake marriages and runs off and marries his sweetheart Mary Kelly.

== Cast ==
- Ben Lyon as John Hart / Don Juan Hartez
- Lois Wilson as Mary Kelly
- Blanche Sweet as Juliet
- Dorothy Sebastian as Gilda La Bray
- Diana Kane as Kathra Granni
- Sam Hardy as Gindelheim
- Dick Bernard as Film Magnate
- Andrew Mack as Film Magnate
- Daniel Pennell as B. C. Duval
- Wilfred Lytell as Paris
- Katherine Ray as Wife
- Ruby Blaine as Wife
- Lucy Fox as Wife
- Muriel Spring as Wife
- Kathleen Martyn as Wife

== Preservation ==
With no prints of Bluebeard's Seven Wives located in any film archives, it is a lost film.
