= The Misfit Wife =

1920 film

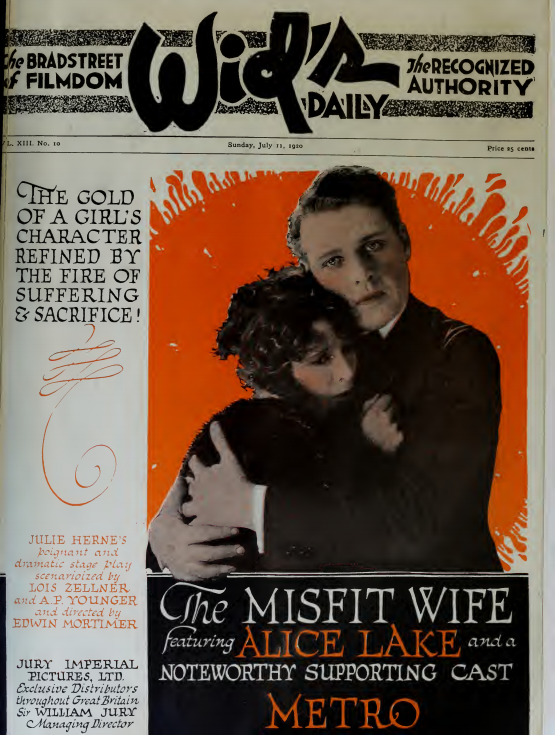
- Directed by: Edmund Mortimer
- Written by: Lois Zellner; Andrew Percival Younger
- Based on: The Outsider by Julie Herne
- Starring: Alice Lake; Forrest Stanley; William Steele
- Cinematography: Arthur Reeves
- Production company: Metro Pictures
- Distributed by: Metro Pictures
- Release date: July 19, 1920
- Running time: 60 minutes
- Country: United States
- Languages: Silent; English intertitles

The Misfit Wife is a 1920 American silent drama film directed by Edmund Mortimer and starring Alice Lake, Forrest Stanley and William Steele. It is based on the 1916 play The Outsider by Julie Herne.

== Cast ==
- Alice Lake as Katie Malloy
- Forrest Stanley as Peter Crandall
- William Steele as Duff Simpson
- Frederick Vroom as Dr. Morton
- Graham Pettie as Shad Perkins
- Edward Martindel as Henry Gilsey
- Leota Lorraine as Edith Gilsey
- Helen Pillsbury as Mrs. Crandall
- Jack Livingston as Bert McBride
- Jim Blackwell as The Porter

== Bibliography ==
- Goble, Alan. The Complete Index to Literary Sources in Film. Walter de Gruyter, 1999.
