= The Brown Derby (film) =

1926 film directed by Charles Hines

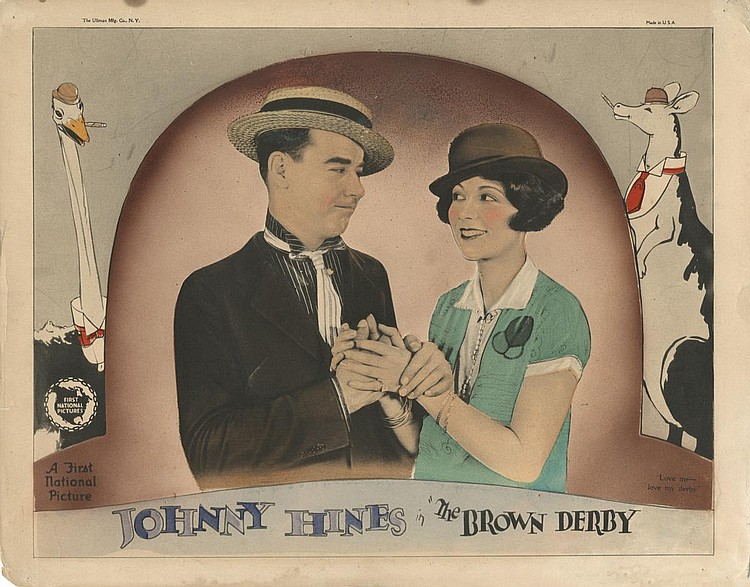
- Directed by: Charles Hines
- Written by: J.P. McGowan; Bert Wheeler; Howard J. Green (uncredited)
- Based on: The Brown Derby by Brian Marlow and E.S. Merlin
- Produced by: C.C. Burr
- Starring: Johnny Hines; Ruth Dwyer; Edmund Breese
- Cinematography: George Peters; Albert Wetzel; Al Wilson
- Edited by: George Amy
- Production company: C.C. Burr Productions
- Distributed by: First National Pictures
- Release date: July 4, 1926
- Running time: 70 minutes
- Country: United States
- Language: Silent (English intertitles)

The Brown Derby is a 1926 American silent comedy film directed by Charles Hines and starring Johnny Hines, Ruth Dwyer, and Edmund Breese. A young plumber inherits a brown Derby hat from his uncle, which is said to bring good luck to its owner. While wearing it fortune does seem to smile on him, although it is in fact a case of mistaken identity.

== Cast ==
- Johnny Hines as Tommy Burke
- Diana Kane as Edith Worthing
- Ruth Dwyer as Betty Caldwell
- Flora Finch as Aunt Anna
- Edmund Breese as John J. Caldwell
- J. Barney Sherry as Capt. Shay
- Bradley Barker as Robert Farrell
- Herbert Standing as Adolph Plummer (*Herbert Standing died in 1923; the Herbert Standing here is probably his son Herbert Standing Jr.)
- Harold Foshay as Frank Boyle
- Bob Slater as Sam

== Preservation ==
The film survives in the archives of the Museum of Modern Art (MOMA), UCLA Film and Television Archive, and National Archives of Canada.

== Bibliography ==
- Munden, Kenneth White. The American Film Institute Catalog of Motion Pictures Produced in the United States, Part 1. University of California Press, 1997.
