= Tiger Love (1924 film) =

1924 film by George Melford

- Directed by: George Melford
- Screenplay by: Manuel Penella; Howard Hawks; Julie Herne
- Produced by: Adolph Zukor
- Starring: Antonio Moreno; Estelle Taylor; G. Raymond Nye; Manuel Caméré; Edgar Norton; David Torrence; Snitz Edwards
- Cinematography: Charles G. Clarke
- Production company: Famous Players–Lasky Corporation
- Distributed by: Paramount Pictures
- Release date: June 30, 1924
- Running time: 60 minutes
- Country: United States
- Language: Silent

Tiger Love is a lost 1924 American drama silent film directed by George Melford, written by Manuel Penella, Howard Hawks, and Julie Herne, and starring Antonio Moreno, Estelle Taylor, G. Raymond Nye, Manuel Caméré, Edgar Norton, David Torrence, and Snitz Edwards. It was released on June 30, 1924, by Paramount Pictures.

== Cast ==
- Antonio Moreno as The Wildcat
- Estelle Taylor as Marcheta
- G. Raymond Nye as El Pezuño
- Manuel Caméré as Don Ramon
- Edgar Norton as Don Victoriano Fuestes
- David Torrence as Don Miguel Castelar
- Snitz Edwards as Te Hunchback
- Monte Collins as Father Zaspard

== Preservation ==
With no holdings located in archives, Tiger Love is considered a lost film.
