= Miss Bluebeard =

1925 film by Frank Tuttle

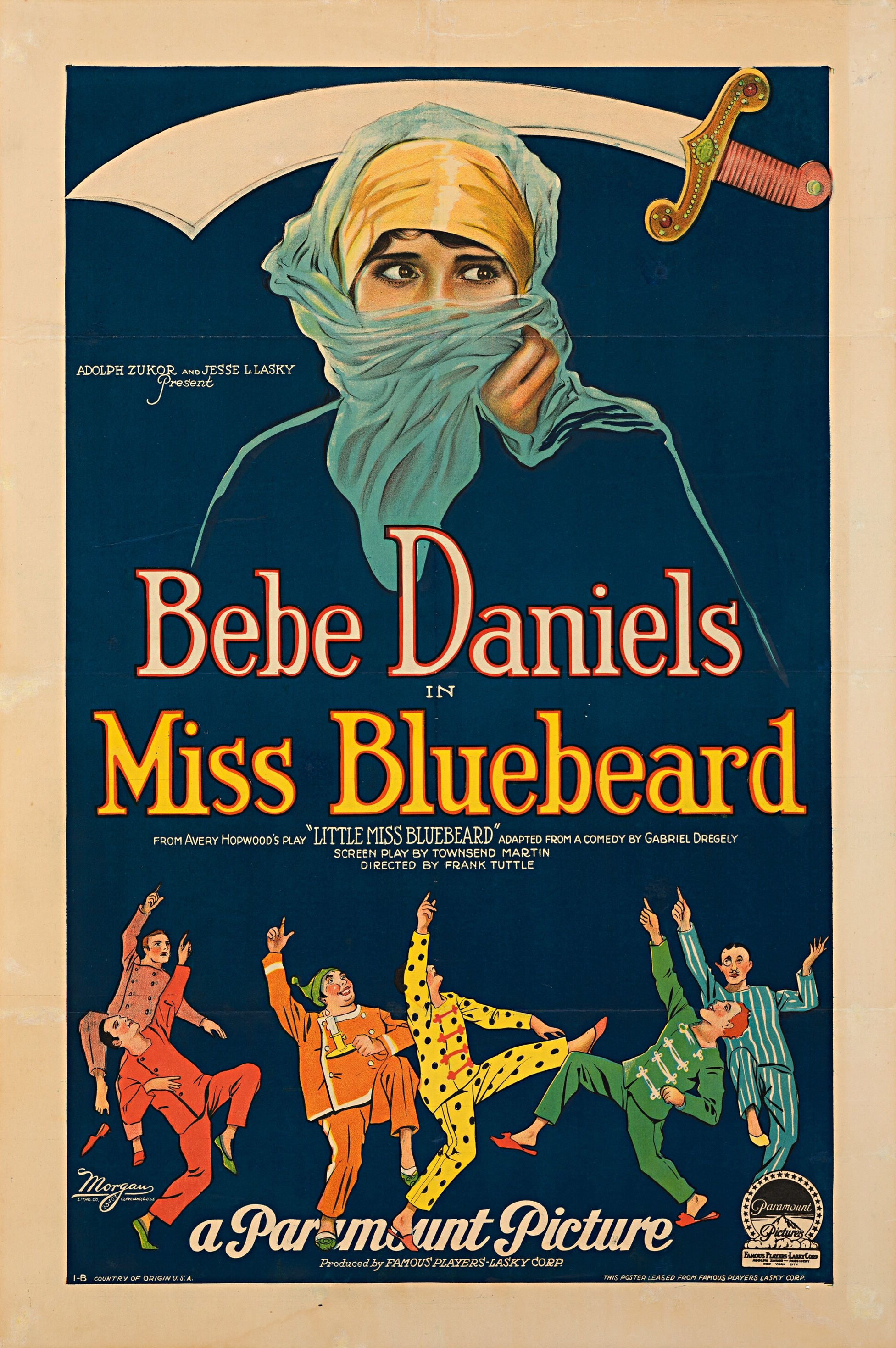
- Theatrical release poster
- Directed by: Frank Tuttle
- Written by: Gábor Drégely; Townsend Martin (scenario)
- Based on: Little Miss Bluebeard by Avery Hopwood
- Produced by: Adolph Zukor; Jesse L. Lasky
- Starring: Bebe Daniels
- Cinematography: J. Roy Hunt
- Production company: Famous Players-Lasky Corporation
- Distributed by: Paramount Pictures
- Release date: January 26, 1925
- Running time: 62 minutes
- Country: United States
- Language: Silent (English intertitles)

Miss Bluebeard is a 1925 American silent comedy film directed by Frank Tuttle and starring Bebe Daniels. It is based on a play, Little Miss Bluebeard, by Avery Hopwood.

== Synopsis ==
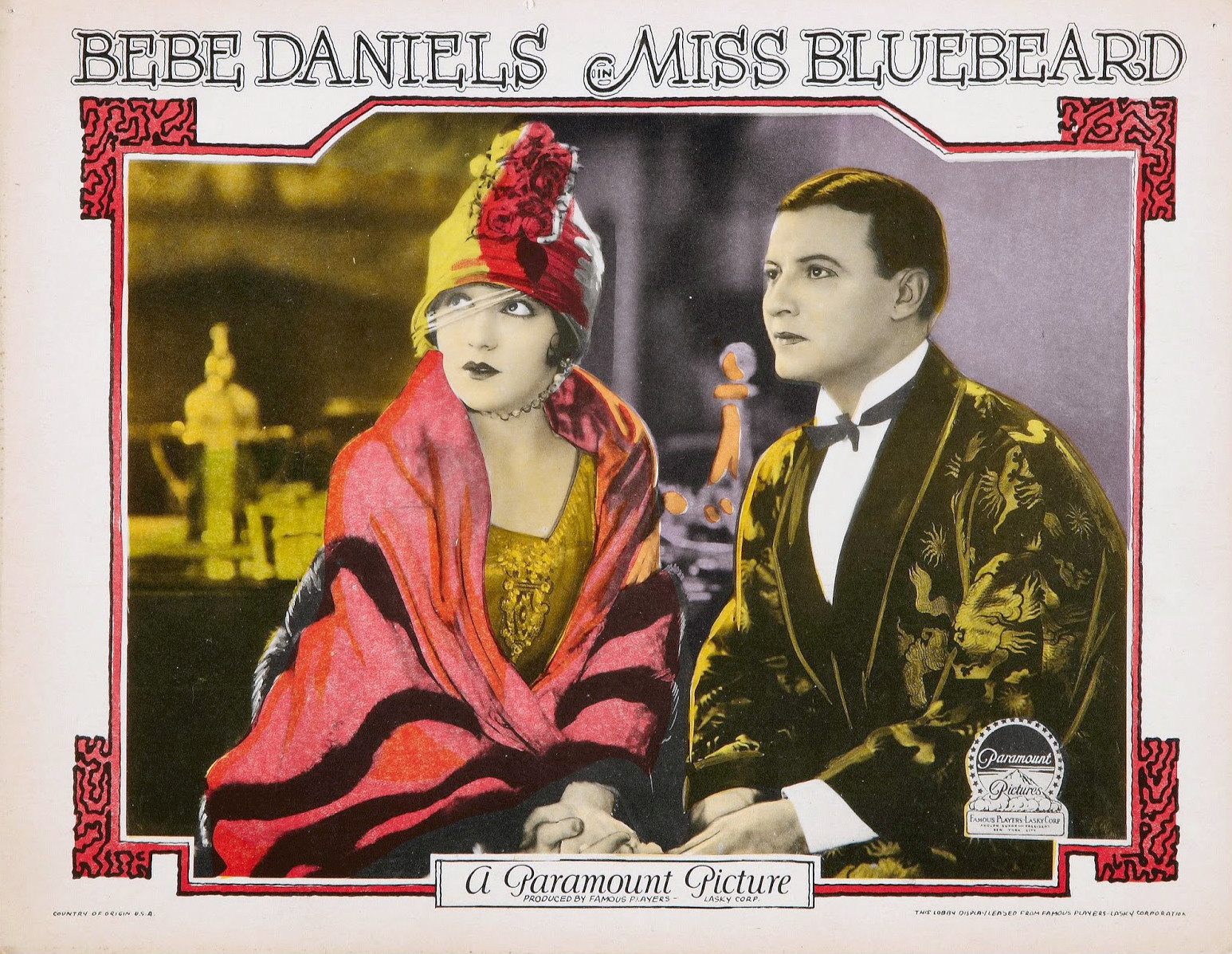
Lobby card

Larry Charters is a composer who is visiting Paris, and is exhausted from so many women wanting to meet him and ask for his autograph. When he is about to leave and head back home, he asks his friend Bob to stem the tide of admiring ladies rushing his hotel door by pretending to be him. Larry takes off, and Bob does his best to pretend he is Larry. But Colette, an actress who inadvertently causes Bob to miss the boat train, finds that she gets more than she bargained for by befriending "Larry". While looking for a room for the night, the inebriated Mayor accidentally marries them as Mr. and Mrs. Charters. Undeterred, the couple meet up with the real Larry in London the next day.

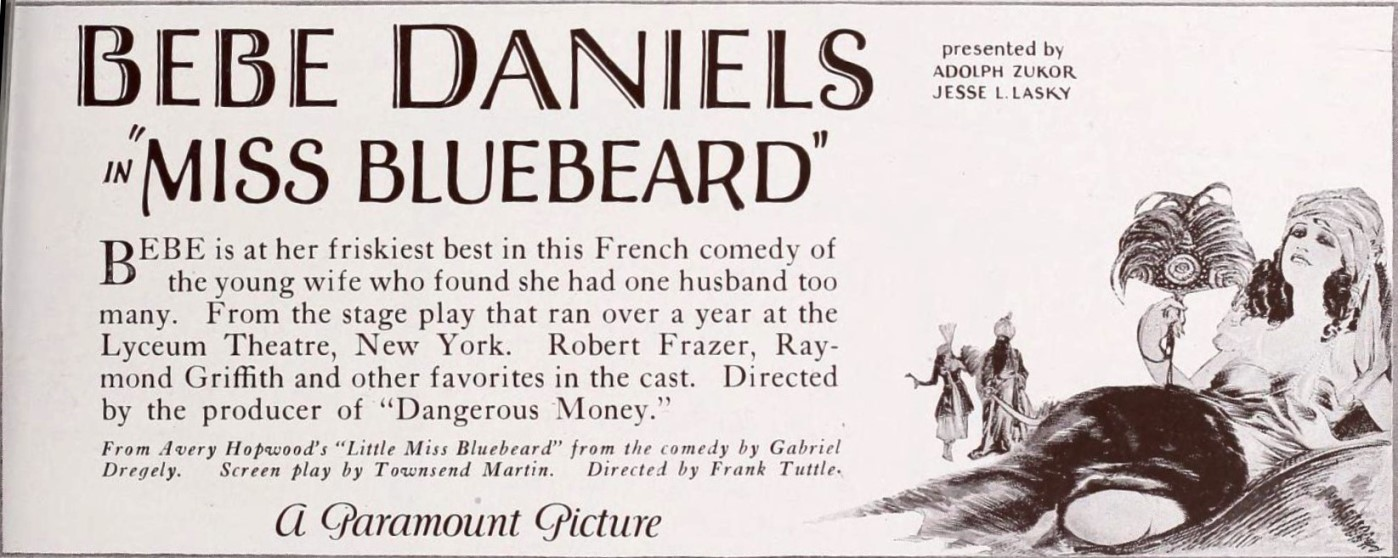
Miss Bluebeard, 1925

Larry has more girl-trouble with two women admirers nearly meeting in the hallway, one of whom is Lulu, who is nearly psychotically jealous of any other woman. Bertie Bird, who seems to do nothing more than sleep, is one of Larry's friends, and who asks for a key to his guest room so he can get a good night's sleep, after his napping all day. When Bob and Colette arrive, it is apparent that Larry and she fall in love instantly, but are too embarrassed to admit it, especially as she is married to Bob, although under Larry's name. Things get even more complex when Colette goes to bed in the guest bedroom, and is joined under the covers by Bertie. Suddenly Colette is branded as the Female Bluebeard, since she is "married" three times, albeit by three very tenuous means.

== Cast ==
- Bebe Daniels as Colette Girard
- Robert Frazer as Larry Charters
- Kenneth MacKenna as Bob Hawley
- Raymond Griffith as The Honorable Bertie Bird
- Martha O'Dwyer as Lulu (credited as Martha Madison)
- Diana Kane as Gloria Harding
- Lawrence D'Orsay as Colonel Harding
- Florence Billings as Eva
- Ivan F. Simpson as Bounds (credited as Ivan Simpson)

== Preservation ==
Prints of Miss Bluebeard are held in the BFI National Archive, UCLA Film and Television Archive, George Eastman Museum Motion Picture Collection, and Berkeley Art Museum and Pacific Film Archive.

== See also ==
- Her Wedding Night (1930)
