= The Perfect Sap =

Lost 1927 film

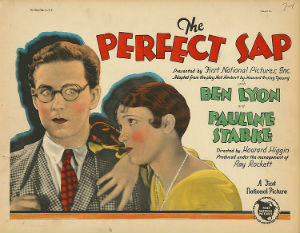
- Theatrical release poster
- Directed by: Howard Higgin
- Based on: Not Herbert (play) by Howard Irving Young
- Starring: Ben Lyon; Pauline Starke; Virginia Lee Corbin; Lloyd Whitlock; Diana Kane; Byron Douglas; Christine Compton
- Cinematography: John W. Boyle
- Production company: Ray Rockett Productions
- Distributed by: First National Pictures
- Release date: January 23, 1927
- Running time: 60 minutes
- Country: United States
- Language: Silent (English intertitles)

The Perfect Sap is a lost 1927 American silent comedy film directed by Howard Higgin. It is based on the 1926 play Not Herbert by Howard Irving Young. The film stars Ben Lyon, Pauline Starke, Virginia Lee Corbin, Lloyd Whitlock, Diana Kane, Byron Douglas, and Christine Compton. The film was released on January 23, 1927, by First National Pictures.

== Cast ==
- Ben Lyon as Herbert Alden
- Pauline Starke as Polly Stoddard
- Virginia Lee Corbin as Ruth Webster
- Lloyd Whitlock as Tracy Sutton
- Diana Kane as Roberta Alden
- Byron Douglas as Stephen Alden
- Christine Compton as Mrs. Stephen Alden
- Charles Craig as Fletcher
- Sam Hardy as Nick Fanshaw
- Tammany Young as George Barrow
- Helen Rowland as Cissie Alden
