= Rubber Heels =

1927 film by Victor Heerman

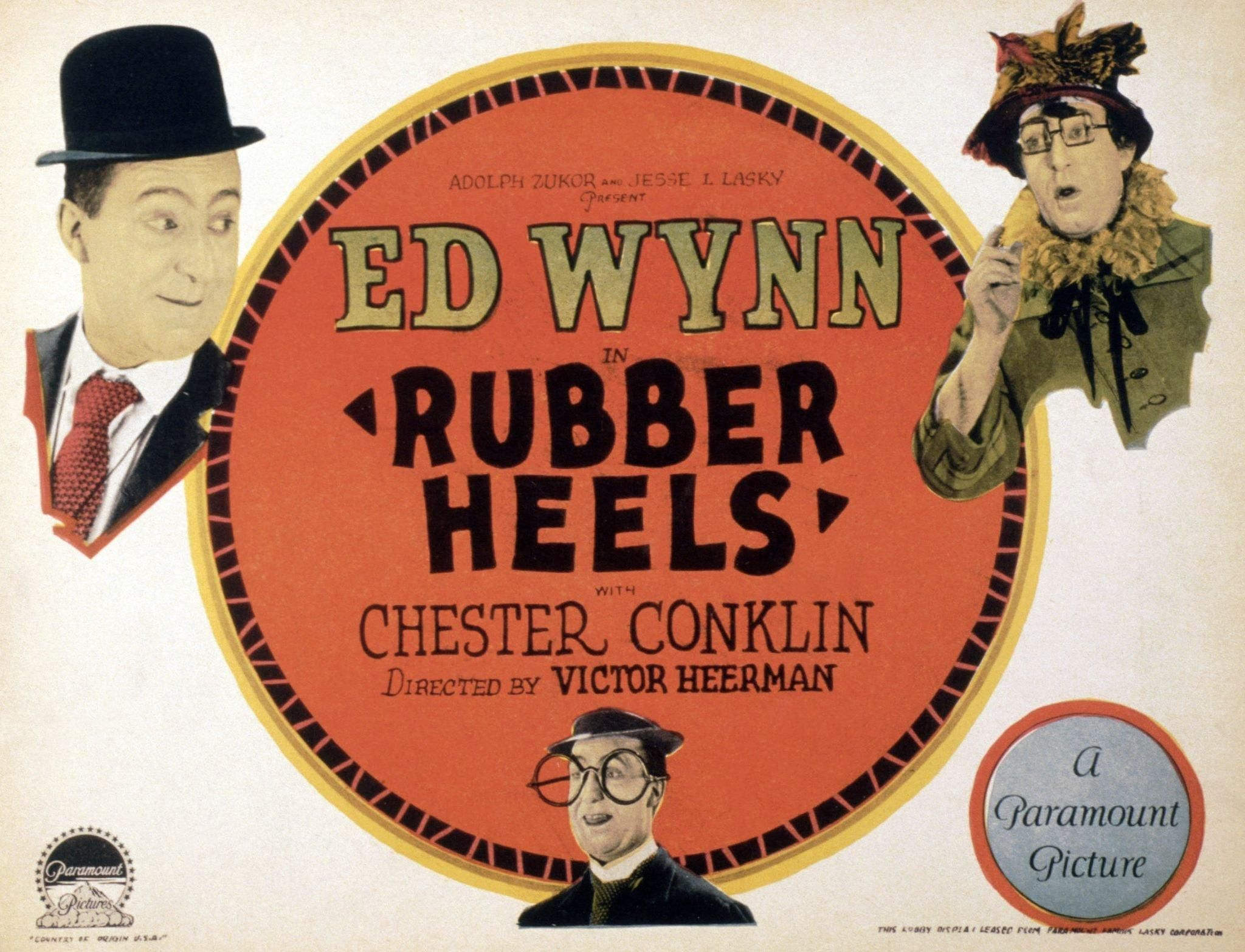
- Directed by: Victor Heerman
- Written by: Thomas J. Crizer; Ray Harris; J. Clarkson Miller; Sam Mintz; William Le Baron
- Produced by: Adolph Zukor; Jesse Lasky
- Starring: Ed Wynn; Thelma Todd
- Cinematography: J. Roy Hunt
- Distributed by: Paramount Pictures
- Release date: June 11, 1927
- Running time: 7 reels (6,303 feet)
- Country: United States
- Language: Silent (English intertitles)

Rubber Heels is a 1927 American silent comedy film produced by Famous Players–Lasky and distributed through Paramount Pictures. It stars stage comedian Ed Wynn in his first motion picture.

== Cast ==
- Ed Wynn as Homer Thrush
- Chester Conklin as Tennyson Hawks
- Thelma Todd as Princess Anne
- Robert Andrews as Tom Raymond
- John Harrington as Grogan
- Bradley Barker as Gentleman Joe
- Armand Cortez as 'The Ray'
- Ruth Donnelly as Fanny Pratt
- Mario Majeroni as Prince Zibatchefsky
- Truly Shattuck as Mrs. P. Belmont-Fox
