= Her Love Story =

1924 film by Allan Dwan

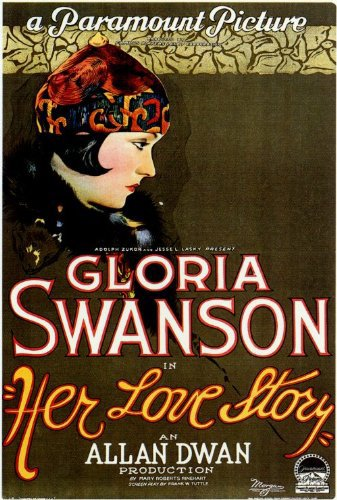
- Theatrical poster
- Directed by: Allan Dwan
- Written by: Frank Tuttle
- Based on: "Her Majesty, the Queen" by Mary Roberts Rinehart
- Produced by: Allan Dwan; Adolph Zukor; Jesse L. Lasky
- Starring: Gloria Swanson; Ian Keith; George Fawcett
- Cinematography: George Webber
- Production company: Famous Players–Lasky
- Distributed by: Paramount Pictures
- Release date: October 6, 1924
- Running time: 70 minutes
- Country: United States
- Language: Silent (English intertitles)

Her Love Story is a 1924 American silent romantic drama film directed by Allan Dwan and starring Gloria Swanson. It was produced by Famous Players–Lasky, distributed by Paramount Pictures, and based on the short story "Her Majesty, the Queen" by Mary Roberts Rinehart.

== Cast ==
- Gloria Swanson as Princess Marie
- Ian Keith as Captain Kavor
- George Fawcett as Archduke
- Echlin Gayer as The King
- Mario Majeroni as Prime Minister
- Sidney Herbert as Archduke's Adviser
- Donald Hall as Court Physician
- Baroness DeHedeman as Lady in Waiting
- Jane Auburn as Clothilde
- Bert Wales as Boy
- General Lodijensky as Minister of War

== Preservation ==
With no prints of Her Love Story located in any film archives, it is a lost film.

== See also ==
- List of lost films
