= Julie Herne =

American playwright, screenwriter and actress

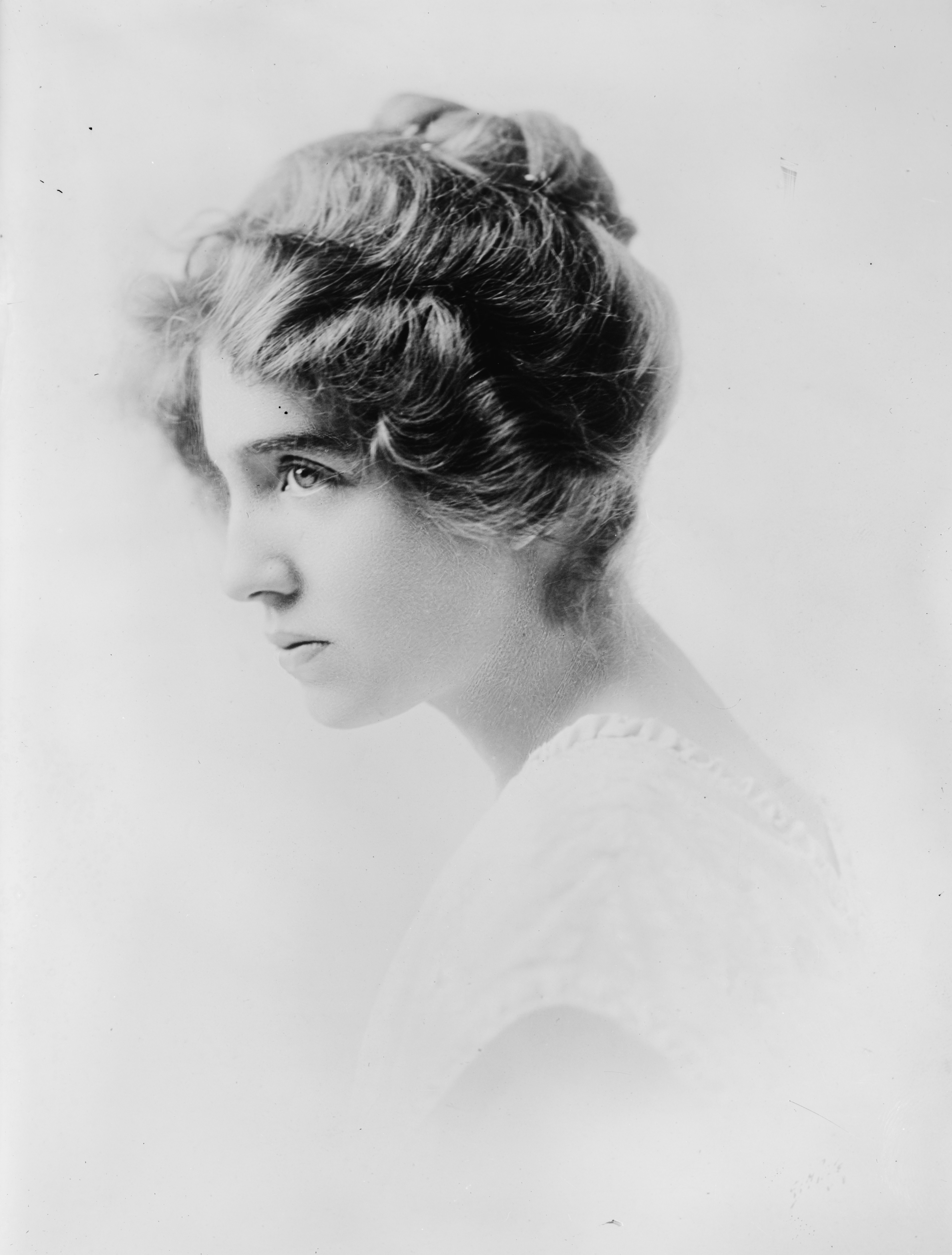
- Born: Julie Adrianne Herne; October 31, 1880; Boston, Massachusetts, US
- Died: February 25, 1955 (aged 74); New York City, US
- Occupations: Screenwriter, playwright, actress
- Parents: James A. Herne (father); Katherine Corcoran (mother)
- Relatives: Chrystal Herne (sister)

Julie Adrianne Herne (October 31, 1880 – February 25, 1955) was an American playwright, screenwriter, actress, and film scout active during Hollywood's silent era.

== Biography ==
Herne was born in Boston, Massachusetts, in 1880, the daughter of playwright James A. Herne and stage actress Katherine Corcoran. Her sister was actress Chrystal Herne.

She had always dreamed of writing plays, and she began writing and acting in her teenage years. She had a number of plays hit Broadway in the 1910s and 1920s.

By the early 1920s, she was employed as a scenarist at Paramount, where she worked on films like Dangerous Money and The Snow Bride. Her film career tapered off around 1925, although she continued writing for the stage.

Herne was found dead in her New York City apartment in 1955. In her suicide note, she blamed a bad review as the source of her despair.

== Selected filmography ==
- Sackcloth and Scarlet (1925)
- The Dangerous Flirt (1924)
- Dangerous Money (1924)
- The Side Show of Life (1924)
- Tiger Love (1924)
- The Heart Raider (1923)
- The Snow Bride (1923)
- The Misfit Wife (1920)
