= Mario Majeroni =

American dramatist

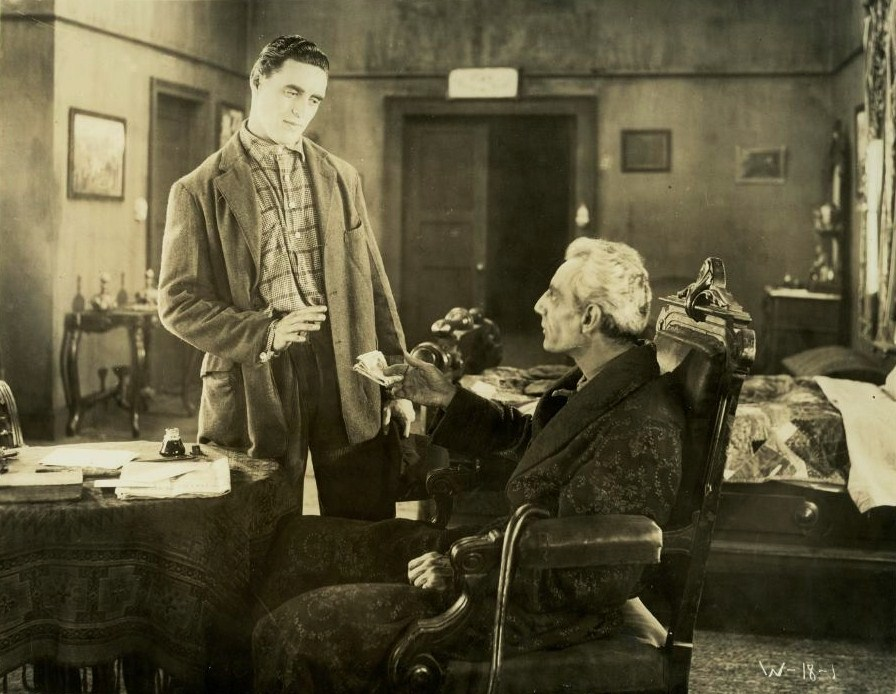
- George Walsh and Mario Majeroni in From Now On (1920)
- Born: 1870; Sardegna, Italy
- Died: November 18, 1931 (aged 60–61); New York City, U.S.
- Resting place: Kensico Cemetery, Westchester County Valhalla, New York
- Occupation: Actor
- Relatives: George (Giorgio) Majeroni (brother); Adelaide Ristori (great-aunt)

Mario Majeroni (1870–1931) was an Italian-born American playwright and stage and film actor.

== Biography ==
Majeroni was the son of Eduardo and Giulia Majeroni. Giulia was a niece of Adelaide Ristori. Mario came to the United States in 1906 and started acting on Broadway that year. Prior to coming to the United States he had lived and worked in Australia, where his parents had a successful dramatic company noted for one of the earliest stage adaptations of For the Term of His Natural Life. In 1914 he started appearing in silent films after years of stage work. He never left the stage and alternated between Broadway and motion pictures. He appeared in films with many silent stars of the day and made his last film in 1927 appearing with Chester Conklin in Paramount's Rubber Heels. Majeroni never appeared in sound films and preferred Broadway plays to talkies. He was appearing in a play when he died in New York in November 1931. He is buried in an actor's plot at Kensico Cemetery.

Majeroni was related to Italian theatre royalty, his mother's aunt was the legendary 19th century Italian actress Adelaide Ristori.

Majeroni married Nellie Harbin in Sydney on 20 September 1899; she died in Sydney Hospital on 20 September 1906; He was in New York, playing The Prince of India on Broadway.

Majeroni's brother George (Giorgio) Majeroni was also a stage and film actor. He was born in Australia, whereas Mario was born seven years earlier in Sardinia.

== Selected filmography ==
- The Nightingale (1914)
- The Dictator (1915)
- Sherlock Holmes (1916)
- Less Than the Dust (1916)
- The White Raven (1917)
- Heart's Desire (1917)
- A Sleeping Memory (1917)
- The Valley of Silent Men (1922)
- The Face in the Fog (1922)
- Destiny's Isle (1922)
- Enemies of Women (1923)
- The Snow Bride (1923)
- The Steadfast Heart (1923)
- The Humming Bird (1923)
- Her Love Story (1924)
- Argentine Love (1924)
- Share and Share Alike (1925)
- The Little French Girl (1925)
- The King on Main Street (1925)
- Rubber Heels (1927)

== See also ==
- Mario Majeroni Italian Wikipedia
