= Ralph P. Cousins =

US Army general (1891–1964)

Ralph Pittman Cousins
- Ralph P. Cousins in the 1940s
- Born: 1 December 1891; Mexia, Texas
- Died: 15 March 1964 (aged 72); Indio, California
- Burial place: Forest Lawn Memorial Park, Los Angeles
- Spouse: Diana Cousins (née Wilson)
- Military career
- Allegiance: United States
- Branch: United States Army
- Service years: 1915–1946
- Rank: Major general
- Service number: 0-3877
- Commands: Western Flying Training Command; Clark Field; Chanute Field; Payne Field
- Conflicts: Mexican Border War; World War I World War II
- Awards: Army Distinguished Service Medal
- Other work: Vice President and Secretary, Founders' Insurance Company; President, Los Angeles Board of Airport Commissioners

Ralph Pittman Cousins (1 December 1891 – 15 March 1964) was a United States Army major general Born in Mexia, Texas, he graduated from the United States Military Academy in 1915. He served in the Cavalry before transferring to the United States Army Air Corps. He served in a variety of command positions in the newly created air service of the United States Army and was instrumental in designing the model for what would become the commercial aviation system. Schools under his command trained many of the aircrews who served in all theaters of World War II. After retiring from the army, he became a businessman. Cousins died in 1964 and he was memorialized as an air pioneer who helped bring American air power from it beginnings to its power in World War II.

== Early life and education ==
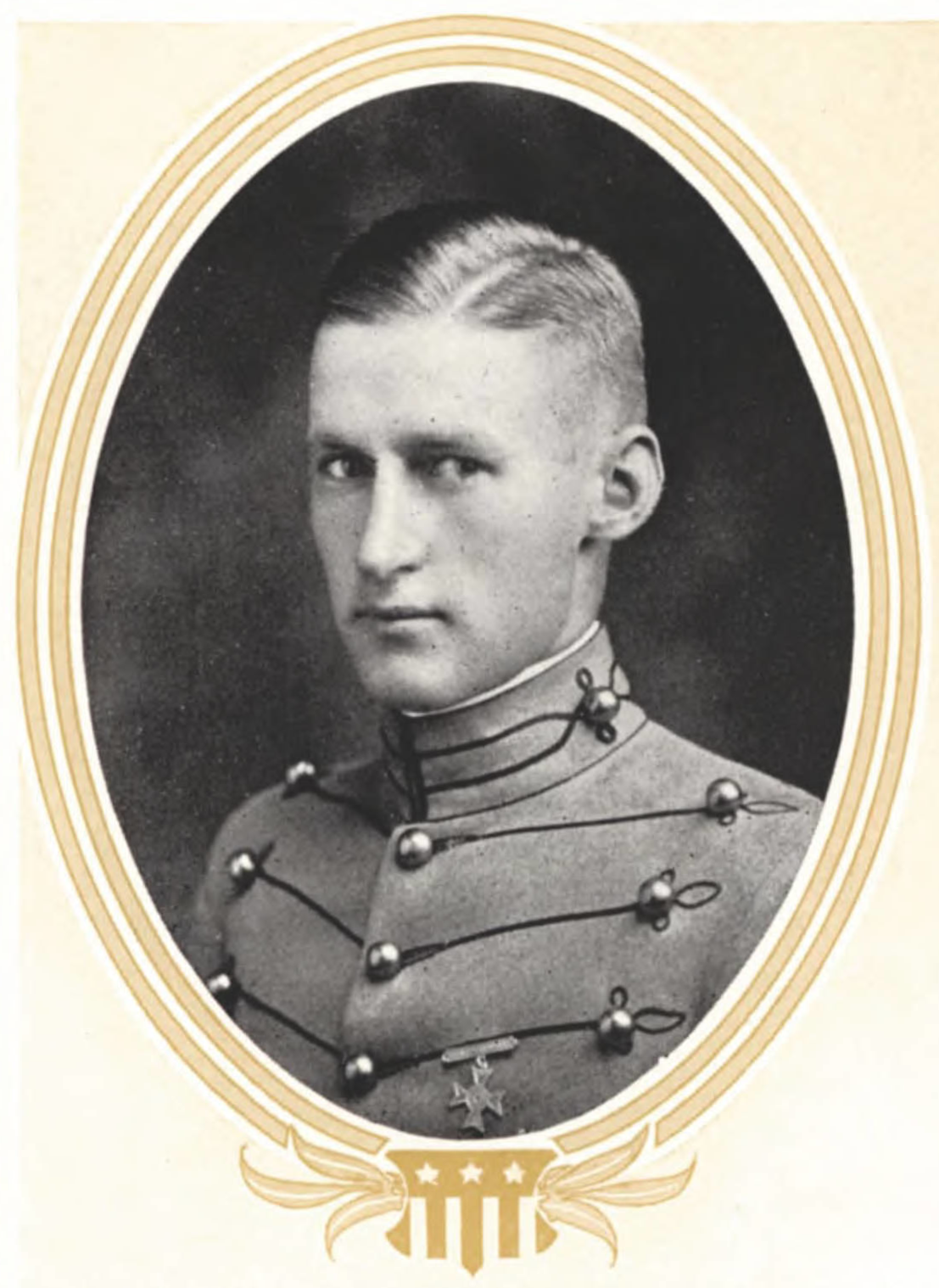
At West Point in 1915

Cousins was born on 1 December 1891, in Mexia, Texas, to Robert Bartow and Dora M. (Kelly) Cousins.

On 14 June 1911, he began his studies at the United States Military Academy at West Point, New York. He graduated on 12 June 1915, as a member of the class the stars fell on; his rank in the class was 129 of 164 and his Cullum number is 5441.

== Career ==
=== Pre-war ===
Cousins was commissioned as a second lieutenant of Cavalry on 12 June 1915. He was assigned to the 12th Cavalry in Brownsville, Texas, in September 1915 and performed border patrol activities, including actions against Mexican bandits, until February 1916, when he was transferred to the 6th Cavalry. Cousins participated in the Punitive Expedition into Mexico. He was promoted to the first lieutenant of Cavalry on 1 July 1916 and was transferred to the Big Bend District, Texas later that month.

In August 1916, Cousins was assigned to the Signal Corps Aviation School in San Diego, California. He graduated in May 1917 and was assigned to the 1st Aero Squadron as a pilot. From 16 May to 12 September 1917, he organized the School of Military Aeronautics in Austin, Texas, and became its commandant. While assigned to the school, he was promoted to captain on 25 July 1917. From 12 September to 8 December 1917, he was assigned to the Office of the Chief Signal Officer, Washington, D.C. Cousins was then assigned as the aviation representative at the Army War College until 1 February 1918.

=== World War I ===
Cousins was assigned to the American Expeditionary Force in France as a liaison officer to French and British aviation units, including the British Bristol Fighting Squadron. He performed duties at the front. He returned to the United States on approximately 21 May 1918 and was assigned as a member of the Air Service Control Board in the Office of the Director of Military Aeronautics in Washington, D.C. until 25 September 1918. On 30 June 1918, he received a temporary promotion to major of Cavalry. He was assigned as commander of Roosevelt Field, Group B, 1st Provisional Wing until 4 January 1919.

=== Inter-war years ===
Cousins was assigned as the commanding officer of Payne Field, West Point, Mississippi from 4 January 1919 to 1 June 1919 and as the commanding officer of the 1st Bombardment Group at Kelly Field, Texas from 15 June 1919 until September 1920. During this period, he was returned to the rank of captain of Cavalry on 27 February 1920, transferred to the Air Service on 1 July 1920 and received a temporary promotion to major of the Air Service on 18 July 1920. Cousins was a member of the advisory board, Chief Air Service in Washington, D.C., from September 1920 to August 1921.

From August 1921 to June 1922, Cousins was assigned as a student officer at Yale University, where he was graduated with a Master of Science degree. Following his graduation, he was assigned as a student officer at General Electric Company, Schenectady, New York from June 1922 through January 1923. While at Schenectady he was returned to the rank of captain of the Air Service on 4 November 1922. During 1923, he supervised Air Corps communications and the installation of radios for the Air Corps Model Airway, which operated between four United States cities; this model was the core of what became the commercial aviation system. He served as a commanding officer at Chanute Field, Illinois from November 1923 to September 1924. He returned to Washington, D.C. for duty in the Office of the Chief of the Air Corps from January 1925 through May 1928. During this time he was promoted again to major of the Air Service on 21 June 1925.

Cousins was assigned to foreign service as a commanding officer at Clark Field, Philippine Islands, from June 1928 through June 1930. After returning from overseas, Cousins was assigned as a student officer at the Air Corps Tactical School at Langley Field, Virginia, until 1931; he was rated as an Airplane Observer in September 1939. He attended the Army Command and General Staff School at Fort Leavenworth, Kansas, graduating on 22 May 1933; while a student he wrote "Tannenberg: a failure to command," a paper analyzing the failure of the command of the Russian Second Army before and during the battle of Tannenberg. After graduating from the Command and General Staff School, Cousins returned to Washington, D.C. for duty in charge of National Guard aviation units with the National Guard Bureau until late in 1936; during this assignment, he received a temporary promotion to lieutenant colonel in the Air Corps on 16 June 1936 and a permanent promotion to that rank on 22 December. In 1937, he attended and graduated from the Army War College. He moved to an assignment with the Assistant Chief of Staff, G1 at General Headquarters Air Force, Langley Field, Virginia, where he performed a variety of staff duties until 18 January 1942; on 1 April 1939, Cousins was rated as both a command pilot and combat observer. Cousins was promoted to colonel in the Army of the United States on 26 June 1941 and to brigadier general on 10 July 1941.

=== World War II ===
On 7 December 1941 (Pearl Harbor Day), Army Air Force Western Flying Training Command was operating six army flying schools and nine civilian contract flying schools. Cousins assumed command on 1 February 1942. At the end of the first full year of the war, Cousins' command included twenty-two army schools and twenty-one civilian contract schools in a multi-state operation from his headquarters in Santa Ana, California. Cousins was promoted to major general in the Army of the United States on 16 February 1942. He was permanently promoted to colonel in the Air Corps on 21 April 1944. During 1944, Cousins visited Mather Field for an inspection. He observed that African-American officers were dining in the same mess as white Americans. He ordered that the mess facilities be segregated. African American officers stopped using the mess entirely. Cousins commanded the unit until 15 August 1945.

Cousins retired from the army with a disability on 31 March 1946.

== Later life and death ==
Cousins married Diana Wilson Fitzmaurice in 1945. He helped organize the Founders' Insurance Company in Los Angeles; he served as its vice president and its secretary, and as a member of the board of directors until the company was sold in 1950.

Cousins was appointed to the Los Angeles Board of Airport Commissioners in 1950. In 1955, he predicted that large gains in passenger traffic and freight shipments at Los Angeles International Airport would lead to "utter chaos" by 1960 unless improvements were made. In October 1956, Cousins, who had become president of the board of commissioners, announced that the design of the new airport had been approved by the board following a $159 million bond issue.

In January 1950, Cousins was serving as chairman of the Southern California United Service Organizations.

On 15 March 1964, Cousins was stricken while on his ranch near Indio, California. He was transported to Casitas Hospital in Indio where he died later that day. Funeral services for Cousins were conducted at All Saints Episcopal Church, Beverly Hills, California and he was buried with full military honors, including a flyover, at Forest Lawn Memorial Park, Los Angeles. He was memorialized by the West Point Association of Graduates as an air pioneer who helped bring American air power from it beginnings to its power in World War II

== Awards ==
Distinguished Service Medal
Mexican Service Medal
World War I Victory Medal
American Campaign Medal
World War II Victory Medal
Cloud and Banner (China), grade not specified^{[A]}

^{A} Each of the nine grades of the Order of the Cloud and Banner features a unique ribbon
