= Footfall (disambiguation) =

Footfall is a 1985 science fiction novel.

Footfall or footfalls can also refer to:

== Other titled works ==
- Footfalls, a 1975 play by Samuel Beckett
- Footfalls (film), a lost 1921 American silent film

== Business usage ==
- Experian FootFall, a United Kingdom market research company
- The number of people who enter a shop or business in a particular period of time: see People counter#Footfall

== Other ==
- Gait, that is, the pattern of coordinated motion of limbs (or analogous entities) in moving them (or analogous members), including transitional maneuvers that effect transitions between such patterns
