= While New York Sleeps =

While New York Sleeps may refer to:

- While New York Sleeps (1920 film), an American crime drama film
- While New York Sleeps (1938 film), an American crime film
