= Blind Wives =

1920 film by Charles Brabin

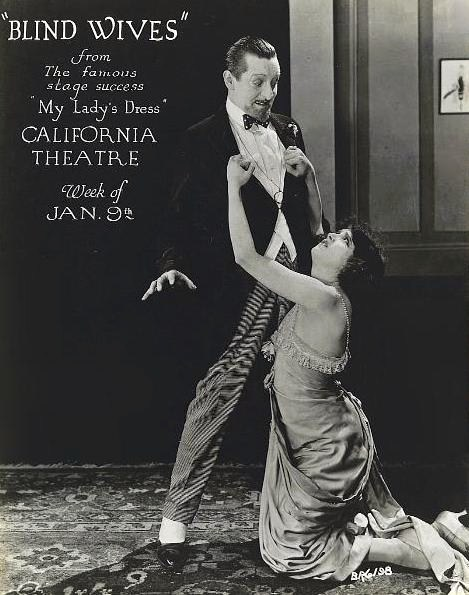
- Movie poster with Marc McDermott and Estelle Taylor
- Directed by: Charles Brabin (as Charles J. Brabin)
- Written by: Charles J. Brabin (scenario)
- Based on: My Lady's Dress by Edward Knoblock
- Produced by: William Fox
- Starring: Marc McDermott; Estelle Taylor
- Cinematography: George W. Lane
- Distributed by: Fox Film Corporation
- Release date: December 19, 1920
- Running time: 9 reels
- Country: United States
- Language: Silent (English intertitles)

Blind Wives is a 1920 American silent drama film produced and distributed by Fox Film Corporation and directed by Charles Brabin. The film reunites director Brabin with the stars of his previous success While New York Sleeps, Marc McDermott and Estelle Taylor. The film is based on a 1914 Broadway stage play by Edward Knoblock, My Lady's Dress which starred Mary Boland. This film survives in prints held by the George Eastman Museum and by the Library of Congress.

== Plot ==
As summarized in a film publication, the film shows through a dream sequence the various tragedies and hardships endured by those who make fancy dresses.

Anne's passion is clothes, but her husband closes her account at Jacquelin's. In a pique she goes to sleep and dreams, while her new dress with its flower design is draped over a chair. In the first episode, a crippled girl named Annie makes the flowers, and finally sells her wonderful hair and then goes away so that she will not stand in the way of her sister's happiness. The second episode shows the unhappy Russian story of the sable which decorates the gown, with a trapper coming home to discover that his wife is unfaithful. The third story involves Annette and her husband Nicolas, a weaver who is dying. Annette tries unsuccessfully to work the loom, but is saved by the arrival of an old sweetheart Johnny, who comes to her rescue. The last episode involves a mannequin (clothing shop worker?) who fights to maintain her reputation, and eventually kills the manager of the establishment when he tries to keep her away from her dying mother. Anne then awakens, cured of her passion for clothes and happy with her husband once more.

== Cast ==
- Marc McDermott as Husband
- Estelle Taylor as Anne/Annie/Annette
- Harry Southern as Johnny

unbilled

- Annette Bracy as The Maid
- Sally Crute as Business Woman
- Robert Schable as Charles
