= Estelle Taylor =

American actress (1894–1958)

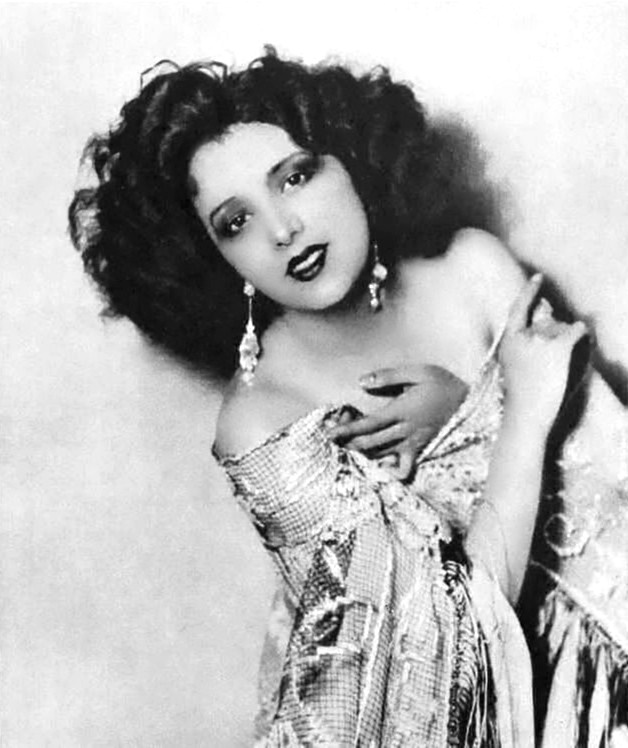
- Taylor in 1930
- Born: Ida Estelle Taylor; May 20, 1894; Wilmington, Delaware, U.S.
- Died: April 15, 1958 (aged 63); Los Angeles, California
- Resting place: Hollywood Forever Cemetery
- Occupations: Actress; singer; model
- Years active: 1919–1945
- Spouses: Kenneth Malcolm Peacock (m. 1911; div. 1925) Jack Dempsey (m. 1925; div. 1931) Paul Small (m. 1943; div. 1945)

Ida Estelle Taylor (May 20, 1894 (Note: Although 1899, 1900, or 1903 are usually stated to be her year of birth, the 1900 census and her death certificate confirm that she was born in 1894.) – April 15, 1958) was an American actress, singer, and model. With "dark-brown, almost black hair and brown eyes," she was regarded as one of the most beautiful silent film stars of the 1920s.

After her stage debut in 1919, Taylor began appearing in small roles in World and Vitagraph films. She achieved her first success with While New York Sleeps (1920), in which she played three different roles, including a femme fatale, or "vamp." She was a contract player of Fox Film Corporation and, later, Paramount Pictures, but for the majority of her career she freelanced. She became famous and was commended by reviewers for her portrayals of historical women in important films: Miriam in The Ten Commandments (1923), Mary, Queen of Scots in Dorothy Vernon of Haddon Hall (1924), and Lucrezia Borgia in Don Juan (1926).

Taylor and her second husband, world heavyweight champion Jack Dempsey, were a popular Hollywood couple. Although she made a successful transition to sound films, she retired from film acting in 1932 to focus entirely on her singing career. She was also active in animal welfare before her death from cancer in 1958. She was posthumously honored in 1960 with a star on the Hollywood Walk of Fame in the motion pictures category.

== Early life ==
Ida Estelle Taylor was born on May 20, 1894, in Wilmington, Delaware. Her father, Harry D. Taylor (born 1871), was born in Harrington, Delaware. Her mother, Ida LaBertha "Bertha" Barrett (1874–1965), was born in Easton, Pennsylvania, and later worked as a freelance makeup artist. The Taylors had another daughter, Helen (1898–1990), who also became an actress. (Note: Helen played supporting roles in Into the Web and The Sagebrush Lady, two features released in 1925.) According to the 1900 census, the family lived in a rented house at 805 Washington Street in Wilmington. In 1903, Ida LaBertha was granted a divorce from Harry on the ground of nonsupport; the following year, she married a cooper named Fred T. Krech. Ida LaBertha's third husband was Harry J. Boylan, a vaudevillian.

Taylor was raised by her maternal grandparents, Charles Christopher Barrett and Ida Lauber Barrett. Charles Barrett ran a piano store in Wilmington, and Taylor studied piano. Her childhood ambition was to become a stage actress, but her grandparents initially disapproved of her theatrical aspirations. When she was ten years old she sang the role of "Buttercup" in a benefit performance of the opera H.M.S. Pinafore in Wilmington. She attended high school but dropped out because she refused to apologize after a troublesome classmate caused her to spill ink from her inkwell on the floor. In 1911, she married bank cashier Kenneth M. Peacock. The couple remained together for five years until Taylor decided to become an actress. She soon found work as an artists' model, posing for Howard Pyle, Harvey Dunn, Leslie Thrasher, and other painters and illustrators.

In April 1918, Taylor moved to New York City to study acting at the Sargent Dramatic School. She worked as a hat model for a wholesale millinery store to earn money for her tuition and living expenses. At Sargent Dramatic School, she wrote and performed one-act plays, studied voice inflection and diction, and was noticed by a singing teacher named Mr. Samoiloff who thought her voice was suitable for opera. Samoiloff gave Taylor singing lessons on a contingent basis and, within several months, recommended her to theatrical manager Henry Wilson Savage for a part in the musical Lady Billy. She auditioned for Savage and he offered her work as an understudy to the actress who had the second role in the musical. At the same time, playwright George V. Hobart offered her a role as a "comedy vamp" in his play Come-On, Charlie, and Taylor, who had no experience in stage musicals, preferred the non-musical role and accepted Hobart's offer.

== Career ==
=== Broadway debut and Fox (1919–1922) ===
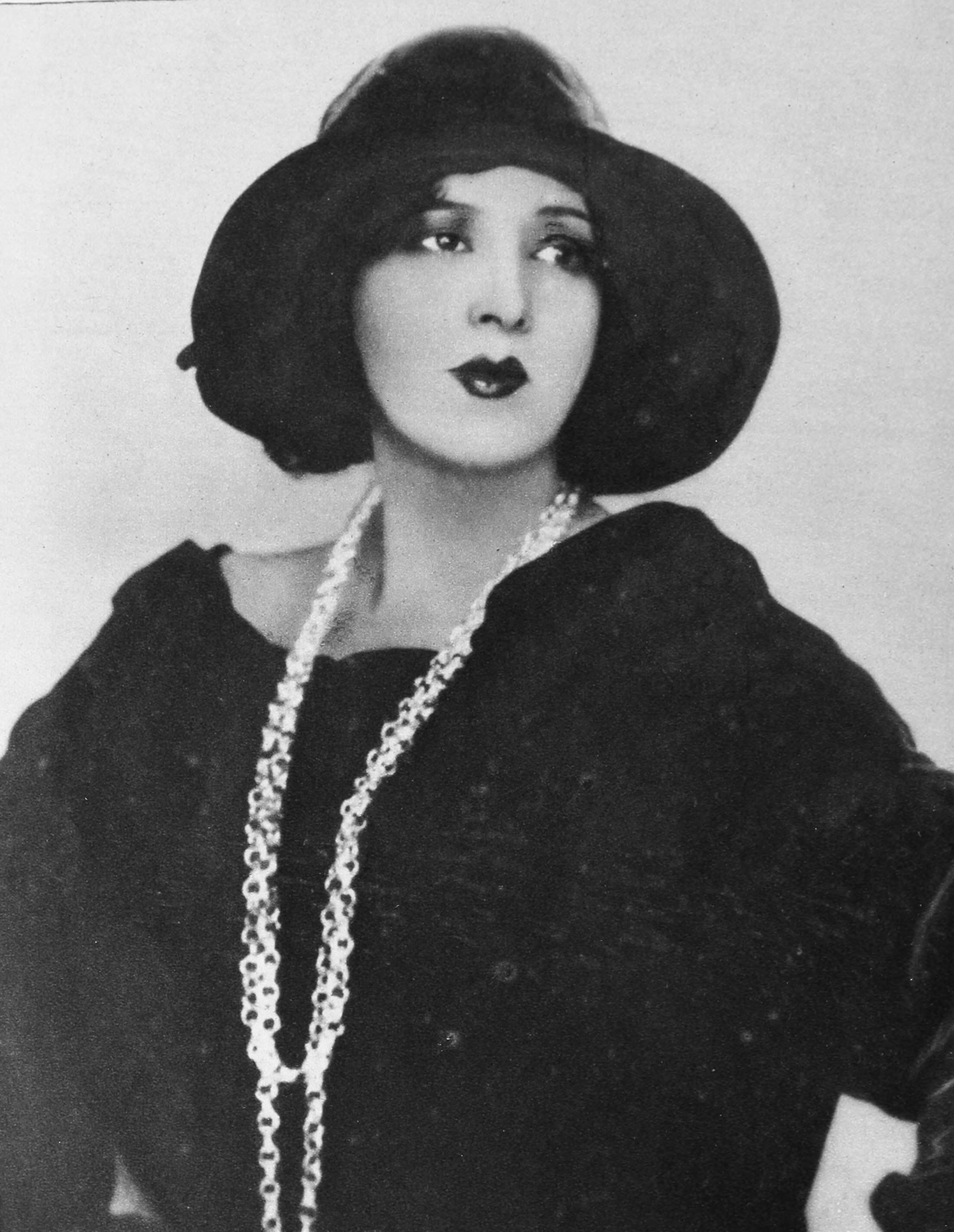
Taylor in 1929

Taylor made her Broadway stage début in George V. Hobart's Come-On, Charlie, which opened on April 8, 1919, at 48th Street Theatre in New York City. The story was about a shoe clerk who has a dream in which he inherits one million dollars and must make another million within six months. It was not a great success and closed after sixteen weeks. Taylor, the only person in the play who wore red beads, was praised by a New York City critic who wrote, "The only point of interest in the show was the girl with the red beads." During the play's run, producer Adolph Klauber saw Taylor's performance and said to the play's leading actress Aimee Lee Dennis: "You know, I think Miss Taylor should go into motion pictures. That's where her greatest future lies. Her dark eyes would screen excellently." Dennis told Taylor what Klauber said, and Taylor began looking for work in films. With the help of J. Gordon Edwards, she got a small role in the film A Broadway Saint (1919). She was hired by the Vitagraph Company for a role with Corinne Griffith in The Tower of Jewels (1920), and also played William Farnum's leading lady in The Adventurer (1920) for the Fox Film Corporation.

One of Taylor's early successes was in 1920 in Fox's While New York Sleeps with Marc McDermott. Charles Brabin directed the film, and Taylor and McDermott play three sets of characters in different time periods. This film was lost for decades, but has been recently discovered and screened at a film festival in Los Angeles. Her next film for Fox, Blind Wives (1920), was based on Edward Knoblock's play My Lady's Dress and reteamed her with director Brabin and co-star McDermott. William Fox then sent her to Fox Film's Hollywood studios to play a supporting role in a Tom Mix film. Just before she boarded the train for Hollywood, Brabin gave her some advice: "Don't think of supporting Mix in that play. Don't play in program pictures. Never play anything but specials. Mr. Fox is about to put on Monte Cristo. You should play the part of Mercedes. Concentrate on that role and when you get to Los Angeles, see that you play it."

Taylor traveled with her mother, her canary bird, and her bull terrier, Winkle. She was excited about playing Mercedes and reread Alexandre Dumas' The Count of Monte Cristo on the train. When she arrived in Hollywood, she reported to Fox Studios and introduced herself to director Emmett J. Flynn, who gave her a copy of the script, but warned her that he already had another actress in mind for the role. Flynn offered her another part in the film, but she insisted on playing Mercedes and after much conversation was cast in the role. John Gilbert played Edmond Dantès in the film, which was eventually titled Monte Cristo (1922). Taylor later said that she, "saw then that he [Gilbert] had every requisite of a splendid actor." The New York Herald critic wrote, "Miss Taylor was as effective in the revenge section of the film as she was in the first or love part of the screened play. Here is a class of face that can stand a close-up without becoming a mere speechless automaton."

Fox also cast her as Gilda Fontaine, a "vamp", in the 1922 remake of the 1915 Fox production A Fool There Was, the film that made Theda Bara a star. Robert E. Sherwood of Life magazine gave it a mixed review and observed: "Times and movies have changed materially since then [1915]. The vamp gave way to the baby vamp some years back, and the latter has now been superseded by the flapper. It was therefore a questionable move on Mr. Fox's part to produce a revised version of A Fool There Was in this advanced age." She played a Russian princess in the film Bavu (1923), a Universal Pictures production with Wallace Beery as the villain and Forrest Stanley as her leading man.

=== Paramount Pictures (1923–1924) ===
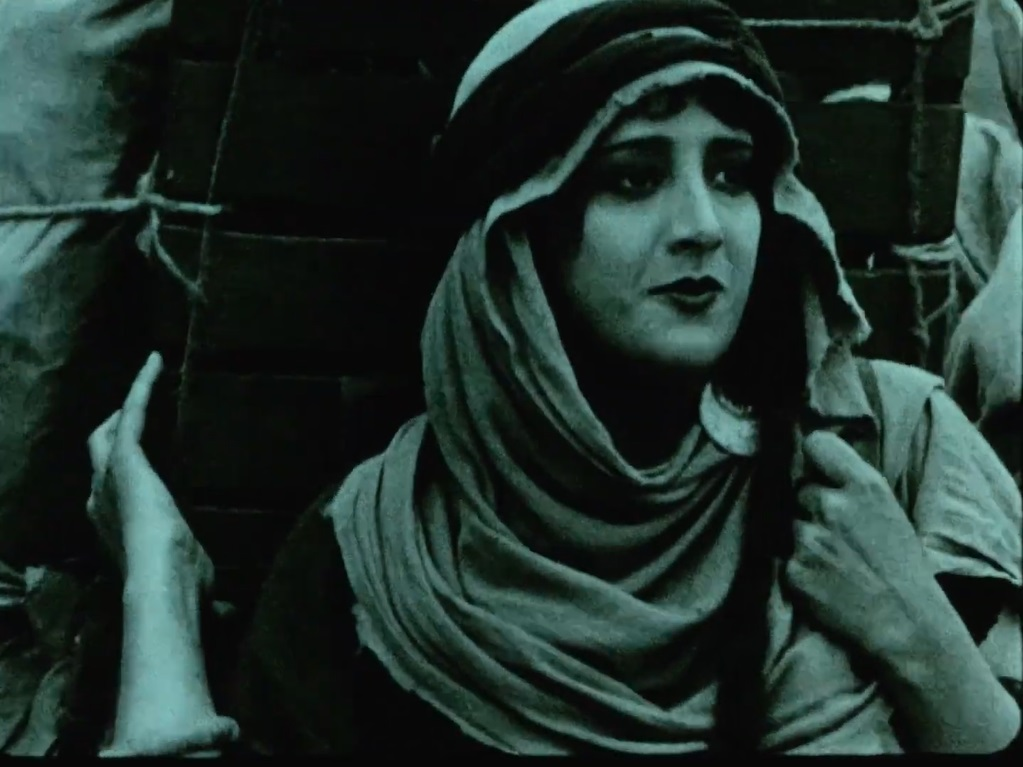
Taylor as Moses' sister Miriam in The Ten Commandments (1923)

One of her most memorable roles is that of Miriam, the sister of Moses (portrayed by Theodore Roberts), in the biblical prologue of Cecil B. DeMille's The Ten Commandments (1923), one of the most successful films of the silent era. Her performance in the DeMille film was considered a great acting achievement. Taylor's younger sister, Helen, was hired by Sid Grauman to play Miriam in the Egyptian Theatre's onstage prologue to the film.

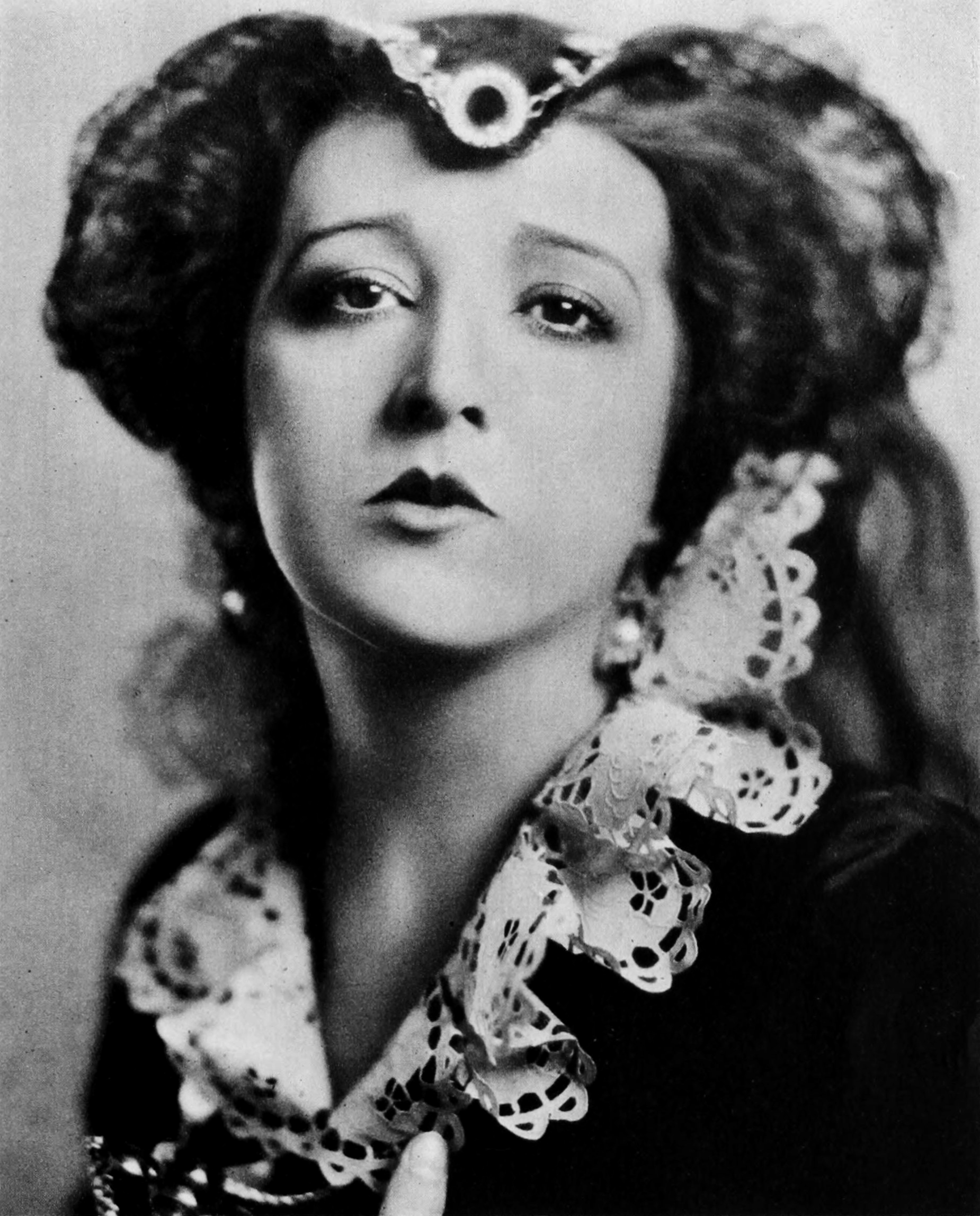
Taylor as Mary, Queen of Scots, from Stars of the Photoplay (1924)

Despite being ill with arthritis, she won the supporting role of Mary, Queen of Scots in Dorothy Vernon of Haddon Hall (1924), starring Mary Pickford. "I've since wondered if my long illness did not, in some measure at least, make for realism in registering the suffering of the unhappy and tormented Scotch queen," she told a reporter in 1926.

=== Freelance (1925–1929) ===
In 1925, she and her husband Jack Dempsey starred in an American silent drama film, a cowboy movie titled Manhattan Madness and directed by John McDermott. It was produced by Fine Arts Pictures and distributed through Associated Exhibitors.

She played Lucrezia Borgia in Don Juan (1926), Warner Bros.' first feature-length film with synchronized Vitaphone sound effects and musical soundtrack. The film also starred John Barrymore, Mary Astor and Warner Oland. Variety praised her characterization of Lucrezia: "The complete surprise is the performance of Estelle Taylor as Lucretia [sic] Borgia. Her Lucretia is a fine piece of work. She makes it sardonic in treatment, conveying precisely the woman Lucretia is presumed to have been."

She was to have co-starred in a film with Rudolph Valentino, but he died just before production was to begin. One of her last silent films was New York (1927), featuring Ricardo Cortez and Lois Wilson.

In 1928, she and husband Dempsey starred in a Broadway play titled The Big Fight, loosely based around Dempsey's boxing popularity, which ran for 31 performances at the Majestic Theatre.

She made a successful transition to sound films or "talkies." Her first sound film was the comical sketch Pusher in the Face (1929).

=== Sound films and later career (1930–1945) ===
Notable sound films in which she appeared include Street Scene (1931), with Sylvia Sidney; the Academy Award for Best Picture-winning Cimarron (1931), with Richard Dix and Irene Dunne; and Call Her Savage (1932), with Clara Bow.

Taylor returned to films in 1944 with a small part in the Jean Renoir drama The Southerner (released in 1945), playing what journalist Erskine Johnson described as "a bar fly with a roving eye. There's a big brawl and she starts throwing beer bottles." Johnson was delighted with Taylor's reappearance in the film industry: "[Interviewing] Estelle was a pleasant surprise. The lady is as beautiful and as vivacious as ever, with the curves still in the right places." The Southerner was her last film.

== Personal life ==
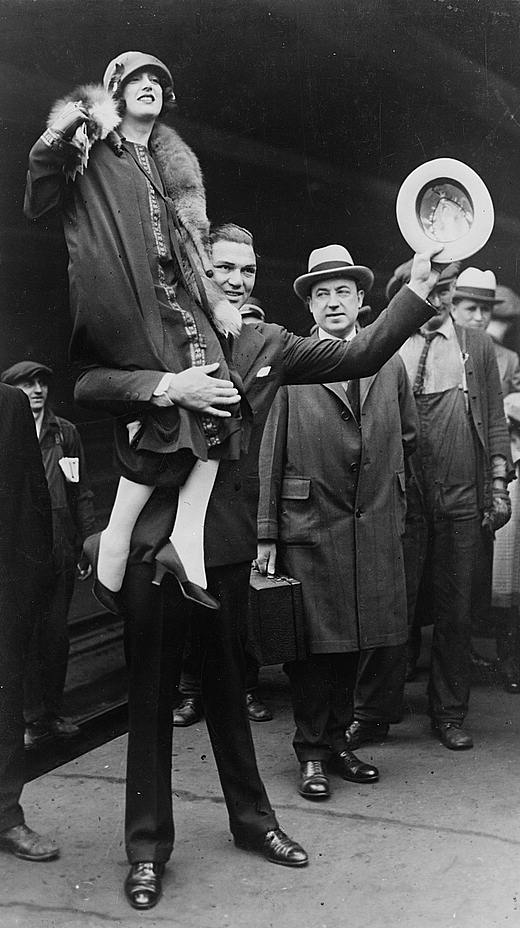
Taylor, on the shoulders of husband, boxer Jack Dempsey (Chicago, 1925)

=== Marriages ===
Taylor married three times, but never had children. In 1911 at age 17, she married a bank cashier named Kenneth Malcolm Peacock, the son of a prominent Wilmington businessman. They lived together for five years and then separated so she could pursue her acting career in New York. Taylor later claimed the marriage was annulled. In August 1924, the press mentioned Taylor's engagement to boxer and world heavyweight champion Jack Dempsey. In September, Peacock announced he would sue Taylor for divorce on the ground of desertion. He denied he would name Dempsey as co-respondent, saying "If she wants to marry Dempsey, it is all right with me." Taylor was granted a divorce from Peacock on January 9, 1925.

Taylor and Dempsey were married on February 7, 1925, at First Presbyterian Church in San Diego, California. They lived in Los Feliz, Los Angeles. Her marriage to Dempsey ended in divorce on September 21, 1931.

Her third husband was theatrical producer Paul Small. Of her last husband and their marriage, she said: "We have been friends and Paul has managed my stage career for five years, so it seemed logical that marriage should work out for us, but I'm afraid I'll have to say that the reason it has not worked out is incompatibility."

=== Animal rights activism ===
In her later years, Taylor devoted her free time to her pets and was known for her work as an animal rights activist. "Whenever the subject of compulsory rabies inoculation or vivisection came up," wrote the United Press, "Miss Taylor was always in the fore to lead the battle against the measure." She was the president and founder of the California Pet Owners' Protective League, an organization that focused on finding homes for pets to prevent them from going to local animal shelters. In 1953, Taylor was appointed to the Los Angeles City Animal Regulation Commission, which she served as vice president.

== Death ==
Taylor died of cancer at her home in Los Angeles on April 15, 1958, at the age of 63. The Los Angeles City Council adjourned that same day "out of respect to her memory." Ex-husband Jack Dempsey said, "I'm very sorry to hear of her death. I didn't know she was that ill. We hadn't seen each other for about 10 years. She was a wonderful person." Her funeral was held on April 17 in Pierce Bros. Hollywood Chapel. She was interred at Hollywood Memorial Park Cemetery.

She was survived by her mother, Ida "Bertha" Barrett Boylan; her sister, Helen Taylor Clark; and a niece, Frances Iblings. She left an estate of more than $10,000, most of it to her family and $200 for the care and maintenance of her three dogs, which she left to her friend Ella Mae Abrams.

== Legacy ==
Taylor was known for her dark features and for the sensuality she brought to the films in which she appeared. Gossip columnist Erskine Johnson considered her "the screen's No. 1 oomph girl of the 20s." For her contribution to the motion picture industry, Estelle Taylor was awarded a star on the Hollywood Walk of Fame at 1620 Vine Street in Hollywood, California.

== Awards ==
- One of Photoplay's Best Performances of the Month (June 1929) for Where East Is East
- One of Screenland's Ten Best Portrayals of the Month (November 1931) for Street Scene

== Film portrayal ==
In the 1983 American television biopic Dempsey, Estelle Taylor was portrayed by British actress Victoria Tennant.

== Filmography ==
Year	Title	Role	Notes
1919	A Broadway Saint	The Parisian	Lost film;
1919	The Golden Shower	Helen	Lost film
1920	The Adventurer	Maritana	Lost film
1920	The Revenge of Tarzan	Countess de Coude	Extant
1920	While New York Sleeps	A Wife / The Vamp / The Girl	Extant
1920	Blind Wives	Anne / Annie / Annette	Extant
1920	The Tower of Jewels	Adele Warren	Lost film
1921	Footfalls	Peggy Hawthorne	Lost film
1922	A Fool There Was	Gilda Fontaine	Lost film
1922	Monte Cristo	Mercedes, Countess de Morcerf	Extant
1922	The Lights of New York	Mrs. George Burton	Lost film
1922	Only a Shop Girl	Mame Mulvey	Lost film
1922	Thorns and Orange Blossoms	Rosita Mendez	Extant
1922	A California Romance	Donna Dolores	Lost film
1923	Bavu	Princess Annia	Lost film
1923	Mary of the Movies	Herself	Incomplete; uncredited
1923	Forgive and Forget	Mrs. Cameron	Incomplete
1923	Desire	Madalyn Harlan	Lost film
1923	The Ten Commandments	Miriam, The Sister of Moses	Extant
1924	Phantom Justice	'Goldie' Harper	Incomplete
1924	Dorothy Vernon of Haddon Hall	Mary, Queen of Scots	Extant
1924	Tiger Love	Marcheta	Lost film
1924	Passion's Pathway	Dora Kenyon	Lost film
1924	The Alaskan	Mary Standish	Lost film
1924	Playthings of Desire	Gloria Dawn	Extant
1925	Manhattan Madness	The Girl	Extant
1925	Wandering Footsteps	Helen Maynard	Extant
1926	Don Juan	Lucrezia Borgia	Extant
1927	New York	Angie Miller	Lost film
1928	The Whip Woman	Sari	Lost film
1928	Honor Bound	Evelyn Mortimer	Extant
1928	Lady Raffles	Lady Raffles	Extant
1928	The Wreck of the Singapore	Daisy	Lost film
1929	Pusher in the Face		Short film; sound debut
1929	Where East Is East	Mme. de Sylva	
1930	Liliom	Mme. Muscat	
1931	Cimarron	Dixie Lee	
1931	Street Scene	Mrs. Anna Maurrant	
1931	The Unholy Garden	Eliza Mowbray	
1932	Western Limited	Doris	
1932	Call Her Savage	Ruth Springer	
1935	Frisco Kid	Undetermined role	Uncredited
1939	Bachelor Mother	Undetermined role	Uncredited
1945	The Southerner	Lizzie	
