= How to Marry a Millionaire (soundtrack) =

How To Marry a Millionaire: Original Motion Picture Soundtrack

Soundtrack album by Alfred Newman and Cyril Mockridge
- Released: March 15, 2001
- Recorded: 1953
- Genre: Soundtrack; orchestral; score
- Length: 69:08
- Label: Film Score Monthly
- Producer: Lukas Kendall, Nick Redman

How To Marry a Millionaire: Original Motion Picture Soundtrack is the official soundtrack album for the 1953 20th Century-Fox film How to Marry a Millionaire. The score was composed and directed by Alfred Newman, with incidental music by Cyril Mockridge. The album was originally released on CD by Film Score Monthly on March 15, 2001, as a limited edition of 3,000 copies, and then it was re-release on January 4, 2005.

== Production ==
The film features an actual overture after the fashion of a live theatrical extravaganza. The 20th Century Fox Orchestra is arrayed before the camera to perform "Street Scene," conducted by Newman. This serves to highlight CinemaScope's new four-track magnetic stereophonic sound system and widescreen visuals. The orchestra appears throughout in wide shots and there are no closeups of any of the players, nor of Newman. At the conclusion of "Street Scene," Newman turns to take a bow before launching into the "Main Title". The orchestra reappears briefly for the "End Title", also an arrangement of "Street Scene".

Newman originally composed "Street Scene" for the film version of Elmer Rice's 1931 play Street Scene, a portrayal of New York (which explains its distinctly Gershwinesque flavor, a la Rhapsody in Blue), and used it in numerous subsequent New York-based films (The Dark Corner, Kiss of Death, Cry of the City, I Wake Up Screaming, How to Marry a Millionaire). Much of the rest of the score for How to Marry a Millionaire consists of similarly familiar, preexisting compositions, including several pieces composed by George Gershwin.

The film's arrangement of Newman's "Street Scene" was performed in 1973 by National Philharmonic Orchestra, conducted by Charles Gerhardt, for the album Captain from Castille – Classic Film Scores of Alfred Newman, accompanied by a booklet in which Page Cook chronicles the background of the piece.

== Release ==
The music soundtrack from How to Marry a Millionaire was first released on CD by Film Score Monthly, as part of Film Score Monthly's series Golden Age Classics, on March 15, 2001, as a limited edition of 3,000 copies, and then it was re-release on January 4, 2005.

The album includes musical direction by Alfred Newman and incidental music by Cyril Mockridge, and was produced by Film Score Monthly's editor-in-chief and executive producer Lukas Kendall alongside producer/director Nick Redman.

The CD of How to Marry a Millionaire features the complete music recorded for the film in stereo including source music and unused cues. The booklet contains complete breakdowns of the songwriters represented and the orchestrators and arrangers utilized.

== Track listing ==
- All music composed and conducted by Alfred Newman.

No.	Title	Length
1.	"20th Century-Fox Fanfare"	0:15
2.	"Street Scene"	5:36
3.	"New York"	2:26
4.	"Brookman/Girls on the Roof"	4:00
5.	"Disappearing Furniture/Failing Plans"	1:16
6.	"The First Prospect"	2:47
7.	"How About You"	2:27
8.	"Hanley"	2:53
9.	"I've Got a Feelin' You're Foolin'/Dream Sequence"	4:09
10.	"Lovely Lady/Sweet and Lovely"	4:52
11.	"You'll Never Know/Empty Apartment"	1:31
12.	"Hanley and Schatze"	4:28
13.	"Skiing/Eben's Land"	3:04
14.	"Denmark Returns"	1:27
15.	"Eben and Loco"	2:29
16.	"Brookman and Schatze"	2:38
17.	"Hanley Returns/I Know Why (and So Do You)/Loco's Beau"	3:43
18.	"I'm Making Believe/Pola's Beau"	2:31
19.	"Hanley's Good Deed"	4:57
20.	"End Title"	0:23

Bonus Material
No.	Title	Length
21.	"Selling Grand Piano"	0:08
22.	"Bachelorette Pad (damaged)"	2:49
23.	"Samba de Rio"	2:38
24.	"Millionaire Dance"	2:43
25.	"Bridal Chorus"	0:29
26.	"George Washington Bridge"	0:05
27.	"New York (instrumental)"	2:24
Total length:		69:08

== Credits and personnel ==
=== Personnel ===
- Conductor – Alfred Newman, Lionel Newman
- Orchestra Manager – Simon Waronker

=== Instruments and musicians ===
- Violin – Victor Arno, Sol Babitz, Israel Baker, Robert Barene, George Berres, Henry Camusi, Joachim Chassman, Dave Crocov, Adolph DiTullio, Peter Ellis, David Frisina, Benny Gill, Anatol Kaminsky, Murray Kellner, Eugene Lamas, Marvin Limonick, Paul Lowenkron, Marion McKinstry, Marshall Moss, Irma W. Neumann, Alex Pierce, Joseph Quadri, David Selmont, Paul C. Shure, Felix Slatkin
- Viola – Edgardo A. Acosta, Myer Bello, Donald A. Cole, Joseph DiFiore, Alvin Dinkin, Louis Kievman, Alex Neiman, Robert Ostrowsky, Sven Reher
- Cello – Joseph Coppin, Joseph DiTullio, Armand Kaproff, Raphael "Ray" Kramer, Leonard Krupnick, Kurt Reher, Harold Schneier
- Bass – Abraham Luboff, Peter A. Mercurio, C. Magdelano Rivera, Meyer (Mike) Rubin, Alex Walden
- Flute – Luella Howard, Barbara Moore, Sterling D. Smith
- Oboe – Arnold Koblentz, William Kosinski, Gordon Pope
- Clarinet – Russell Cheever, Charles Gentry, Arthur Herfurt, Glen Johnston, Edward R. Miller, Abe Most, Ted Nash, Babe Russin, William A. Ulyate
- Bassoon – Don Christlieb, Arthur Fleming, Glen Johnston
- French Horn – Alfred Brain, Wendell Hoss, Sinclair Lott, Alan I. Robinson, Harry Schmidt, Claude Eugene "Gene" Sherry
- Trumpet – Frank Beach, John Clyman, Jack R. Coleman, Conrad Gozzo, Manny Stevens
- Trombone: Daniel D. Cerilly, Marlo Imes, Ray Klein, John Tranchitella, Lloyd E. Ulyate
- Tuba – Clarence Karella
- Piano – Urban Thielmann, Raymond Turner
- Organ – Chauncey Haines
- Guitar – Vito Mumolo
- Harp – Anne Stockton (Mason)
- Drums – Richard Cornell, Paul DeDroit, Edgar Forrest, Preston Lodwick, Cameron Maus, Harold L. "Hal" Rees

Credits and personnel adapted from the record label's official website.
