= Abe Most =

American clarinetist, saxophonist and flutist (1920–2002)

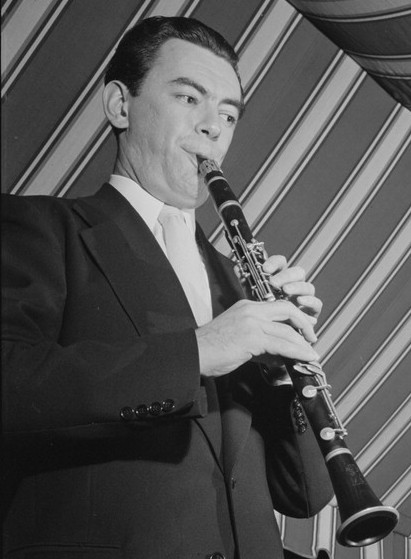

Background information
- Born: Abraham Most; February 27, 1920; New York City
- Died: October 10, 2002 (aged 82) Los Angeles
- Genres: Jazz, swing
- Occupation: Musician
- Instrument: Clarinet
- Years active: 1930s–1980s

Abe Most (February 27, 1920 – October 10, 2002) was a swing clarinetist, alto saxophonist and flutist who is known for his performances and recordings of the works of Artie Shaw and Benny Goodman. He began his career in 1939 as a member of Les Brown's big band. After serving three years in the US Army during World War II from 1942-1945, he became a member of Tommy Dorsey's big band.

Most made a few albums with smaller labels, including Superior (1946), Trend (1954), Annunciata (1978) and Camard (1984). His last two albums were Abe Most Live! (1994) and I Love You Much Too Much (2007). He was a studio musician for seven decades, playing on albums by Earth, Wind & Fire, Ted Gärdestad, Dick Haymes, Joni Mitchell, Randy Newman, and Dory Previn among others. He can also be heard playing on the soundtrack of the film How to Marry a Millionaire. He is the older brother of jazz musician Sam Most.

== Discography ==
=== As leader ===
- Mister Clarinet (Liberty, 1955)
- Swing Low Sweet Clarinet (Camard, 1984)
- Live! (Camard, 1995)

=== As sideman ===
With Les Brown

- Sunday, Out of Nowhere (Columbia, 1944)
- The Les Brown Story (Capitol, 1959)
- The Uncollected Les Brown and His Orchestra 1949 Vol. 2 (Hindsight, 1978)

With Dominic Frontiere

- Dom Frontiere Sextet (Liberty, 1955)
- Fabulous!! (Liberty, 1956)

With Henry Mancini

- Mancini Concert (RCA Victor, 1971)
- Hangin' Out (RCA Victor, 1974)

With others

- Van Alexander, The Home of Happy Feet (Capitol, 1959)
- Laurindo Almeida, New Directions (Crystal Clear, 1979)
- Cher, Stars (Warner Bros., 1975)
- Ray Conniff, Friendly Persuasion (CBS/Columbia, 1964)
- Craig Doerge, Craig Doerge (Columbia, 1973)
- The Dorsey Brothers, The Fabulous Dorsey Brothers 1946 (Sunbeam, 1975)
- Earth, Wind & Fire, All 'n All (Columbia, 1977)
- Ted Gardestad, Blue Virgin Isles (Polar, 1978)
- B.B. King, Midnight Believer (ABC, 1978)
- Peggy Lee, Mirrors (A&M, 1975)
- Jakob Magnusson, Special Treatment (Warner Bros., 1979)
- Johnny Mandel, I Want to Live (United Artists, 1958)
- Freddy Martin, Salute to the Smooth Bands Vol. 2 (Capitol, 1964)
- Carmen McRae, Can't Hide Love (Blue Note, 1976)
- Liza Minnelli, New York, New York (United Artists, 1977)
- Joni Mitchell, Hejira (Asylum, 1976)
- Maria Muldaur, Waitress in a Donut Shop (Reprise, 1974)
- Lyle Murphy, 12-Tone Compositions & Arrangements (Contemporary, 1955)
- Randy Newman, Sail Away (Reprise, 1972)
- Dave Pell, The Big Small Bands (Capitol, 1960)
- Dory Previn, Reflections in a Mud Puddle, Taps Tremors and Time Steps (United Artists, 1971)
- George Shearing, Out of the Woods (Capitol, 1964)
- Paul Smith, Liquid Sounds Part 2 (Capitol, 1954)
- John Williams, 1941 (Arista, 1979)
