= How to Marry a Millionaire =

1953 film by Jean Negulesco

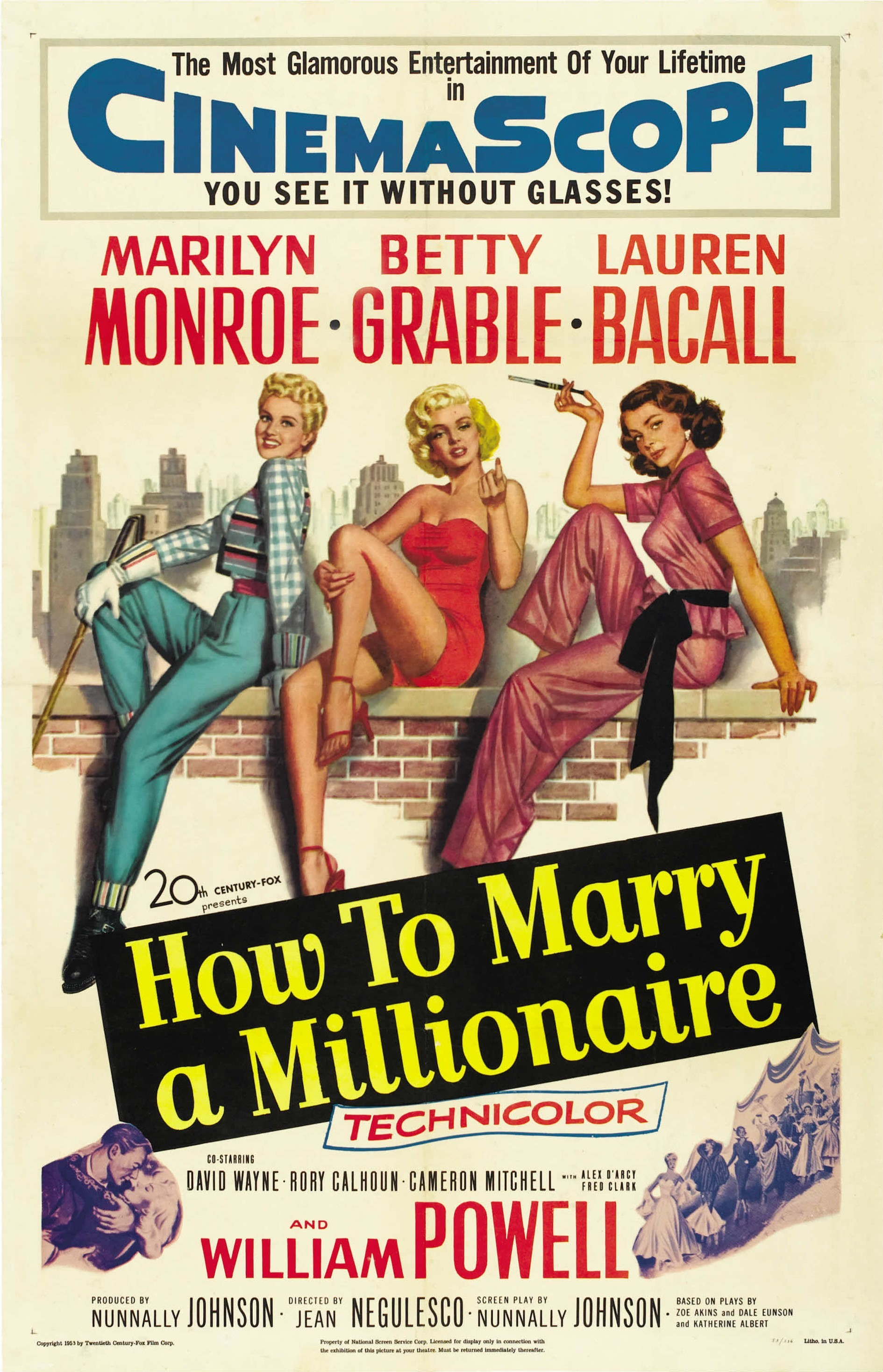
- Theatrical release poster
- Directed by: Jean Negulesco
- Screenplay by: Nunnally Johnson
- Based on: The Greeks Had a Word for It by Zoe Akins; Loco by Dale Eunson Katherine Albert
- Produced by: Nunnally Johnson
- Starring: Marilyn Monroe; Betty Grable; Lauren Bacall; David Wayne; Rory Calhoun; Cameron Mitchell; Alex D'Arcy; Fred Clark; William Powell
- Cinematography: Joe MacDonald
- Edited by: Louis Loeffler
- Music by: Alfred Newman (direction); Cyril Mockridge (incidental music)
- Production company: 20th Century-Fox
- Distributed by: 20th Century-Fox
- Release date: November 5, 1953
- Running time: 95 minutes
- Country: United States
- Language: English
- Budget: $1.9 million
- Box office: $8 million

How to Marry a Millionaire is a 1953 American romantic comedy film directed by Jean Negulesco and written and produced by Nunnally Johnson. The screenplay by Johnson was based on the plays The Greeks Had a Word for It (1930) by Zoe Akins and Loco (1946) by Dale Eunson and Katherine Albert.

The film stars Marilyn Monroe, Betty Grable, and Lauren Bacall as three fashionable Manhattan models, along with David Wayne, Rory Calhoun, Cameron Mitchell, and William Powell as their wealthy marks.

Produced and distributed by 20th Century-Fox, How to Marry a Millionaire was the studio's first film to be shot in the new CinemaScope widescreen sound process, although it was the second CinemaScope film released by Fox after the biblical epic film The Robe (also 1953). It was also the first color and CinemaScope film ever shown on prime-time network television (though panned-and-scanned) when it was presented as the first film on NBC's Saturday Night at the Movies on September 23, 1961.

The soundtrack to How to Marry a Millionaire was released on CD by Film Score Monthly on March 15, 2001.

== Plot ==
Monroe as Pola, Grable as Loco, and Bacall as Schatze

Resourceful Schatze Page, ditzy Loco Dempsey, and near-sighted Pola Debevoise are three women on a mission: each wants to marry a millionaire. To accomplish this task, they rent a luxurious Sutton Place penthouse in New York City from Freddie Denmark (who is avoiding the Internal Revenue Service (IRS) by living in Europe) and together hatch a plot to court the city's elite. On the day they move in, Loco arrives with Tom Brookman, who had purchased her groceries for her because she "forgot her pocketbook". Tom shows interest in Schatze, but she dismisses him, stating that "The first rule is, gentlemen callers have got to wear a necktie" and, instead, sets her sights on the charming, classy, rich widower J.D. Hanley. While courting the older J.D., she initially fends off Tom's continued attempts to win her over. Eventually, she agrees to several dates, but after every date, she insists she never wants to see him again.

Meanwhile, Loco meets grumpy businessman Walter Brewster. He is married, but she agrees to accompany him to his lodge in Maine, thinking it is a convention hall of the Elks Club. As Loco discovers her mistake, she comes down with the measles and is quarantined. Upon recovering, while Brewster is now bedridden with measles, she begins seeing the forest ranger, Eben Salem. When Salem indicates the huge expanse of forested land he is responsible for, saying "this is all mine", Loco mistakenly believes he is a wealthy landowner instead of a state employee overseeing acres of forestlands. Later discovering the truth, she is disappointed and tells Brewster about it on the drive back to New York.

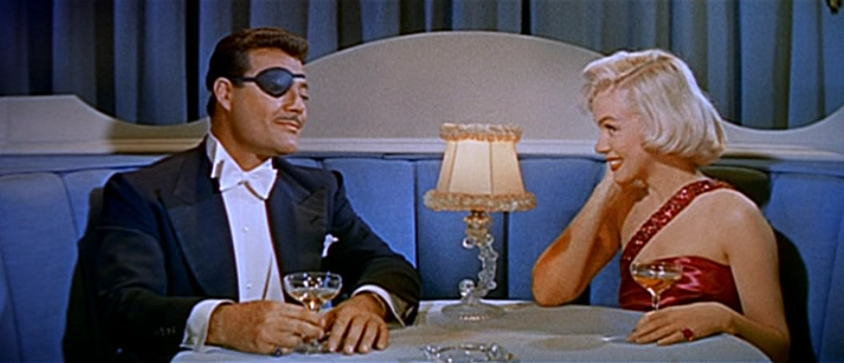
Pola is romanced by a phony tycoon, played by Alexander D'Arcy

Pola is myopic but hates wearing glasses in the presence of men. She falls for a phony oil tycoon, J. Stewart Merrill, unaware that he is a crooked speculator. When she intends to take a plane from LaGuardia Airport to meet him in Atlantic City, she ends up on a plane to Kansas City. On the plane, she encounters Freddie Denmark again, having unknowingly met him when he had entered his apartment to retrieve documents to prove that his crooked accountant stole his money and left him in trouble with the IRS. Freddie also wears glasses and encourages Pola to wear hers as well. They fall quickly in love and get married.

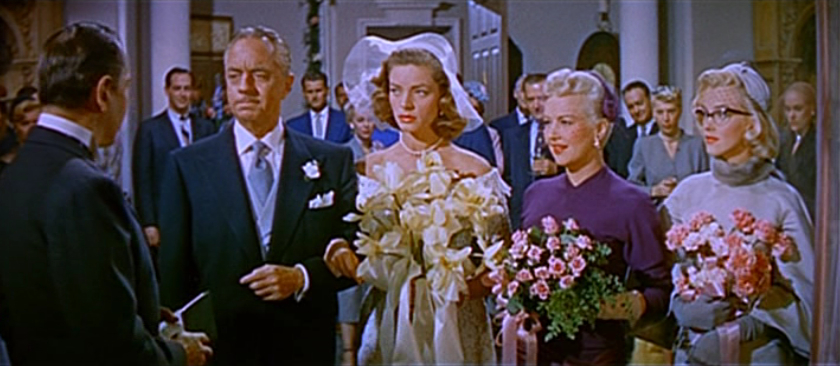
William Powell as J.D. Hanley prepares to marry Schatze, with Loco and Pola as bridesmaids

Loco and Pola are reunited with Schatze just before her wedding to J.D. Hanley. Schatze is unable to go through with the marriage and confesses to J.D. that she loves Tom. J.D. agrees to call off the ceremony. Tom is among the wedding guests and the two reconcile and marry.

Afterwards, the three happy couples end up at a greasy spoon diner. Schatze jokingly asks Eben and Freddie about their financial prospects, which are slim. When she finally gets around to Tom, he casually admits a net worth of around $200 million, which no one takes seriously. He then calls for the check, and pulls out an enormous wad of money, paying with a $1,000 bill and telling the chef to keep the change. The three astonished women faint and crash to the floor, and the men drink a toast to their unconscious wives.

== Cast ==
- Betty Grable as Loco Dempsey
- Marilyn Monroe as Pola Debevoise
- Lauren Bacall as Schatze Page
- David Wayne as Freddie Denmark
- Rory Calhoun as Eben Salem
- Cameron Mitchell as Tom Brookman
- Alex D'Arcy as J. Stewart Merrill
- Fred Clark as Waldo Brewster
- William Powell as J. D. Hanley

== Production ==
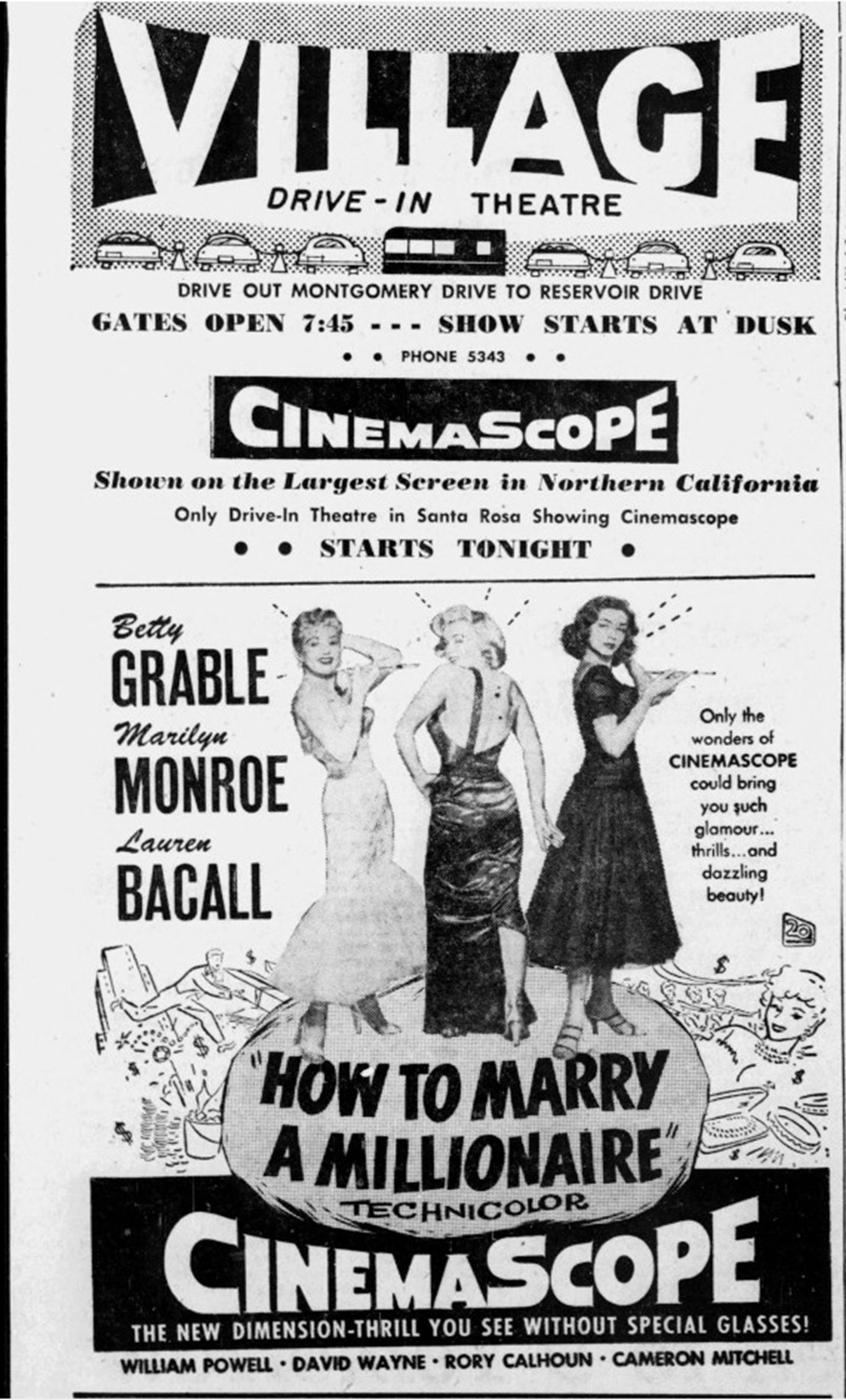
Drive-in advertisement from 1954

Nunnally Johnson, who adapted the screenplay from two different plays, produced the picture.

20th Century-Fox started production on The Robe before it began How to Marry a Millionaire. Although the latter was completed first, the studio chose to present The Robe as its first CinemaScope picture in late September or early October 1953 because it felt the family-friendly The Robe would attract a larger audience to its new widescreen process.

The film's cinematography was by Joseph MacDonald. The costume design was by Travilla.

=== Portrayal of New York ===
Between scenes, the cinematography has some iconic color views of mid-20th century New York City: Rockefeller Center, Central Park, the United Nations Building, and Brooklyn Bridge in the opening sequence following the credits. Other iconic views include the Empire State Building, the lights of Times Square at night, the George Washington Bridge, and the Statue of Liberty.

=== Music ===
A song extolling the virtues of New York follows the Gershwin-like music used for the title credits, after an elaborate five-minute pre-credit sequence showcasing a 70-piece orchestra conducted by Alfred Newman before the curtain goes up.

The score for How to Marry a Millionaire was one of the first recorded for film in stereo. It was composed and directed by Alfred Newman, with incidental music by Cyril Mockridge, and orchestrated by Edward B. Powell. The album was released on CD by Film Score Monthly on March 15, 2001 as part of their series Golden Age Classics.

The film's theatrical version begins with a nearly six-minute overture of Newman's symphonic piece "Street Scene", which he wrote in the style of George Gershwin. It is played on-screen by an 80-piece studio orchestra (billed as "The Twentieth Century Fox Symphony Orchestra") exploiting the film's widescreen format. Newman wrote the piece for the 1931 film Street Scene, which featured his first complete film score.

== Release ==
How to Marry a Millionaire premiered at the Fox Wilshire Theatre (now the Saban Theatre), in Beverly Hills, California on November 4, 1953.

== Reception ==
=== Box office ===
The film earned $8 million worldwide and $7.5 million domestically, second that year only to The Robe. It was the fourth highest-grossing film of 1953, whereas Monroe's previous feature, Gentlemen Prefer Blondes, was seventh.

=== Critical reaction ===
Bosley Crowther of The New York Times wrote "the substance is still insufficient for the vast spread of screen which CinemaScope throws across the front of the theatre, and the impression it leaves is that of nonsense from a few people in a great big hall." William Brogdon of Variety praised the three female leads and wrote the film is "a solid comedy that would click even without the anamorphic filming," as well as Negulesco's direction which "builds a smart, entertaining show about three models on the prowl for millionaires." Harrison's Reports wrote the film should be "a box-office natural from all angles — presentation, story, cast, direction, production values, Technicolor photography and, above all, entertainment values that will register strongly with the great mass of movie-goers."

Philip K. Scheuer of the Los Angeles Times wrote: "Negulesco's direction is in faultless taste and the girls make an ultra decor for his Technicolored settings. I was pleased to note that Miss Monroe held her own, in comic ability, with her more experienced companions." Kate Cameron of the New York Daily News wrote the film "is a comical play, which would have been delightfully entertaining no matter how it had been photographed or projected. But, the CinemaScope treatment does enhance the production values of the picture enormously and when the action moves out of a stage-like setting, the backgrounds become startlingly realistic and, in some instances, breathtakingly beautiful." Time magazine wrote the film was "a light comedy devoted to a close inspection of three famous girls" and acknowledged the CinemaScope anamorphic process "can do the comic about as well as it can the epic."

On the review aggregator website Rotten Tomatoes, 81% of 27 critics' reviews are positive, with an average rating of 7/10.

=== Award nominations ===
Award	Category	Subject	Result
Academy Awards	Best Costume Design – Color	Charles LeMaire and William Travilla	Nominated
British Academy Film Awards	Best Film from any Source	How to Marry a Millionaire	Nominated
Writers Guild of America Awards	Best Written American Comedy	Nunnally Johnson	Nominated

== Television adaptation ==
In 1957, the film was adapted into a sitcom also titled How to Marry a Millionaire. It starred Barbara Eden (as Loco Jones), Merry Anders (Michelle "Mike" Page), Lori Nelson (Greta Lindquist) and as Nelson's later replacement, Lisa Gaye as Gwen Kirby. It aired in syndication for two seasons.

== Remake ==
In 2000, 20th Century Fox Television produced a made-for-TV remake, How to Marry a Billionaire: A Christmas Tale. It reversed the sex roles, and had three men looking to marry wealthy women. It starred John Stamos, Joshua Malina and Shemar Moore.

In 2007, Nicole Kidman bought the rights to How to Marry a Millionaire under her production company Blossom Films, intending to produce and possibly star in a remake.
