= The Whip Woman =

1928 film

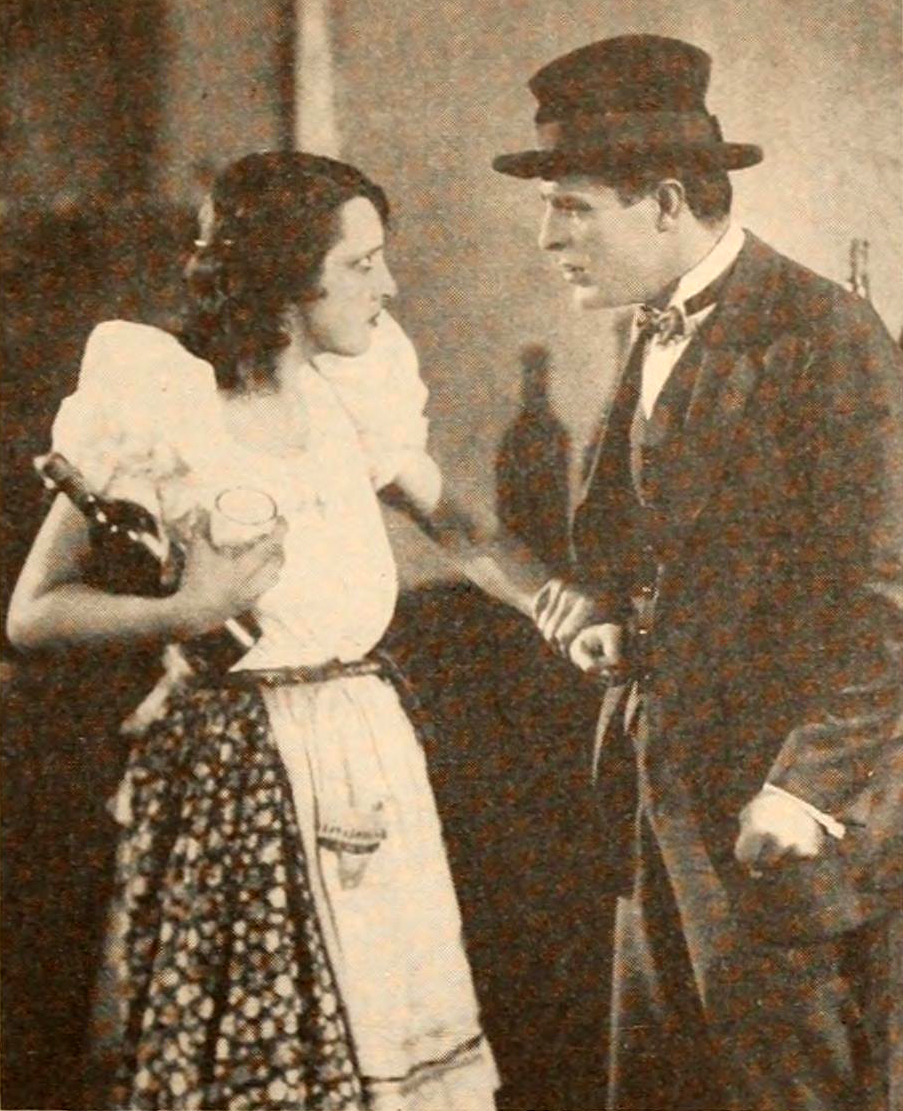
- Estelle Taylor and Antonio Moreno in a still.
- Directed by: Joseph C. Boyle
- Written by: Forrest Halsey (story); Leland Hayward (story)
- Produced by: Allan Dwan; Robert Kane
- Starring: Estelle Taylor; Hedda Hopper; Antonio Moreno; Lowell Sherman; Loretta Young
- Cinematography: Ernest Haller
- Edited by: Terrell Morse (aka Terry O. Morse)
- Distributed by: First National Pictures
- Release date: February 5, 1928
- Running time: 60 minutes
- Country: United States
- Language: Silent (English intertitles)

The Whip Woman is a lost 1928 American silent film produced and distributed by First National Pictures and directed by Joseph C. Boyle. The film starred Estelle Taylor, Antonio Moreno, Hedda Hopper and Lowell Sherman. Supporting actors including fifteen-year-old Loretta Young.

== Plot ==
Sari, the titular whip-wielding woman, is a Hungarian peasant who intervenes to prevent Count Michael Ferrenzi from committing suicide. The grateful Count wants to marry Sari, but his aristocratic mother tries to stop their wedding. Sari and the Count are eventually wed despite the circumstances.

== Cast ==
- Estelle Taylor as Sari
- Antonio Moreno as Count Michael Ferenzi
- Lowell Sherman as Baron
- Hedda Hopper as Countess Ferenzi
- Julanne Johnston as Madame Haldane
- Loretta Young as The Girl
