= The Lights of New York =

1922 film directed by Charles Brabin

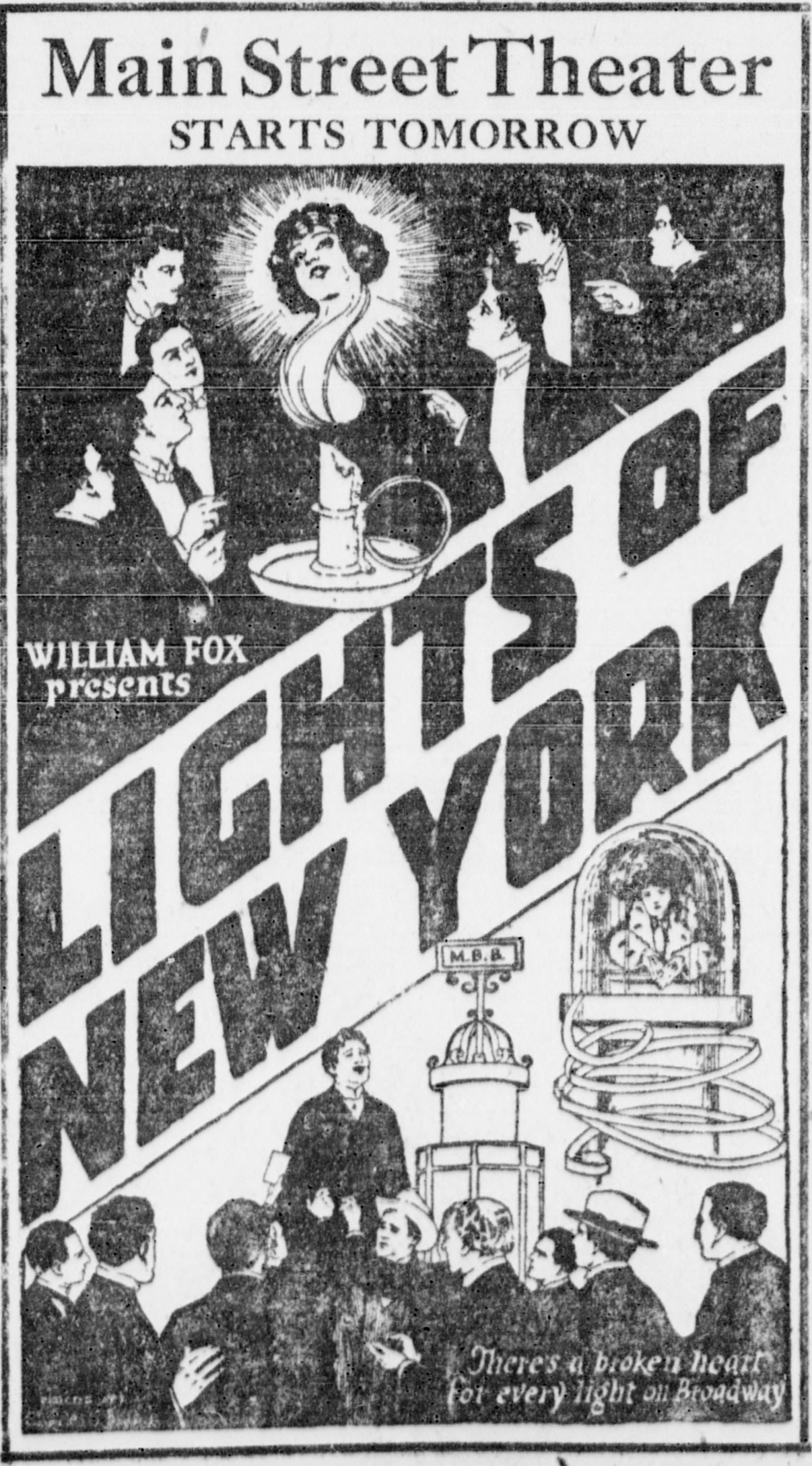
- Contemporary advertisement
- Directed by: Charles Brabin
- Written by: Charles Brabin
- Produced by: William Fox
- Starring: Clarence Nordstrom; Margaret Seddon; Frank Currier
- Cinematography: George W. Lane
- Production company: Fox Film Corporation
- Distributed by: Fox Film Corporation
- Release date: November 12, 1922
- Running time: 60 minutes
- Country: United States
- Languages: Silent; English intertitles

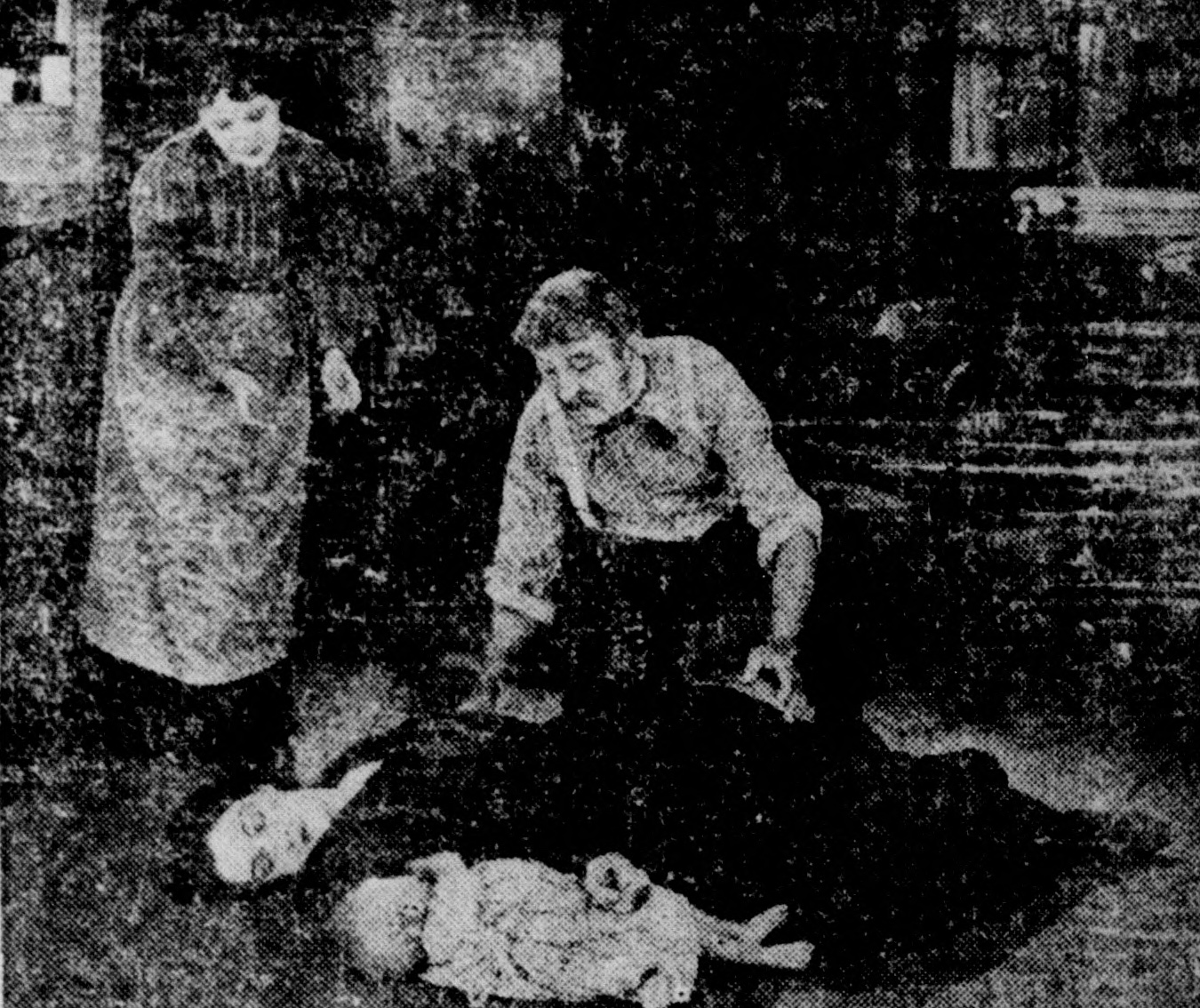
Publicity photo

The Lights of New York is a 1922 American silent drama film directed by Charles Brabin and starring Clarence Nordstrom, Margaret Seddon and Frank Currier.

== Cast ==
- Clarence Nordstrom as Robert Reid
- Margaret Seddon as Mrs. Reid
- Frank Currier as Daniel Reid
- Florence Short as Mary Miggs
- Charles K. Gerrard as Jim Slade
- Marc McDermott as Charles Redding
- Estelle Taylor as Mrs. George Burton

== Bibliography ==
- Solomon, Aubrey. The Fox Film Corporation, 1915-1935: A History and Filmography. McFarland, 2011.
