= Bavu =

1923 film by Stuart Paton

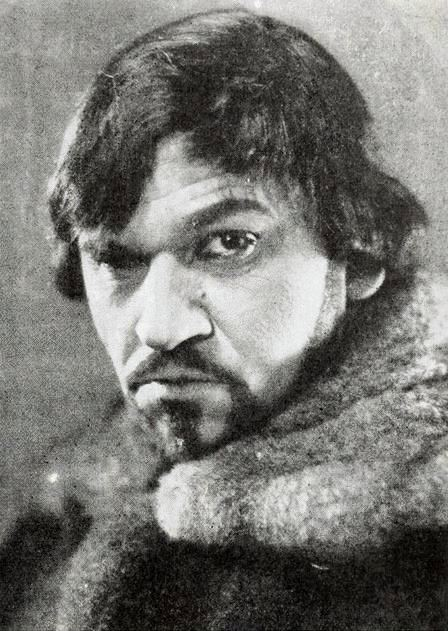
- Wallace Beery as Bavu
- Directed by: Stuart Paton
- Written by: Raymond L. Schrock; Albert Kenyon
- Based on: The Attic of Felix Bavu by Earl Carroll
- Produced by: Carl Laemmle
- Starring: Wallace Beery
- Cinematography: Allen M. Davey
- Distributed by: Universal Pictures
- Release date: May 7, 1923
- Running time: 8 reels
- Country: United States
- Language: Silent (English intertitles)

Bavu is a 1923 silent American drama film directed by Stuart Paton, starring Wallace Beery in the title role, and written by Albert Kenyon and Raymond L. Schrock based upon a play by Earl Carroll. The film is a period piece involving Bolsheviks and the Russian Revolution.

== Plot ==
According to the Motion Picture News: A Russian revolutionist incites the peasantry to burn the city. Mischka, a former servant in the nobelman's home, is commissioner of licenses under the new administration. He loves the princess and in order to get her out of the country it is necessary to have the passport sealed with the revolutionist's ring. A fight follows, but Mischka escapes with the girl while Bavu drowns in the pursuit.

== Cast ==
- Wallace Beery as Felix Bavu
- Estelle Taylor as Princess Annia
- Forrest Stanley as Mischka Vleck
- Sylvia Breamer as Olga Stropik
- Josef Swickard as Prince Markoff
- Nick De Ruiz as Kuroff
- Martha Mattox as Piplette
- Harry Carter as Shadow
- Jack Rollens as Michael Revno

== Preservation ==
With no prints of Bavu found in any film archives, it is a lost film.
