= Charles Brabin =

British-American film director (1882–1957)

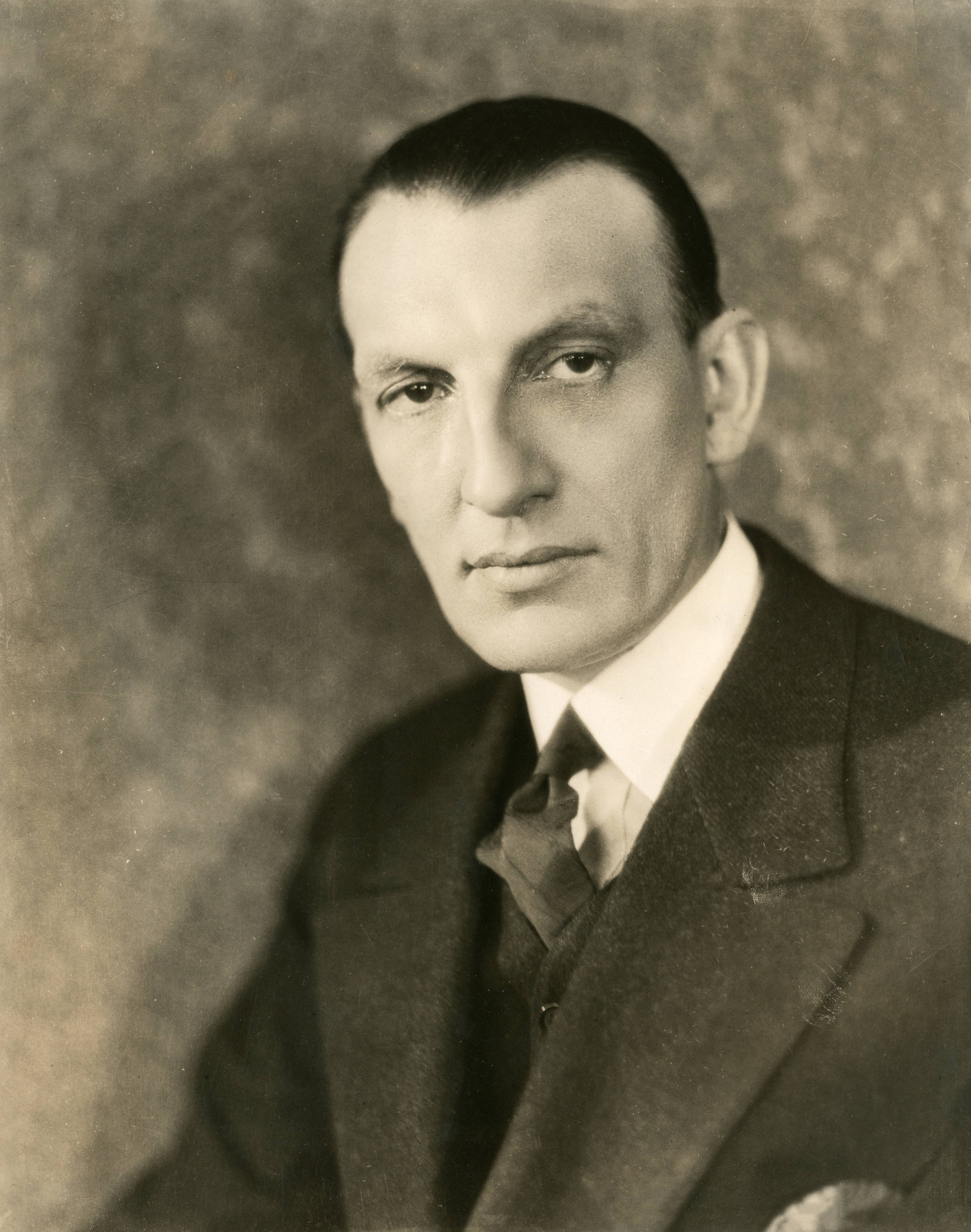
- Brabin in 1923
- Born: April 17, 1882; Liverpool, England
- Died: November 3, 1957 (aged 75); Santa Monica, California, U.S.
- Resting place: Forest Lawn Memorial Park
- Education: St Francis Xavier's College, Liverpool
- Occupation: Film director
- Years active: 1909–1934
- Spouses: Suzan Jeanette Mosher (m. 1913; div. 1920) Theda Bara (m. 1921; died 1955)
- Relatives: Lori Bara (sister-in-law)

Charles Brabin (April 17, 1882 – November 3, 1957) was a British-American film director.

== Biography ==
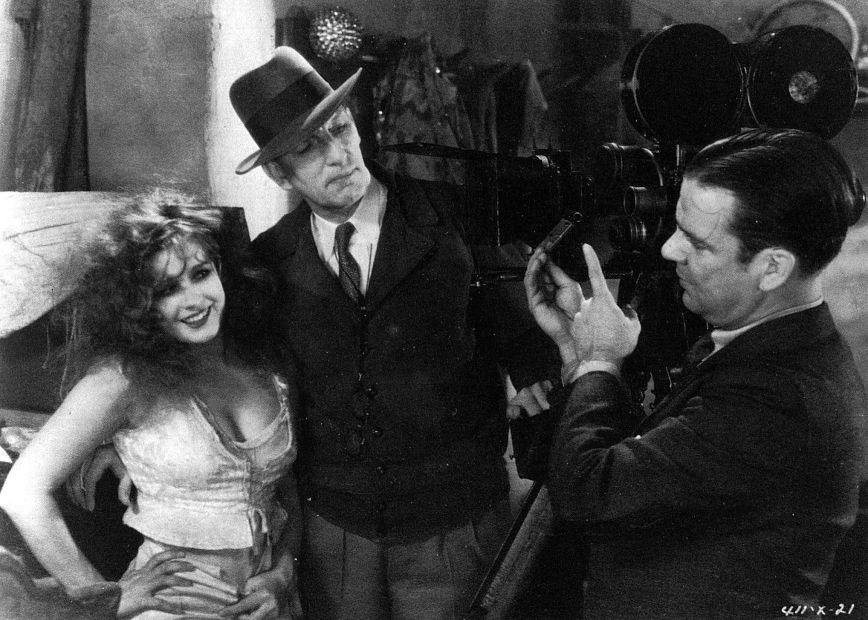
Lili Damita, Charles Brabin, and Merritt B. Gerstad on the set of The Bridge of San Luis Rey (1929) Note the cleavage of the French actress, which later would not be allowed, under the Motion Picture Production Code.

Born in Liverpool, England, he was educated at St. Francis Xavier College. Brabin sailed to New York City in the early 1900s and, while holding down odd jobs there, he tried his hand as a stage actor. He joined the Edison Manufacturing Company around 1908, first acting, later writing and directing. He was active during the silent era, then pursued a short-lived career in talkies. His last film was A Wicked Woman for Metro-Goldwyn-Mayer in 1934.

Brabin married, firstly, to socialite Suzan Jeanette Mosher, daughter of Edwin Howard Mosher and Jennie Slater Mosher, of New York City. They married on December 14, 1913, at Bedford Congregational Church in The Bronx, New York, shortly after Brabin returned from a trip to England and Europe. Brabin's best friend, screen actor Marc McDermott, served as best man. Charles and Suzan Brabin remained married for seven years.

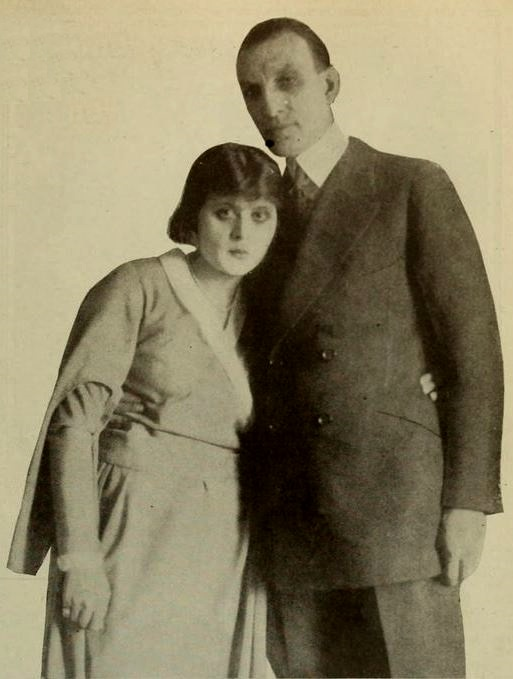
Theda Bara and Charles Brabin (1922)

Brabin later wed silent-film "vamp" star Theda Bara July 2, 1921, remaining married to her until her death from abdominal cancer on April 7, 1955.

== Partial filmography ==
The following are some of Brabin's films.

- A Soldier's Duty (1912)
- What Happened to Mary (1912, 12-episode serial)
- An Unsullied Shield (1913)
- The Man Who Disappeared (serial, 1914)
- The Midnight Ride of Paul Revere (film) (1914)
- The Raven (1915)
- The Price of Fame (1916)
- That Sort (1916)
- The Adopted Son (1917)
- Red, White and Blue Blood (1917)
- The Sixteenth Wife (1917)
- Babette (1917)
- Mary Jane's Pa (1917)
- His Bonded Wife (1918)
- The Poor Rich Man (1918)
- Breakers Ahead (1918)
- Social Quicksands (1918)
- A Pair of Cupids (1918)
- Buchanan's Wife (1918)
- Kathleen Mavourneen (1919)
- La Belle Russe (1919)
- Thou Shalt Not (1919)
- While New York Sleeps (1920)
- Blind Wives (1920)
- Footfalls (1921)
- The Lights of New York (1922)
- The Broadway Peacock (1922)
- Six Days (1923)
- Driven (1923)
- So Big (1924)
- Stella Maris (1925)
- Ben-Hur (1925, uncredited)
- Mismates (1926)
- Twinkletoes (1926)
- Framed (1927)
- Hard-Boiled Haggerty (1927)
- The Valley of the Giants (1927)
- Burning Daylight (1928)
- The Bridge of San Luis Rey (1929)
- The Ship from Shanghai (1929)
- Call of the Flesh (1930)
- The Great Meadow (1931)
- Sporting Blood (1931)
- The Beast of the City (1932)
- The Mask of Fu Manchu (1932)
- Rasputin and the Empress (1932)
- Stage Mother (1933)
- A Wicked Woman (1934)

== Archive ==
Outtakes from Brabin's 1925 version of Stella Maris survive and were preserved by the Academy Film Archive in 2016.
