= Footfalls (film) =

1921 film by Charles Brabin

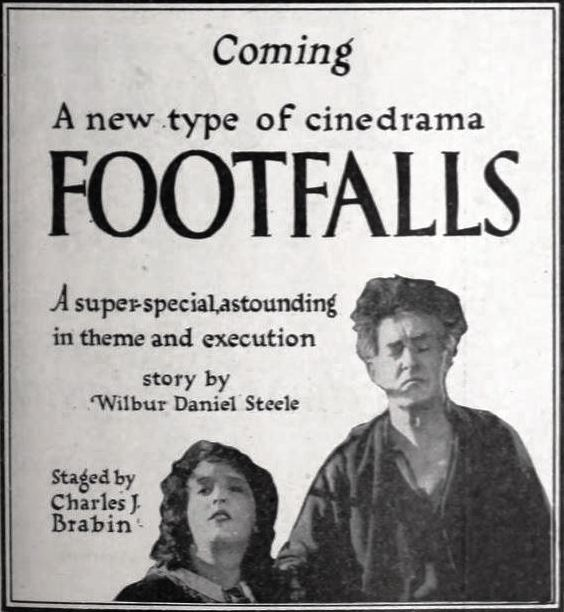
- Advertisement
- Directed by: Charles Brabin
- Written by: Charles Brabin
- Based on: Footfalls by Wilbur Daniel Steele
- Produced by: William Fox
- Starring: Tyrone Power Sr.
- Cinematography: George W. Lane
- Distributed by: Fox Film Corporation
- Release date: September 8, 1921
- Running time: 8 reels
- Country: United States
- Language: Silent (English intertitles)

Footfalls is a lost 1921 American silent mystery film directed by Charles Brabin and starring Tyrone Power Sr. that was based upon the short story Footfalls by Wilbur Daniel Steele writing in Tower of Sand and Other Stories. It was produced and distributed by Fox Film Corporation.

== Cast ==
- Tyrone Power Sr. as Hiram Scudder
- Tom Douglas as Tommy Scudder
- Estelle Taylor as Peggy Hawthorne
- Gladden James as Alec Campbell
