= Street Scene (film) =

1931 American pre-Code drama film by King Vidor

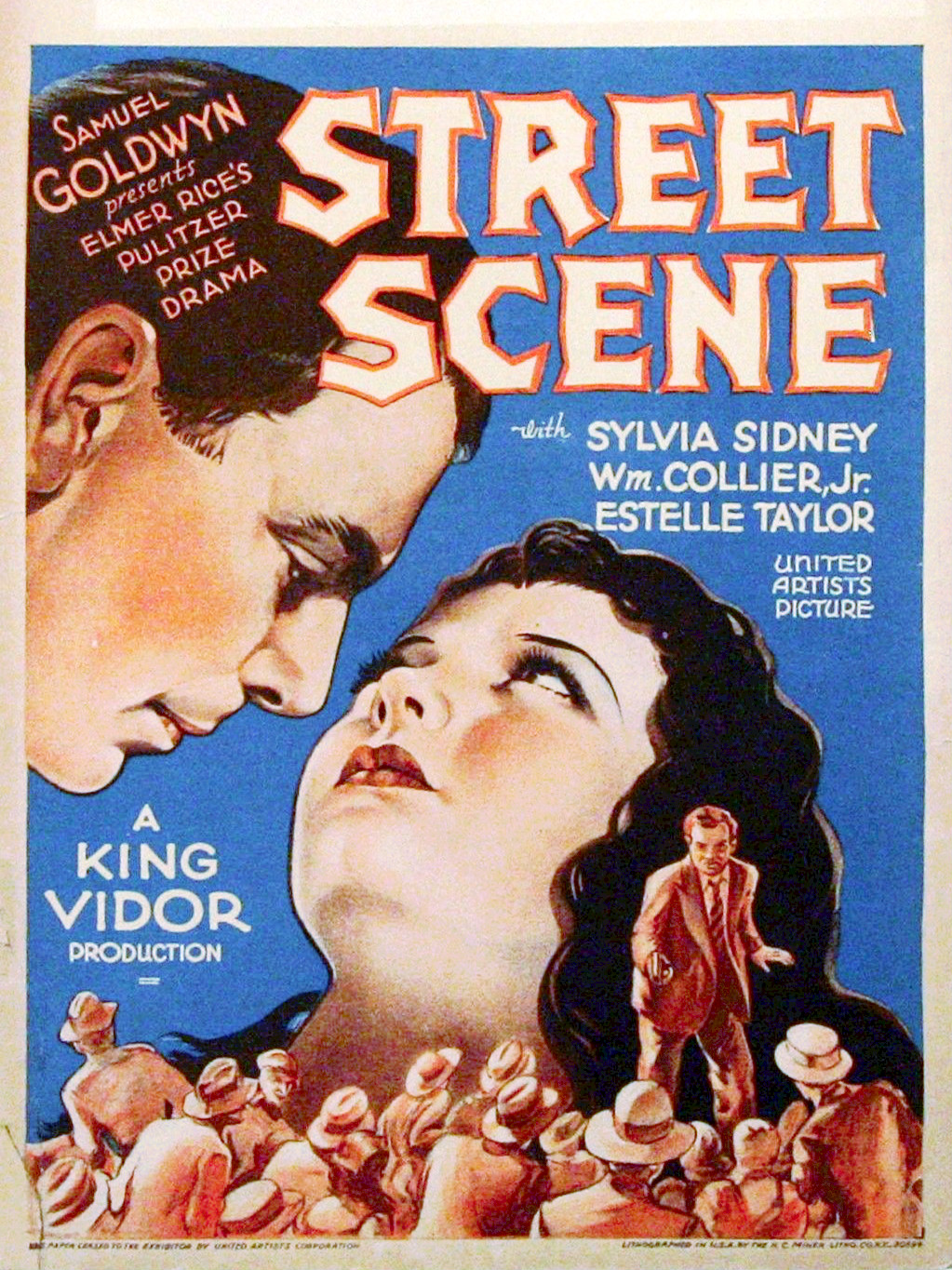
- movie poster
- Directed by: King Vidor
- Written by: Elmer Rice (play and screenplay)
- Based on: Street Scene (1929 play) by Elmer Rice
- Produced by: Samuel Goldwyn
- Starring: Sylvia Sidney; William Collier Jr. Estelle Taylor
- Cinematography: George Barnes; Gregg Toland
- Edited by: Hugh Bennett
- Music by: Alfred Newman
- Production company: Samuel Goldwyn Productions
- Distributed by: United Artists
- Release dates: August 26, 1931 (New York City); September 5, 1931 (U.S. wide)
- Running time: 80 minutes
- Country: United States
- Language: English
- Budget: $584,000 (estimate)

Street Scene is a 1931 American pre-Code drama film produced by Samuel Goldwyn and directed by King Vidor. With a screenplay by Elmer Rice adapted from his Pulitzer Prize-winning play of the same name, Street Scene takes place on a New York City street from one evening until the following afternoon. Except for one scene which takes place inside a taxi, Vidor shot the entire film on a single set depicting half a city block of house fronts.

The film stars Estelle Taylor, David Landau, Sylvia Sidney, William Collier Jr., and Beulah Bondi (her screen debut). The music score is by Alfred Newman, his first complete film score. Newman composed the title theme, in the style of George Gershwin's Rhapsody in Blue. The theme has been used in other movies, including Cry of the City, Kiss of Death, I Wake Up Screaming, Where the Sidewalk Ends, The Dark Corner, Gentleman's Agreement and as the overture to How to Marry a Millionaire.

In February 2020, the film was shown at the 70th Berlin International Film Festival, as part of a retrospective dedicated to King Vidor's career.

== Plot ==
On a hot summer evening on the front stoop of a Lower East Side tenement building, Emma Jones gossips with other neighbors about the affair that Mrs. Anna Maurrant and the milkman Steve Sankey are having. When the rude and unfriendly Mr. Frank Maurrant arrives, they change the subject. Meanwhile, their teenage daughter Rose Maurrant is being sexually pressured by her married boss, Mr. Bert Easter. However, Rose very much likes her kind young Jewish neighbor Sam, who has a serious crush on her.

The next morning, Frank Maurrant tells his wife that he is traveling to Stamford on business. Mrs. Maurrant meets the gentle Sankey in her apartment, but out of the blue Frank comes back home. He realizes his wife is upstairs with Sankey, and runs upstairs. We hear shots and see the two men struggling as Sankey tries to escape through the window. Maurrant runs out with a gun. He has killed Sankey and fatally wounded his wife.

Maurrant is apprehended and is led away by police. He apologizes to his daughter Rose, who will now have to take care of herself and her young brother without either parent. Rose's boss offers once again to set her up in her own apartment, but she refuses. Then she sees Sam, and tells him she wants to leave the city. Sam pleads with her to let him go with her, but she tells him it will be better for the two of them to have a couple of years apart before they consider becoming a couple. Rose walks off down the street by herself.

== Cast ==
The cast is listed here in the order shown in the credits:

- Sylvia Sidney as Rose Maurrant
- William Collier Jr. as Sam Kaplan
- Estelle Taylor as Mrs. Anna Maurrant
- Beulah Bondi as Emma Jones
- David Landau as Frank Maurrant
- Matt McHugh as Vincent Jones
- Russell Hopton as Steve Sankey
- Greta Grandstedt as Mae Jones
- Eleanor Wesselhoeft as Marguerite "Greta" Fiorentino
- Allan Fox as Dick McGann
- Nora Cecil as Alice Simpson (welfare worker)
- Margaret Robertson in a minor role
- Walter James as Marshal James Henry
- Max Montor as Abe Kaplan
- Walter Miller as Bert Easter (Rose's boss)
- T.H. Manning as George Jones
- Conway Washburne as Danny Buchanan
- John M. Qualen as Karl Olsen
- Ann Kostant as Shirley Kaplan
- Adele Watson as Olga Olsen
- Lambert Rogers as Willie Maurrant
- George Humbert as Filippo Fiorentino
- Helen Lovett as Laura Hildebrand
- Richard Powell as Officer Harry Murphy
- Jane Mercer in a minor role
- Monti Carter as Monti Carter
- Harry Wallace as Fred Cullen
