= Experian FootFall =

Information service company

FootFall
- Industry: Information services
- Founded: 1991; 35 years ago
- Founders: John Gallagher, Brian Barnes
- Defunct: 2005
- Fate: Purchased by Experian

FootFall Ltd was founded in 1991 by John Gallagher and Brian Barnes. The company initially sold hardware which measured pedestrian flows within UK shopping centres. The company evolved into a provider of information services based on pedestrian flow. FootFall systems are installed in 37 countries with customers primarily in the retail and retail property industries. In December 2005 Experian purchased FootFall Ltd at a cost of 36 million GBP. Experian FootFall is a product of Experian PLC.

Experian sold the company to Tyco International in 2015 for £38.5 million. It now trades as ShopperTrak.
