= While New York Sleeps (1920 film) =

1920 film by Charles Brabin

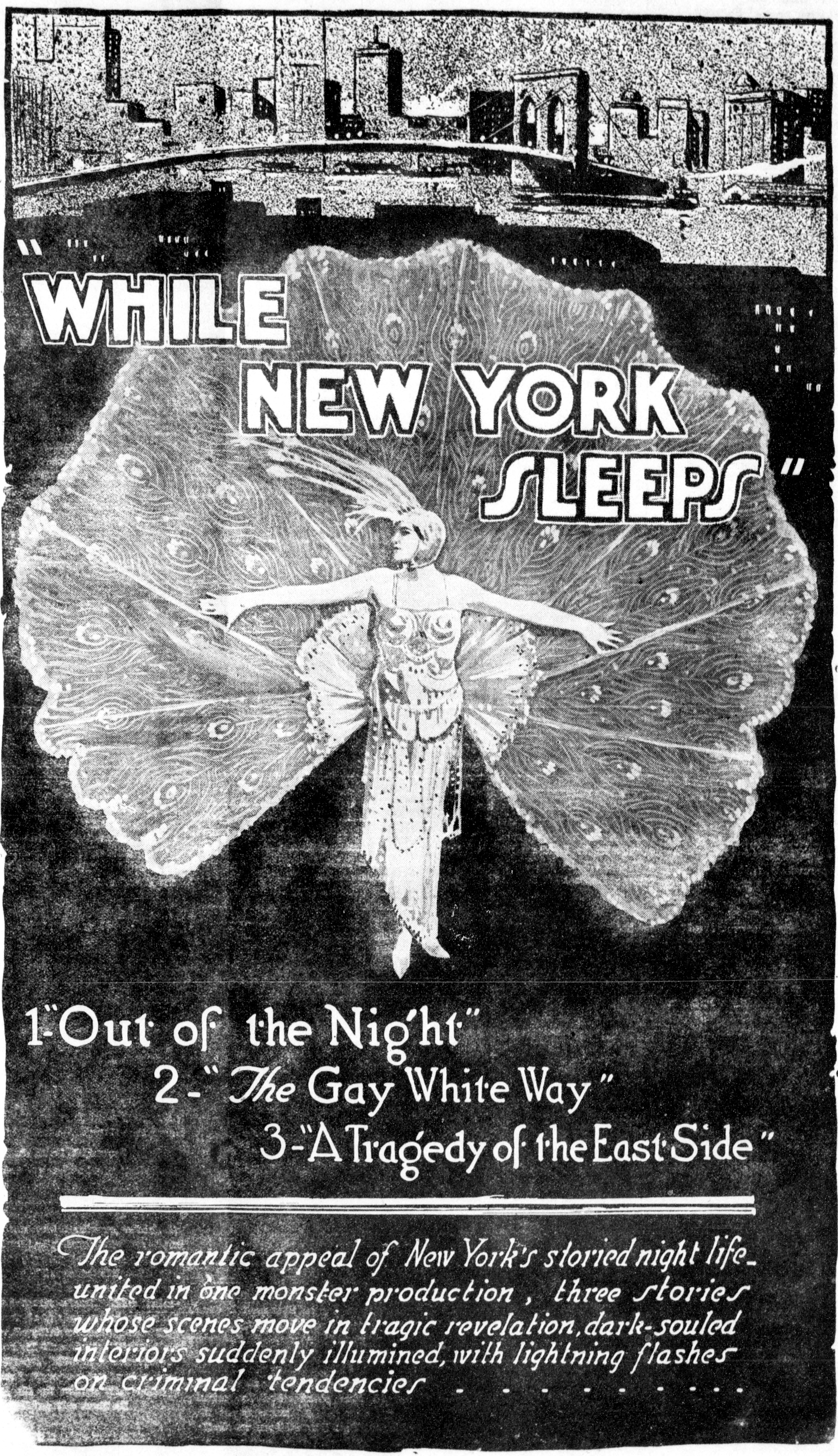
- A poster from a newspaper.
- Directed by: Charles Brabin
- Written by: Charles Brabin; Thomas Fallon
- Produced by: William Fox; Fox Film company
- Cinematography: George W. Lane; Bennie Miggins
- Distributed by: Fox Film Corporation
- Release date: August 23, 1920
- Running time: 8 reels at 7,516 ft.
- Country: United States
- Language: Silent (English intertitles)

While New York Sleeps is a 1920 American crime drama film produced by Fox Film Corporation and directed by Charles Brabin, who was the husband of actress Theda Bara. The film tells three distinct episodic stories using the same actors, Estelle Taylor and Marc McDermott. Long thought to be a lost film like many other Fox Film productions from this period, a copy of this movie is now in the collection of the UCLA Film & Television Archive.

== Plot ==
As described in a film magazine, in the first story a suburban wife has married a wealthy man in the belief that her first husband, a cad, had been killed. While the second husband is away, her first husband appears and demands money for his silence. A struggle ensues after a burglar enters the home to rob it, and the burglar shoots the first husband. The wife, hearing her second husband arriving in his car, takes the revolver in her hand as the burglar escapes, telling her second husband that she shot a burglar (the body of her first husband). The second episode is a recital of the badger game with the vamp, the man, and his friend, and includes a scene depicting the Frolic at Ziegfeld Follies. The third episode involves a tragedy that takes place in New York's Lower East Side.

== Cast ==
- Estelle Taylor as A Wife / The Vamp / The Girl
- William Locke as Her husband
- Marc McDermott as Strange Visitor / The Man / The Paralytic
- Harry Southern as Burglar / Friend / His Son
- Earl Metcalfe as The Gangster

== Reception ==
According to author Aubrey Solomon, this film was Fox's biggest moneymaker for the year 1920 with a profit of $192,000. While this would seem to conflict with the enormous success of Fox's Over the Hill to the Poorhouse (1920), the latter film did not achieve its largest rentals until it went into full release in 1921.
