= Ten Nights in a Bar Room (1921 film) =

1921 film by Oscar Apfel

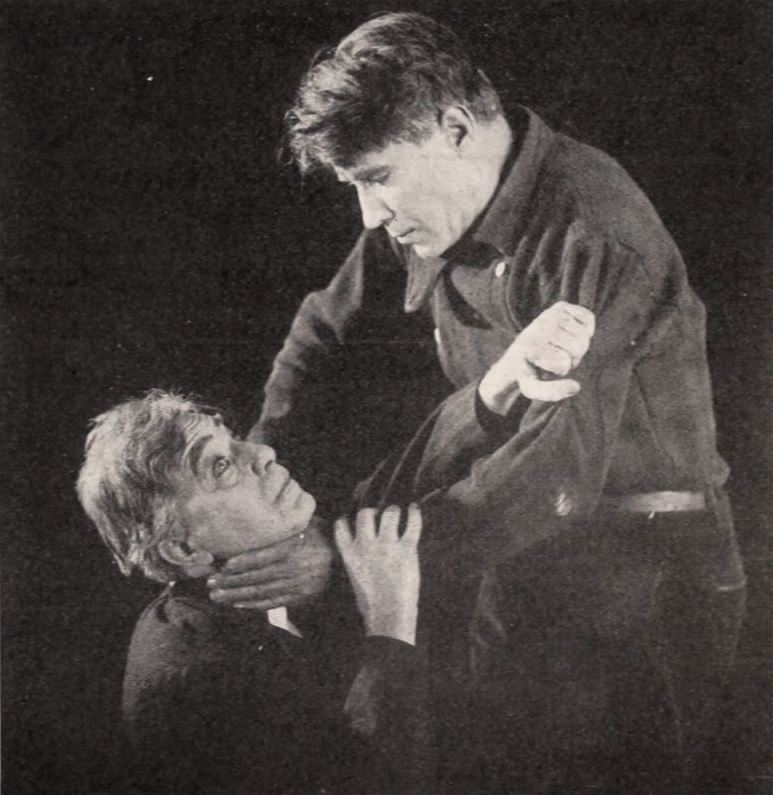
- A still from the film
- Directed by: Oscar Apfel
- Written by: L. Case Russell
- Based on: Ten Nights in a Bar-Room and What I Saw There; 1839 novel by: Timothy Shay Arthur; Ten Nights in a Bar-Room 1858 play; William W. Pratt
- Starring: Baby Ivy Ward; John Lowell; Nell Clarke Keller
- Cinematography: Joseph Settle
- Production company: Blazed Trail Productions
- Distributed by: Arrow Film Corporation
- Release date: December 11, 1921
- Running time: 8 reels
- Country: United States
- Language: Silent (English intertitles)

Ten Nights in a Bar Room is a 1921 American silent melodrama film directed by Oscar Apfel. The film is based on the novel of the same name by Timothy Shay Arthur, and the 1858 stage adaptation of that novel by William W. Pratt.

== Plot ==
Logging camp worker Joe Morgan becomes an alcoholic after a saloon opens up in town. His daughter Mary suffers as a result of this. One day, while Joe is at the saloon, his daughter Mary shows up to ask him to come home. A fight breaks out, and Mary is hit with a glass, killing her. Joe vows for revenge. After a series of misadventures, Joe stops trying to avenge his daughter's death, and he reunites with his wife.

== Cast ==
- Baby Ivy Ward as Little Mary Morgan
- John Lowell as Joe Morgan
- Nell Clarke Keller as Fanny Morgan
- Charles Mackay as Simon Slade
- James Phillips as Frank Slade
- Ethel Dwyer as Dora Slade
- Charles Beyer as Harvey Green
- John Woodford as Judge Hammond
- Kempton Greene as Willie Hammond

== Preservation ==
A complete copy of the film is held by the Library of Congress.
