= Ten Nights in a Bar-Room (1931 film) =

1931 film

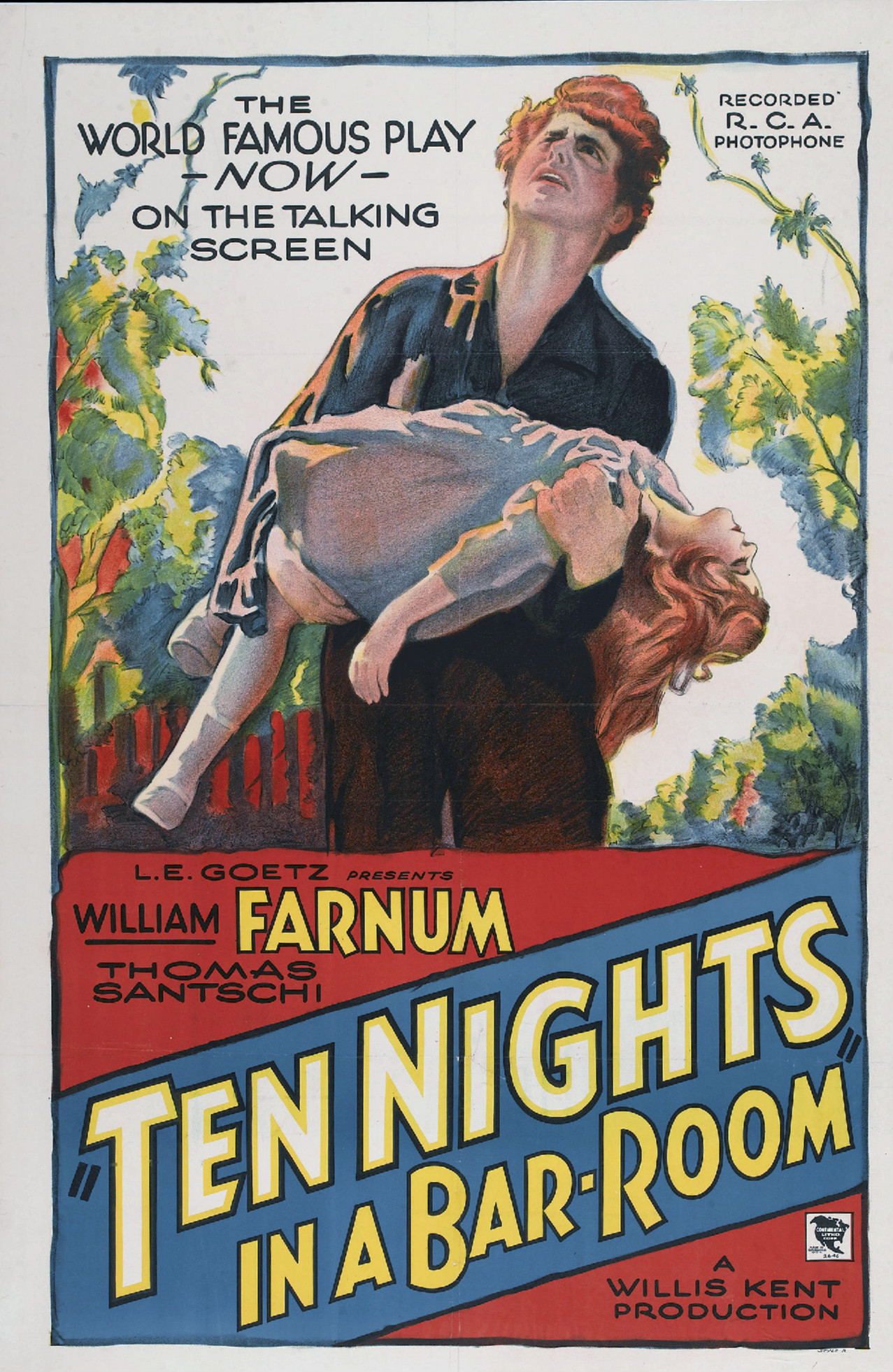
- Film poster
- Directed by: William A. O'Connor
- Written by: Norton S. Parker
- Based on: Ten Nights in a Bar-Room and What I Saw There; 1854 novel by: Timothy Shay Arthur; Ten Nights in a Bar-Room 1858 play; William W. Pratt
- Produced by: L.E. Goetz (producer); Willis Kent (producer)
- Cinematography: Vernon L. Walker
- Edited by: Leon Goetz
- Music by: Louis Katzman
- Production company: Willis Kent Productions
- Distributed by: Astor Pictures
- Release date: March 1, 1931
- Running time: 72 minutes
- Country: United States
- Language: English

Ten Nights in a Bar-Room is a 1931 American Pre-Code film directed by William A. O'Connor. The film is a remake of a 1910 movie and follows the storyline in the 1858 play Ten Nights in a Bar-Room by William W. Pratt adapted from the 1854 novel Ten Nights in a Bar-Room and What I Saw There by Timothy Shay Arthur.

== Plot summary ==
The Cedarville new town doctor, Dr. Romaine, checks into the hotel owned by Simon Slade. Simon's daughter Ann and son John work at the hotel and bar therein. Simon invites Joe Morgan into the bar and many hours later, he arrives home drunk at 1:00 a.m. Grandma Morgan warns her son the risks of drinking. His wife Sarah is angry for their little girl Mary is sick. The doctor says Mary needs bed rest and a better diet.

Joe is the town miller. His mill and job suffers as he frequents the bar more and more. Joe plays poker with the resident bar gambler, Harvey Green. Simon's son John wants to help Joe. Dad is glad to let him lose gambling and running up his bar tab. Joe's work and family suffers. Grandma and Sarah worry and take care of sick Mary.

Six months elapse and Joe is now the bar drunk. He does bring Mary home a doll. Simon cuts Joe off for not paying his tab. Ann Simon delivers a food basket to the Morgan home. Sarah is grateful but grandma is embarrassed accepting charity. Morgan hangs around the bar just waiting for someone to buy a round and he can get a free drink. Simon gets Joe to sign over his mill to settle the bar bill with an extra $100 cash for Joe. Joe drinks and gambles away the cash.

Dr. Simone has been treating Mary. One night he sees drunk Joe and he takes him home. The doctor and Joe work on sobering him up. Joe has been sober for three weeks. He goes to the bar and begs for a drink. Simon refuses and little Mary shows and calls Dad home. Simon throws a beer mug and it hits Mary in the head. Joe carries the limp girl home. Joe goes back to the bar and a huge fist fight ensues. Joe and Simon fight as the other barfly, silent Sam, watches on. Chairs and tables are smashed and mirrors broken. The potbelly stove is knocked over and starts a fire. The bar burns down and little Mary is ok.

== Cast ==
- William Farnum as Joe Morgan
- Tom Santschi as Simon Slade
- Patty Lou Lynd as Mary Morgan
- Robert Frazer as Dr. Romaine
- Phyllis Barrington as Ann Slade
- Rosemary Theby as Sarah Morgan
- Thomas Jefferson as Silent Sam
- Lionel Belmore as Bill-the Bartender
- John Darrow as Frank Slade
- Frank Leigh as Harvey Green
- Sheila Bromley as June Manners
- Fern Emmett as Fanny
- Harry Todd as Sample
- John Uppman as Charlie - Singer
- Hank Bell as Barfly (uncredited)
- Henry Roquemore as Man (uncredited)

== Reception ==
The corollary 1854 novel written by Arthur was a financial success and the second most popular book of the Victorian era. Only Uncle Tom's Cabin sold better. The mood of the country supported the Temperance movement and anti-alcohol sentiment. The prohibition theme was adapted into a 1858 Broadway play by William W. Pratt, a 1901 film, a now lost 1910 silent movie, a 1913 adaption film, a 1921 film directed by Oscar Apfel, and then this 1931 film. There is a 1926 film version where a drunkard is swindled out of his mill business but is later reborn and he runs for mayor.
