= Ten Nights in a Bar Room (1910 film) =

1910 film

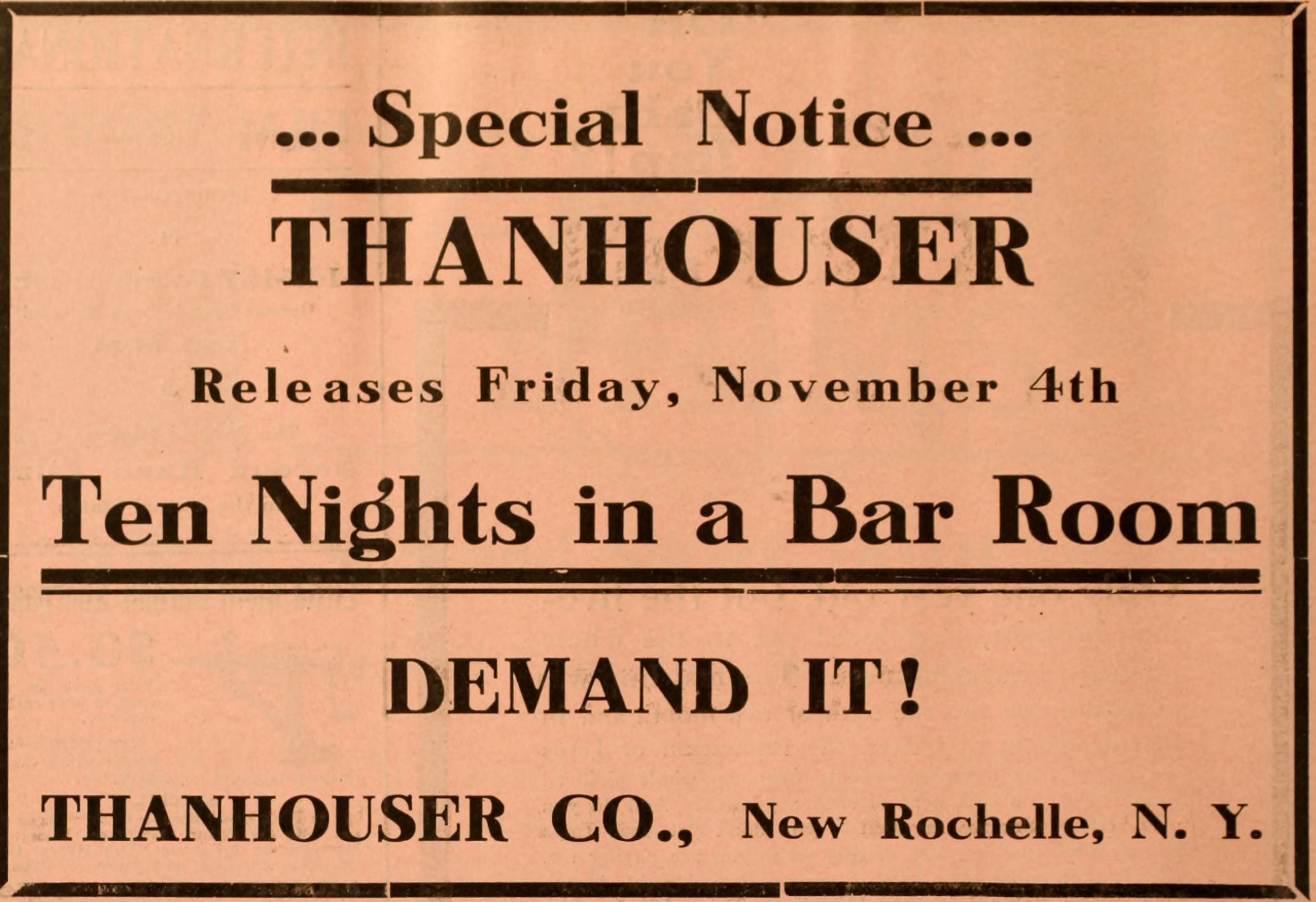
- An advertisement for the film
- Produced by: Thanhouser Company
- Distributed by: Motion Picture Distributing and Sales Company
- Release date: November 4, 1910
- Country: United States
- Languages: Silent film English intertitles

Ten Nights in a Bar Room is a 1910 American silent short drama produced by the Thanhouser Company. Adapted from the novel Ten Nights in a Bar-Room and What I Saw There by Timothy Shay Arthur and the stage adaptation of that novel Ten Nights in a Bar-Room (1858) by William W. Pratt, the production focuses on Joe Morgan after he has become a hopeless drunkard. Often Morgan's young daughter, Mary, comes to beg her father to return home. One day, she appears during a fight between the two men and is fatally struck by a bottle thrown by the saloon-keeper. Before Mary dies she asks her father to promise to swear off alcohol and he accepts. He is reformed and becomes successful, while the saloon-keeper is killed in a fight in an irony of fate. The film was released on November 4, 1910 and met with mixed reviews. The film is presumed lost.

== Plot ==
The work was an adaptation of Timothy Shay Arthur's novel Ten Nights in a Bar-Room and What I Saw There (1854) and the long-running popular stage adaptation of that novel Ten Nights in a Bar-Room (1858) by William W. Pratt. The Moving Picture World synopsis states: "Despite the fact that he is a loving husband and father, Joe Morgan ruins his life by his fondness for drink and finally becomes a seemingly hopeless drunkard. He spends his time and money in the saloon kept by Slade, the man who took away Joe's mill and largely caused his financial ruin. Slade's saloon, when he first opened it, was well furnished, the landlord courteous and well groomed, and the customers happy and seemingly unaffected by their surroundings. But as time passed, a change for the worse was noted in everything. Probably this escaped Joe's notice, for a sharp shot, indeed, was needed to reform him. That shock came. Joe's only daughter, Mary, was in the habit of going to the saloon and piteously urging her father to come home. She knew that no matter how intoxicated he might be, he would never harm her. But one evening when she appeared her father and Slade had been quarreling, and the saloonkeeper threw a bottle at Morgan, who dodged. The missile struck the child, entering. The blow resulted fatally, but before Mary died, she extracted a promise from her grief-stricken father that he would never drink again, a promise which he ever-afterward kept. In later years Joe became wealthy and respected, and influenced by the thought of his daughter in heaven he kept in the straight and narrow path. The saloon keeper who killed Mary was never punished by the law - but through the irony of fate his taking off was much like that of Joe Morgan's helpless child."

== Cast ==
- Frank H. Crane as Joe Morgan
- Marie Eline as Little Mary

== Production ==
The production was based on Ten Nights in a Bar-Room and What I Saw There by Timothy Shay Arthur. The plot focused on the dangers of alcoholism and the downfall of those taken in by its effects. In the 1850s, sales of the novel were second only to Harriet Beecher Stowe's Uncle Tom's Cabin. The production was adapted for the stage in 1858 and while it did not perform well on Broadway, it proved to be a lasting success. Dozens of productions would cross the United States for the next sixty years and the play proved to be a major influence on the Temperance movement, resulting in the passage of temperance laws. It is likely that the writer of the scenario was Lloyd Lonergan. The film director is unknown, but it may have been Barry O'Neil or Lucius J. Henderson. Cameramen employed by the company during this era included Blair Smith, Carl Louis Gregory, and Alfred H. Moses, Jr. though none are specifically credited. The role of the cameraman was uncredited in 1910 productions. Only the roles of Frank H. Crane and Marie Eline are known. The other cast credits are unknown, but many 1910 Thanhouser productions are fragmentary. In late 1910, the Thanhouser company released a list of the important personalities in their films. The list includes G.W. Abbe, Justus D. Barnes, Frank H. Crane, Irene Crane, Marie Eline, Violet Heming, Martin J. Faust, Thomas Fortune, George Middleton, Grace Moore, John W. Noble, Anna Rosemond, Mrs. George Walters.

== Release and reception ==
The single reel drama, approximately 1,000 feet long, was released on November 4, 1910. The film was released outside of the planned order due to a scheduling conflict. Originally The American and the Queen was planned to be released on this date, but it was instead pushed back to November 11. The film received mixed reviews from critics, H. Jeanval of The Moving Picture News stated that the costuming and lace curtains on the windows of the home betrayed the supposed poverty of the Morgan family. Walton, also of The Moving Picture News, stated, "This title would be completely misunderstood by the majority of moving picture show attendants. Some sporadic 'reformer' who does not know the original and who has never seen the film will fill 'space' on the iniquity of moving pictures founded on this title. If he did see the film it has not the necessary power to grapple with the terrible reality of a too common incident in daily life." The New York Dramatic Mirror was more picky in its wording and praise, stating: "It was to be supposed that some company would finally present this familiar drama in pictorial form, and a reviewer must feel glad that it is over, for the film doesn't materially exalt the level of film output." The review found the acting to be good, but found fault in the shadows of the actors fell towards a lamp instead of away from it. The New York Dramatic Mirror was not a neutral party for reviews and took a shot at the Thanhouser Company by running an article that stated: "The Selig Company announces the production of Ten Nights in a Bar Room will not be confined to one reel, but will be given all the film that it requires for proper production. This departure from the restrictive limit of 1,000 feet gives promise that the drama will have adequate treatment." Bowers states that the paper "was acting the role of a spoiler, for the Selig version was not released until a half year later, in June 1911, and, except for spite, there was no reason to mention it now."

Thomas S. Hischak, author of American Literature on Stage and Screen: 525 Works and Their Adaptations, claims that the Thanhouser production is the earliest known film adaptation of the novel. This is an error because Lubin would produce an adaptation, 700 feet in length, by October 1903.

== See also ==
- List of American films of 1910
