= Arizona Days =

Arizona Days may refer to:

- Arizona Days (1928 film), American silent film directed by J. P. McGowan
- Arizona Days (1937 film), American western directed by John English
