= Brysis Coleman =

American screenwriter

Grace Brysis Coleman
- Born: Brysis Noah; August 20, 1902; Kansas City, Kansas, USA
- Died: February 7, 1969 (aged 66); Los Angeles, California, USA
- Education: Lincoln High School (1920)
- Occupation: Screenwriter
- Years active: 1928

Brysis Coleman — born Grace Brysis Noah — was an American screenwriter active during the late 1920s in Hollywood. She wrote a string of Westerns for director J.P. McGowan.

== Biography ==
Brysis was born in Kansas City, Kansas, to Logan Noah and Grace Mulligan. She graduated from Lincoln High School in 1920, and soon after moved to Hollywood to pursue a career in the fledgling film industry. She began working as a secretary for J. Charles Davis, president of El Dorado Productions, and from there was given a chance to write screenplays. She was married several times: first to Earl Brubaker, next to Gene Coleman, then to Raymond Hodges, and then Gordon Whitnall.

== Selected filmography ==
- West of Santa Fe (1928)
- Arizona Days (1928)
- Silent Trail (1928)
