= The Hollywood Reporter (film) =

1926 film

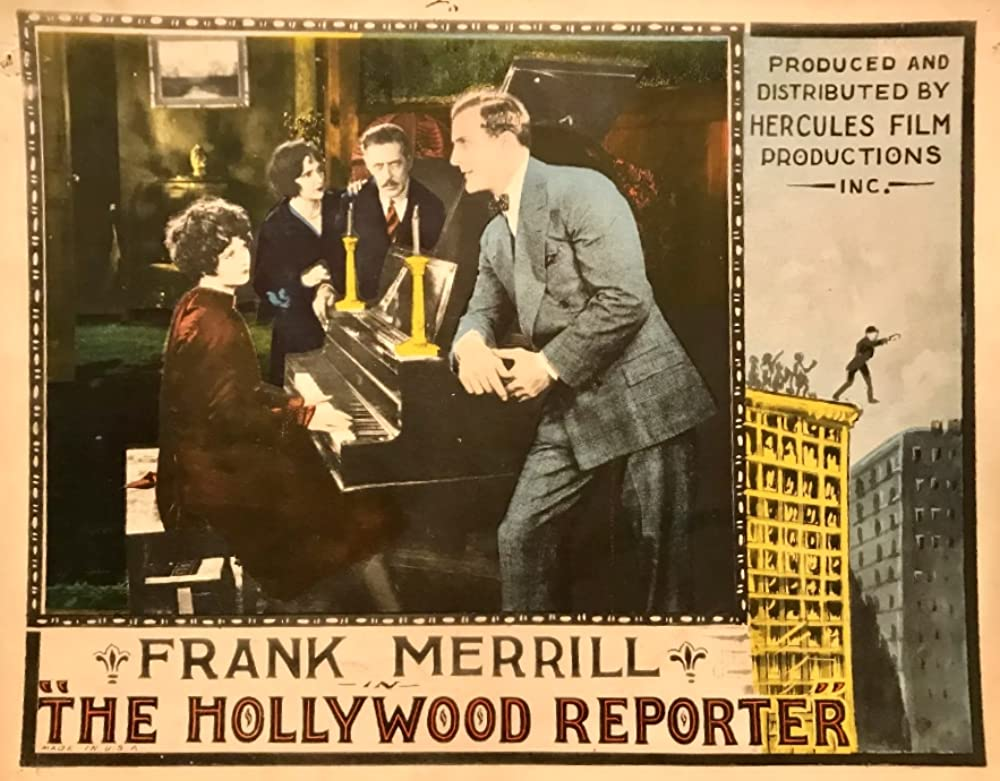
- Directed by: Bruce Mitchell
- Written by: Grover Jones
- Produced by: Peter Kanellos
- Starring: Frank Merrill; Peggy Montgomery; Charles K. French
- Production company: Hercules Film Productions
- Distributed by: Hercules Film Productions; Ideal Films (UK)
- Release date: January 1926
- Running time: 50 minutes
- Country: United States
- Languages: Silent; English intertitles

The Hollywood Reporter is a 1926 American silent crime drama film directed by Bruce Mitchell and starring Frank Merrill, Peggy Montgomery and Charles K. French.

== Synopsis ==
Corrupt city boss Hymie During, running for election, tries to gain the support of the editor of the Hollywood Morning Express by blackmailing him over time he had once served in prison. The editor gets his top reporter Billy Hudson, who is in love with his daughter, to try and dig up evidence against During.

== Cast ==
- Frank Merrill as Billy Hudson
- Charles K. French as Basil Manning
- Peggy Montgomery as Lois Manning
- William T. Hayes as Dell Crossley
- Jack Richardson as Hymie During
- Violet Schram as Margaret Latham

== Bibliography ==
- Connelly, Robert B. The Silents: Silent Feature Films, 1910-36, Volume 40, Issue 2. December Press, 1998. ISBN 9780913204368
- Munden, Kenneth White. The American Film Institute Catalog of Motion Pictures Produced in the United States, Part 1. University of California Press, 1997. ISBN 9780520209695
