= John Lowell (actor) =

American film actor

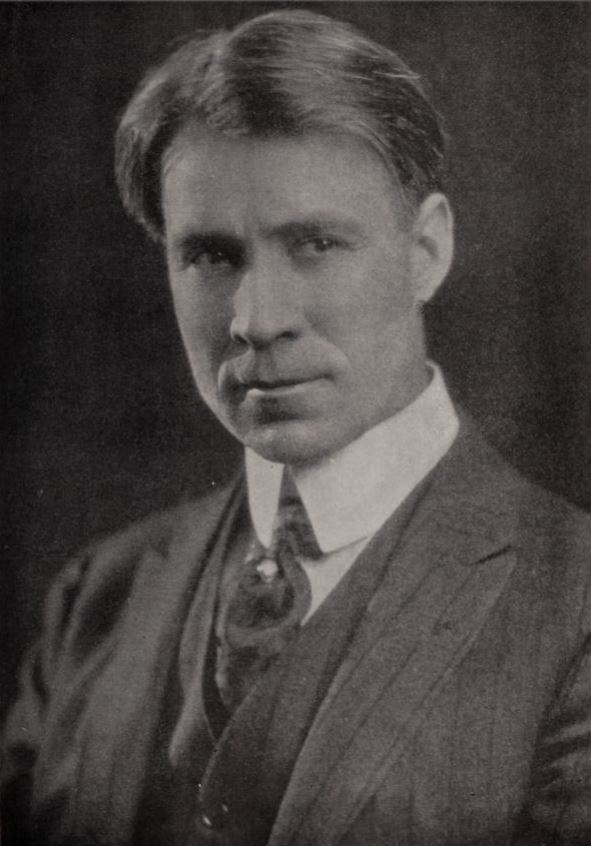
- Born: April 22, 1875; Pleasant Valley, Iowa, U.S.
- Died: September 19, 1937 (aged 62); Los Angeles, California, U.S.
- Other name: John Lowell Russell
- Occupation: Actor
- Years active: 1919–1933 (film)
- Spouse: Lillian Case Russell
- Children: Evangeline Russell; John L. Russell

John Lowell (April 11, 1875 – September 19, 1937) was an American film actor who starred in several productions during the silent era. He is sometimes credited as John Lowell Russell.

== Biography ==
Lowell was born in Pleasant Valley, Iowa. He was married to the screenwriter Lillian Case Russell. The actress Evangeline Russell and the cinematographer John L. Russell were their children.

Lowell began his film career in 1919, appearing in two shorts. He was a producer for Lowell Film Productions, whose work included Red Love (1925).

On September 19, 1937, Lowell died in Los Angeles, California.

== Partial filmography ==
- Fruits of Passion (1919)
- Tangled Trails (1921)
- Ten Nights in a Bar Room (1921)
- Lost in a Big City (1923)
- Floodgates (1924)
- Red Love (1925)
- The Big Show (1926)
- Arizona Days (1928)
- Silent Trail (1928)
- Manhattan Cowboy (1928)
- Show People (1928)
- Headin' Westward (1929)
- Bad Men's Money (1929)
- Fighters of the Saddle (1929)
- Captain Cowboy (1929)
- Wyoming Tornado (1929)
- Gold (1932)
- McKenna of the Mounted (1932)
- Treason (1933)
