= Treason (1933 film) =

1933 film

- Theatrical release poster
- Directed by: George B. Seitz
- Written by: Gordon Battle
- Produced by: Irving Briskin
- Starring: Buck Jones
- Cinematography: John W. Boyle
- Edited by: Otto Meyer
- Distributed by: Columbia Pictures
- Release date: February 10, 1933
- Running time: 63 minutes
- Country: United States
- Language: English

Treason is a 1933 American pre-Code Western film directed by George B. Seitz and starring Buck Jones.

== Cast ==
- Buck Jones as Jeff Connors, posing as Chet Dawson (as Charles 'Buck' Jones)
- Shirley Grey as Joan Randall
- Robert Ellis as Colonel Jedcott
- Ivor McFadden as O'Leary (as Ivar McFadden)
- Edward LeSaint as Judge Randall (as Ed Le Saint)
- Frank Lackteen as Chet Dawson
- T.C. Jack as Buck Donohue (as T.C. Jacks)
- Charles Brinley as Army Scout Johnson
- Charles Hill Mailes as General Hawthorne (as Charles Hills Mailes)
- Edwin Stanley as Attorney
- Art Mix as First Lieutenant
- Frank Ellis as Randall-Rider Lafe
- Nick Cogley as Tom (uncredited)
- John Lowell as Juror (uncredited)
