= Hawk of the Hills (1927 serial) =

1927 film

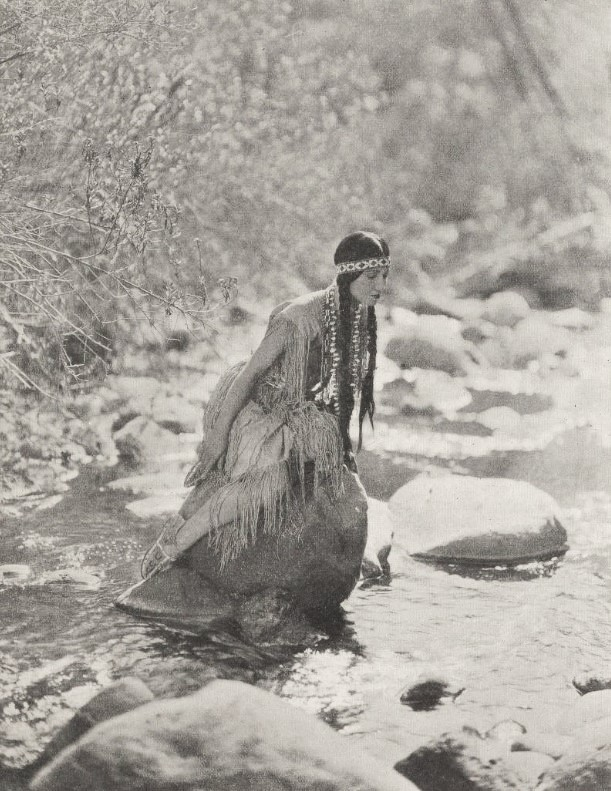
- Still with Evangeline Russell
- Directed by: Spencer Gordon Bennet
- Written by: George Arthur Gray
- Starring: Allene Ray; Walter Miller
- Cinematography: Frank Redman; Edward Snyder
- Distributed by: Pathé Exchange
- Release date: August 28, 1927
- Running time: 10 episodes
- Country: United States
- Languages: Silent Version; 1929 Sound Version (Synchronized) (English Intertitles)

Hawk of the Hills is a 1927 American silent Western film serial directed by Spencer Gordon Bennet. The serial was edited into a sound feature in 1929. While the sound version has no audible dialog, it was released with a synchronized musical score with sound effects using both the sound-on-disc and sound-on-film process.

== Cast ==
- Allene Ray as Mary
- Walter Miller as Laramie
- James Robert Chandler as Clyde Selby
- Jack Ganzhorn as Henry Selby
- Frank Lackteen as The Hawk
- Paul Panzer as Manson
- Wally Oettel as Shorty
- Harry Semels as Sheckard
- Jack Pratt as Colonel Jennings
- J. Parks Jones as Lieutenant MacCready
- Frederick Dana as Larry
- John T. Prince as The Hermit
- Whitehorse (as Chief Whitehorse)
- George Magrill
- Evangeline Russell as Indian Maiden
- Chief Yowlachie as Chief Long Hand

== Chapter titles ==
1. The Outlaws
2. In the Talons of the Hawk
3. Heroes in Blue
4. The Attack
5. The Danger Trail
6. The Death Menace of Lost Canyon
7. Demons of the Darkness
8. Doomed to the Arrows
9. The House of Horror
10. The Triumph of Law and Law

== See also ==
- List of early sound feature films (1926–1929)
- List of film serials
- List of film serials by studio
