= Somewhere in Georgia =

American baseball film

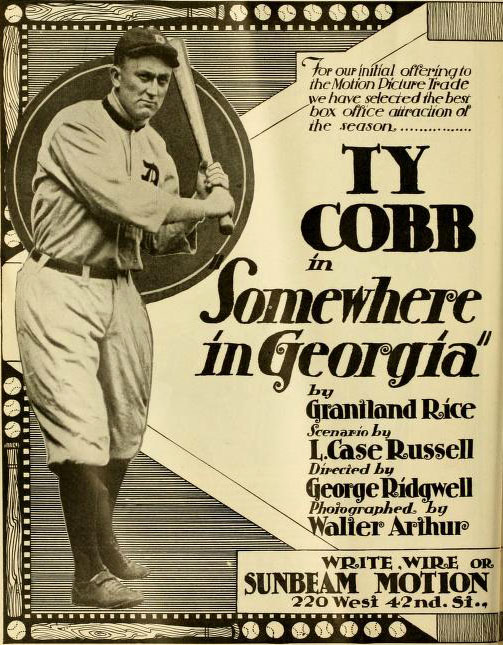
- Directed by: George Ridgwel
- Written by: Grantland Rice; Lillian Case Russell (scenario)
- Starring: Ty Cobb
- Cinematography: Walter Arthur
- Release date: June 1917
- Running time: 30 minutes
- Country: United States
- Languages: Silent film English intertitles

Somewhere in Georgia is a 1917 silent film, starring baseball great Ty Cobb. It was based on a short story by sports columnist Grantland Rice.

== Plot ==
Ty Cobb is a small-town Georgian bank clerk with a talent for baseball. He is signed to play with the Detroit Tigers and is forced to leave his sweetheart behind, whereupon a crooked bank cashier sets his sights on the girl. Upon learning that Cobb has briefly returned home to play an exhibition game with his old team, the cashier arranges for Cobb to be kidnapped. Breaking loose from his bonds, Cobb beats up all of his captors and shows up at the ball field just in time to win the game for the home team.

== Cast ==
- Ty Cobb as Himself
- Elsie MacLeod as The Banker's Daughter
- William Corbett as Himself
- Harry Fisher
- Edward Boulden as Himself
- Ned Burton

== Cobb's salary ==
Cobb starred in the motion picture Somewhere in Georgia for a sum of $25,000 plus expenses (equivalent to approximately $628,000 today).

== Reception ==
Broadway critic Ward Morehouse called the movie "absolutely the worst flicker I ever saw, pure hokum."

== Survival status ==
No prints of this film are known to survive.

== See also ==
- List of baseball films
