= The Big Show (1926 film) =

1926 silent film

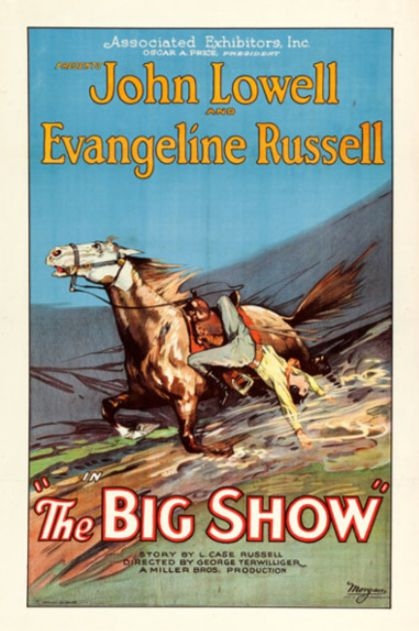
- Directed by: George Terwilliger
- Written by: Lillian Case Russell
- Starring: John Lowell; Evangeline Russell; Jane Thomas
- Cinematography: David W. Gobbett
- Production company: Miller Brothers Productions
- Distributed by: Associated Exhibitors
- Release date: October 15, 1926
- Running time: 60 minutes
- Country: United States
- Languages: Silent; English intertitles

The Big Show is a 1926 American silent drama film directed by George Terwilliger and starring John Lowell, Evangeline Russell and Jane Thomas. The film is set in a travelling circus show, where a stranger joins the show and becomes a star attraction. He ends up crossing swords with a millionaire who had swindled him out his share in some oil lands during World War I.

== Cast ==
- John Lowell as Bill
- Evangeline Russell as Ruth Gordon
- F. Serrano Keating as Norman Brackett
- Jane Thomas as Marian Kearney
- Joseph Miller as Col Jim Kearney
- Dan Dix as Stumpy Dan
- Alice Lecacheur as Fifi
- Maida Blatherwick as Dolly
- Joe E. Lewis as Abie

== Bibliography ==
- Munden, Kenneth White. The American Film Institute Catalog of Motion Pictures Produced in the United States, Part 1. University of California Press, 1997.
