= McKenna of the Mounted =

1932 film

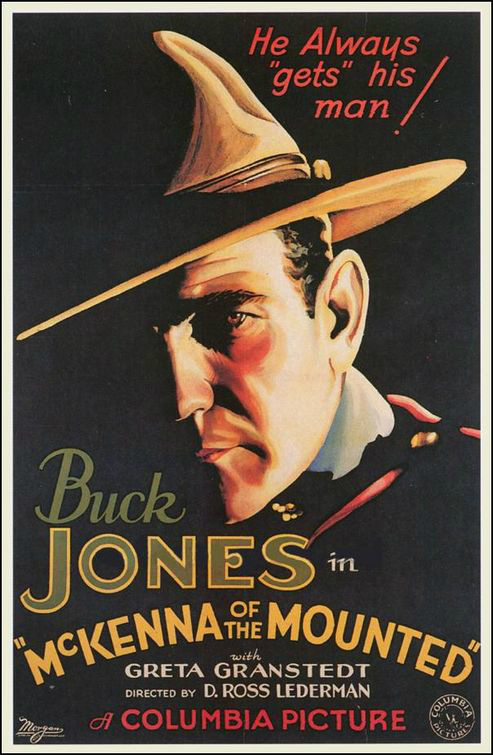
- Film poster
- Directed by: D. Ross Lederman
- Written by: Stuart Anderson (dialogue); Randall Faye (story)
- Starring: Buck Jones
- Cinematography: Benjamin H. Kline
- Edited by: Gene Milford
- Music by: Mischa Bakaleinikoff; Karl Hajos
- Distributed by: Columbia Pictures
- Release date: August 26, 1932
- Running time: 67 minutes
- Country: United States
- Language: English

McKenna of the Mounted is a 1932 American pre-Code Western film directed by D. Ross Lederman. A print is housed in the Library of Congress collection.

== Cast ==
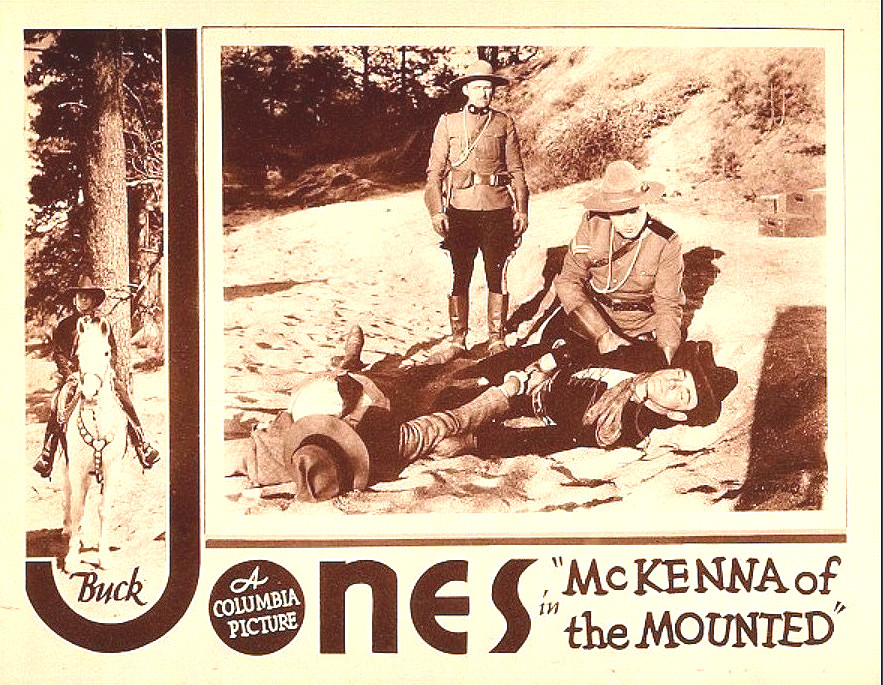
Lobby card

- Buck Jones as Sergeant Tom McKenna
- Greta Granstedt as Shirley Kennedy
- Walter McGrail as Inspector Oliver P. Logan
- Mitchell Lewis as Henchman Pierre
- Niles Welch as Morgan
- Ralph Lewis as Kennedy
- James Flavin as Corporal Randall McKenna
- John Lowell as Man at Meeting

== Production ==
The film was completed in just 9 days, finishing in May 1932.
