= Evangeline Russell =

American actress (1902–1966)

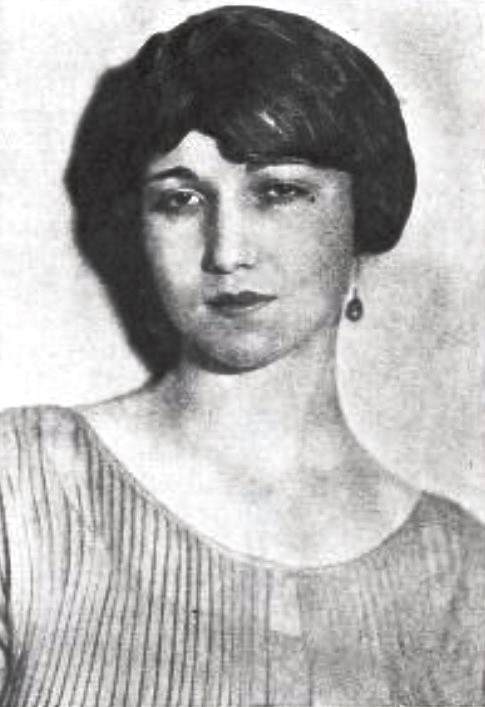
- From a 1924 advertisement
- Born: Evangeline Frances Russell; August 18, 1902; New York City, U.S.
- Died: February 22, 1966 (aged 63); Los Angeles, California, U.S.
- Occupation: Actress
- Spouse(s): Roy Anthony Wayne (divorced); Raymond Herbert Claymore (m. 1926; div. 1926); Carey Harrison (divorced); J. Stuart Blackton (m. 1936–1941; his death); William P.S. Earle
- Children: 2
- Parents: John Lowell (father); Lillian Case Russell (mother)
- Relatives: John L. Russell (brother)

Evangeline Frances Russell (August 18, 1902 – February 22, 1966) was an American actress known for her work in silent Westerns of the 1920s. She was the daughter of actor John Lowell Russell and screenwriter Lillian Case Russell. Her brother was Academy Award–nominated cinematographer John L. Russell.

== Biography ==
Russell was born in Manhattan to actor John Russell Lowell and screenwriter Lillian Case Russell. She had a brother, John L. Russell, who became a cinematographer. She was noted as an expert horsewoman and race car driver.

She pursued a career as an actress in Westerns, often playing the wife of characters played by her father (in scripts written by her mother). Her credits include films like The Isle of Sunken Gold, The Big Show, and Lost in a Big City. She was something of a method actor; she recounted trying to harden her feet by walking barefoot for six weeks in preparation for a role in 1927's Hawk of the Hills.

Russell was married at least five times; her husbands included director William P.S. Earle (her final husband), producer J. Stuart Blackton, Roy Wayne, actor Carey Harrison, and rancher Raymond Claymore; she divorced him when she found out he was "a full-blooded Indian". She had two children with Harrison, neither of whom were interested in the family business.

After Blackton (whose fortune was lost in the Great Depression) died in a car accident in 1941, she fell on hard times, taking on work as a babysitter, stuntwoman, extra, and taxi driver to supplement her income and support her children.

She died in Los Angeles in 1966; she was survived by Earle and her two children, Frank and Elizabeth, from her marriage to Harrison.

== Filmography ==
- Lost in a Big City (1923)
- Floodgates (1924)
- It Might Happen to You (1925, short)
- Red Love (1925)
- The Big Show (1926)
- Married? (1926)
- The Isle of Sunken Gold (1927)
- Hawk of the Hills (1927)
- Hawk of the Hills (1929)
