= Hap Hadley =

American artist and actor (1895–1976)

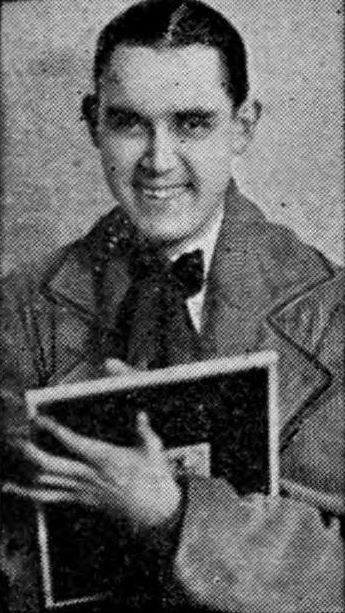
- Hadley c. 1922
- Born: Alvan Cordell Hadley; March 16, 1895; Findlay, Illinois, US
- Died: 16 March 1976 (aged 81); New York City, New York, US
- Known for: Painting, drawing, caricatures, posters

Alvan Cordell "Hap" Hadley (March 16, 1895 – August 4, 1976) was an American artist specializing in pen and ink representations of popular subjects. He created posters for various films, including Buster Keaton's The General (1926) and Charlie Chaplin's The Circus (1928), as well as promotional posters for the Ringling Bros. and Barnum & Bailey Circus and billboards for Roy Rogers. A movie poster of The General was sold by Christie's East on December 5, 1994, for $46,000.

He was also an actor, performing in the 1920–21 Broadway revue The Greenwich Village Follies of 1920 at the Shubert Theatre in New York City and the 1924 film Floodgates.

Gallery of posters by Hap Hadley
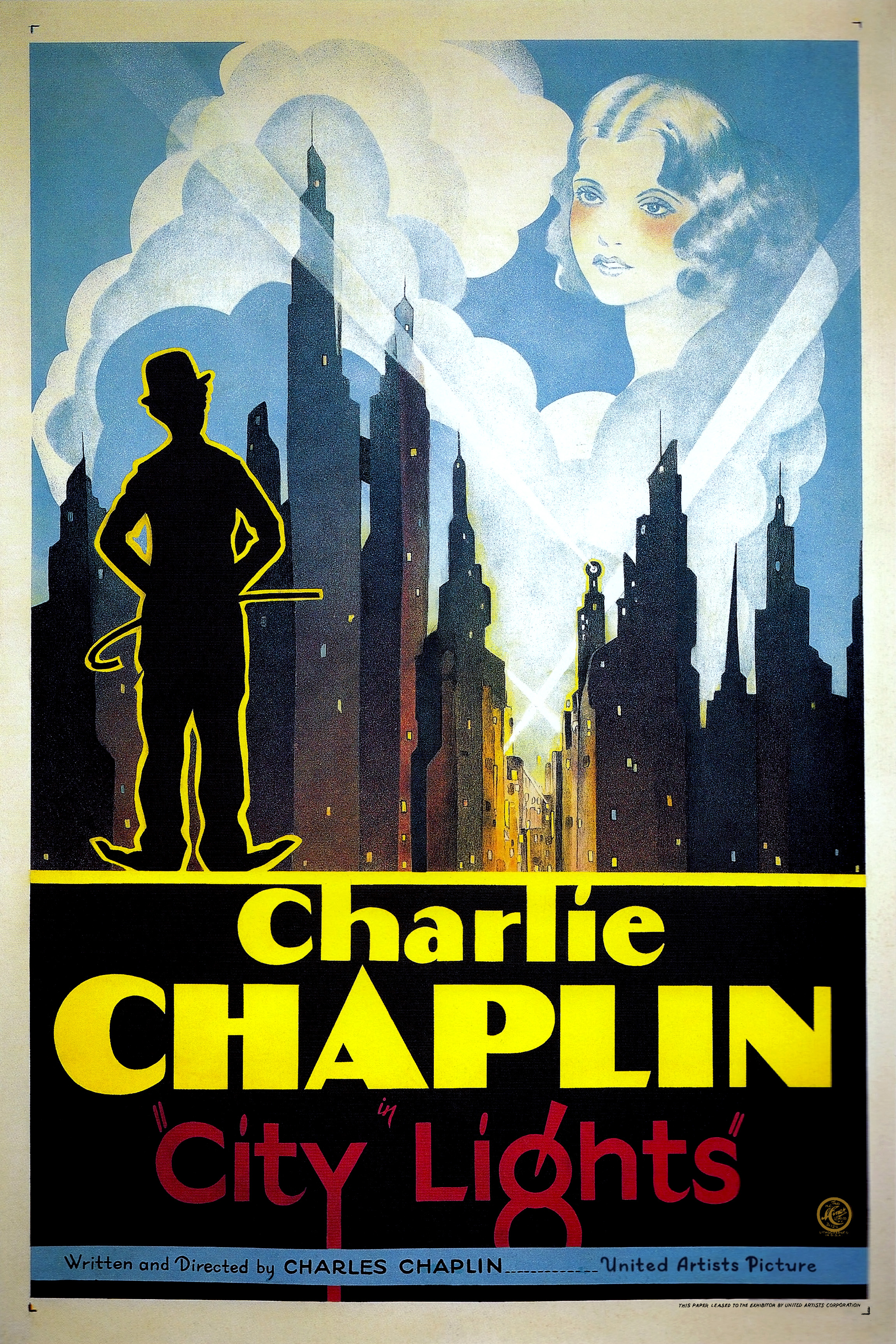
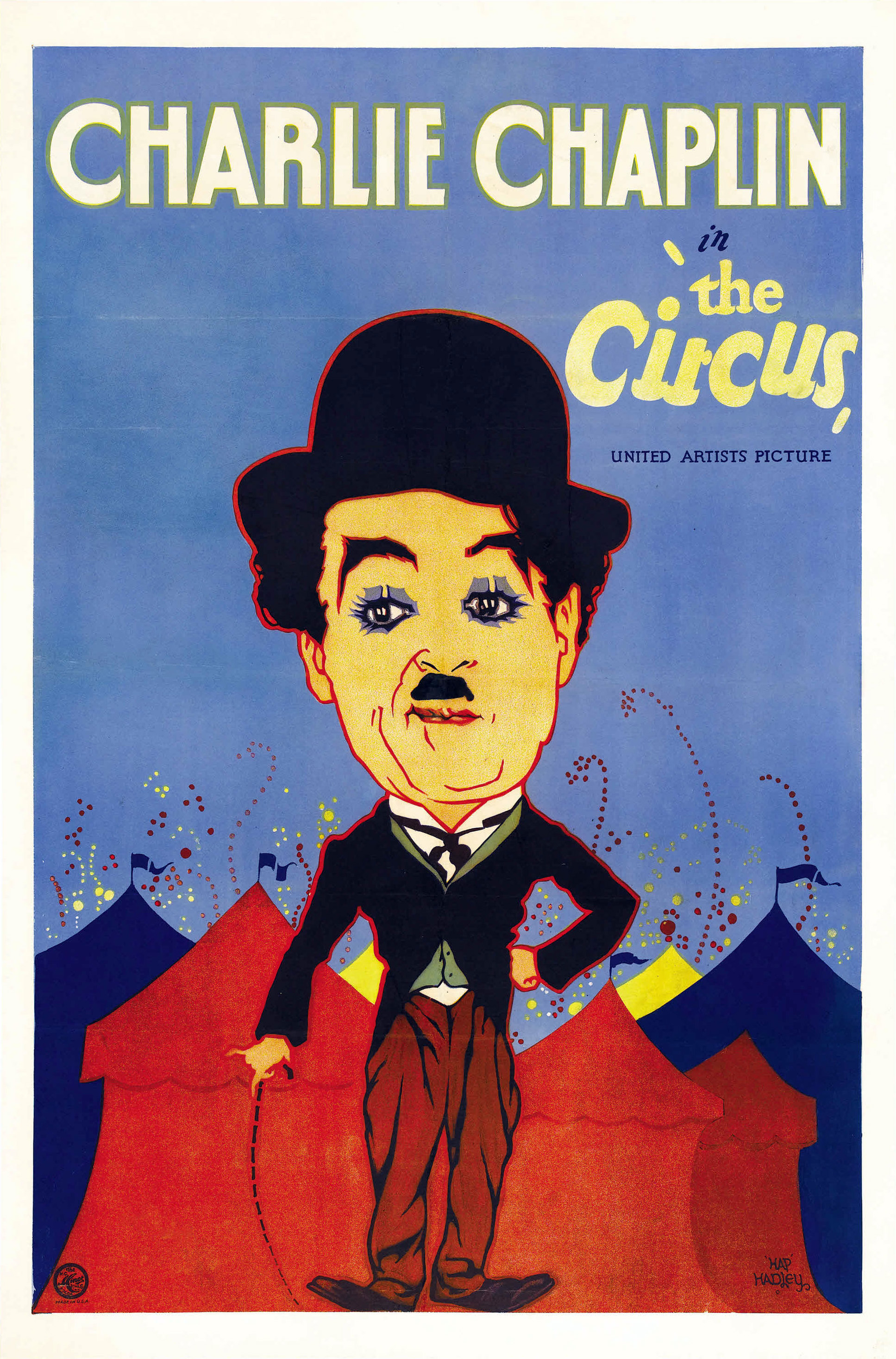
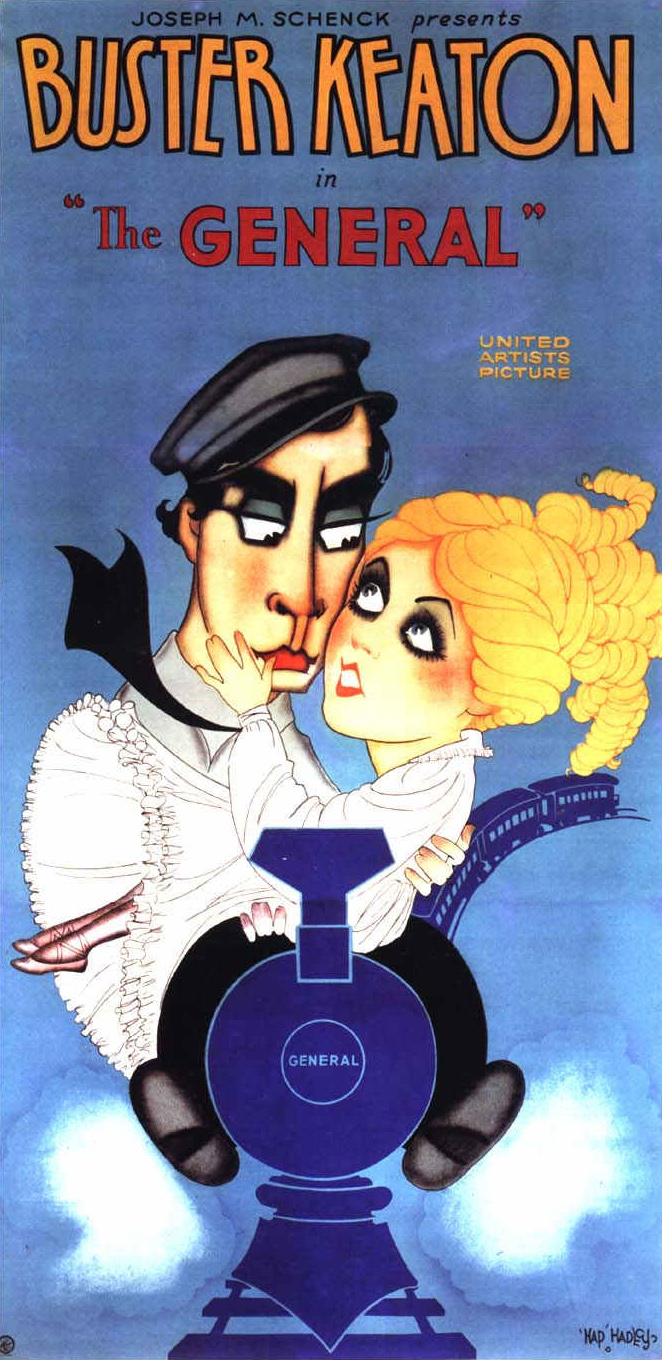
