= Lillian Case Russell =

American screenwriter (1876–1947)

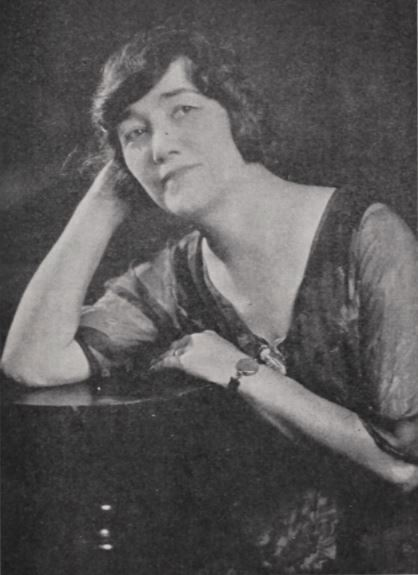
- Born: Lulu E. Case; April 3, 1876; Yankton, Dakota Territory, U.S.
- Died: June 2, 1947 (aged 71); Hollywood, California, U.S.
- Occupation: Screenwriter
- Spouse: John Lowell Russell (m.1901)
- Children: John L. Russell; Evangeline Russell

Lillian Case Russell (born Lulu E. Case; April 3, 1876 – June 2, 1947), often credited as L. Case Russell, was an American screenwriter during Hollywood's silent era. She was married to actor John Lowell Russell.

== Biography ==
Lulu E. Case was born in Yankton, Dakota Territory on April 3, 1876. She graduated from Yankton High School in 1893.

She worked as a schoolteacher in her hometown before moving to New York to pursue a career as a writer; she wrote for a number of newspapers and magazines around the turn of the century.

She married actor John Lowell Russell in Manhattan in 1901; they had two children, future cinematographer John L. Russell and future actress Evangeline Russell. By 1925, they had relocated to Los Angeles, where she wrote scripts for Vitagraph and he worked as an actor.

She wrote more than 30 scripts between 1914 and 1926. Many of her films were for Blazed Trail Productions, which specialized in Westerns. She enjoyed fostering young talent in the industry, and wrote two of the earliest books on screenwriting.

She was found dead in the pool at her son John's house in North Hollywood, California, in 1947; the cause of death was listed as drowning.

== Partial filmography ==
- All for a Girl (1915)
- The Two Edged Sword (1915)
- The Black Butterfly (1916)
- The Soul of a Magdalen (1917)
- Somewhere in Georgia (1917) (short)
- To the Death (1917)
- The Light Within (1918)
- The Life Mask (1918)
- Tempered Steel (1918)
- Merely Players (1918)
- The Water Lily (1919)
- Fruits of Passion (1919)
- The Clouded Name (1919)
- The Heart of Big Dan (1920)
- Cousin Kate (1921)
- The Wakefield Case (1921)
- Ten Nights in a Bar Room (1921)
- Lost in a Big City (1923)
- The Broken Violin (1923)
- Floodgates (1924)
- Red Love (1925)
- The Big Show (1926)
