= Ann Brody =

American actress (1884–1944)

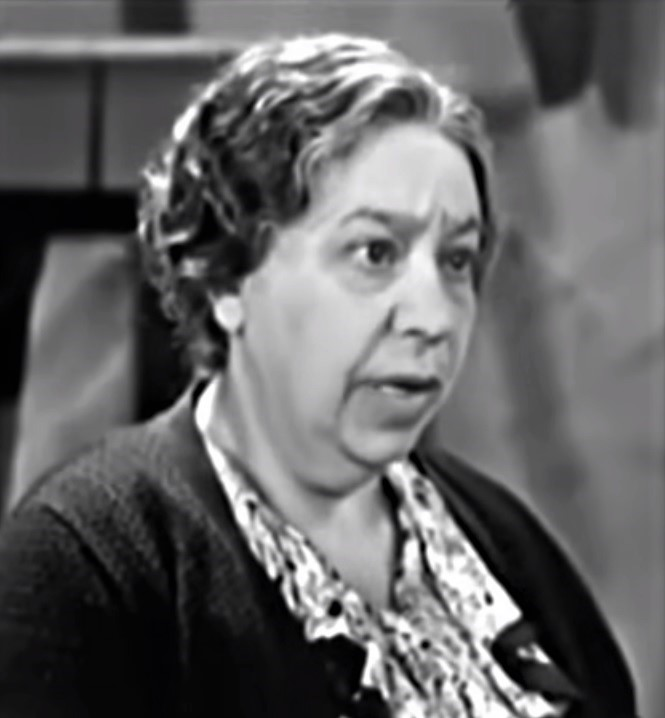
- Brody in The Sin of Nora Moran (1933)
- Born: Ann Brody Goldstein; August 29, 1884; Poland
- Died: July 16, 1944 (aged 59); New York City, U.S.
- Occupation: Actress
- Years active: 1895–1940

Ann Brody Goldstein (August 29, 1884 – July 16, 1944), known professionally as Ann Brody, was an American film actress of the silent era. Brody was known as a pioneer film actress.

== Career ==
Brody started acting on stage when she was nine years old in a children's theatre in New York. She later toured throughout the United States as part of stock companies. Her first film role was in a 1912 Vitagraph film, and she later became a part of the studio. People that she worked with included Norma Talmadge, Wally Van, Hughie Mack, and Flora Finch. She acted in Hollywood film productions in the 1920s. The Tennessean said in 1926 that Brody was most interested in "comedy with a tear" roles and that the film Too Much Money gives her "a splendid opportunity to prove that she is best-fitted for the roles that combine comedy with pathos". The San Francisco Examiner wrote in 1929 that Brody has one of her best roles in the film My Man. During the mid-1930s, Brody moved back to New York to perform in Broadway plays. Brody was known for her film roles as Jewish mothers. Brody's 50th year as a stage actress was celebrated in 1937. Her last stage role was in the 1940 play The Time of Your Life. She was known as a pioneer film actress.

The Pasadena Post said in 1929 that Brody is "a specialist in character roles for films". The Los Angeles Evening Post-Record in 1933 said, "Ann Brody, whose Jewish maternal characterizations are stage and screen classics, is returning to the footlights once more".

== Personal life ==
Brody was born in Poland on August 29, 1884. She died in a New York City hotel room on July 16, 1944, from what appeared to be natural causes.

== Partial filmography ==
- The Suspect (1916)
- The Princess of Park Row (1917)
- The Perfect Lover (1919)
- Headin' Home (1920)
- Shams of Society (1921)
- Lost in a Big City (1923)
- A Sainted Devil (1924)
- Soul-Fire (1925)
- Red Love (1925)
- The Manicure Girl (1925)
- Too Much Money (1926)
- Why Girls Say No (1927)
- Jake the Plumber (1927)
- Alias the Lone Wolf (1927)
- Heroes in Blue (1927)
- Turn Back the Hours (1928)
- My Man (1928)
- The Case of Lena Smith (1929)
- Betrayal (1929)
- Times Square (1929)
- So This Is College (1929)
- Playing Around (1930)
- A Royal Romance (1930)
- The Drums of Jeopardy (1931)
- The Drifter (1932)
- The Heart of New York (1932)
- High Gear (1933)
- The Sin of Nora Moran (1933)
- Ellis Island (1936)
