= Floodgates (film) =

1924 silent film

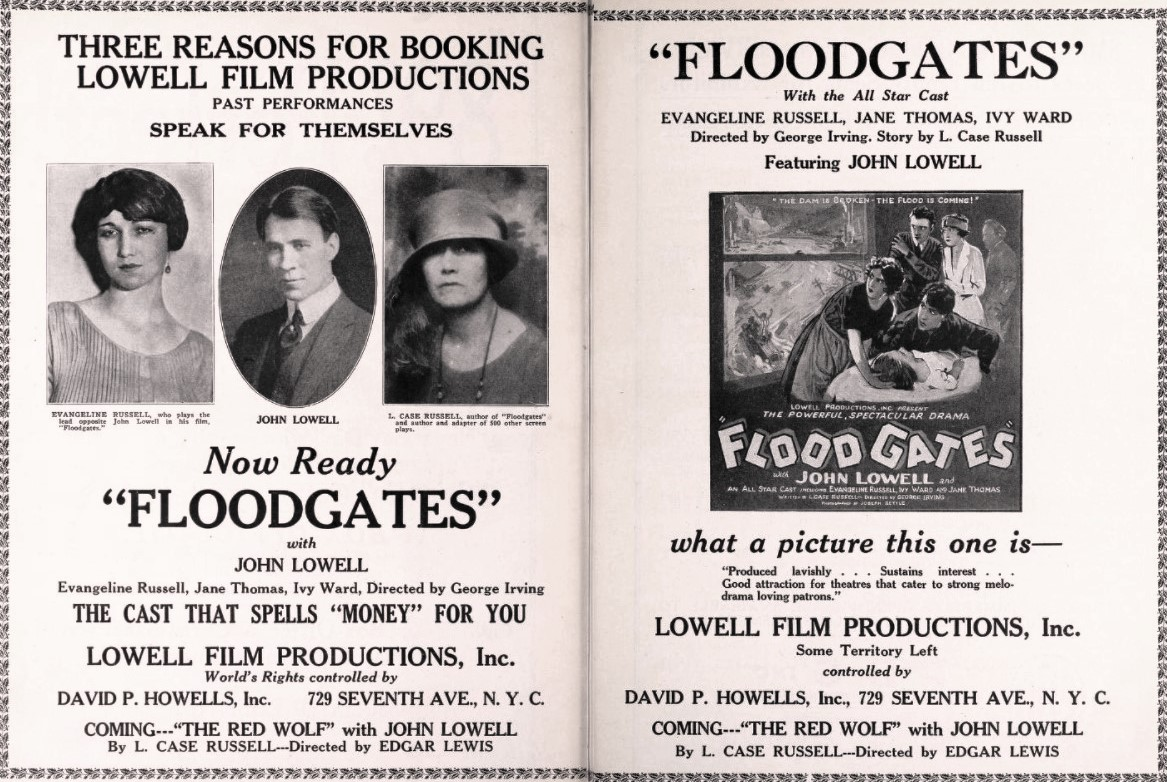
- Advertisement
- Directed by: George Irving
- Written by: Lillian Case Russell
- Starring: John Lowell; Evangeline Russell; Jane Thomas
- Cinematography: Joseph Settle
- Production company: Lowell Film Productions
- Distributed by: Davis Distributing Division
- Release date: February 29, 1924
- Running time: 70 minutes
- Country: United States
- Language: Silent (English intertitles)

Floodgates is a 1924 American silent drama film directed by George Irving and starring John Lowell, Evangeline Russell, and Jane Thomas.

== Plot ==
As described in a film magazine review, mill owner Lem Bassett desires to erect a dam for water power, and, in order to secure permission from the land owners in the District, he persuades his foreman Dave Trask to encourage the measure. Trask has implicit faith in Bassett and, through his influence, the landowners agree. Later Bassett floods the land in an effort to purchase the land surrounding the lake. The landowners object and accuse Dave of cheating them. Tom Bassett is in love with Dave's sister Ruth and, while motoring his car, strikes Dave's child Peggy, paralyzing her. The child is taken to Tom's house for an operation and, while the operation is in progress, Dave blows up the dam using dynamite and the rushing waters sweep all before it. The flood reaches Tom's house and Dave rescues the child. Tom is wounded and cannot reach safety. The flood sweeps the house away with Tom clinging on to a piece of debris. He is rescued by Dave after a heroic struggle.

== Cast ==
- John Lowell as Dave Trask
- Evangeline Russell as Ruth Trask
- Jane Thomas as Alice Trask
- Baby Ivy Ward as Peggy Trask
- William Calhoun as Lem Bassett
- F. Serrano Keating as Tom Bassett
- William Cavanaugh as Morton
- Frank Montgomery as Jeff
- J.N. Bradt as Sliver
- Homer Lind as Dr. Vedos
- Arthur Ludwig as Regan
- Hap Hadley as Ladus

== Bibliography ==
- Munden, Kenneth White. The American Film Institute Catalog of Motion Pictures Produced in the United States, Part 1. University of California Press, 1997.
