= West of Santa Fe =

1928 film directed by J.P. McGowan

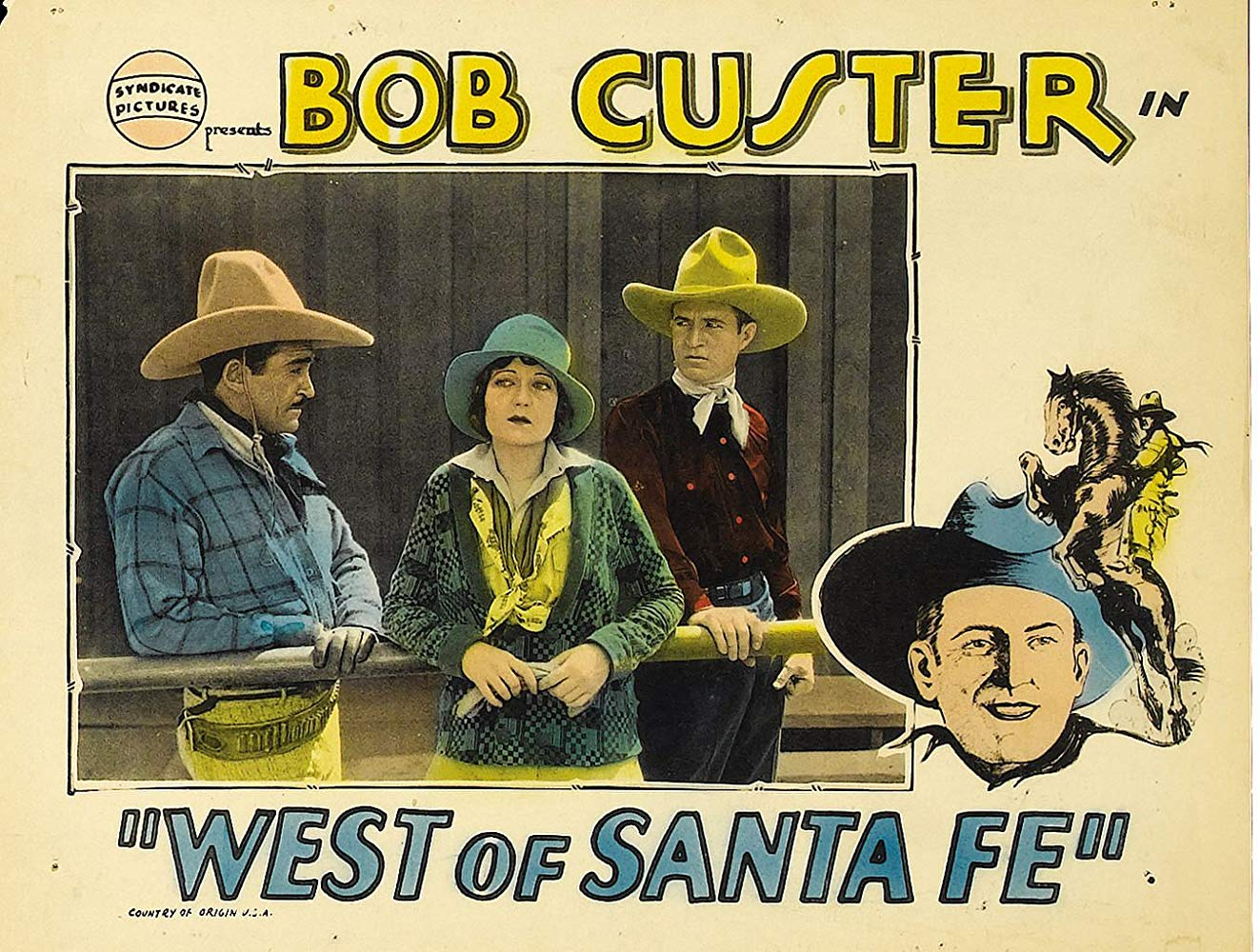
- Directed by: J.P. McGowan
- Written by: Brysis Coleman; Mack V. Wright
- Produced by: J. Charles Davis
- Starring: Bob Custer; Peggy Montgomery; Bud Osborne
- Cinematography: Paul H. Allen; Hap Depew
- Production company: El Dorado Productions
- Distributed by: Syndicate Pictures
- Release date: October 1, 1928
- Running time: 48 minutes
- Country: United States
- Languages: Silent; English intertitles

West of Santa Fe is a 1928 American silent Western film directed by J.P. McGowan and starring Bob Custer, Peggy Montgomery and Bud Osborne.

== Cast ==
- Bob Custer as Jack
- Peggy Montgomery as Helen
- Bud Osborne as Crooked Foreman
- J.P. McGowan as Rancher
- Mack V. Wright as Henchman
- Ralph Bucko as Henchman
- Roy Bucko as Henchman
- Cliff Lyons as Cowhand

== Bibliography ==
- John J. McGowan. J.P. McGowan: Biography of a Hollywood Pioneer. McFarland, 2005.
