= Red Love (1925 film) =

1925 film

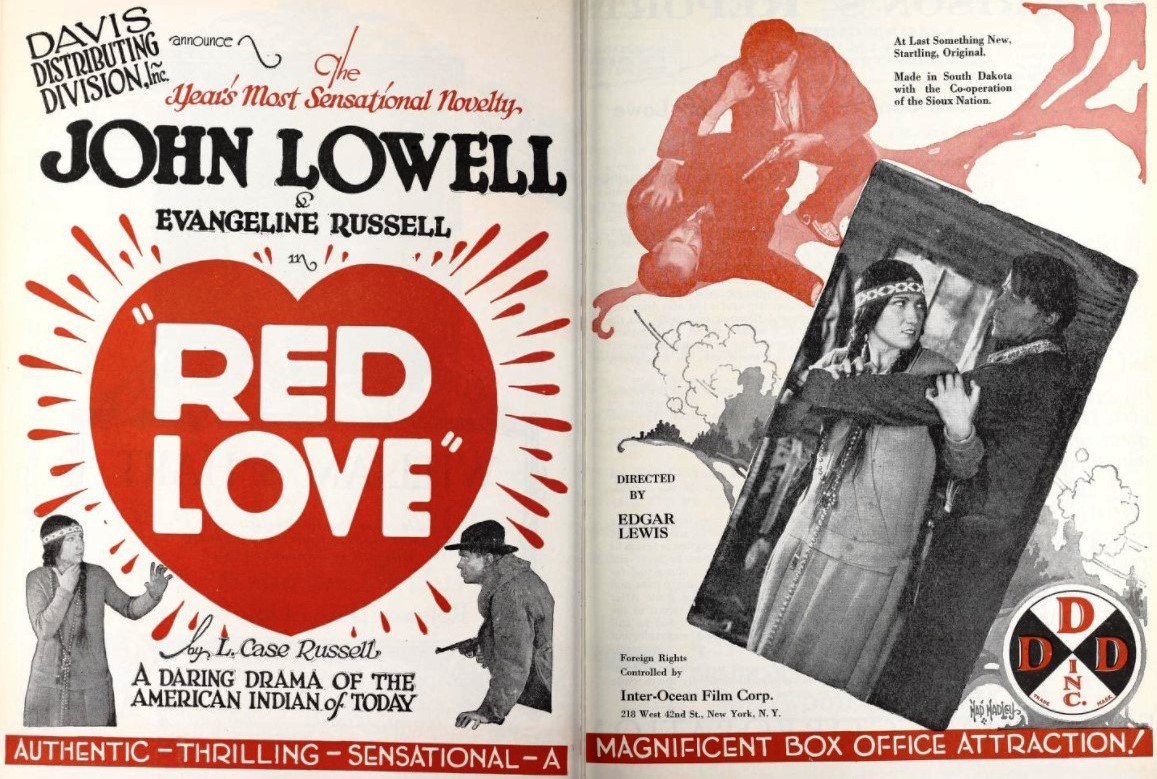
- Advertisement
- Directed by: Edgar Lewis
- Written by: Lillian Case Russell
- Starring: John Lowell; Evangeline Russell; Ann Brody
- Cinematography: Joseph Settle
- Production company: Lowell Film Productions
- Distributed by: Davis Distributing Division
- Release date: May 1925
- Running time: 60 minutes
- Country: United States
- Languages: Silent; English intertitles

Red Love is a 1925 American silent Western film directed by Edgar Lewis and starring John Lowell, Evangeline Russell, and Ann Brody.

== Plot ==
As described in a film magazine review, Thunder Cloud, an educated Sioux young man, provokes the enmity of Bill Mosher, a vicious white man. He whips the man because an insult. When he believes he has killed the man, he flees to other parts. After a romance with Starlight, an Indian maid, he finally surrenders. In the courtroom, his honor is vindicated.

== Cast ==
- John Lowell as Thunder Cloud
- Evangeline Russell as Starlight
- F. Serrano Keating as James Logan, Little Antelope
- William Calhoun as Sheriff La Verne
- Ann Brody as Mrs. La Verne
- William Cavanaugh as Dr. George Lester
- Wallace Jones as Bill Mosher
- Charles W. Kinney as Sam Gibbons
- Frank Montgomery as Two Crows
- Dexter McReynolds as Scar-Face
- Chick Chandler as Tom Livingston

== Bibliography ==
- Connelly, Robert B. The Silents: Silent Feature Films, 1910-36, Volume 40, Issue 2. December Press, 1998.
- Hearne, Joanna. Native Recognition: Indigenous Cinema and the Western. SUNY Press, 2013.
