= The Two Edged Sword =

1916 silent film by George D. Baker

- Directed by: George D. Baker
- Screenplay by: Lillian Case Russell; Eugene V. Webster
- Starring: Edith Storey
- Cinematography: Joseph Shelderfer
- Release date: March 20, 1916 (USA)
- Running time: 50 minutes
- Language: Silent (with English intertitles)

The Two Edged Sword is a 1916 silent Vitagraph drama directed by George D. Baker. The film was written by Eugene V. Brewster and Lillian Case Russell, and it starred Edith Storey and Evart Overton.

== Plot ==
A bored married woman (Josephine Earle) tired of her workaholic novelist husband (Jed Brooks) embarks on a trip with her friend and meets a handsome farmer she begins a fling with. The farmer (Logan Paul) falls head over heels, but the woman doesn't take it seriously. When her husband pays a surprise visit to the farm, the farmer realizes he's been had, and after the husband beats him in a fight, he commits suicide. His enraged sister (Edith Storey) vows vengeance.

== Cast ==
- Edith Storey as Mary Brooks
- Evart Overton as Jed Brooks
- Josephine Earl as Dorothy Allen
- Robert Gaillard as Gordon Allen
- Logan Paul as Farmer Brooks

== Production ==
The film was shot in the fall of 1915.
