= Too Much Money (film) =

1926 film by John Francis Dillon

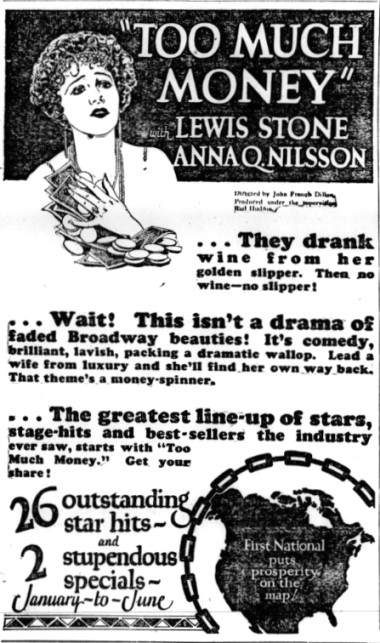
- Advertisement in Variety
- Directed by: John Francis Dillon
- Written by: Joseph F. Poland; Jack Jungmeyer
- Based on: Too Much Money; 1925 play by Israel Zangwill
- Starring: Lewis Stone; Anna Q. Nilsson
- Cinematography: George J. Folsey
- Edited by: Arthur Tavares
- Production company: First National Pictures
- Distributed by: First National Pictures
- Release date: January 3, 1926
- Running time: 70 minutes
- Country: United States
- Language: Silent (English intertitles)

Too Much Money is a 1926 American silent romantic comedy film directed by John Francis Dillon and starring Lewis Stone and Anna Q. Nilsson.

== Plot ==
As described in a film magazine review, after watching his wife Annabel host a pajama breakfast party, Robert Broadley decides to curb his wife's social activities and takes his friend Dana Stuart's advice. He deeds his property to Stuart and tells his wife that they are broke. They move to a small apartment and Robert goes to work as a clerk in a store. While the husband is working, Stuart persuades the wife to elope with him. However, she tips off Robert and he catches up with them, and a fight ensues on the yacht. Meanwhile, the wife abstracts securities from Stuarts bag and then throws the bag overboard, having substituted papers for the valuables. Stuart jumps into the water after the bag. Husband and wife begin a new honeymoon with their regained fortune.

== Cast ==
- Lewis Stone as Robert Broadley
- Anna Q. Nilsson as Annabel Broadley
- Robert Cain as Dana Stuart
- Derek Glynne as Duke Masters
- Edward Elkas as Rabinowitz
- Ann Brody as Mrs. Rabinowitz

== Preservation ==
With no prints of Too Much Money located in any film archives, it is a lost film.
