= Fighters of the Saddle =

1929 film

- Directed by: Robert J. Horner
- Written by: Horace B. Carpenter
- Produced by: J. Charles Davis; Ralph M. Like; Robert J. Horner
- Starring: Art Acord; Peggy Montgomery; John Lowell
- Cinematography: Paul H. Allen
- Edited by: William Austin
- Production company: J. Charles Davis Productions
- Distributed by: Davis Distributing Division
- Release date: August 12, 1929
- Running time: 62 minutes
- Country: United States
- Languages: Silent; English intertitles

Fighters of the Saddle is a 1929 American silent Western film directed by Robert J. Horner and starring Art Acord, Peggy Montgomery and John Lowell. A print of Fighters of the Saddle exists.

== Cast ==
- Art Acord as Dick Weatherby
- Peggy Montgomery as Nesta Wayne
- John Lowell as Henry 'Bulldog' Weatherby
- Tom Bay as Pete - Dick's cousin
- Jack Ponder as Tom Wayne
- Betty Carter as Patty Wayne
- Lynn Sanderson as Art Wayne

== Bibliography ==
- Pitts, Michael R. Western Movies: A Guide to 5,105 Feature Films. McFarland, 2012.
