= On the Divide (film) =

1928 film directed by J.P. McGowan

- Directed by: J.P. McGowan
- Written by: Sally Winters
- Produced by: J. Charles Davis
- Starring: Bob Custer; Peggy Montgomery; Lafe McKee
- Cinematography: Paul H. Allen
- Production company: El Dorado Productions
- Distributed by: Syndicate Pictures
- Release date: September 1, 1928
- Country: United States
- Languages: Silent; English intertitles

On the Divide is a 1928 American silent Western film directed by J.P. McGowan and starring Bob Custer, Peggy Montgomery and Lafe McKee.

== Cast ==
- Bob Custer as Jim Carson
- Peggy Montgomery as Sally Martin
- Lafe McKee
- Bud Osborne
- J.P. McGowan

== Bibliography ==
- John J. McGowan. J.P. McGowan: Biography of a Hollywood Pioneer. McFarland, 2005.
