= Silent Trail =

1928 film directed by J.P. McGowan

- Directed by: J.P. McGowan
- Written by: Brysis Coleman
- Starring: Bob Custer; Peggy Montgomery; John Lowell
- Cinematography: Paul H. Allen; Hap Depew
- Production company: El Dorado Productions
- Distributed by: Syndicate Pictures
- Release date: July 1, 1928
- Country: United States
- Languages: Silent; English intertitles

Silent Trail is a 1928 American silent Western film directed by J.P. McGowan and starring Bob Custer, Peggy Montgomery and John Lowell.

== Cast ==
- Bob Custer
- Peggy Montgomery
- John Lowell
- J.P. McGowan
- Mack V. Wright
- Nancy A. Lee
- Jack Ponder

== Bibliography ==
- John J. McGowan. J.P. McGowan: Biography of a Hollywood Pioneer. McFarland, 2005.
