= Wyoming Tornado =

1929 film directed by J.P. McGowan

- Directed by: J.P. McGowan
- Written by: J.P. McGowan
- Produced by: J. Charles Davis
- Starring: Art Acord; Peggy Montgomery; Slim Whitaker
- Cinematography: George K. Hollister
- Production company: J. Charles Davis Productions
- Distributed by: States Rights
- Release date: July 1, 1929
- Running time: 50 minutes
- Country: United States
- Languages: Silent; English intertitles

Wyoming Tornado is a 1929 American silent Western film directed by J.P. McGowan and starring Art Acord, Peggy Montgomery and Slim Whitaker.

== Cast ==
- Art Acord
- Peggy Montgomery
- J.P. McGowan
- Slim Whitaker
- Bud Osborne
- John Lowell

== Bibliography ==
- Munden, Kenneth White. The American Film Institute Catalog of Motion Pictures Produced in the United States, Part 1. University of California Press, 1997.
