= Bad Men's Money =

1929 film directed by J.P. McGowan

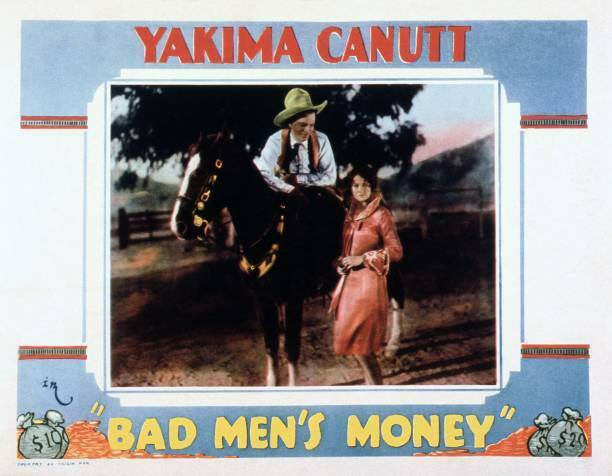
- Directed by: J.P. McGowan
- Written by: J.P. McGowan
- Produced by: J. Charles Davis
- Starring: Yakima Canutt; Peggy Montgomery; John Lowell
- Cinematography: George K. Hollister
- Production company: J. Charles Davis Productions
- Distributed by: Bell Pictures
- Release date: March 31, 1929
- Running time: 50 minutes
- Country: United States
- Languages: Silent; English intertitles

Bad Men's Money is a 1929 American silent Western film directed by J.P. McGowan and starring Yakima Canutt, Peggy Montgomery and John Lowell.

== Cast ==
- Yakima Canutt as Jim Donovan
- Peggy Montgomery as Helen Saunders
- J.P. McGowan as Sheriff Bud Jennings
- Slim Whitaker as Percival McGinnis
- Bud Osborne as Take a Chance Harris
- John Lowell as George Masters
- Lew Meehan as Bluff Hardcastle

== Production ==
Bad Men's Money was the first of three movies that McGowan wrote for Yakima Canutt.
