= Lost in a Big City =

1923 silent film

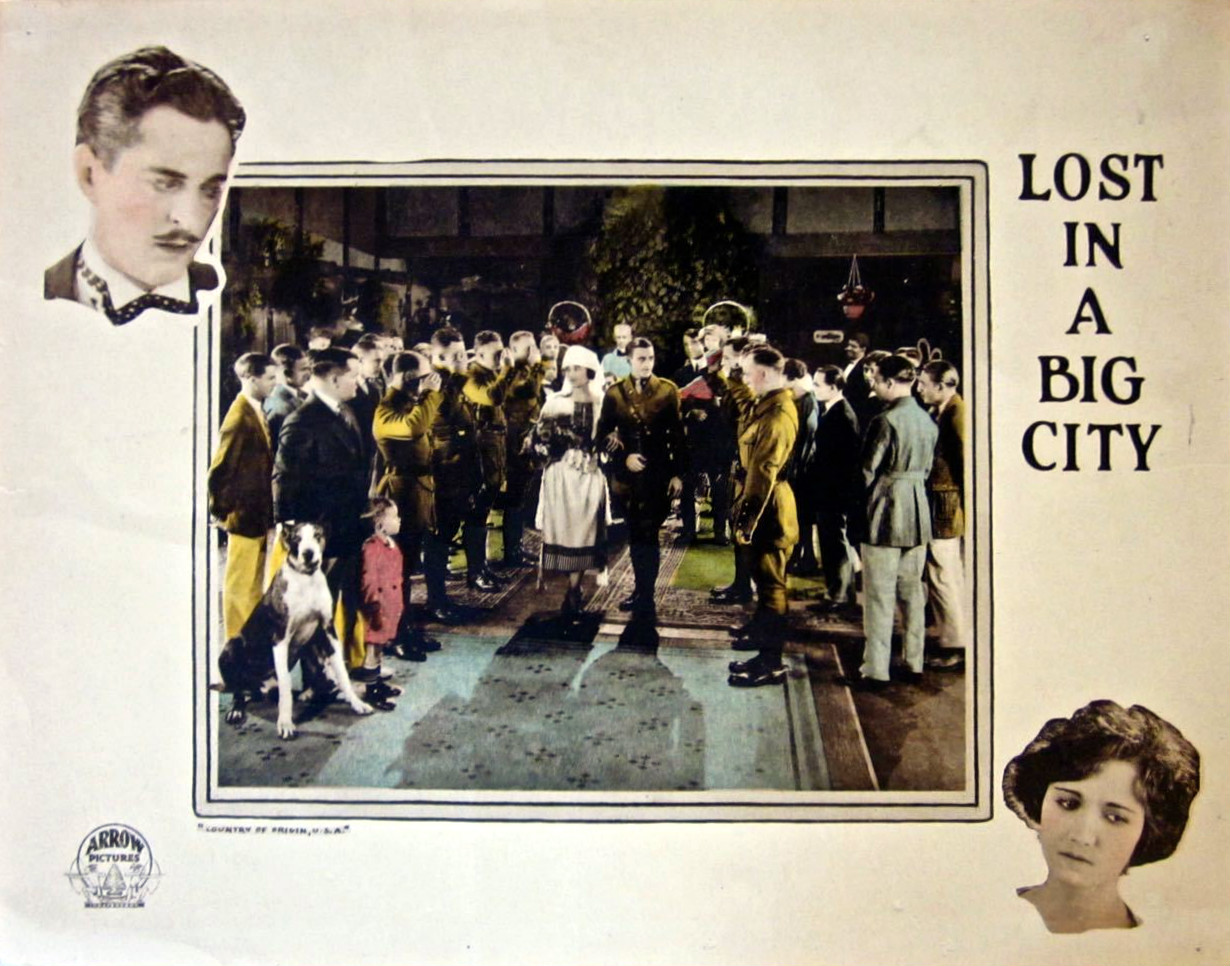
- Directed by: George Irving
- Written by: N.S. Woods; Lillian Case Russell
- Starring: John Lowell; Charles Byer; Jane Thomas
- Cinematography: Joseph Settle
- Production company: Blazed Trail Productions
- Distributed by: Arrow Film Corporation
- Release date: January 10, 1923
- Running time: 80 minutes
- Country: United States
- Languages: Silent; English intertitles

Lost in a Big City is a 1923 American silent drama film directed by George Irving and starring John Lowell, Charles Byer and Jane Thomas.

== Cast ==
- John Lowell as Harry Farley
- Baby Ivy Ward as Florence
- Jane Thomas as Helen
- Charles Byer as Sidney Heaton / Richard Norman
- Evangeline Russell as Blanche Maberly
- Edgar Keller as Salvatori
- Whitney Haley as Duboni
- Eddie Phillips as Trooper Ned Livingston
- Ann Brody as Mrs. Leary
- Charles A. Robins as 'Raisin' Jackson
- Jimmy Phillips as Dick Watkins
- Charles Mackay as Simeon Maberly
- Jules Cowles as Jasper

== Bibliography ==
- Munden, Kenneth White. The American Film Institute Catalog of Motion Pictures Produced in the United States, Part 1. University of California Press, 1997.
