= Peggy Montgomery =

American actress

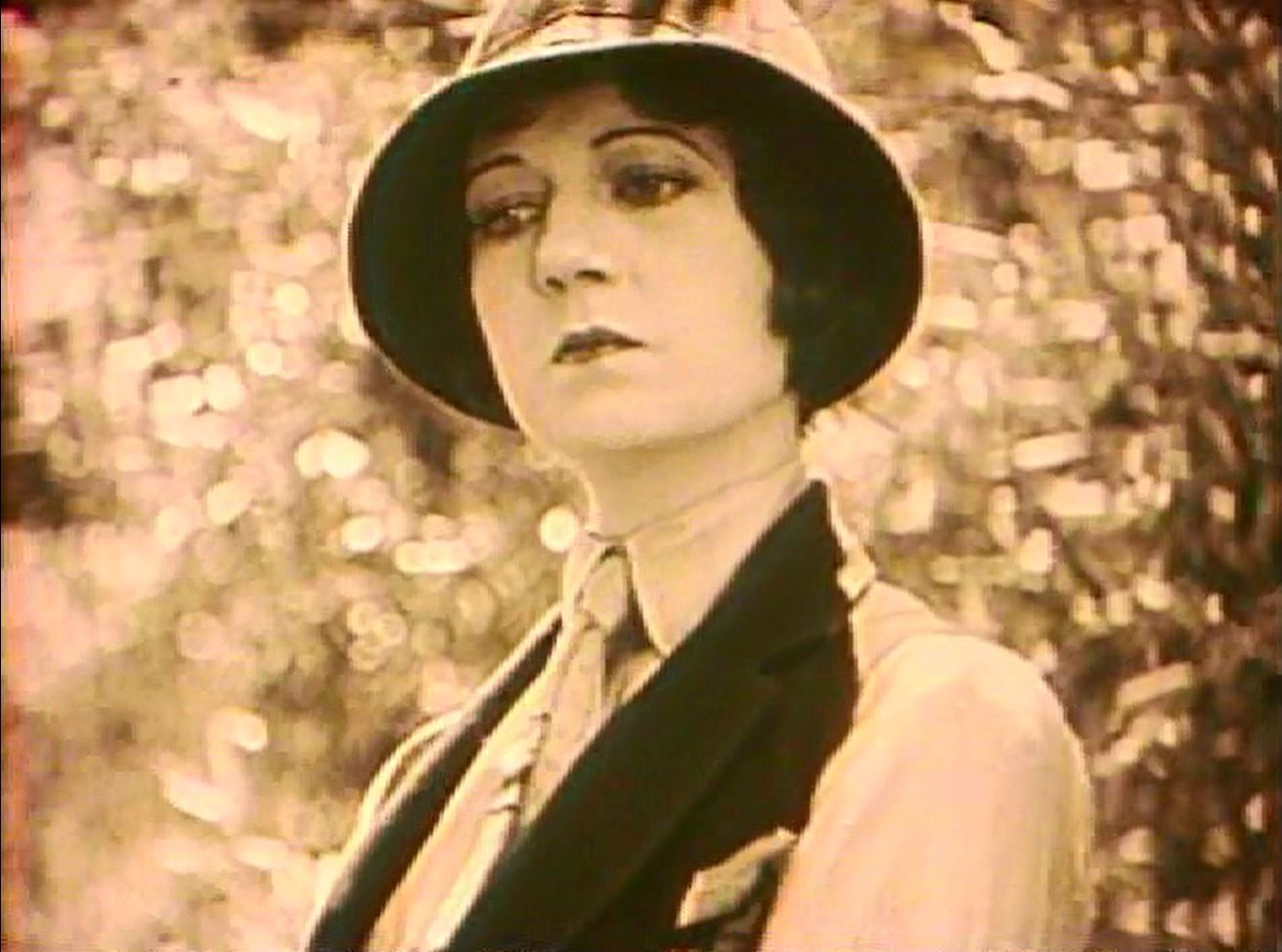
- Montgomery in Arizona Days (1928)
- Born: August 5, 1904
- Died: August 3, 1989 (aged 84)
- Occupation: Actress
- Years active: 1924–1929 (film)

Peggy Montgomery (1904–1989) was an American actress of the silent era. She frequently played female leads in western films.

== Selected filmography ==
- The Speed Demon (1925)
- The Dangerous Dub (1926)
- Looking for Trouble (1926)
- Prisoners of the Storm (1926)
- The Hollywood Reporter (1926)
- Forest Havoc (1926)
- Two-Gun of the Tumbleweed (1927)
- The Desert of the Lost (1927)
- Sensation Seekers (1927)
- The Sonora Kid (1927)
- Splitting the Breeze (1927)
- Hoof Marks (1927)
- Saddle Mates (1928)
- Arizona Days (1928)
- Silent Trail (1928)
- West of Santa Fe (1928)
- On the Divide (1928)
- Fighters of the Saddle (1929)
- Wyoming Tornado (1929)
- Bad Men's Money (1929)

== Bibliography ==
- Munden, Kenneth White. The American Film Institute Catalog of Motion Pictures Produced in the United States, Part 1. University of California Press, 1997.
