= The Sin of Nora Moran =

1933 film

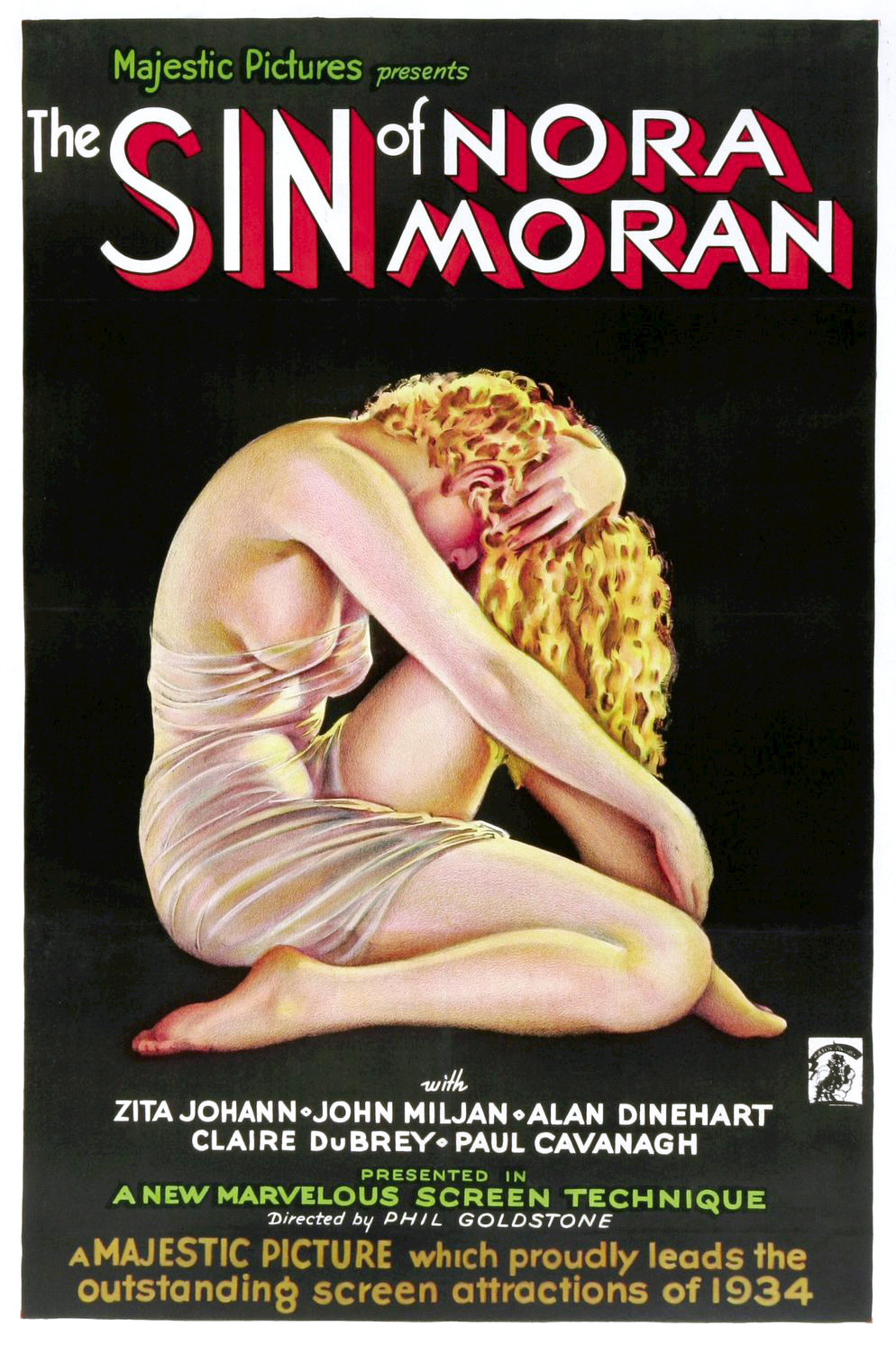
- Theatrical release poster Artwork by Alberto Vargas
- Directed by: Phil Goldstone
- Written by: W. Maxwell Goodhue; Frances Hyland
- Based on: Burnt Offering short story by W. Maxwell Goodhue
- Produced by: Larry Darmour; Phil Goldstone
- Cinematography: Ira H. Morgan
- Edited by: Otis Garrett
- Music by: Heinz Roemheld
- Production company: Majestic Pictures
- Distributed by: Majestic Pictures
- Release date: December 13, 1933
- Running time: 65 minutes
- Country: United States
- Language: English

The Sin of Nora Moran is a 1933 American pre-Code melodrama and proto-noir film directed by Phil Goldstone. It is based on the short story "Burnt Offering" by W. Maxwell Goodhue. The film is also known as Voice from the Grave (American reissue title). Since the protagonist is put to death for a crime she did not commit, some see the film as an argument against capital punishment.

The painting for the movie poster is by Peruvian artist Alberto Vargas, who was working in the United States. He later became known for his images of the "Vargas Girls".

== Plot ==
Edith Crawford, the widow of Governor Dick Crawford, confronts her brother, District Attorney John Grant, with a stack of unsigned love letters she found in her husband's private safe. John advises her to burn them. Edith refuses, vowing to punish the author of the letters. John gives her a newspaper clipping about Nora Moran, the first woman to be executed in the electric chair in twenty years. On death row, and under sedation, Nora remembers the events of her life. A flashback occurs, in which Nora, a five-year-old girl, is adopted by the Morans from a Catholic orphanage. Eight years later, Nora's parents are killed in a car crash. Nora pays off her parents' debt, and seeks work as a chorus girl but is unsuccessful. Paulino, a lion tamer, hires Nora as his assistant. One night, while Nora is sleeping, Paulino rapes her.

Nora befriends an older woman named Sadie, who gives her a hundred dollars. Nora quits the circus, and works at a nightclub in New York. There, she meets and begins an affair with Dick Crawford. He brings her to a rental house over the state line where he can see her twice a week. Meanwhile, Grant grooms Crawford to run for governor to further his own political ambitions. With the election two weeks away, Grant grows suspicious of their affair, to which he investigates Nora's personal history, including her connection to the circus playing in town.

Crawford wins the governorship and Grant becomes the new district attorney. To keep Nora quiet, Grant offers Nora a kickback but she refuses. Two hours later, she calls Grant to the house and shows him Paulino's body. Paulino had discovered Nora and Crawford were seeing each other, and had come to blackmail her. To save Crawford's political reputation, Nora and Grant plan to cover up Paulino's death. Paulino's body is moved near the train, but Nora is apprehended and arrested for first-degree murder.

Nora does not testify in her defense, and is found guilty. In the present, Grant shows Edith another letter Crawford had written to him. Inside his governor's mansion, Crawford learns of Nora's execution, and becomes haunted by his past relationship to Nora. He then remembers his last night with Nora, in which Crawford drives to see her again at the house. There, he discovers her and Paulino together. Crawford fights Paulino and kills him. Feeling guilty of murder, Nora consoles Crawford, telling him their mutual happiness will not be tainted by his crime.

Inside his imagination, Crawford talks to Nora's spirit, who tells him she does not fear death. He tries to prevent the execution but is too late. Consumed with guilt, Crawford writes a letter to Grant, confessing his crime, and shoots himself. In the present, with Edith's consent, Grant burns all of Crawford's letters.

== Cast ==
- Zita Johann as Nora Moran
- John Miljan as Paulino
- Alan Dinehart as District Attorney John Grant
- Paul Cavanagh as Governor Dick Crawford
- Claire Du Brey as Mrs. Edith Crawford
- Sarah Padden as Mrs. Watts
- Henry B. Walthall as Father Ryan
- Otis Harlan as Mr. Moran
- Aggie Herring as Mrs. Moran
- Cora Sue Collins as Nora Moran, as a Child
- Joseph W. Girard as Captain of Detectives
- Ann Brody as Matron
- Rolfe Sedan as Stage Manager
- Otto Yamaoka as Kito (uncredited)

== Production ==
The film was produced at Majestic Pictures, a so-called Poverty Row studio, where producer and director Phil Goldstone was free to experiment without studio moguls looking over his shoulder and questioning every scene. Writing for TCM, Susan Doll observes: “Whether Goldstone is responsible for the haunting, hallucinatory nature of the film is unknown. Apparently, he took over direction from Howard Christy. (sic)(Howard Christie's name was misspelled in the credits.) Whoever was responsible, the film seemed to be ahead of its time. Unfortunately, the unique structure and rapid montages confounded reviewers and audiences, and the film failed at the box office.”

== Reception ==
According to TCM, the film “failed at the box office.

In his December 13, 1933, review for The New York Times, Mordaunt Hall wrote “....It is all very muddled and parts of it are apt to be exceedingly depressing. Although there are glimpses of a circus and of Paulino, the man who was killed, battling with a lion in a cage, the producers have failed to give any drama to the scenes. They have evidently thought that the piling on of agony would result in a story which the spectators would enjoy weeping over. But these offorts succeed only in being tedious.”

The Chicago Daily Tribune wrote, "It might have been gripping if it weren't so confusing."
