= Ten Nights in a Bar-Room (play) =

Ten Nights in a Bar-Room, sometimes given as Ten Nights in a Barroom, is a temperance play in three acts by William W. Pratt. It was adapted from Timothy Shay Arthur's 1854 novel Ten Nights in a Bar-Room and What I Saw There. It was first performed in 1858 in a touring production by Bidwell and Marston's Company. Newspapers report that the BMC company performed the play at Hampden Hall in Springfield, Massachusetts, in July 1858 with Yankee Locke leading the cast as Sample Twichell and Pratt taking on the role of Mr. Romaine. The tour included a stop on Broadway at Purdy's National Theatre; opening there on August 23, 1858 and running for just 7 performances. The cast was led by Yankee Locke as Sample Swichel and Mrs. J. J. Prior as Mrs. Morgan. It played at the National Theatre in Boston after the close of the New York run.

While the play only lasted a week in New York, it had a tremendously successful life as a road show with multiple different companies touring in the play simultaneously for decades. The play had a significant impact in engendering support for the temperance movement in America and was credited with inspiring the creation and passage of temperance laws in multiple states in the United States. The play was revived on Broadway in 1932. The play has been adapted into multiple films; including at least five different short films made between 1897 and 1911. Multiple feature length films have also been made.

Henry Clay Work's temperance song "Come Home, Father", published in 1864, was first performed as a number in Ten Nights in a Bar-Room. Some writers state that it had been sung in Pratt's play since 1858 under the title "Little Mary's Song"; Victoria Waites, for example, relates: "In the play the Innocent Child does eventually persuade the Father to come home, but is then struck on the head by a drinking glass which was aimed at the Father—and little Mary expires with Poor Weeping Mother and Contrite Father beside her." The music historian David Ewen instead writes that it was fashioned after Arthur's novel.
