= Arizona Days (1928 film) =

1928 film directed by J. P. McGowan

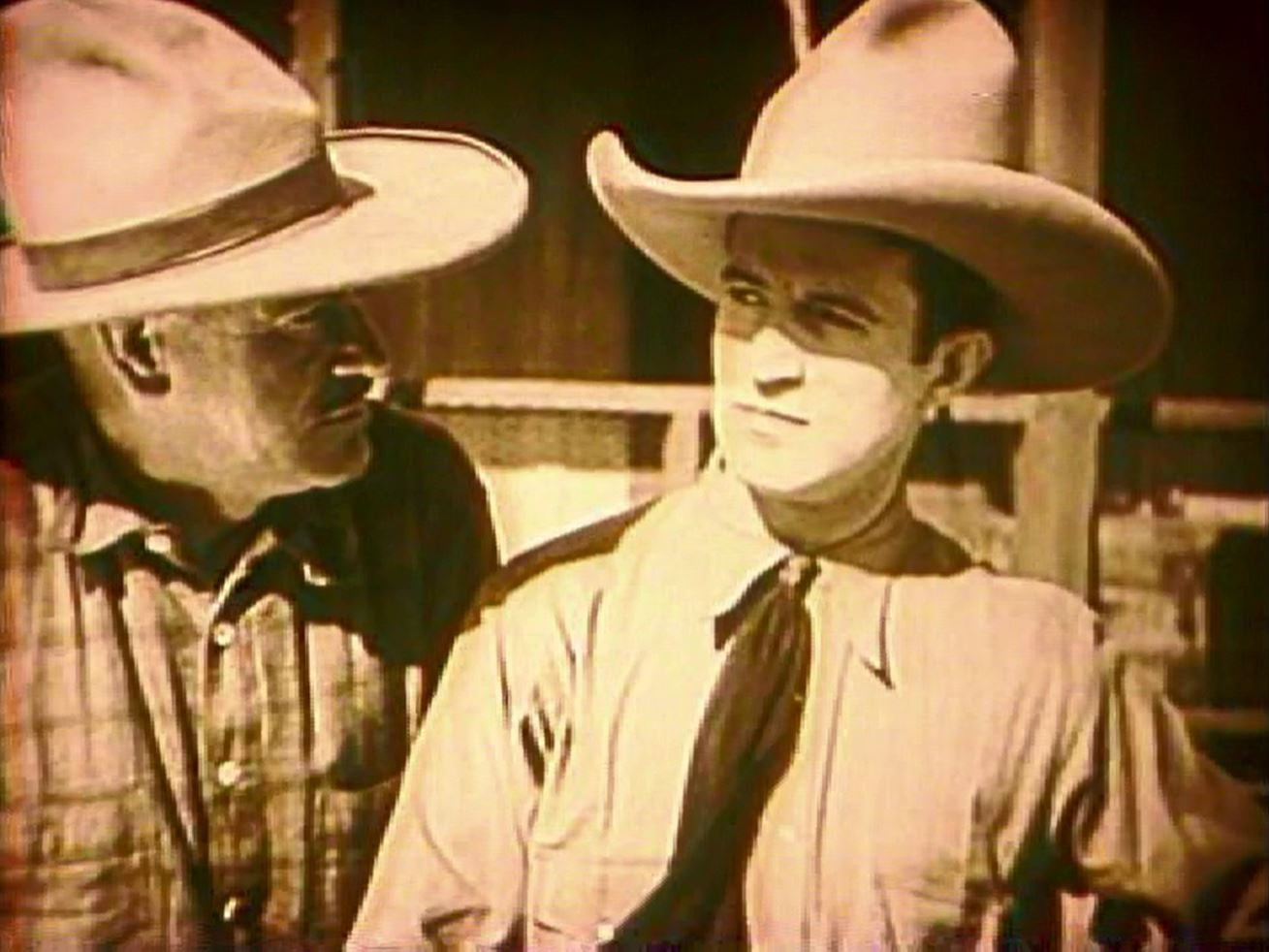
- McGowan and Custer in the film
- Directed by: J. P. McGowan
- Written by: Brysis Coleman (story); Mack V. Wright (writer)
- Produced by: J. Charles Davis II
- Cinematography: Paul H. Allen
- Production company: El Dorado Productions
- Release date: August 1, 1928
- Running time: 44 minutes
- Country: United States
- Languages: Silent; English intertitles

Arizona Days is a 1928 American silent Western film directed by J. P. McGowan, who also portrayed the main villain of the film.

== Plot summary ==
Ed Hicks heads a cattle rustling gang that has run rampant in the fictional Jackson County, Arizona, seemingly with the approval of local cattle owner John Martin. Chuck Drexel, a member of the gang, along with Martin's daughter Dolly and an unlikely transplant from out-of-town combine forces to put an end to the rustlers' treachery, but with much confusion about where everyone's loyalties ultimately lie.

== Cast ==
- Bob Custer as Chuck Drexel
- Peggy Montgomery as Dolly Martin
- John Lowell as John Martin
- J. P. McGowan as Ed Hicks
- Mack V. Wright as Black Bailey
- Jack Ponder as Reginald Van Wiley

== Preservation ==
A complete copy of Arizona Days is held by the UCLA Film & Television Archive.
