= Ten Nights in a Bar-Room and What I Saw There =

1854 novel by Timothy Shay Arthur

Ten Nights in a Bar-room and What I Saw There
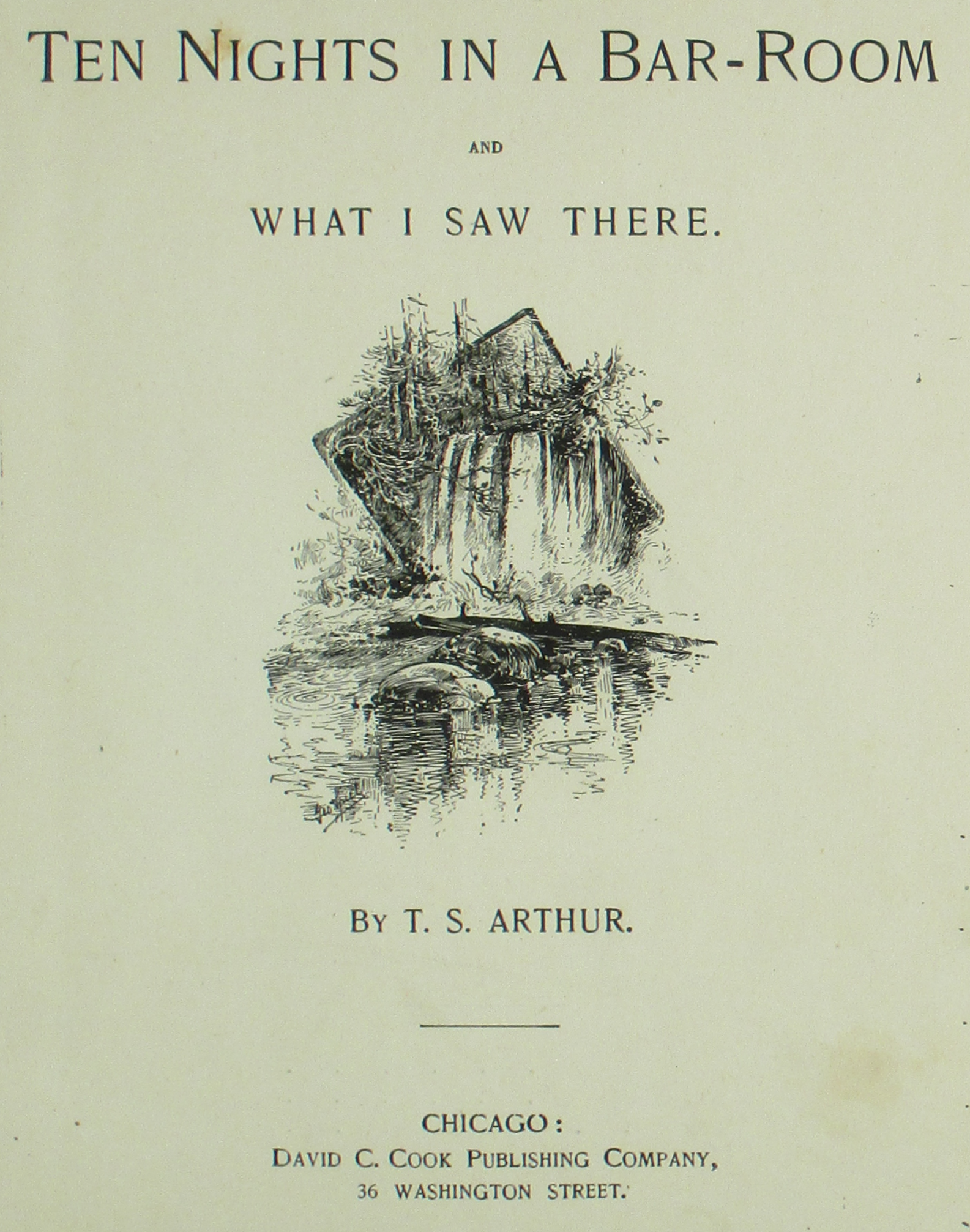
- Title page of "Ten Nights In a Bar-Room and What I Saw There"
- Author: Timothy Shay Arthur
- Language: English
- Genre: Temperance literature
- Publication date: 1854
- Publication place: United States

Ten Nights in a Bar-room and What I Saw There is an 1854 novel written by American author Timothy Shay Arthur. The book is a temperance novel, written expressly to discourage readers from drinking alcohol. It was a commercial and popular success upon its release and was later adapted into other media.

== Plot ==
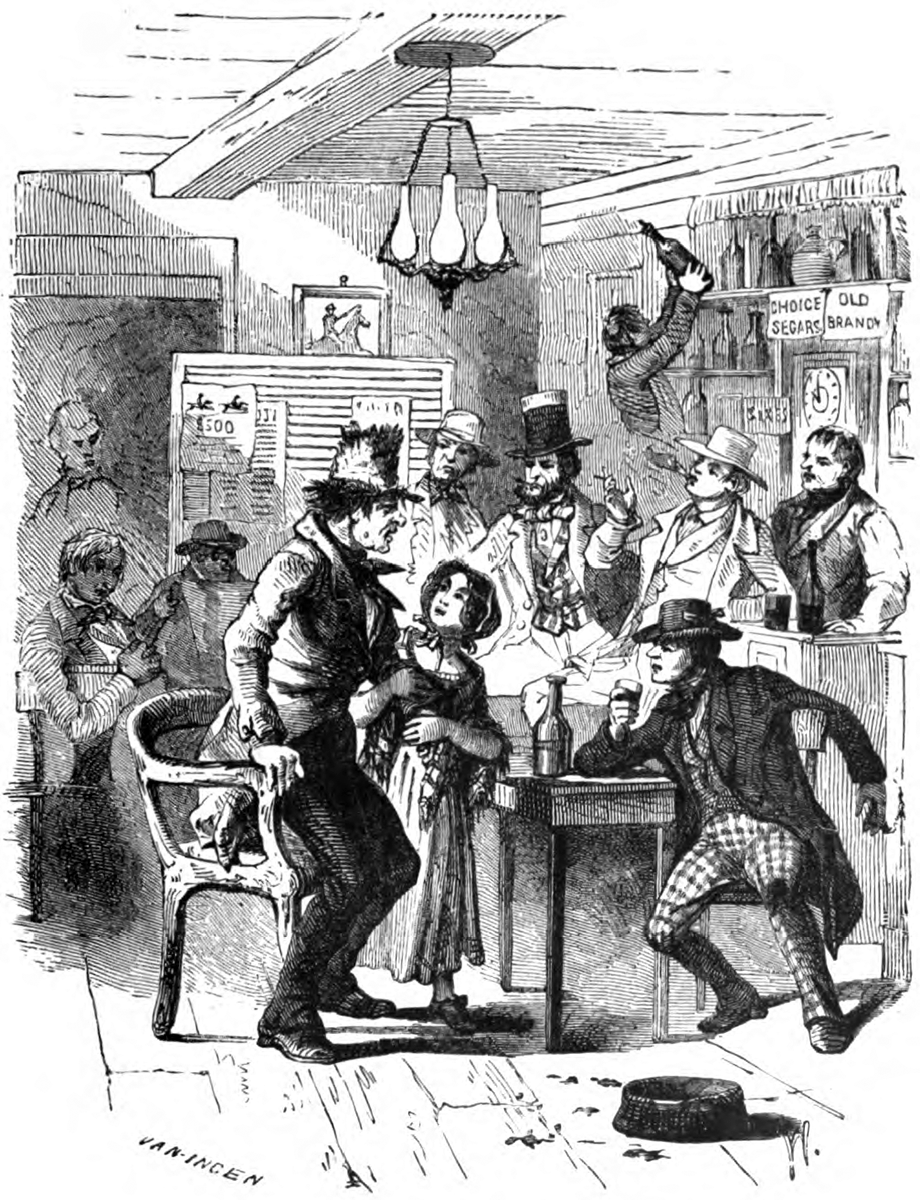
Illustration: "Come, Father! Won't You Come Home?" from an 1882 edition of Ten Nights in a Bar-room

The novel is presented by an unnamed narrator who makes an annual visit to the fictional town of Cedarville. On his first visit, he stops at the new tavern, the Sickle and Sheaf. The owner, Simon Slade, is a former miller who gave up the trade for the more lucrative tavern. The business is a family affair, with Slade's wife Ann, son Frank, and daughter Flora assisting him. The narrator also observes the town drunk, Joe Morgan. The father of a loving wife and family, he meets his moral downfall when introduced to alcohol. Morgan quickly becomes an alcoholic and spends most of his time at a bar.

One day, his daughter begs him to return to his family. He initially ignores her desires until she is hit in the head by a flying glass as she goes to retrieve her father. Slade had initially thrown the tumbler at Morgan so, to a degree, her death is on his hands. On her deathbed, the daughter begs Morgan to abandon alcohol, to which he agrees. The novel progresses through the ruinous fall of more characters all at the hands of hard drink and other vices (gambling becomes another major reform notion in the text). Shay spends some time discussing corruption in politics with the corrupt "rum party" candidate from Cedarville, Judge Lyman. The narrator continually notes how even the drinkers in the story call for "the Maine Law" which will prohibit alcohol from being so temptingly available.

The novel closes with the death of Simon Slade, already mutilated from an earlier riotous sequence of murders and mob mentality, at the hands of his son. The two had gotten into a drunken argument and Frank strikes his father in the head with a bottle. In the final scene the narrator sees the post with the once pristine and now gross and rotten Sickle and Sheaf totem chopped down after the town's moral fiber finally showed itself in a series of resolutions that led to the destruction of all the alcohol on the premises.

== Analysis ==
In addition to its advocacy of temperance, the book is also significant because of its promotion of the Cult of Domesticity and prohibition. Arthur used the book to argue that women needed to steer men to the path of morality to protect the home. Nothing was as dangerous to morality as alcohol, so its use needed to be restricted by women. The book is the first work to openly call for prohibition and was a popular temperance melodrama.

== Response ==
Ten Nights in a Bar-room was a financial success for Arthur and became the second most popular book of the Victorian era, following Uncle Tom's Cabin. The novel was easily transferred to play format, so it was frequently used to promote prohibition to large audiences. The play based on the novel continued to be popular even after the end of prohibition in the United States, although it was usually presented as a parody.

Actor William W. Pratt adapted the play for the stage. The play was first performed by Bidwell and Marston's Company as early as July 1858 at Hampden Hall in Springfield, Massachusetts. It subsequently toured to Broadway where it played at Purdy's National Theatre for a week of performances in August 1858. While not popular in major urban centers, the play became the most well known temperance play in 19th century America, and, other than Uncle Tom's Cabin, was the most popular play in the United States during the 19th century outside of big cities. The play's version of the novel's story was the basis for the many film adaptations that were made.

Among its film adaptations was a 1910 silent film starring Frank H. Crane and Marie Eline (now lost), a 1913 adaptation by Lee Beggs with a cast including Gladys Egan, a 1921 film directed by Oscar Apfel, a 1926 film directed by Roy Calnek with an all-black cast including Charles Sidney Gilpin, and a 1931 film starring William Farnum as Joe Morgan and Tom Santschi as Simon Slade.
