= William W. Pratt =

American playwright and actor

William W. Pratt (c. 1821 – November 28, 1864) was an American playwright and actor. His is best remembered for his temperance play Ten Nights in a Bar-Room which was adapted from the novel by Timothy Shay Arthur. According to theatre historian Gerald Bordman, this play, while never popular in major urban centers, was second only to Uncle Tom's Cabin in its popularity among broader American audiences in the 19th century.

== Life and career ==
William W. Prat was born in Boston, Massachusetts in c. 1821. By 1852 he was performing on the stage as a member of J. W. Lanergan's company in his home state. In 1855 he performed in the show Highlife in Boston at the Howard Athenaeum. In 1856 he was a member of a stock theatre company in Hartford, Connecticut. In 1857 he was a member of Annie Senter's theatre company with his repertoire with this company including the part of Sir William Fondlove in The Love Chase by James Sheridan Knowles.

By the Spring of 1858 he was working as the manager of Bidwell & Marston's Company (BMC) which was in residence at Lancaster Hall in Portland, Maine. His play Ten Nights in a Bar-Room, adapted from Timothy Shay Arthur's 1854 novel Ten Nights in a Bar-Room and What I Saw There, was given by the BMC company at Hampden Hall in Springfield, Massachusetts in July 1858 with Yankee Locke leading the cast as Sample Twichell and Pratt taking on the role of Mr. Romaine. It played at the National Theatre in Boston after the close of the New York run. While never popular in major urban centers, it had a tremendously successful life as a road show to smaller cities with multiple different companies touring in the play simultaneously for decades.

Pratt continued to oversee the touring production of his play for the remainder of his life. He died of kidney failure after an illness of a few days at the New England House in Rochester, New York on November 28, 1864. He had traveled to that city with his theatre troupe for performances of his play.
