= Timothy Shay Arthur =

American novelist

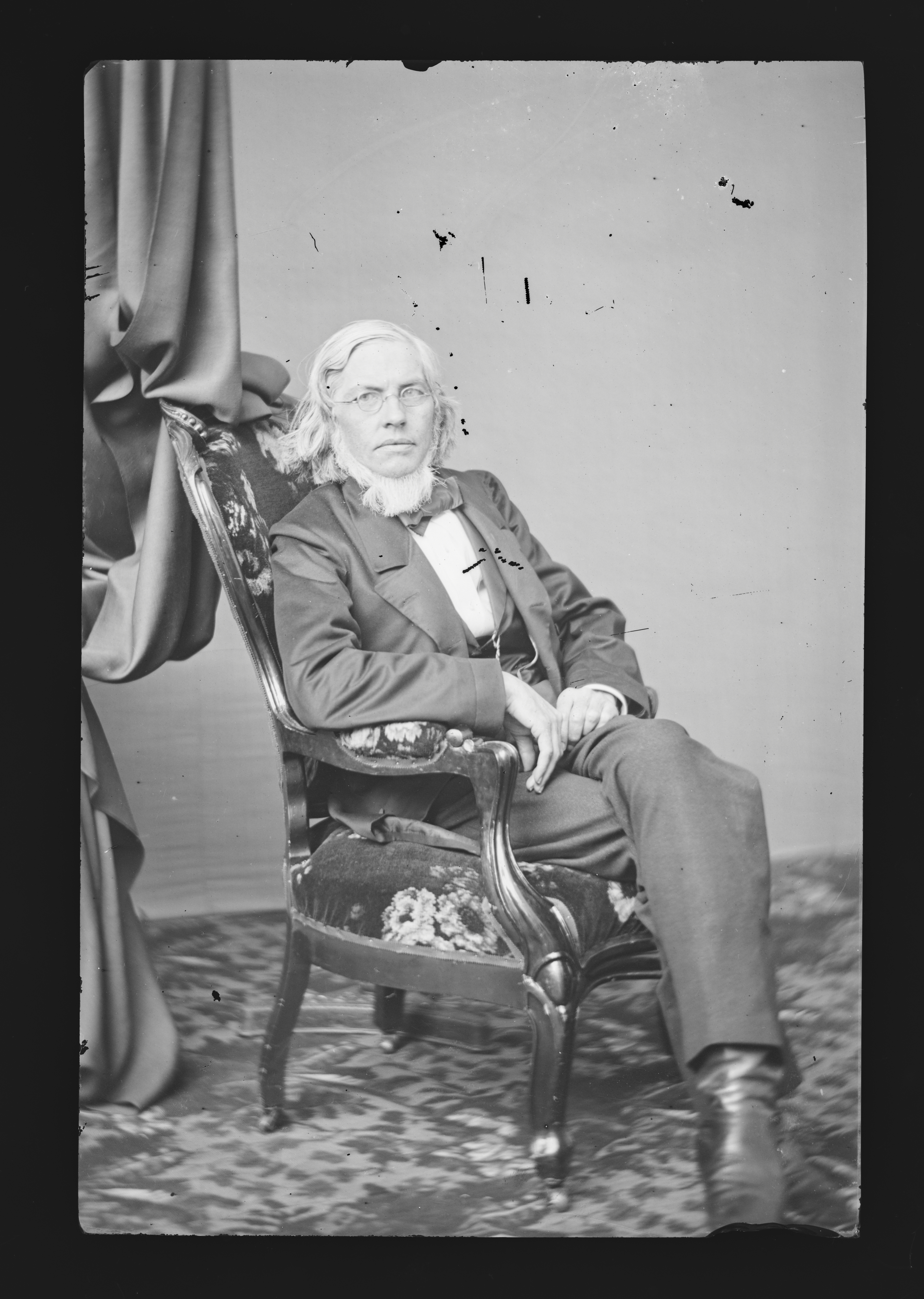
Arthur photographed by Matthew Brady

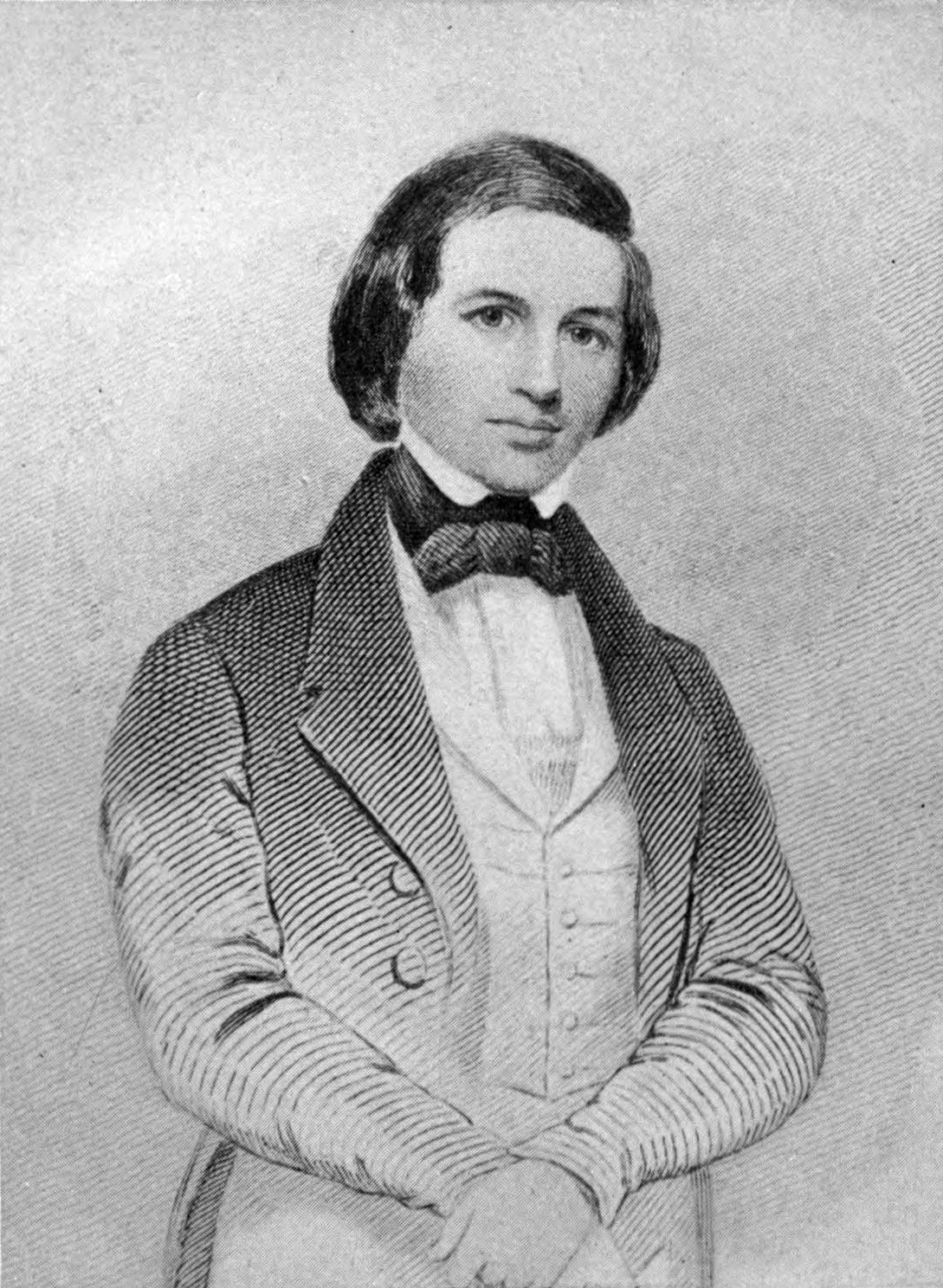
Timothy Shay Arthur

Timothy Shay Arthur (June 6, 1809 – March 6, 1885), known as T. S. Arthur, was a 19th-century American writer. He is best known for his temperance novel Ten Nights in a Bar-Room and What I Saw There (1854), which contributed to negative public views of alcohol.

His stories, written with compassion and sensitivity, articulated and spread values and ideas that were associated with “respectable middle class“ life in America. He also believed greatly in the transformative and restorative power of love as is shown in one of his stories, "An Angel in Disguise".

He was also the author of dozens of stories for Godey's Lady's Book, the most popular American monthly magazine in the antebellum era, and he published and edited his own Arthur's Home Magazine, a periodical in the Godey's model, for many years.

== Biography ==
Born in Newburgh, New York, Arthur lived as a child in Fort Montgomery, New York. By 1820, Arthur's father, who was a miller, had relocated to Baltimore, Maryland, where Arthur briefly attended local schools. At age fourteen, Arthur apprenticed to a tailor, but poor eyesight and a general lack of aptitude for physical labor led him to seek other work. He then found employment with a wholesale merchandiser and later as an agent for an investment concern, a job that took him briefly to Louisville, Kentucky. Otherwise, he lived as a young adult in Baltimore.

Smitten by literature, Arthur devoted as much time as he could to reading and fledgling attempts to write. By 1830, he had begun to appear in local literary magazines. That year he contributed poems under his own name and pseudonyms to a gift book called The Amethyst. Also during this time he participated in an informal literary coterie called the Seven Stars (the name was drawn from that of the tavern in which they met), whose members also included Edgar Allan Poe.

=== Professional success of T. S. Arthur ===
The 1830s saw Arthur mount a number of efforts to become a professional author and publisher. All failed, but collectively they gave Arthur numerous chances to hone his craft. In 1838 he co-published The Baltimore Book, a gift book that included a short tale contributed by Poe called "Slope." Toward the end of the decade, Arthur published in ephemeral format a novel called Insubordination that in 1842 appeared in hardcover. In 1840 he wrote a series of newspaper articles on the Washingtonian Temperance Society, a local organization formed by working-class artisans and mechanics to counter the life-ruining effects of drink. The articles were widely reprinted and helped fuel the establishment of Washingtonian groups across the country. Arthur’s newspaper sketches were collected in book form as Six Nights with the Washingtonians (1842). Six Nights went through many editions and helped establish Arthur in the public eye as an author associated with the temperance movement.

1840 also saw Arthur place his first short tale in Godey's Lady's Book. Called "Tired of Housekeeping," its subject is a middle-class family who struggles to supervise recalcitrant cooks and servants. Encouraged by his success, Arthur moved to Philadelphia in 1841 to be near the offices of America’s most popular home magazines. He continued to write tales for Godey’s and other periodicals. Almost yearly he issued collected editions of his tales and published novel-length narratives as well. He also authored children's stories, conduct manuals, a series of state histories, and even an income-tax primer. Interested in publishing a magazine under his own name, he launched (after several aborted efforts) the monthly Arthur’s Home Magazine in 1852. Helped by a very capable assistant, Virginia Townsend, the magazine survived until several years after Arthur’s death in 1885. The magazine featured Arthur’s own tales and other original fare, as well as articles and stories reprinted from other sources. In 1854, for example, Arthur published, apparently with permission, Charles Dickens' Hard Times.

1854 was also the year Arthur published Ten Nights in a Bar-Room. The story of a small-town miller (perhaps based on Arthur's father) who gives up his trade to open a tavern, the novel’s narrator is an infrequent visitor who over the course of several years traces the physical and moral decline of the proprietor, his family, and the town’s citizenry due to alcohol. The novel sold well, but insinuated itself in the public consciousness largely on the basis of a very popular stage version that appeared soon after the book. The play remained in continuous production well into the 20th century when at least two movie versions were made.

Arthur died on March 6, 1885, age 75, at his home in Philadelphia; his death was attributed to "kidney troubles". He is buried at The Woodlands.

== Critical appreciation ==
Arthur enjoyed great popularity while he lived, but was not well regarded by the era’s literati. His old acquaintance Poe, for example, wrote in Graham's Magazine that Arthur was "uneducated and too fond of mere vulgarities to please a refined taste." An unsigned article in 1873 claimed that "the world is the better for his having lived" and his social reform writings, while also admitting that "men of literary pretensions take pride in sneering at Mr. Arthur's writings, and declaring that they never read them".

Arthur thought stories should impart beneficial life lessons by means of plainly written, realistically depicted scenes. Though often marked by moralism and sentimentalism, Arthur's writing in Ten Nights in a Bar-Room is both brisk and poignant. Many readers in his time found him relevant, helpful, reassuring, and compelling.

== Works ==
Periodicals:

- The Monument (1838–39)
- Arthur's Magazine (1844–46)
- Arthur's Home Magazine (1852–1898)
- Graham's Magazine (1849)

Tale Collections and Novels:

- The Widow Morrison: A Leaf the Book of Human Life (1841)
- Insubordination; or, The Shoemaker's Daughters: An American Story of Real Life (1842)
- The Ruined Gamester; or, Two Eras in My Life: An Autobiographical Romance (anon.) (1842)
- The Seamstress: A Tale of the Times (anon.) (1842)
- Six Nights with the Washingtonians: A Series of Original Temperance Tales (1842)
- The Story Book for Boys and Girls (1842)
- Tired of Housekeeping (1842)
- Bell Martin; or, The Heiress: An American Story of Real Life (1843)
- Fanny Dale; or, The First Year of Marriage (1843)
- The Ladies' Fair (1843)
- The Little Pilgrims: A Sequel to The Tailor's Apprentice (1843)
- Making a Sensation; and Other Tales (1843)
- The Ruined Family; and Other Tales (1843)
- The Stolen Wife: An American Romance (anon.) (1843)
- Sweethearts and Wives; or, Before and After Marriage (1843)
- The Tailor's Apprentice: A Story of Cruelty and Oppression (1843)
- The Two Merchants; or, Solvent and Insolvent (1843)
- The Village Doctors; and Other Tales (1843)
- Cecilia Howard; or, The Young Lady who had Finished her Education (1844)
- Family Pride; or, The Palace and the Poor-House (1844)
- Hints and Helps for the Home Circle; or, The Mother's Friend (1844)
- Hiram Elwood, the Banker; or, Like Father, Like Son (1844)
- The Lady at Home; or, Leaves from the Every-Day Book of an American Woman (pseud. Mrs. Mary Elmwood) (1844)
- The Martyr Wife: a Domestic Romance (1844)
- Prose Fictions, Written for the Illustration of True Principles in their Bearing upon Every-Day Life (1844)
- Temperance Tales (1844)
- The Two Sisters; or Life's Changes (anon.) (1844)
- Anna Milnor: The Young Lady Who Was Not Punctual; and Other Stories (1845)
- The Club Room; and Other Temperance Tales (1845)
- The Heiress: A Novel (1845)
- Madeline; or, A Daughter's Love, and Other Tales (1845)
- The Maiden: A Story for My Young Countrywomen (1845)
- The Two Husbands; and Other Tales (1845)
- The Wife: A Story for My Young Countrywomen (1845)
- The Mother (1846)
- Random Recollections of an Old Doctor (1846)
- The Beautiful Widow (1847)
- Keeping Up Appearances; or, A Tale for the Rich and the Poor (1847)
- Riches Have Wings; or, A Tale for the Rich and Poor (1847)
- The Young Music Teacher; and Other Tales (1847)
- Agnes; or, The Possessed. A Revelation of Mesmerism (1848)
- Debtor and Creditor: A Tale of the Times (1848)
- Love in a Cottage (1848)
- Married and Single; or, Marriage and Celibacy Contrasted in a Series of Domestic Pictures (1848)
- Making Haste to be Rich; or, The Temptation and Fall (1848)
- Retiring from Business; or, The Rich Man's Error (1848)
- Rising in the World; or, A Tale for the Rich and Poor (1848)
- Temptations: A Story for the Reformed (1848)
- Love in High Life: A Story of the 'Upper Ten' (1849)
- Wreaths of Friendship: A Gift for the Young (1849)
- Alice Melville; or, The Indiscretion (1850)
- All For the Best; or, The Old Peppermint Man (1850)
- The Debtor's Daughter; or, Life and Its Changes (1850)
- The Divorced Wife (1850)
- Golden Grains from Life’s Harvest Field (1850)
- Illustrated Temperance Tales (1850)
- The Lady at Home; or, Leaves from the Every-Day Book of an American Woman (1850)
- The Orphan Children: A Tale of Cruelty and Oppression (1850)
- Out in the World: A Novel (1850)
- Pride and Prudence; or, The Married Sisters (1850)
- Sketches of Life and Character (1850)
- True Riches; and Other Tales (1850)
- The Two Brides (1850)
- The Young Artist; or, The Dream of Italy (1850)
- Lessons in Life, for All Who Will Read Them (1851)
- The Lights and Shadows of Real Life (1851)
- Off-Hand Sketches (1851)
- Stories for Young Housekeepers (1851)
- The Tried and the Tempted (1851)
- The Two Wives (1851)
- The Way to Prosper; or, In Union There is Strength, and Other Tales (1851)
- Woman's Trials (1851)
- Words For the Wise (1851)
- Cedardale; or, the Peacemakers: A Story of Village Life (1852)
- Heart-Histories and Life Pictures (1852)
- Married Life: Its Shadows and Sunshine (1852)
- Lucy Sanford (1852)
- Maggy's Baby; and Other Stories (1852)
- Mary Ellis; or, The Runaway Match (1852)
- Mary Moreton; or, The Broken Promise (1852)
- Uncle Ben's New Year's Gift; and Other Stories (1852)
- Who is Greatest?; and Other Stories (1852)
- The Wounded Boy; and Other Stories (1852)
- Before and After the Election; or, The Political Experiences of Mr. Patrick Murphy (1853)
- Finger Posts on the Way of Life (1853)
- Home Lights and Shadows (1853)
- The Home Mission (1853)
- The Iron Rule; or, Tyranny in the Household (1853)
- Haven't Time and Don't Be in a Hurry; and Other Stories (1853)
- Heart Histories and Life Pictures (1853)
- Home Lights and Shadows (1853)
- The Home Mission (1853)
- Leaves from the Book of Human Life (1853)
- The Lost Children; and Other Stories (1853)
- The Old Man's Bride; or, The Lesson of the Day (1853)
- Shadows and Sunbeams (1853)
- Sparing to Spend; or, The Loftons and Pinkertons (1853)
- Trials of a Needlewoman (1853)
- True Riches; or, Wealth Without Wings (1853)
- The Angel of the Household (1854)
- Home Scenes and Home Influence: A Series of Tales and Sketches (1854)
- The Lady at Home; or, Happiness in the Household (1854)
- Pierre, the Organ Boy (1854)
- Ten Nights in a Bar-Room and What I Saw There (1854)
- Trials and Confessions of an American Housekeeper (1854)
- The Year After Marriage (1854)
- The Good Time Coming (1855)
- Steps to Heaven (1855)
- The Three Eras of a Woman's Life: The Maiden, the Wife, and the Mother (1855)
- Trial and Triumph; or, Firmness in the Household (1855)
- Women's Trials; or, Tales and Sketches from Real Life (1855)
- The Fireside Angel (1856)
- The Mother’s Rule; or, The Right Way and the Wrong Way (1856)
- Our Homes: Their Cares and Duties, Joys and Sorrows (1856)
- What Can Woman Do? (1856)
- The Angel and the Demon: A Tale of Modern Spiritualism (1858)
- The Hand but Not the Heart; or, The Life-Trials of Jessie Loring (1858)
- The Smuggler's Daughter; and Other Tales (1858)
- The Withered Heart (1858)
- Lizzy Glenn: or, The Trials of a Seamstress (1859)
- Seed-Time and Harvest; or, Whatsoever a Man Soweth, That Shall He Also Reap (1859)
- Trials and Confessions of a House-Keeper (1859)
- The Ways of Providence; or 'He Doeth All Things Well' (1859)
- The Allen House, or Twenty Years Ago and Now (1860)
- The Poor Woodcutter, and Other Stories (1860)
- Nothing but Money (1861) in Arthur’s Home Magazine, (1865) in book form
- Hidden Wings, and Other Stories (1864)
- Sowing the Wind, and Other Stories (1864)
- Sunshine at Home, and Other Stories (1864)
- Light on Shadowed Pasts (1864)
- Home-Heroes, Saints, and Martyrs (1865)
- What Came Afterward: A Novel (1865)
- The Lost Bride; or, The Astrologer's Prophecy (1866)
- Our Neighbors in the Corner House: A Novel (1866)
- Blind Nellie's Boy, and Other Stories (1867)
- Lights and Shadows of Real Life (1867)
- The Son of My Friend (1867)
- After A Shadow; and Other Stories (1868)
- Not Anything for Peace; and Other Stories (1868)
- After the storm (1869)
- The Peacemakers; and Other Stories (1869)
- Words of Cheer for the Tempted, the Toiling, and the Sorrowing (1869)
- The Pitcher of Cool Water; and Other Stories (1870)
- Tom Blinn's Temperance Society; and Other Tales (1870)
- Rainy Day at Home (1870)
- Idle Hands; and Other Stories (1871)
- Orange Blossoms, Fresh and Faded (1871)
- The Wonderful Story of the Gentle Hand; and Other Stories (1871)
- Cast Adrift (1872)
- Three Years in a Man-Trap (1872)
- Woman to the Rescue (1874)
- Danger; or, Wounded in the House of a Friend (1875)
- Heroes of the Household (1875)
- Little Gems from the Children's Hour (1875)
- The Bar-Rooms at Brantley; or, The Great Hotel Speculation (1877)
- Grappling the Monster; or, The Cure and Curse of Strong Drink (1877)
- The Wife's Engagement Ring (1877)
- Woman to the Rescue (1877)
- Temperance Stories for the Young (1878)
- The Strike at Tivoli Mills, and What Came of It (1879)
- Window Curtains (1880)
- Saved as by Fire (1881)
- Off-Hand Sketches, a Little Dashed with Humor (1885)
- The Two Wives; or, Lost and Won (1885)
- Stories for Parents (1885)
- Death-Dealing Gold; or, The Miser’s Fate (1890)

Tale Collections and Gift Books edited by Arthur:

- The Baltimore Book (1838) (ed. with W. H. Carpenter)
- The Snow Flake: A Gift for Innocence and Beauty (1846)
- A Christmas Box for the Sons and Daughters of Temperance (1847)
- Our Children: How Shall We Save Them (1850) (ed. under the name James Nack)
- The Brilliant: A Gift Book for 1850 (1850)
- The Sons of Temperance Offering for 1850
- The Temperance Gift (1854)
- The Temperance Offering for All Seasons (1854)
- Friends and Neighbors; or Two Ways of Living in the World (1856)
- The Mother’s Rule; or, the Right Way and the Wrong Way (1856)
- Our Homes: Their Cares and Duties, Joys and Sorrows (1856)
- The Wedding Guest; a Friend of the Bride and Groom (1856)
- The True Path, and How to Walk Therein (1858)
- My Primer (1877) (ed. under the name "Uncle Herbert")

Non-fiction:

- Advice to Young Ladies on their Duties and Conduct in Life (1848)
- Advice to Young Men on their Duties and Conduct in Life (1848)
- Steps Toward Heaven; or, Religion in Common Life: A Series of Lay Sermons for Converts in the Great Awakening (1858)
- Growler’s Income Tax (1864)
- Adventures by Sea and Land; or, Perils and Hair-Breadth Escapes of Travelers in Every Part of the World (1890)

State Histories edited by Arthur and W. H. Carpenter:

- The History of Virginia from its Earliest Settlement to the Present Time (1852)
- The History of Pennsylvania from its Earliest Settlement to the Present Time (1857)
- The History of Ohio from its Earliest Settlement to the Present Time (1858)
- The History of New York from its Earliest Settlement to the Present Time (1858)
- The History of Kentucky from its Earliest Settlement to the Present Time (1858)
- The History of New Jersey from its Earliest Settlement to the Present Time (1858)
- The History of Georgia, from its Earliest Settlement to the Present Time (1869)
- The History of Illinois from its Earliest Settlement to the Present Time (1869)
- The History of Vermont from its Earliest Settlement to the Present Time (1872)
