= List of American films of 1928 =

American films released in 1928

More than 640 American feature films were released in 1928. The American film industry was undergoing the transition to sound and released a mixture of sound and silent films during the year.

Wings won the Academy Award for Outstanding Picture at the 1st Academy Awards, presented on May 16, 1929.

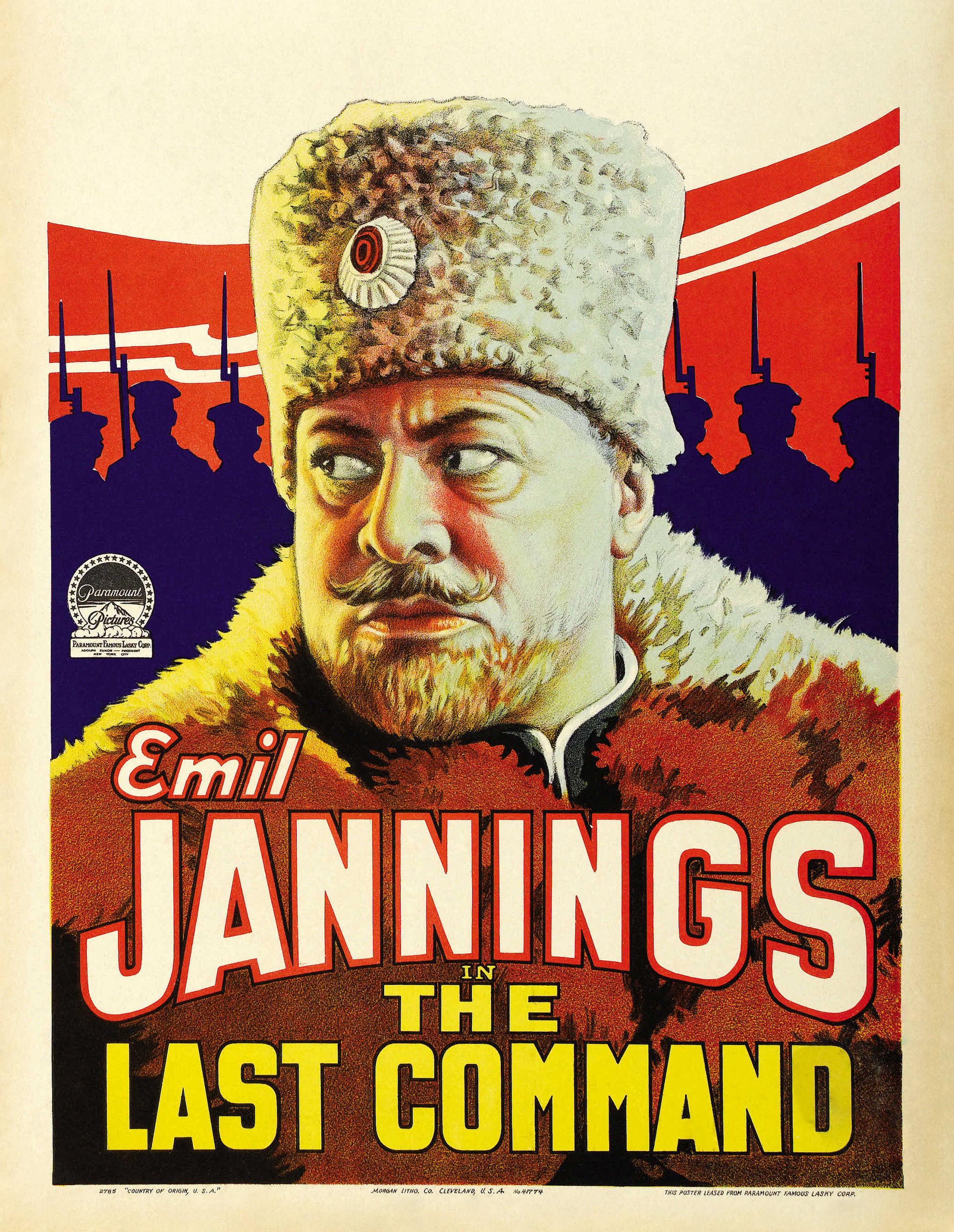
The Last Command starring Emil Jannings.

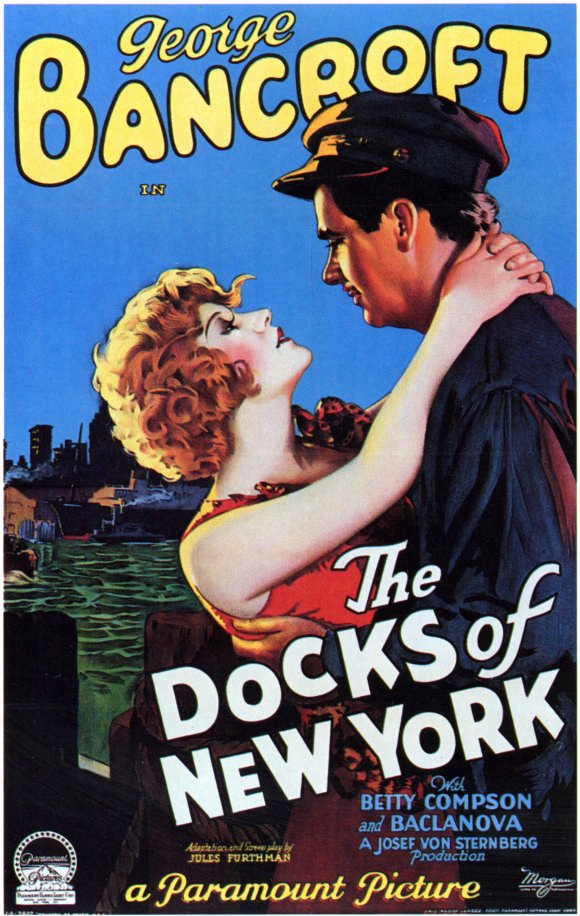
The Docks of New York starring George Bancroft.

== A-B ==
Title	Director	Cast	Genre	Notes
Abie's Irish Rose	Victor Fleming	Charles "Buddy" Rogers, Nancy Carroll, Jean Hersholt	Comedy	Paramount
Across the Atlantic	Howard Bretherton	Monte Blue, Edna Murphy, Burr McIntosh	Drama	Warner Bros.
Across to Singapore	William Nigh	Ramón Novarro, Joan Crawford, Ernest Torrence	Romance, Drama	MGM
The Actress	Sidney Franklin	Norma Shearer, Owen Moore, Gwen Lee	Drama	MGM
The Adorable Cheat	Burton L. King	Lila Lee, Reginald Sheffield	Romance	Chesterfield
Adoration	Frank Lloyd	Billie Dove, Antonio Moreno	Drama	First National
The Adventurer	Viktor Tourjansky	Tim McCoy, Dorothy Sebastian	Western	MGM
After the Storm	George B. Seitz	Hobart Bosworth, Maude George	Drama	Columbia
The Air Circus	Howard Hawks, Lewis Seiler	Arthur Lake, Sue Carol	Drama	Fox
The Air Patrol	Bruce Mitchell	Al Wilson, Elsa Benham	Drama	Universal
The Albany Night Boat	Alfred Raboch	Olive Borden, Ralph Emerson	Drama	Tiffany
Alex the Great	Dudley Murphy	Richard "Skeets" Gallagher, Albert Conti	Comedy	FBO
Alias Jimmy Valentine	Jack Conway	Lionel Barrymore, William Haines	Crime	MGM
Alias the Deacon	Edward Sloman	Jean Hersholt, June Marlowe	Action	Universal
Annapolis	Christy Cabanne	Johnny Mack Brown, Jeanette Loff	Drama	Pathé Exchange
Anybody Here Seen Kelly?	William Wyler	Bessie Love, Tom Moore	Comedy	Universal
The Apache	Phil Rosen	Margaret Livingston, Warner Richmond	Drama	Columbia
The Apache Raider	Leo D. Maloney	Eugenia Gilbert, Tom London	Western	Pathé Exchange
The Arizona Cyclone	Edgar Lewis	Fred Humes, George B. French	Western	Universal
Arizona Days	J. P. McGowan	Bob Custer, Peggy Montgomery	Western	Independent
Avalanche	Otto Brower	Jack Holt, Olga Baclanova	Western	Paramount
The Avenging Rider	Wallace Fox	Tom Tyler, Frankie Darro	Western	FBO
The Avenging Shadow	Ray Taylor	Margaret Morris, LeRoy Mason	Action	Pathé Exchange
The Awakening	Victor Fleming	Vilma Bánky, Louis Wolheim	Drama	United Artists
The Baby Cyclone	A. Edward Sutherland	Lew Cody, Aileen Pringle	Comedy	MGM
Baby Mine	Robert Z. Leonard	Karl Dane, George K. Arthur, Charlotte Greenwood	Comedy	MGM
Bachelor's Paradise	George Archainbaud	Sally O'Neil, Ralph Graves, Eddie Gribbon	Drama	Tiffany
The Ballyhoo Buster	Richard Thorpe	Jay Wilsey, Peggy Shaw	Western	Pathé Exchange
The Bantam Cowboy	Louis King	Buzz Barton, Frank Rice, Nancy Drexel	Western	FBO
Bare Knees	Erle C. Kenton	Virginia Lee Corbin, Donald Keith, Jane Winton	Comedy	Gotham
The Barker	George Fitzmaurice	Milton Sills, Dorothy Mackaill	Drama	Warner Bros.
The Battle of the Sexes	D. W. Griffith	Jean Hersholt, Phyllis Haver	Drama	United Artists
Beau Broadway	Malcolm St. Clair	Lew Cody, Aileen Pringle	Drama	MGM
Beau Sabreur	John Waters	Gary Cooper, Evelyn Brent, Noah Beery	Adventure	Paramount
Beautiful But Dumb	Elmer Clifton	Patsy Ruth Miller, George E. Stone, Eileen Sedgwick	Comedy	Tiffany
Beauty and Bullets	Ray Taylor	Ted Wells, Duane Thompson	Western	Universal
Beggars of Life	William A. Wellman	Wallace Beery, Louise Brooks, Richard Arlen	Crime	Paramount
Beware of Bachelors	Roy Del Ruth	Audrey Ferris, William Collier Jr.	Comedy	Warner Bros.
Beware of Blondes	George B. Seitz	Dorothy Revier, Matt Moore	Drama	Columbia
Beware of Married Men	Archie Mayo	Irene Rich, Clyde Cook	Comedy	Warner Bros.
Beyond London Lights	Tom Terriss	Adrienne Dore, Lee Shumway	Drama	FBO
Beyond the Sierras	Nick Grinde	Tim McCoy, Polly Moran	Adventure	MGM
The Big City	Tod Browning	Lon Chaney, Betty Compson, Marceline Day	Crime	Lost film, MGM
The Big Hop	James W. Horne	Buck Jones, Jobyna Ralston	Action	Independent
The Big Killing	F. Richard Jones	Wallace Beery, Raymond Hatton	Comedy	Paramount
The Big Noise	Allan Dwan	Chester Conklin, Alice White	Comedy	First National
A Bit of Heaven	Cliff Wheeler	Bryant Washburn, Lila Lee, Otto Lederer	Drama	Independent
Bitter Sweets	Charles Hutchison	Barbara Bedford, Ralph Graves, Crauford Kent	Crime	Independent
The Black Ace	Leo D. Maloney	Don Coleman, Jeanette Loff	Western	Pathé Exchange
Black Butterflies	James W. Horne	Jobyna Ralston, Mae Busch, Robert Frazer	Drama	Independent
Black Feather	John Ince	Sally Rand, Allan Forrest, Maurice Costello	Drama	Independent
The Black Pearl	Scott Pembroke	Lila Lee, Ray Hallor	Mystery	Rayart
Blindfold	Charles Klein	Lois Moran, George O'Brien	Drama	Fox
Blockade	George B. Seitz	Anna Q. Nilsson, Wallace MacDonald	Drama	FBO
A Blonde for a Night	E. Mason Hopper, F. McGrew Willis	Marie Prevost, Franklin Pangborn	Comedy	Pathé Exchange
The Blue Danube	Paul Sloane	Leatrice Joy, Joseph Schildkraut, Nils Asther	Romance	Pathé Exchange
The Border Patrol	James P. Hogan	Harry Carey, Phillips Smalley	Western	Pathé Exchange
The Boss of Rustler's Roost	Leo D. Maloney	Don Coleman, Ben Corbett	Western	Pathé Exchange
The Branded Man	Scott Pembroke	Charles Delaney, June Marlowe	Western	Rayart
The Branded Sombrero	Lambert Hillyer	Buck Jones, Leila Hyams	Western	Fox
Breed of the Sunsets	Wallace Fox	Bob Steele, Nancy Drexel	Western	FBO
The Bride of the Colorado	Elmer Clifton	John Boles, Donal Blossom	Western	Pathé Exchange
Bringing Up Father	Jack Conway	Marie Dressler, Polly Moran	Comedy	MGM
Broadway Daddies	Fred Windemere	Jacqueline Logan, Alec B. Francis	Comedy	Columbia
Broken Barriers	Burton L. King	Helene Costello, Gaston Glass, Joseph W. Girard	Drama	Independent
The Broken Mask	James P. Hogan	Cullen Landis, Barbara Bedford	Drama	Independent
The Bronc Stomper	Leo D. Maloney	Don Coleman, Ben Corbett	Western	Pathé Exchange
Brotherly Love	Charles Reisner	Karl Dane, George K. Arthur	Comedy	MGM
Buck Privates	Melville W. Brown	Lya De Putti, Malcolm McGregor	Comedy	Universal
The Bullet Mark	Stuart Paton	Gladys McConnell, Joseph W. Girard	Western	Pathé Exchange
Burning Bridges	James P. Hogan	Harry Carey, William Bailey	Western	Pathé Exchange
Burning Daylight	Charles Brabin	Milton Sills, Doris Kenyon	Adventure	First National
Burning the Wind	Herbert Blaché, Henry MacRae	Hoot Gibson, Virginia Brown Faire	Drama	Universal
Burning Up Broadway	Phil Rosen	Helene Costello, Robert Frazer	Drama	Independent
The Bushranger	Chester Withey	Tim McCoy, Ena Gregory	Western	MGM
The Butter and Egg Man	Richard Wallace	Jack Mulhall, Greta Nissen	Comedy	First National

== C-D ==
Title	Director	Cast	Genre	Notes
The Call of the Heart	Francis Ford	Joan Alden, Edmund Cobb	Western	Universal
The Cameraman	Edward Sedgwick, Buster Keaton	Buster Keaton, Marceline Day	Comedy, Romance	MGM
The Canyon of Adventure	Albert S. Rogell	Ken Maynard, Virginia Brown Faire, Eric Mayne	Western	First National
Captain Careless	Jerome Storm	Bob Steele, Mary Mayberry	Adventure	FBO
Captain Swagger	Edward H. Griffith	Rod La Rocque, Sue Carol, Richard Tucker	Crime	Pathé Exchange
The Cardboard Lover	Robert Z. Leonard	Marion Davies, Nils Asther	Comedy	MGM
Caught in the Fog	Howard Bretherton	May McAvoy, Conrad Nagel	Thriller	Warner Bros.
The Cavalier	Irvin Willat	Richard Talmadge, Barbara Bedford	Western	Tiffany
Celebrity	Tay Garnett	Robert Armstrong, Clyde Cook, Lina Basquette	Comedy	Pathé Exchange
A Certain Young Man	Hobart Henley	Ramon Novarro, Marceline Day	Romance	MGM
The Charge of the Gauchos	Albert H. Kelley	Francis X. Bushman, Jacqueline Logan	Historical	FBO. Co-production with Argentina
The Chaser	Harry Langdon	Harry Langdon, Gladys McConnell	Comedy	First National
The Cheer Leader	Alan James	Ralph Graves, Gertrude Olmstead, Shirley Palmer	Drama	Gotham
Chicago After Midnight	Ralph Ince	Ralph Ince, James Mason	Drama	FBO
Chicken A La King	Henry Lehrman	Nancy Carroll, George Meeker	Comedy	Fox
Chinatown Charlie	Charles Hines	Louise Lorraine, Harry Gribbon	Comedy	First National
The Chorus Kid	Howard Bretherton	Virginia Brown Faire, Bryant Washburn, Hedda Hopper	Comedy	Independent
The Circus	Charles Chaplin	Charles Chaplin, Merna Kennedy	Comedy, Adventure	United Artists
The Circus Kid	George B. Seitz	Frankie Darro, Joe E. Brown	Drama	FBO
Circus Rookies	Edward Sedgwick	Karl Dane, George K. Arthur	Comedy	MGM
The City of Purple Dreams	Duke Worne	Barbara Bedford, Robert Frazer, David Torrence	Drama	Rayart
The Clean-Up Man	Ray Taylor	Ted Wells, Peggy O'Day	Western	Universal
Clearing the Trail	B. Reeves Eason	Hoot Gibson, Dorothy Gulliver	Western	Universal
Clothes Make the Woman	Tom Terriss	Eve Southern, Walter Pidgeon	Drama	Tiffany
The Cloud Dodger	Bruce M. Mitchell	Al Wilson, Gloria Grey	Comedy	Universal
Code of the Air	James P. Hogan	Kenneth Harlan, June Marlowe	Drama	Independent
The Code of the Scarlet	Harry Joe Brown	Ken Maynard, Gladys McConnell	Western	First National
The Cohens and the Kellys in Paris	William Beaudine	J. Farrell MacDonald, Kate Price	Comedy	Universal
Companionate Marriage	Erle C. Kenton	Betty Bronson, William Welsh	Drama	First National
Comrades	Cliff Wheeler	Donald Keith, Helene Costello	Drama	Independent
Confessions of a Wife	Albert H. Kelley	Helene Chadwick, Walter McGrail	Drama	Independent
Coney Island	Ralph Ince	Lois Wilson, Eugene Strong	Drama	FBO
Conquest	Roy Del Ruth	Monte Blue, H. B. Warner	Drama	Warner Bros.
The Cop	Donald Crisp	William Boyd, Jacqueline Logan	Drama	Pathé Exchange
The Cossacks	George W. Hill; Clarence Brown	John Gilbert, Renée Adorée	Adventure	MGM
The Count of Ten	James Flood	Charles Ray, Jobyna Ralston	Drama	Universal
Court Martial	George B. Seitz	Jack Holt, Betty Compson	Action	Columbia
The Cowboy Cavalier	Richard Thorpe	Buddy Roosevelt, Olive Hasbrouck, Charles K. French	Western	Pathé Exchange
The Cowboy Kid	Clyde Carruth	Rex Bell, Brooks Benedict	Western	Fox
Craig's Wife	William C. deMille	Irene Rich, Warner Baxter	Drama	Pathé Exchange
The Crash	Edward F. Cline	Milton Sills, Thelma Todd	Drama	First National
Crashing Through	Tom Buckingham	Jack Padjan, Sally Rand, Tom Santschi	Western	Pathé Exchange
The Crimson Canyon	Ray Taylor	Ted Wells, Lotus Thompson	Western	Universal
The Crimson City	Archie Mayo	Myrna Loy, Leila Hyams	Drama	Warner Bros.
Crooks Can't Win	George M. Arthur	Ralph Lewis, Thelma Hill	Drama	FBO
The Crowd	King Vidor	Eleanor Boardman, James Murray	Drama	MGM
Danger Patrol	Duke Worne	William Russell, Virginia Brown Faire	Action	Rayart
The Danger Rider	Henry MacRae	Hoot Gibson, Monte Montague	Western	Universal
Danger Street	Ralph Ince	Warner Baxter, Martha Sleeper	Drama	FBO
Daredevil's Reward	Eugene Forde	Tom Mix, Natalie Joyce	Western	Fox
Dead Man's Curve	Richard Rosson	Douglas Fairbanks Jr., Sally Blane	Action	FBO
The Desert Bride	Walter Lang	Betty Compson, Allan Forrest	Drama	Columbia
Desperate Courage	Richard Thorpe	Hal Taliaferro, Olive Hasbrouck	Western	Pathé Exchange
Detectives	Chester M. Franklin	Karl Dane, George K. Arthur, Marceline Day	Comedy	MGM
The Devil's Cage	Wilfred Noy	Pauline Garon, Ruth Stonehouse, Donald Keith	Drama	Independent
Devil Dogs	Fred Windemere	Pauline Curley, Stuart Holmes	Comedy	Independent
The Devil's Skipper	John G. Adolfi	Belle Bennett, Montagu Love	Drama	Tiffany
The Devil's Tower	J.P. McGowan	Buddy Roosevelt, Thelma Parr	Western	Rayart
The Devil's Trademark	James Leo Meehan	Belle Bennett, William V. Mong	Drama	FBO
Diamond Handcuffs	John P. McCarthy	Eleanor Boardman, Lawrence Gray	Drama	MGM
The Divine Woman	Victor Sjöström	Greta Garbo, Lars Hanson	Drama	MGM
The Divine Sinner	Scott Pembroke	Vera Reynolds, Nigel De Brulier, Carole Lombard	Drama	Rayart
Do Your Duty	William Beaudine	Charles Murray, Lucien Littlefield	Comedy	Warner Bros.
The Docks of New York	Josef von Sternberg	George Bancroft, Betty Compson, Olga Baclanova	Melodrama	Paramount
Dog Justice	Jerome Storm	Edward Hearn, Nita Martan	Action	FBO
Dog Law	Jerome Storm	Jules Cowles, Mary Mayberry	Action	FBO
Domestic Meddlers	James Flood	Claire Windsor, Lawrence Gray, Roy D'Arcy	Comedy	Tiffany
Domestic Troubles	Ray Enright	Clyde Cook, Louise Fazenda	Comedy	Warner Bros.
Don't Marry	James Tinling	Lois Moran, Neil Hamilton	Comedy	Fox
Doomsday	Rowland V. Lee	Florence Vidor, Gary Cooper	Drama	Paramount
The Drag Net	Josef von Sternberg	George Bancroft, Evelyn Brent, William Powell	Crime	Paramount
Dream of Love	Fred Niblo	Joan Crawford, Nils Asther	Historical drama	MGM
Dreary House	Andrew L. Stone	Edith Roberts, Margaret Livingston, Ford Sterling	Drama	Independent
Dressed to Kill	Irving Cummings	Edmund Lowe, Mary Astor	Drama	Fox
Driftin' Sands	Wallace Fox	Bob Steele, Nina Quartero	Western	FBO
Driftwood	Christy Cabanne	Don Alvarado, Marceline Day	Drama	Columbia
Drums of Love	D. W. Griffith	Mary Philbin, Lionel Barrymore	Romance	United Artists
Dry Martini	Harry d'Abbadie d'Arrast	Mary Astor, Sally Eilers	Comedy	Fox
Dugan of the Dugouts	Bobby Ray	Pauline Garon, Ernest Hilliard	Comedy	Independent

== E-F ==
Title	Director	Cast	Genre	Notes
Easy Come, Easy Go	Frank Tuttle	Richard Dix, Nancy Carroll	Comedy	Paramount
The Escape	Richard Rosson	William Russell, Virginia Valli	Drama	Fox
Excess Baggage	James Cruze	William Haines, Josephine Dunn	Comedy	MGM
Faithless Lover	Lawrence C. Windom	Eugene O'Brien, Gladys Hulette, Raymond Hackett	Drama	Independent
Fangs of Fate	Noel M. Smith	Henry Hebert, Kathleen Collins	Action	Pathé Exchange
Fangs of the Wild	Jerome Storm	Nancy Drexel, Sam Nelson	Action	FBO
The Farmer's Daughter	Arthur Rosson	Marjorie Beebe, Frank Albertson	Comedy	Fox
Fashion Madness	Louis J. Gasnier	Claire Windsor, Reed Howes	Drama	Columbia
Fazil	Howard Hawks	Charles Farrell, Greta Nissen	Drama	Fox
The Fearless Rider	Edgar Lewis	Fred Humes, Barbara Worth	Western	Universal
Feel My Pulse	Gregory La Cava	Bebe Daniels, Richard Arlen, William Powell	Romantic comedy	Paramount
The Fifty-Fifty Girl	Clarence Badger	Bebe Daniels, James Hall	Comedy	Paramount
The Fightin' Redhead	Louis King	Buzz Barton, Duane Thompson	Western	FBO
Finders Keepers	Wesley Ruggles, Otis Thayer	Laura La Plante, John Harron	Comedy	Universal
The First Kiss	Rowland V. Lee	Fay Wray, Gary Cooper	Romance	Paramount
Five and Ten Cent Annie	Roy Del Ruth	Louise Fazenda, Clyde Cook	Comedy	Warner Bros.
The Five O'Clock Girl	Robert Z. Leonard	Charles King, Marion Davies, Joel McCrea	Musical	MGM. Unfinished.
The Fleet's In	Malcolm St. Clair	Clara Bow, James Hall, Jack Oakie	Comedy	Paramount
Fleetwing	Lambert Hillyer	Barry Norton, Dorothy Janis	Drama	Fox
The Floating College	George Crone	Sally O'Neil, William Collier Jr., Georgia Hale	Comedy	Tiffany
The Flyin' Buckaroo	Richard Thorpe	Hal Taliaferro, J.P. Lockney	Western	Pathé Exchange
The Flyin' Cowboy	B. Reeves Eason	Hoot Gibson, Olive Hasbrouck	Western	Universal
Flying Romeos	Mervyn LeRoy	Charles Murray, Fritzi Ridgeway	Comedy	First National
Fools for Luck	Charles Reisner	W. C. Fields, Chester Conklin, Sally Blane	Comedy	Paramount
Forbidden Hours	Harry Beaumont	Ramon Novarro, Renée Adorée	Drama	MGM
The Foreign Legion	Edward Sloman	Norman Kerry, Lewis Stone, Mary Nolan	Adventure	Universal
Forgotten Faces	Victor Schertzinger	Clive Brook, Mary Brian	Drama	Paramount
4 Devils	F. W. Murnau	Janet Gaynor, Anders Randolf	Drama	Fox Film
The Four-Footed Ranger	Stuart Paton	Edmund Cobb, Marjorie Bonner	Western	Universal
Four Sons	John Ford	Margaret Mann, James Hall	Drama	Fox
Four Walls	William Nigh	John Gilbert, Joan Crawford	Drama	MGM
The Fourflusher	Wesley Ruggles	George J. Lewis, Marian Nixon	Comedy	Universal
Freckles	James Leo Meehan	Hobart Bosworth, Eulalie Jensen	Drama	FBO
Free Lips	Wallace MacDonald	June Marlowe, Jane Novak	Mystery	Independent
Freedom of the Press	George Melford	Lewis Stone, Marceline Day	Mystery	Universal

== G-H ==
Title	Director	Cast	Genre	Notes
Gang War	Bert Glennon	Jack Pickford, Olive Borden	Crime	FBO
The Garden of Eden	Lewis Milestone	Corinne Griffith, Louise Dresser	Drama	United Artists
The Gate Crasher	William James Craft	Glenn Tryon, Patsy Ruth Miller	Comedy	Universal
The Gateway of the Moon	John Griffith Wraith	Dolores del Río, Walter Pidgeon	Romantic comedy	Fox
Gentleman Prefer Blondes	Malcolm St. Clair	Ruth Taylor, Alice White	Comedy	Paramount
George Washington Cohen	George Archainbaud	George Jessel, Corliss Palmer	Comedy	Tiffany
The Girl He Didn't Buy	Dallas M. Fitzgerald	Pauline Garon, Rosemary Cooper	Drama	Independent
A Girl in Every Port	Howard Hawks	Victor McLaglen, Robert Armstrong, Louise Brooks	Romantic Comedy	Fox
The Girl-Shy Cowboy	Robert Lee Hough	Rex Bell, George Meeker, Patsy O'Leary	Western	Fox Film
Give and Take	William Beaudine	Jean Hersholt, Sharon Lynn	Comedy	Universal
Glorious Betsy	Alan Crosland, Gordon Hollingshead	Dolores Costello, Conrad Nagel	Drama	Warner Bros.
The Glorious Trail	Albert S. Rogell	Ken Maynard, Gladys McConnell	Western	First National
The Godless Girl	Cecil B. DeMille	Lina Basquette, Tom Keene	Drama	Pathé Exchange
Golden Shackles	Dallas M. Fitzgerald	Grant Withers, Priscilla Bonner, LeRoy Mason	Drama	Independent
Golf Widows	Erle C. Kenton	Vera Reynolds, Harrison Ford	Comedy	Columbia
The Good-Bye Kiss	Mack Sennett	Johnny Burke, Sally Eilers	Comedy	First National
Good Morning, Judge	William A. Seiter	Reginald Denny, Mary Nolan	Comedy	Universal
The Grain of Dust	George Archainbaud	Ricardo Cortez, Claire Windsor, Alma Bennett	Drama	Tiffany
Greased Lightning	Ray Taylor	Ted Wells, Betty Caldwell	Western	Universal
Green Grass Widows	Alfred Raboch	Gertrude Olmstead, Hedda Hopper	Comedy	Tiffany
The Grip of the Yukon	Ernst Laemmle	Francis X. Bushman, Neil Hamilton, June Marlowe	Western	Universal
Guardians of the Wild	Henry MacRae	Jack Perrin, Ethlyne Clair	Western	Universal
The Gun Runner	Edgar Lewis	Ricardo Cortez, Nora Lane	Thriller	Tiffany
Gypsy of the North	Scott Pembroke	Georgia Hale, Huntley Gordon	Drama	Rayart
Half a Bride	Gregory La Cava	Esther Ralston, Gary Cooper	Romance	Paramount
Hangman's House	John Ford	Victor McLaglen, June Collyer	Romance, Drama	Fox
Happiness Ahead	William A. Seiter	Colleen Moore, Edmund Lowe	Drama	First National
Harold Teen	Mervyn LeRoy	Arthur Lake, Mary Brian	Comedy	First National
The Hawk's Nest	Benjamin Christensen	Milton Sills, Doris Kenyon	Crime	First National
The Haunted House	Benjamin Christensen	Larry Kent, Thelma Todd	Comedy	First National
The Head Man	Edward F. Cline	Charlie Murray, Loretta Young	Comedy	First National
The Head of the Family	Joseph Boyle	William Russell, Virginia Lee Corbin, Alma Bennett	Comedy	Gotham
Headin' for Danger	Robert N. Bradbury	Bob Steele, Al Ferguson	Western	FBO
The Heart of Broadway	Duke Worne	Pauline Garon, Robert Agnew	Drama	Columbia
The Heart of a Follies Girl	John Francis Dillon	Billie Dove, Larry Kent	Comedy	First National
Heart to Heart	William Beaudine	Mary Astor, Lloyd Hughes	Comedy	First National
Heart Trouble	Harry Langdon	Harry Langdon, Doris Dawson	Comedy	First National
Hearts of Men	James P. Hogan	Mildred Harris, Thelma Hill, Cornelius Keefe	Drama	Independent
Hello Cheyenne	Eugene Forde	Tom Mix, Caryl Lincoln	Western	Fox
Hellship Bronson	Joseph Henabery	Noah Beery, Dorothy Davenport, Reed Howes	Adventure	Gotham
Her Summer Hero	James Dugan	Hugh Trevor, Harold Goodwin	Comedy	FBO
Hey Rube!	George B. Seitz	Hugh Trevor, Gertrude Olmstead, Ethlyne Clair	Drama	FBO
His Last Haul	Marshall Neilan	Tom Moore, Seena Owen, Alan Roscoe	Crime	FBO
His Private Life	Frank Tuttle	Adolphe Menjou, Kathryn Carver	Comedy	Paramount
His Tiger Lady	Hobart Henley	Adolphe Menjou, Evelyn Brent	Drama	Paramount
Hit of the Show	Ralph Ince	Joe E. Brown, Gertrude Olmstead	Comedy	FBO
Hold 'Em Yale	Edward H. Griffith	Rod La Rocque, Jeanette Loff	Comedy	Pathé Exchange
Home, James	William Beaudine	Laura La Plante, Charles Delaney, Joan Standing	Comedy	Universal
The Home Towners	Bryan Foy	Richard Bennett, Doris Kenyon	Comedy	Warner Bros.
Homesick	Henry Lehrman	Sammy Cohen, Marjorie Beebe	Comedy	Fox
Honeymoon	Robert A. Golden	Polly Moran, Harry Gribbon	Comedy	MGM
Honeymoon Flats	Millard Webb	George J. Lewis, Dorothy Gulliver	Comedy	Universal
Honor Bound	Alfred E. Green	George O'Brien, Estelle Taylor	Drama	Fox
Hoofbeats of Vengeance	Henry MacRae	Jack Perrin, Helen Foster	Wester	Universal
A Horseman of the Plains	Benjamin Stoloff	Tom Mix, Sally Blane	Western	Fox
Hot Heels	William James Craft	Glenn Tryon, Patsy Ruth Miller	Comedy	Universal
Hot News	Clarence Badger	Bebe Daniels, Neil Hamilton	Comedy	Paramount
The Hound of Silver Creek	Stuart Paton	Edmund Cobb, Gloria Grey	Western	Universal
The House of Scandal	King Baggot	Pat O'Malley, Dorothy Sebastian	Drama	Tiffany
The House of Shame	Burton L. King	Creighton Hale, Virginia Brown Faire, Lloyd Whitlock	Drama	Chesterfield
How to Handle Women	William James Craft	Glenn Tryon, Marian Nixon	Comedy	Universal

== I-J ==
Title	Director	Cast	Genre	Notes
In Old Arizona	Irving Cummings, Raoul Walsh	Warner Baxter, Edmund Lowe, Dorothy Burgess	Western	Fox Film
Inspiration	Bernard McEveety	George Walsh, Gladys Frazin, Marguerite Clayton	Drama	Independent
Interference	Lothar Mendes	William Powell, Evelyn Brent, Clive Brook	Drama	Paramount
Into No Man's Land	Cliff Wheeler	Tom Santschi, Betty Blythe, Crauford Kent	War drama	Independent
Isle of Lost Men	Duke Worne	Tom Santschi, Patsy O'Leary	Drama	Rayart
Jazz Mad	F. Harmon Weight	Jean Hersholt, Marian Nixon	Drama	Universal
Jazzland	Dallas M. Fitzgerald	Bryant Washburn, Vera Reynolds, Carroll Nye	Drama	Independent
Just Married	Frank R. Strayer	James Hall, Ruth Taylor	Comedy	Paramount

== K-L ==
Title	Director	Cast	Genre	Notes
King Cowboy	Robert De Lacey	Tom Mix, Sally Blane	Western	FBO
Kit Carson	Lloyd Ingraham, Alfred L. Werker	Fred Thomson, Nora Lane	Western	Paramount
Laddie Be Good	Bennett Cohen	Bill Cody, Rose Blossom	Western	Pathé Exchange
Ladies' Night in a Turkish Bath	Edward F. Cline	Dorothy Mackaill, Sylvia Ashton	Comedy	First National
Ladies of the Mob	William A. Wellman	Clara Bow, Richard Arlen, Helen Lynch, Mary Alden	Crime	Paramount
Ladies of the Night Club	George Archainbaud	Ricardo Cortez, Barbara Leonard, Lee Moran	Comedy	Tiffany
Lady Be Good	Richard Wallace	Dorothy Mackaill, Jack Mulhall	Comedy	First National
A Lady of Chance	Robert Z. Leonard	Norma Shearer, Lowell Sherman	Romance	MGM
Lady Raffles	Roy William Neill	Estelle Taylor, Roland Drew	Comedy crime	Columbia
Land of the Silver Fox	Ray Enright	Rin Tin Tin, Leila Hyams	Adventure	Warner Bros.
The Last Command	Josef von Sternberg	Emil Jannings, Evelyn Brent, William Powell	Melodrama	Paramount
The Last Warning	Paul Leni	Laura La Plante, Montagu Love, Margaret Livingston	Mystery	Universal
The Latest from Paris	Sam Wood	Norma Shearer, Ralph Forbes	Drama	MGM
Laugh, Clown, Laugh	Herbert Brenon	Lon Chaney, Loretta Young	Melodrama	MGM
The Law and the Man	Scott Pembroke	Tom Santschi, Gladys Brockwell	Drama	Rayart
Law of Fear	Jerome Storm	Sam Nelson, Albert J. Smith	Action	FBO
Law of the Mounted	J.P. McGowan	Bob Custer, Cliff Lyons, Mary Mayberry	Western	Independent
The Law of the Range	William Nigh	Tim McCoy, Joan Crawford, Rex Lease	Western	MGM
The Law's Lash	Noel M. Smith	Robert Ellis, Mary Mayberry	Western	Pathé Exchange
The Legion of the Condemned	William A. Wellman	Fay Wray, Gary Cooper	War	Paramount
The Leopard Lady	Rupert Julian	Jacqueline Logan, Alan Hale, Robert Armstrong	Drama	Pathé Exchange
Let 'Er Go Gallegher	Elmer Clifton	Frank Coghlan Jr., Harrison Ford	Comedy crime	Pathé Exchange
Life's Crossroads	Edgar Lewis	Gladys Hulette, Mahlon Hamilton	Drama	Independent
Life's Mockery	Robert F. Hill	Betty Compson, Theodore von Eltz	Drama	Independent
Lightning Speed	Robert N. Bradbury	Bob Steele, Mary Mayberry	Action	FBO
Lights of New York	Bryan Foy	Helene Costello, Cullen Landis, Eugene Pallette	Crime, Drama	Warner Bros.
Lilac Time	George Fitzmaurice, Frank Lloyd	Colleen Moore, Gary Cooper	War	Warner Bros.
Lingerie	George Melford	Alice White, Malcolm McGregor, Mildred Harris	Drama	Tiffany
The Lion and the Mouse	Lloyd Bacon	May McAvoy, Lionel Barrymore	Drama	Warner Bros.
The Little Buckaroo	Louis King	Buzz Barton, Milburn Morante	Western	FBO
The Little Shepherd of Kingdom Come	Alfred Santell	Richard Barthelmess, Molly O'Day	Drama	First National
The Little Snob	John G. Adolfi	May McAvoy, Robert Frazer	Comedy	Warner Bros.
The Little Wild Girl	Frank S. Mattison	Lila Lee, Cullen Landis	Drama	Independent
The Little Wildcat	Ray Enright	Audrey Ferris, James Murray	Comedy	Warner Bros.
The Little Yellow House	James Leo Meehan	Orville Caldwell, Martha Sleeper	Romance	FBO
Lonesome	Paul Fejös	Barbara Kent, Glenn Tryon, Fay Holderness	Romance	Universal
The Lookout Girl	Dallas M. Fitzgerald	Jacqueline Logan, Ian Keith	Mystery	Independent
Love and Learn	Frank Tuttle	Esther Ralston, Lane Chandler	Comedy	Paramount
Love Me and the World Is Mine	Ewald André Dupont	Mary Philbin, Betty Compson	Romance	Universal
Loves of an Actress	Rowland V. Lee	Pola Negri, Nils Asther	Romance	Paramount
Love Hungry	Victor Heerman	Lois Moran, Marjorie Beebe	Comedy	Fox
Love Over Night	Edward H. Griffith	Rod La Rocque, Jeanette Loff	Comedy	Pathé Exchange
The Love Thief	John McDermott	Norman Kerry, Greta Nissen, Marc MacDermott	Romance	Universal

== M-N ==
Title	Director	Cast	Genre	Notes
Mad Hour	Joseph C. Boyle	Sally O'Neil, Alice White	Drama	First National
The Magnificent Flirt	Harry d'Abbadie d'Arrast	Florence Vidor, Loretta Young	Comedy	Paramount
Making the Varsity	Cliff Wheeler	Rex Lease, Arthur Rankin, Gladys Hulette	Drama	Independent
Manhattan Cocktail	Dorothy Arzner	Nancy Carroll, Richard Arlen	Drama	Paramount
Manhattan Cowboy	J. P. McGowan	Bob Custer, Lafe McKee	Western	Independent
Manhattan Knights	Burton L. King	Barbara Bedford, Crauford Kent	Drama	Independent
Man-Made Women	Paul L. Stein	Leatrice Joy, H.B. Warner, John Boles	Comedy drama	Pathé Exchange
The Man from Headquarters	Duke Worne	Cornelius Keefe, Edith Roberts	Crime	Rayart
The Man in Hobbles	George Archainbaud	John Harron, Lila Lee, Lucien Littlefield	Comedy	Tiffany
Man in the Rough	Wallace Fox	Bob Steele, Marjorie King	Western	FBO
The Man Who Laughs	Paul Leni	Mary Philbin, Conrad Veidt	Melodrama	Universal
Marked Money	Spencer Gordon Bennet	Tom Keene, Tom Kennedy, Virginia Bradford	Action	Pathé Exchange
Marlie the Killer	Noel M. Smith	Francis X. Bushman Jr., Joseph W. Girard, Blanche Mehaffey	Action	Pathé Exchange
Marriage by Contract	James Flood	Patsy Ruth Miller, Lawrence Gray	Drama	Tiffany
Marry the Girl	Phil Rosen	Barbara Bedford, Robert Ellis, DeWitt Jennings	Drama	Independent
The Masked Angel	Frank O'Connor	Betty Compson, Wheeler Oakman	Drama	Independent
The Masks of the Devil	Victor Sjöström	John Gilbert, Alma Rubens	Drama	MGM
The Matinee Idol	Frank Capra	Bessie Love, Johnnie Walker	Romance	Columbia
The Mating Call	James Cruze	Thomas Meighan, Evelyn Brent	Drama	Paramount
Me, Gangster	Raoul Walsh	June Collyer, Don Terry, Anders Randolf	Crime	Fox
Melody of Love	Arch Heath	Walter Pidgeon, Mildred Harris, Jane Winton	Musical	Universal
The Michigan Kid	Ray Taylor	Conrad Nagel, Renée Adorée, Lloyd Whitlock	Drama	Universal
The Midnight Adventure	Duke Worne	Cullen Landis, Edna Murphy	Mystery	Rayart
Midnight Life	Scott R. Dunlap	Francis X. Bushman, Gertrude Olmstead, Edward Buzzell	Crime	Gotham
Midnight Madness	F. Harmon Weight	Clive Brook, Jacqueline Logan	Drama	Pathé Exchange
Midnight Rose	James Young	Lya De Putti, Kenneth Harlan	Crime	Universal
The Midnight Taxi	John G. Adolfi	Antonio Moreno, Myrna Loy	Melodrama	Warner Bros., part-Talkie
A Million for Love	Robert F. Hill	Reed Howes, Josephine Dunn	Crime	Independent
Modern Mothers	Phil Rosen	Helene Chadwick, Douglas Fairbanks Jr.	Drama	Columbia
Moran of the Marines	Frank R. Strayer	Richard Dix, Ruth Elder	Crime	Paramount
Mother Knows Best	John G. Blystone, Charles Judels	Madge Bellamy, Louise Dresser, Barry Norton	Drama	Fox
Mother Machree	John Ford	Belle Bennett, Neil Hamilton	Drama	Fox Film
Must We Marry?	Frank S. Mattison	Pauline Garon, Vivian Rich	Comedy	Independent
My Home Town	Scott Pembroke	Gladys Brockwell, Gaston Glass, Violet La Plante	Drama	Rayart
My Man	Archie Mayo	Fanny Brice, Edna Murphy	Comedy	Warner Bros.
The Mysterious Lady	Fred Niblo	Greta Garbo, Conrad Nagel	Romance, Drama	MGM
Name the Woman	Erle C. Kenton	Anita Stewart, Huntley Gordon	Drama	Columbia
Nameless Men	Christy Cabanne	Claire Windsor, Antonio Moreno	Drama	Tiffany
Naughty Baby	Mervyn LeRoy	Alice White, Jack Mulhall	Comedy	First National
The Naughty Duchess	Tom Terriss	Eve Southern, H. B. Warner	Mystery	Tiffany
Ned McCobb's Daughter	William J. Cowen	Irene Rich, Theodore Roberts, Robert Armstrong	Drama	Pathé Exchange
News Parade	David Butler	Nick Stuart, Sally Phipps	Comedy	Fox
The Night Bird	Fred C. Newmeyer	Reginald Denny, Corliss Palmer	Comedy	Universal
The Night Flyer	Walter Lang	William Boyd, Jobyna Ralston, Philo McCullough	Action	Pathé Exchange
A Night of Mystery	Lothar Mendes	Adolphe Menjou, Evelyn Brent	Drama	Paramount
Night Watch	Alexander Korda	Billie Dove, Paul Lukas	Drama	First National
No Other Woman	Lou Tellegen	Dolores del Río, Don Alvarado	Romance	Fox
Noah's Ark	Michael Curtiz	George O'Brien, Alois Reiser	Drama	Warner Bros.
None but the Brave	Albert Ray	Charles Morton, Sally Phipps	Comedy	Fox
The Noose	John Francis Dillon	Richard Barthelmess, Montagu Love	Drama	First National
Nothing to Wear	Erle C. Kenton	Jacqueline Logan, Theodore von Eltz	Comedy	Columbia

== O-P ==
Title	Director	Cast	Genre	Notes
Obey Your Husband	Charles J. Hunt	Gaston Glass, Dorothy Dwan, Alice Lake	Drama	Independent
Object: Alimony	Scott R. Dunlap	Lois Wilson, Ethel Grey Terry	Drama	Columbia
Oh, Kay!	Mervyn LeRoy	Colleen Moore, Lawrence Gray	Comedy	First National
The Old Code	Ben F. Wilson	Walter McGrail, Lillian Rich	Historical	Independent
The Olympic Hero	Roy William Neill	Charles Paddock, Julanne Johnston, Crauford Kent	Sports	Independent
On to Reno	James Cruze	Marie Prevost, Cullen Landis, Ned Sparks	Comedy	Pathé Exchange
On Trial	Archie Mayo	Pauline Frederick, Bert Lytell	Drama	Warner Bros.
Orphan of the Sage	Louis King	Buzz Barton, Frank Rice	Western	FBO
Our Dancing Daughters	Harry Beaumont	Joan Crawford, Nils Asther	Melodrama	MGM
Out with the Tide	Charles Hutchison	Dorothy Dwan, Cullen Landis, Crauford Kent	Drama	Independent
Outcast	William A. Seiter	Corinne Griffith, Edmund Lowe	Drama	First National
Outcast Souls	Louis Chaudet	Priscilla Bonner, Charles Delaney	Drama	Independent
Out of the Ruins	John Francis Dillon	Richard Barthelmess, Marian Nixon	Drama	First National
Painted Post	Eugene Forde	Tom Mix, Natalie Kingston	Western	Fox Film
The Painted Trail	J.P. McGowan	Buddy Roosevelt, Lafe McKee	Western	Rayart
Partners in Crime	Frank R. Strayer	Wallace Beery, Raymond Hatton, Mary Brian	Comedy	Paramount
The Passion Song	Harry O. Hoyt	Gertrude Olmstead, Noah Beery, Wild Bill Elliott	Drama	Independent
The Patriot	Ernst Lubitsch	Emil Jannings, Florence Vidor	Historical	Paramount
The Patsy	King Vidor	Marion Davies, Orville Caldwell	Comedy	MGM
Pay as You Enter	Lloyd Bacon	Louise Fazenda, Clyde Cook	Comedy	Warner Bros.
The Perfect Crime	Bert Glennon	Clive Brook, Irene Rich	Crime	FBO
A Perfect Gentleman	Clyde Bruckman	Monty Banks, Ernest Wood, Henry Barrows, Ruth Dwyer	Comedy	Pathé Exchange
The Phantom City	Albert S. Rogell	Ken Maynard, Eugenia Gilbert	Western	First National
The Phantom Flyer	Bruce M. Mitchell	Al Wilson, Buck Connors	Western	Universal
Phantom of the Range	James Dugan	Tom Tyler, Frankie Darro	Western	FBO
The Phantom of the Turf	Duke Worne	Helene Costello, Rex Lease, Forrest Stanley	Action	Rayart
Phyllis of the Follies	Ernst Laemmle	Alice Day, Matt Moore	Comedy	Universal
The Pinto Kid	Louis King	Buzz Barton, Frank Rice	Western	FBO
The Pioneer Scout	Lloyd Ingraham, Alfred L. Werker	Fred Thomson, Nora Lane	Western	Paramount
Plastered in Paris	Benjamin Stoloff	Sammy Cohen, Jack Pennick	Comedy	Fox Film
The Play Girl	Arthur Rosson	Madge Bellamy, Johnny Mack Brown	Comedy	Fox Film
The Port of Missing Girls	Irving Cummings	Barbara Bedford, Hedda Hopper, Malcolm McGregor	Drama	Independent
Powder My Back	Roy Del Ruth	Irene Rich, Audrey Ferris	Comedy	Warner Bros.
Power	Howard Higgin	William Boyd, Jacqueline Logan	Comedy	Pathé Exchange
The Power of Silence	Wallace Worsley	Belle Bennett, Ena Gregory, Anders Randolf	Mystery	Tiffany
The Power of the Press	Frank Capra	Douglas Fairbanks Jr., Jobyna Ralston	Drama	Columbia
Prep and Pep	David Butler	David Rollins, Nancy Drexel	Comedy	Fox Film
The Price of Fear	Leigh Jason	Bill Cody, Duane Thompson	Western	Universal
Prowlers of the Sea	John G. Adolfi	Carmel Myers, Ricardo Cortez	Adventure	Tiffany
Put 'Em Up	Edgar Lewis	Gloria Grey, Tom London	Western	Universal

== Q-R ==
Title	Director	Cast	Genre	Notes
Queen of the Chorus	Charles J. Hunt	Virginia Brown Faire, Rex Lease, Betty Francisco	Drama	Independent
Quick Triggers	Ray Taylor	Fred Humes, Derelys Perdue	Western	Universal
A Race for Life	D. Ross Lederman	Rin Tin Tin, Virginia Brown Faire	Drama	Warner Bros.
The Racket	Lewis Milestone	Thomas Meighan, Marie Prevost	Crime	Paramount
Ramona	Edwin Carewe	Dolores del Río, Warner Baxter	Melodrama	United Artists
Ransom	George B. Seitz	Lois Wilson, Edmund Burns	Drama	Columbia
The Rawhide Kid	Del Andrews	Hoot Gibson, Georgia Hale	Action	Universal
The Red Dance	Raoul Walsh	Dolores del Río, Charles Farrell	Drama	Fox Film
Red Hair	Clarence G. Badger	Clara Bow, Lane Chandler	Comedy	Paramount
Red Hot Speed	Joseph Henabery	Reginald Denny, Alice Day	Comedy	Universal
The Red Mark	James Cruze	Nina Quartero, Gaston Glass, Gustav von Seyffertitz	Drama	Pathé Exchange
Red Lips	Melville W. Brown	Marian Nixon, Charles "Buddy" Rogers	Drama	Universal
Red Riders of Canada	Robert De Lacey	Patsy Ruth Miller, Harry Woods	Adventure	FBO
Red Wine	Raymond Cannon	June Collyer, Conrad Nagel	Comedy	Fox Film
Restless Youth	Christy Cabanne	Marceline Day, Ralph Forbes	Drama	Columbia
Revenge	Edwin Carewe, Joseph Schenck	Dolores del Río, James A. Marcus	Drama	United Artists
Riders of the Dark	Nick Grinde	Tim McCoy, Dorothy Dwan	Western	MGM
Riding for Fame	B. Reeves Eason	Hoot Gibson, Ethlyne Clair, Charles K. French	Western	Universal
The Riding Renegade	Wallace Fox	Bob Steele, Nancy Drexel	Western	FBO
Riley of the Rainbow Division	Bobby Ray	Creighton Hale, Pauline Garon, Joan Standing	Comedy	Independent
Riley the Cop	John Ford	J. Farrell MacDonald, Nancy Drexel	Comedy	Fox Film
Rinty of the Desert	D. Ross Lederman	Rin Tin Tin, Audrey Ferris	Drama	Warner Bros.
The River Pirate	William K. Howard	Victor McLaglen, Lois Moran	Drama	Fox Film
The River Woman	Joseph Henabery	Lionel Barrymore, Jacqueline Logan, Charles Delaney	Drama	Gotham
Road House	Richard Rosson	Maria Alba, Lionel Barrymore	Drama	Fox Film
The Road to Ruin	Norton S. Parker	Helen Foster, Grant Withers	Drama	Independent
Romance of a Rogue	King Baggot	H.B. Warner, Anita Stewart	Drama	Independent
Romance of the Underworld	Irving Cummings	Mary Astor, John Boles	Drama	Fox Film
Rose-Marie	Lucien Hubbard	Joan Crawford, James Murray	Drama	MGM
Rough Ridin' Red	Louis King	Buzz Barton, Frank Rice	Western	FBO
Runaway Girls	Mark Sandrich	Shirley Mason, Hedda Hopper	Drama	Columbia
The Rush Hour	E. Mason Hopper	Marie Prevost, Seena Owen	Comedy	Pathé Exchange

== S ==
Title	Director	Cast	Genre	Notes
Saddle Mates	Richard Thorpe	Hal Taliaferro, Hank Bell	Western	Pathé Exchange
Sadie Thompson	Raoul Walsh	Gloria Swanson, Lionel Barrymore	Drama	United Artists
Sailors' Wives	Joseph Henabery	Mary Astor, Lloyd Hughes	Romance	First National
Sal of Singapore	Howard Higgin	Phyllis Haver, Alan Hale	Drama	Pathé Exchange
Sally of the Scandals	Lynn Shores	Bessie Love, Irene Lambert	Drama	FBO
Sally's Shoulders	Lynn Shores	Lois Wilson, Huntley Gordon	Drama	FBO
San Francisco Nights	Roy William Neill	Percy Marmont, Mae Busch, George E. Stone	Drama	Gotham
Satan and the Woman	Burton L. King	Claire Windsor, Cornelius Keefe, Vera Lewis	Drama	Independent
The Sawdust Paradise	Luther Reed	Esther Ralston, Reed Howes	Drama	Paramount
Say It with Sables	Frank Capra	Francis X. Bushman, Helene Chadwick	Drama	Columbia
The Scarlet Dove	Arthur Gregor	Lowell Sherman, Josephine Borio	Romance	Tiffany
The Scarlet Lady	Alan Crosland	Lya de Putti, Don Alvarado	Drama	Columbia
The Secret Hour	Rowland V. Lee	Pola Negri, Jean Hersholt	Romance	Paramount
Shadows of the Night	D. Ross Lederman	Lawrence Gray, Louise Lorraine	Drama	MGM
The Shady Lady	Edward H. Griffith	Phyllis Haver, Louis Wolheim	Comedy	Pathé Exchange
Sharp Shooters	John G. Blystone	George O'Brien, Lois Moran	Comedy	Fox
The Shepherd of the Hills	Albert S. Rogell	Alec B. Francis, Molly O'Day, John Boles	Drama	First National
The Shield of Honor	Emory Johnson	Neil Hamilton, Dorothy Gulliver	Crime	Universal
A Ship Comes In	William K. Howard	Rudolph Schildkraut, Louise Dresser	Drama	Pathé Exchange
Ships of the Night	Duke Worne	Jacqueline Logan, Sôjin Kamiyama, Jack Mower	Adventure	Rayart
The Shopworn Angel	Richard Wallace	Nancy Carroll, Gary Cooper	Romance	Paramount
Should a Girl Marry?	Scott Pembroke	Helen Foster, Donald Keith	Crime	Rayart
Show Folks	Paul L. Stein	Lina Basquette, Carole Lombard	Drama	Pathé Exchange
Show Girl	Alfred Santell	Alice White, Donald Reed	Comedy	First National
Show People	King Vidor	Marion Davies, William Haines	Comedy	MGM
The Showdown	Victor Schertzinger	George Bancroft, Evelyn Brent	Drama	Paramount
The Sideshow	Erle C. Kenton	Marie Prevost, Ralph Graves	Drama	Columbia
Silent Trail	J.P. McGowan	Bob Custer, Peggy Montgomery	Western	Independent
The Singing Fool	Lloyd Bacon	Al Jolson, Betty Bronson	Melodrama	Warner Bros.
Sinners in Love	George Melford	Olive Borden, Huntley Gordon	Drama	FBO
Sinner's Parade	John G. Adolfi	Victor Varconi, Dorothy Revier	Crime	Columbia
Sins of the Fathers	Ludwig Berger	Emil Jannings, Ruth Chatterton	Drama	Paramount
Sisters of Eve	Scott Pembroke	Anita Stewart, Betty Blythe	Mystery	Rayart
Skinner's Big Idea	Lynn Shores	Bryant Washburn, William Orlamond	Comedy	FBO
Skyscraper	Howard Higgin	William Boyd, Alan Hale	Drama	Pathé Exchange
The Sky Rider	Alan James	Gareth Hughes, Josephine Hill	Drama	Chesterfield
The Smart Set	Jack Conway	William Haines, Jack Holt	Comedy	MGM
So This Is Love?	Frank Capra	Shirley Mason, William Collier Jr.	Comedy	Columbia
Soft Living	James Tinling	Madge Bellamy, Johnny Mack Brown	Comedy	Fox
Someone to Love	F. Richard Jones	Charles "Buddy" Rogers, Mary Brian	Comedy	Paramount
Something Always Happens	Frank Tuttle	Esther Ralston, Neil Hamilton	Comedy	Paramount
Son of the Golden West	Eugene Forde	Tom Mix, Sharon Lynn	Western	FBO
South of Panama	Charles J. Hunt	Carmelita Geraghty, Edward Raquello, Lewis Sargent	Drama	Chesterfield
Speedy	Ted Wilde	Harold Lloyd, Ann Christy	Comedy	Paramount
The Speed Classic	Bruce M. Mitchell	Rex Lease, Mildred Harris	Action	Independent
The Spieler	Tay Garnett	Alan Hale, Clyde Cook, Renée Adorée	Drama	Pathé Exchange
The Sporting Age	Erle C. Kenton	Belle Bennett, Holmes Herbert	Drama	Columbia
Sporting Goods	Malcolm St. Clair	Richard Dix, Ford Sterling	Comedy	Paramount
Square Crooks	Lewis Seiler	Robert Armstrong, Johnny Mack Brown	Comedy	Fox
Stand and Deliver	Donald Crisp	Rod La Rocque, Lupe Vélez	Drama	Pathé Exchange
State Street Sadie	Archie Mayo	Conrad Nagel, Myrna Loy	Crime	Warner Bros.
Steamboat Bill, Jr.	Charles Riesner	Buster Keaton, Marion Byron	Comedy	United Artists
Stocks and Blondes	Dudley Murphy	Gertrude Astor, Jacqueline Logan	Comedy	FBO
Stolen Love	Lynn Shores	Marceline Day, Rex Lease	Drama	FBO
Stool Pigeon	Renaud Hoffman	Olive Borden, Charles Delaney	Crime	Columbia
Stop That Man!	Nat Ross	Arthur Lake, Barbara Kent	Comedy	Universal
Stormy Waters	Edgar Lewis	Eve Southern; Malcolm McGregor, Roy Stewart	Drama	Tiffany
Street Angel	Frank Borzage	Janet Gaynor, Charles Farrell	Melodrama	Fox
The Street of Illusion	Erle C. Kenton	Virginia Valli, Ian Keith	Drama	Columbia
The Street of Sin	Mauritz Stiller, Ludwig Berger, Lothar Mendes	Olga Baclanova, Emil Jannings, Fay Wray	Drama	Paramount
The Stronger Will	Bernard McEveety	Percy Marmont, Rita Carewe	Drama	Independent
Submarine	Frank Capra	Jack Holt, Dorothy Revier	Drama	Columbia
The Sunset Legion	Lloyd Ingraham, Alfred L. Werker	Fred Thomson, Edna Murphy	Western	Paramount
Sweet Sixteen	Scott Pembroke	Helen Foster, Gertrude Olmstead	Drama	Rayart

== T-U ==
Title	Director	Cast	Genre	Notes
Take Me Home	Marshall Neilan	Bebe Daniels, Neil Hamilton	Comedy	Paramount
Taking a Chance	Norman Z. McLeod	Rex Bell, Lola Todd	Western	Fox
Taxi 13	Marshall Neilan	Chester Conklin, Ethel Wales	Comedy	FBO
Telling the World	Sam Wood	William Haines, Anita Page	Comedy	MGM
Tempest	Sam Taylor	John Barrymore, Camilla Horn	Drama	United Artists
Tenderloin	Michael Curtiz	Dolores Costello, Conrad Nagel	Crime	Warner Bros.
Tenth Avenue	William C. deMille	Phyllis Haver, Victor Varconi, Joseph Schildkraut	Drama	Pathé Exchange
The Terror	Roy Del Ruth	May McAvoy, Edward Everett Horton	Mystery	Warner Bros.
Texas Tommy	J.P. McGowan	Bob Custer, Mary Mayberry	Western	Independent
The Texas Tornado	Frank Howard Clark	Tom Tyler, Frankie Darro	Western	FBO
Thanks for the Buggy Ride	William A. Seiter	Laura La Plante, Glenn Tryon	Comedy	Universal
That Certain Thing	Frank Capra	Viola Dana, Ralph Graves	Comedy	Columbia
That's My Daddy	Fred C. Newmeyer	Reginald Denny, Barbara Kent, Lillian Rich	Comedy	Universal
Their Hour	Alfred Raboch	John Harron, Dorothy Sebastian	Comedy	Tiffany
A Thief in the Dark	Albert Ray	George Meeker, Doris Hill	Mystery	Fox
13 Washington Square	Melville W. Brown	Jean Hersholt, Alice Joyce	Romance	Universal
Three-Ring Marriage	Marshall Neilan	Mary Astor, Lloyd Hughes	Drama	First National
Three Sinners	Rowland V. Lee	Pola Negri, Warner Baxter, Olga Baclanova	Drama	Paramount
Three Weekends	Clarence Badger	Clara Bow, Neil Hamilton	Comedy drama	Paramount
Through the Breakers	Joseph Boyle	Margaret Livingston, Holmes Herbert, Natalie Joyce	Drama	Gotham
Thunder Riders	William Wyler	Ted Wells, Charlotte Stevens	Western	Universal
Tillie's Punctured Romance	A. Edward Sutherland	W. C. Fields, Louise Fazenda, Chester Conklin	Comedy	Paramount
Tracked	Jerome Storm	Sam Nelson, Caryl Lincoln	Western	FBO
The Tragedy of Youth	George Archainbaud	Patsy Ruth Miller, Warner Baxter	Drama	Tiffany
Trail Riders	J.P. McGowan	Buddy Roosevelt, Lafe McKee	Western	Rayart
Trail of Courage	Wallace Fox	Bob Steele, Marjorie Bonner	Western	FBO
The Trail of '98	Clarence Brown	Dolores del Río, Ralph Forbes	Melodrama	MGM
Trailin' Back	J.P. McGowan	Buddy Roosevelt, Lafe McKee	Western	Rayart
Terror Mountain	Louis King	Tom Tyler, Frankie Darro	Drama	FBO
The Toilers	Reginald Barker	Douglas Fairbanks Jr., Jobyna Ralston	Drama	Tiffany
Top Sergeant Mulligan	James P. Hogan	Donald Keith, Lila Lee, Gareth Hughes	Comedy	Independent
A Trick of Hearts	B. Reeves Eason	Hoot Gibson, Georgia Hale	Western	Universal
Tropic Madness	Robert G. Vignola	Leatrice Joy, Lena Malena	Drama	FBO
Tropical Nights	Elmer Clifton	Patsy Ruth Miller, Malcolm McGregor	Drama	Tiffany
Turn Back the Hours	Howard Bretherton	Myrna Loy, Walter Pidgeon, Sam Hardy	Drama	Gotham
Two Lovers	Fred Niblo	Vilma Bánky, Ronald Colman	Drama	United Artists
Two Outlaws	Henry MacRae	Jack Perrin, Kathleen Collins	Western	Universal
Tyrant of Red Gulch	Robert De Lacey	Tom Tyler, Frankie Darro	Western	FBO
Under the Black Eagle	W. S. Van Dyke	Ralph Forbes, Marceline Day	Drama	MGM
Under the Tonto Rim	Herman C. Raymaker	Richard Arlen, Mary Brian	Western	Paramount
Undressed	Phil Rosen	David Torrence, Hedda Hopper	Drama	Independent
United States Smith	Joseph Henabery	Eddie Gribbon, Lila Lee, Kenneth Harlan	Drama	Gotham
The Upland Rider	Albert S. Rogell	Ken Maynard, Ena Gregory, Lafe McKee	Western	First National

== V-Z ==
Title	Director	Cast	Genre	Notes
The Valley of Hunted Men	Richard Thorpe	Jay Wilsey, Oscar Apfel	Action	Pathé Exchange
Vamping Venus	Edward F. Cline	Charles Murray, Louise Fazenda, Thelma Todd	Comedy	First National
The Vanishing Pioneer	John Waters	Jack Holt, Sally Blane, William Powell	Western	Paramount
Varsity	Frank Tuttle	Charles "Buddy" Rogers, Mary Brian	Comedy	Paramount
The Viking	Roy William Neill	Pauline Starke, Donald Crisp	Historical	MGM
Virgin Lips	Elmer Clifton	Olive Borden, John Boles	Drama	Columbia
The Wagon Show	Harry Joe Brown	Ken Maynard, Ena Gregory	Western	First National
Walking Back	Rupert Julian	Sue Carol, Ivan Lebedeff	Drama	Pathé Exchange
Wallflowers	James Leo Meehan	Hugh Trevor, Mabel Julienne Scott	Drama	FBO
Warming Up	Fred C. Newmeyer	Richard Dix, Jean Arthur	Sports	Paramount
Waterfront	William A. Seiter	Dorothy Mackaill, Jack Mulhall	Comedy drama	First National
The Water Hole	F. Richard Jones	Jack Holt, Nancy Carroll	Western	Paramount
The Way of the Strong	Frank Capra	Mitchell Lewis, Alice Day	Crime	Columbia
We Americans	Edward Sloman	George Sidney, Patsy Ruth Miller	Drama	Universal
We Faw Down	Leo McCarey	Stan Laurel, Oliver Hardy	Comedy	MGM
The Wedding March	Erich von Stroheim	Erich von Stroheim, Fay Wray	Melodrama	Paramount
West of Zanzibar	Tod Browning	Lon Chaney, Lionel Barrymore	Melodrama	MGM
West of Santa Fe	J.P. McGowan	Bob Custer, Peggy Montgomery	Western	Independent
West Point	Allan Dwan	William Haines, Joan Crawford	Romance	MGM
What a Night!	A. Edward Sutherland	Bebe Daniels, Neil Hamilton, William Austin	Romantic comedy	Paramount
What Price Beauty?	Tom Buckingham	Nita Naldi, Natacha Rambova	Drama	Pathé Exchange
Wheel of Chance	Alfred Santell	Richard Barthelmess, Bodil Rosing	Drama	First National
When the Law Rides	Robert De Lacey	Tom Tyler, Frankie Darro	Western	FBO
While the City Sleeps	Jack Conway	Lon Chaney, Anita Page	Crime drama	MGM
The Whip	Charles Brabin	Dorothy Mackaill, Ralph Forbes, Anna Q. Nilsson	Drama	First National
The Whip Woman	Joseph C. Boyle	Estelle Taylor, Hedda Hopper	Drama	First National
White Shadows in the South Seas	W. S. Van Dyke	Monte Blue, Raquel Torres	Drama, Adventure	MGM
Why Sailors Go Wrong	Henry Lehrman	Sally Phipps, Nick Stuart	Comedy	Fox
Wickedness Preferred	Hobart Henley	Lew Cody, Aileen Pringle, George K. Arthur	Comedy	MGM
The Wife's Relations	Maurice Marshall	Shirley Mason, Ben Turpin	Comedy	Columbia
Wife Savers	Ralph Ceder	Wallace Beery, ZaSu Pitts, Sally Blane	Comedy	Paramount
Win That Girl	David Butler	David Rollins, Sue Carol	Comedy	Fox
Wild Blood	Henry MacRae	Jack Perrin, Ethlyne Clair	Western	Universal
Wild West Romance	R.L. Hough	Rex Bell, Caryl Lincoln	Western	Fox
The Wild West Show	Del Andrews	Hoot Gibson, Dorothy Gulliver	Action	Universal
The Wind	Victor Sjöström	Lillian Gish, Lars Hanson	Drama	MGM
Wizard of the Saddle	Frank Howard Clark	Buzz Barton, Milburn Morante	Western	FBO
The Woman from Moscow	Ludwig Berger	Pola Negri, Norman Kerry, Paul Lukas	Drama	Paramount
A Woman of Affairs	Clarence Brown	Greta Garbo, John Gilbert	Melodrama	MGM
A Woman Against the World	George Archainbaud	Harrison Ford, Georgia Hale	Drama	Tiffany
The Woman Disputed	Henry King, Sam Taylor	Norma Talmadge, Gilbert Roland	Drama	United Artists
A Woman's Way	Edmund Mortimer	Margaret Livingston, Warner Baxter	Romance	Columbia
Woman Wise	Albert Ray	June Collyer, Walter Pidgeon	Comedy drama	Fox
Women They Talk About	Lloyd Bacon	Irene Rich, Audrey Ferris	Comedy	Warner Bros.
Women Who Dare	Burton L. King	Helene Chadwick, Charles Delaney	Drama	Independent
Won in the Clouds	Bruce M. Mitchell	Al Wilson, Helen Foster	Adventure	Universal
The Wreck of the Singapore	Ralph Ince	Estelle Taylor, Jim Mason	Drama	FBO
The Wright Idea	Charles Hines	Johnny Hines, Louise Lorraine	Comedy	First National
Wyoming	W. S. Van Dyke	Tim McCoy, Dorothy Sebastian	Western	MGM
Yellow Contraband	Leo D. Maloney	Eileen Sedgwick, Noble Johnson, Tom London	Thriller	Pathé Exchange
Yellow Lily	Alexander Korda	Billie Dove, Clive Brook	Drama	First National
You Can't Beat the Law	Charles J. Hunt	Lila Lee, Cornelius Keefe	Crime	Rayart
Young Whirlwind	Louis King	Buzz Barton, Edmund Cobb	Western	FBO

== Shorts ==
Title	Director	Cast	Genre	Notes
The Fall of the House of Usher	James Sibley Watson	Herbert Stern	Horror	
Plane Crazy	Ub Iwerks and Walt Disney		Animated Short	First appearance of Mickey Mouse
Steamboat Willie	Ub Iwerks		Animated Short	
The Swell Head	Bryan Foy	Eddie Foy Jr., Bessie Love	Musical	Sound film

== See also ==
- 1928 in American television
- 1928 in the United States
