= The Dude Cowboy =

1926 film

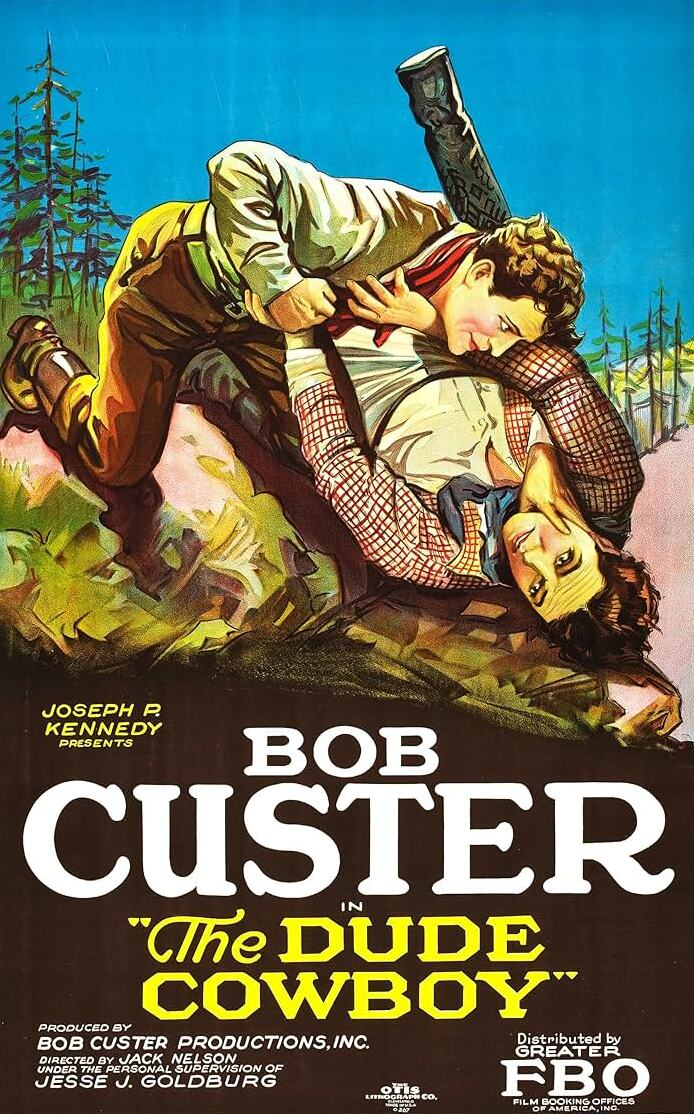
- Theatrical release poster
- Directed by: Jack Nelson
- Screenplay by: Paul M. Bryan
- Story by: James Ormont
- Produced by: Jesse J. Goldburg
- Starring: Bob Custer; Flora Bramley; Billy Bletcher; Howard Truesdale; Bruce Gordon; Amber Norman
- Cinematography: Ernest Miller
- Production company: Film Booking Offices of America
- Distributed by: Film Booking Offices of America
- Release date: October 31, 1926
- Running time: 51 minutes
- Country: United States
- Languages: Silent; English intertitles
- Budget: $100

The Dude Cowboy is a 1926 American silent Western film directed by Jack Nelson and written by Paul M. Bryan. The film stars Bob Custer, Flora Bramley, Billy Bletcher, Howard Truesdale, Bruce Gordon and Amber Norman. The film was released on October 31, 1926, by Film Booking Offices of America.

== Cast ==
- Bob Custer as Bob Ralston
- Flora Bramley as Doris Wrigmint
- Billy Bletcher as Shorty O'Day
- Howard Truesdale as Amos Wrigmint
- Bruce Gordon as Carl Kroth
- Amber Norman as Mable La Rue
- Sabel Johnson as Aver Du Pais
- Edward Gordon as Count Duse
