= The Fighting Hombre =

1927 film

- Directed by: Jack Nelson
- Written by: Evanne Blasdale; Madeline Matzen; Estrella Warde
- Produced by: Bob Custer; Jesse J. Goldburg; Joseph P. Kennedy
- Starring: Bob Custer; Mary O'Day; Bert Sprotte
- Cinematography: Ernest Miller
- Production company: Bob Custer Productions
- Distributed by: Film Booking Offices of America
- Release date: May 1, 1927
- Running time: 54 minutes
- Country: United States
- Languages: Silent; English intertitles

The Fighting Hombre is a 1927 American silent Western film directed by Jack Nelson and starring Bob Custer, Mary O'Day and Bert Sprotte.

== Cast ==
- Bob Custer as Bob Camp
- Mary O'Day as Rose Martin
- Bert Sprotte as Henry Martin
- David Dunbar as 'Goldstud' Hopkins
- Carlo Schipa as Tony Mendoza
- Zita Makar as Marie Mendoza
- Walter Maly as Lone Badger
- Jack Anthony as The Sheriff
