= Perry Murdock =

Actor and Set Decorator

Perry H. Murdock (September 18, 1901 – April 19, 1988), was an American actor, writer and set decorator. He acted in several films, particularly Westerns starring Bob Steele.

== Filmography (as actor) ==
- Captain Careless (1928) as Perry (and co-writer)
- Lightning Speed (1928) as Shorty
- The Amazing Vagabond (1929) as Haywire
- Breezy Bill (1930) as Gabe's Son
- Headin' North (1930) as "Snicker" Kimball
- The Oklahoma Sheriff (1930)
- Western Justice (1934) as Rufe
- Big Calibre (1935) as Deputy (and wrote the story)

== Filmography (as screenwriter) ==
- Tombstone Terror (1935)
