= Cactus Trails =

1927 film

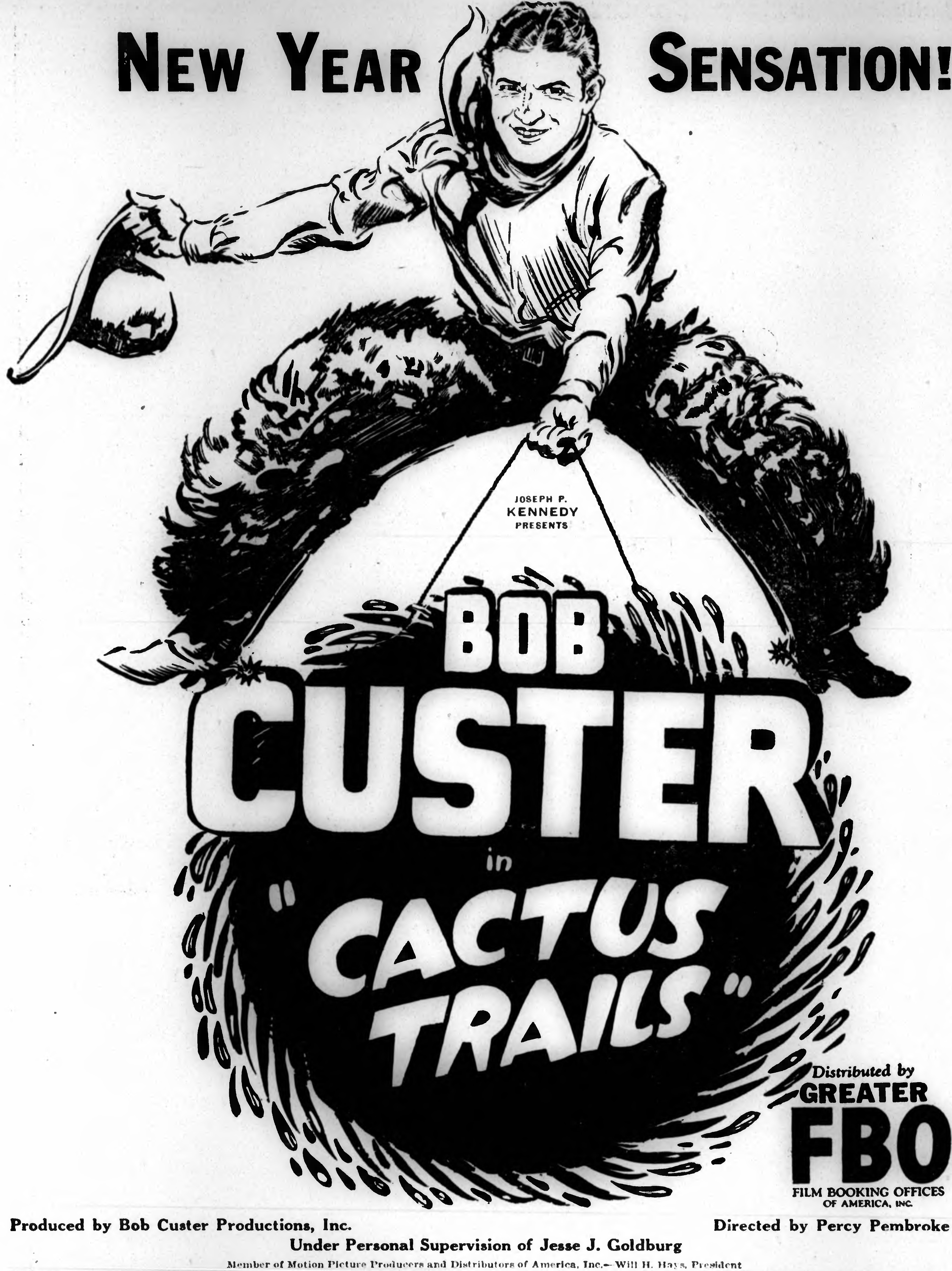
- Directed by: Scott Pembroke
- Written by: "Harry P. Crist" (alias of Harry L. Fraser); George Merrick
- Based on: a story by W. Bert Foster
- Produced by: Joseph P. Kennedy
- Starring: Bob Custer
- Cinematography: Ernest Miller
- Production company: Bob Custer Productions
- Distributed by: Film Booking Offices of America
- Release date: January 23, 1927
- Running time: 5 reels
- Country: United States
- Languages: Silent; English intertitles

Cactus Trails is a lost 1927 American silent Western film directed by Scott Pembroke and starring Bob Custer. It was produced by Custer and Joseph P. Kennedy and distributed through Film Booking Offices of America.

== Cast ==
- Bob Custer as Ross Fenton, a representative of an oil company who travels to Led Horse to check on the town's conditions, only to be made deputy sheriff after an accident.
- Marjorie Zier as Sally Crater, a rancher and the love interest of Fenton. She is the niece of Aunt Crater.
- Lew Meehan as Angel, a gambler who seeks to lease a ranch from Aunt Crater.
- Roy Watson as Sheriff Upshaw, the sheriff of Led Horse.
- Inez Gomez as Aunt Crater, the owner of a ranch which Angels seeks to lease out.
- Roy Laidlaw as Jeb Poultney
- Bud Osborne as "Draw" Egan, the leader of a gang.
- Milburn Morante as Jack Mason
