= Dorothy Vernon (actress) =

American actress (1875–1970)

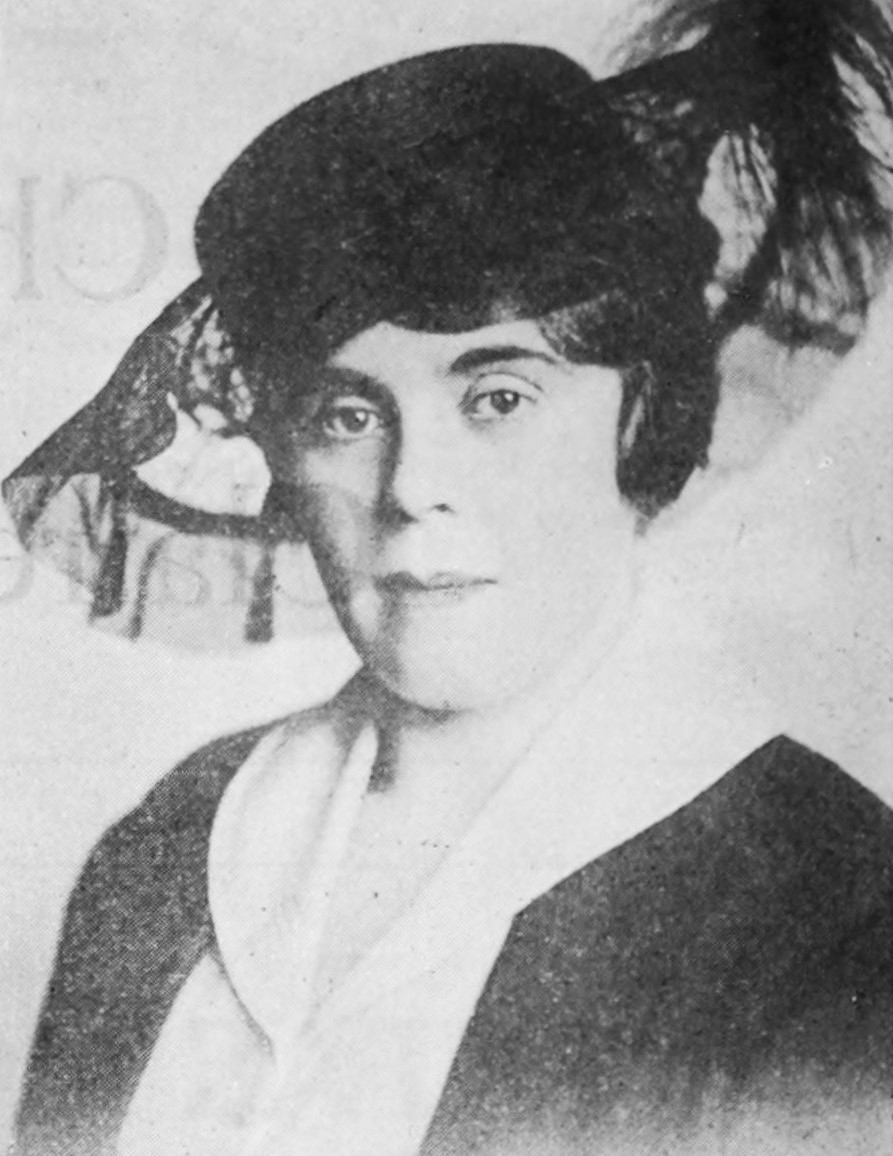
- Vernon in 1919
- Born: Dorothea Christine Arens; November 11, 1875
- Died: October 28, 1970 (aged 94); Granada Hills, California, U.S.
- Occupation: Actress
- Years active: 1919–1956
- Children: Bobby Vernon

Dorothy Vernon (born Dorothea Christine Arens, November 11, 1875 – October 28, 1970) was a German-born American film actress.

Vernon was born Dorothea Christine Arens as the daughter of a Lighthouse warden. When she emigrated to the United States is unknown, but it may have been as late as 1897. She appeared in more than 130 films between 1919 and 1956. She died in Granada Hills, California from heart disease, aged 94. Her son was actor and entertainer Bobby Vernon.

== Selected filmography ==
- Jazz and Jailbirds (1919)
- The Grocery Clerk (1919)
- The Fighting Guide (1922)
- Conductor 1492 (1924)
- Commencement Day (1924)
- Cradle Robbers (1924)
- Dog Days (1925)
- Tricks (1925)
- The Flying Fool (1925)
- Buried Treasure (1926)
- Telling Whoppers (1926)
- Twinkletoes (1926)
- Heebee Jeebees (1927)
- Tenderloin (1928)
- Should a Girl Marry? (1928)
- Manhattan Cowboy (1928)
- Cat, Dog & Co. (1929)
- An Oklahoma Cowboy (1929)
- Riders of the Storm (1929)
- Headin' Westward (1929)
- The Costello Case (1930)
- A Private Scandal (1931)
- Forgotten Women (1931)
- Sister to Judas (1932)
- False Faces (1932)
- Malay Nights (1932)
- East of Fifth Avenue (1933)
- The Laughter of Fools (1933)
- Please (1933)
- Unknown Valley (1933)
- Cleaning Up (1933)
- Alimony Madness (1933)
- Woman Haters (1934)
- Flat No. 3 (1934)
- City of Beautiful Nonsense (1935)
- Father O'Flynn (1935)
- The Speed Reporter (1936)
- Old Mother Riley (1937)
- Melody of My Heart (1937)
- Raw Timber (1937)
- The Bank Dick (1940)
- An Ache in Every Stake (1941)
- Loco Boy Makes Good (1942
- Slightly Dangerous (1943)
- Booby Dupes (1945)
- If A Body Meets A Body (1945)
- The Millerson Case (1947)
- Rusty's Birthday (1949)
- A Place in the Sun (1951)
- The President's Lady (1953)
- Women's Prison (1955)
- Jeanne Eagels (1957)
