= Headin' Westward =

1929 film directed by J.P. McGowan

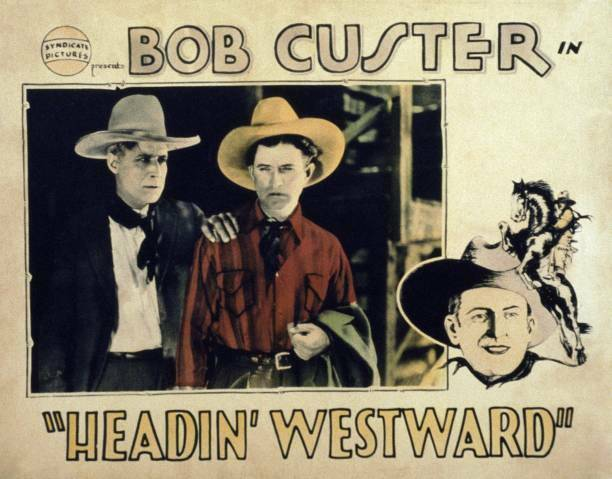
- Directed by: J.P. McGowan
- Written by: Philip Schuyler; Sally Winters
- Starring: Bob Custer; Mary Mayberry; John Lowell
- Cinematography: Paul H. Allen
- Production company: El Dorado Productions
- Distributed by: Syndicate Pictures
- Release date: February 15, 1929
- Running time: 50 minutes
- Country: United States
- Languages: Silent; English intertitles

Headin' Westward is a 1929 American silent Western film directed by J.P. McGowan and starring Bob Custer, Mary Mayberry and John Lowell.

== Cast ==
- Bob Custer as Oklahoma Adams
- Mary Mayberry as Mary Benson
- John Lowell as Ed Benson
- J.P. McGowan as Sneezer Clark
- Slim Whitaker as Buck McGrath
- Mack V. Wright as Slim McGee
- Cliff Lyons as Pat Carle
- Dorothy Vernon as Lizzie
