= Madeline Matzen =

German-American screenwriter

- Born: Madeline Hale Matzen; October 27, 1889; Munich, Germany
- Died: November 29, 1947 (aged 58); Los Angeles, California, USA
- Occupation: Screenwriter

Madeline Matzen (sometimes credited as M. Matzene) was an American screenwriter who worked in Hollywood on silent films of the 1910s and 1920s.

== Biography ==
Matzen was born in Munich, Germany, to Herman Matzen and Emma Hale. Her father was from Germany, and her mother was born in Ohio. Her mother died when she was young, and, she was raised in Ohio by her father and her stepmother. By the 1910s, she had moved to Hollywood to pursue a career as an actress. She and her sister, Dorothy, both ended up finding work at studios as scenarists, according to census records. Madeline wrote a string of films during the late 1910s through the late 1920s.

== Selected filmography ==
As writer:

- Bulldog Pluck (1927)
- The Fighting Hombre (1927)
- Heart o' the Hills (1919)
- In Wrong (1919)
- Burglar by Proxy (1919)
- Bill Apperson's Boy (1919)
