= The Oklahoma Sheriff =

1930 film

- Directed by: J.P. McGowan
- Screenplay by: Sally Winters
- Starring: Bob Steele; Jean Reno; Perry Murdock
- Production company: Big Productions Film Corporation
- Release date: July 10, 1930
- Running time: 49 minutes

The Oklahoma Sheriff is a 1930 American independent Western film directed by J.P. McGowan and starring Bob Steele.

== Plot ==
An Oklahoma sheriff dislikes the man his daughter is set to marry. After a crooked deputy kills the sheriff in a robbery, the sheriff's daughter's boyfriend brings him to justice.

== Cast ==
- Bob Steele
- Jean Reno
- Perry Murdock
- Cliff Lyons
- Mack V. Wright
- Clark Comstock

== Production ==
According to reports from the time, star Bob Steele was taught how to ride and shoot by Native American tribesmen under the guidance of Chief White Bear.

== Censorship ==
Before The Oklahoma Sheriff could be released in Kansas, the Kansas Board of Review required the removal of a scene where the sheriff is hit with an official seal.
