= Buried Treasure (1926 film) =

1926 film

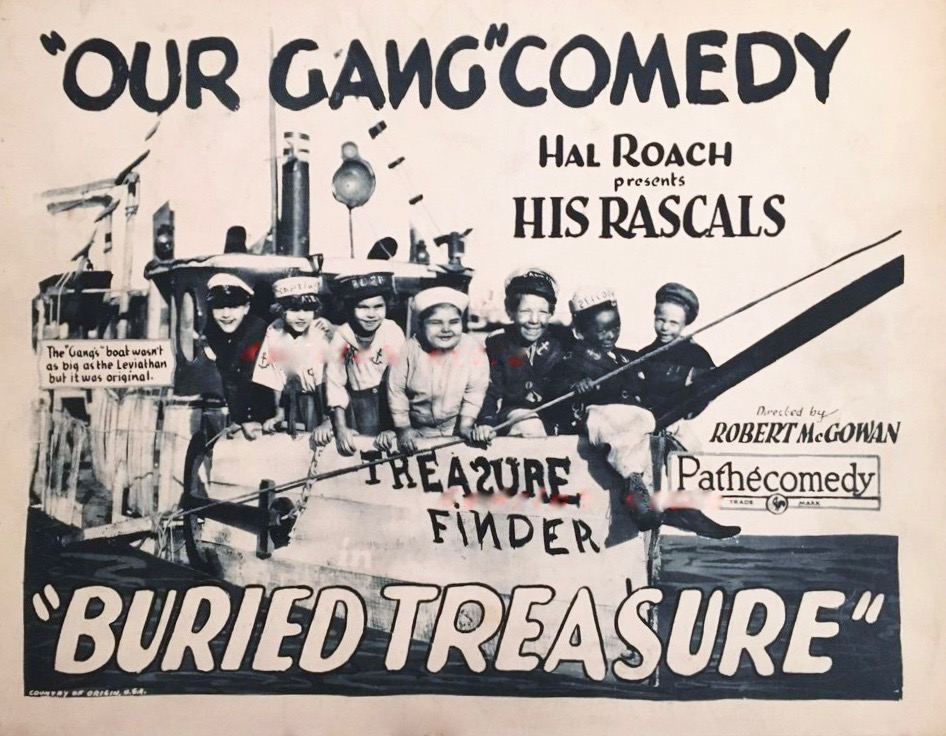
- Lobby card
- Directed by: Robert F. McGowan
- Written by: Hal Roach; H. M. Walker
- Produced by: Hal Roach; F. Richard Jones
- Cinematography: Art Lloyd
- Edited by: Richard C. Currier
- Distributed by: Pathé Exchange
- Release date: February 14, 1926
- Running time: 20 minutes
- Country: United States
- Language: Silent (English intertitles)

Buried Treasure is a 1926 American short silent comedy film, the 47th in the Our Gang series, directed by Robert F. McGowan.

== Cast ==
=== The Gang ===
- Joe Cobb as Joe
- Jackie Condon as Jackie
- Mickey Daniels as Mickey
- Johnny Downs as Johnnie
- Allen Hoskins as Farina
- Mary Kornman as Mary
- Jay R. Smith as Specks

=== Additional cast ===
- Charlie Hall as Man in gorilla suit
- Florence Hoskins as Farina's mother
- Jack Roach as Man in lion suit
- Lyle Tayo as Johnny's mother
- Dorothy Vernon as Gang member mother

== See also ==
- Our Gang filmography
