= Marjorie Zier =

American actress (1909–1952)

Marjorie Zier (February 2, 1909 – March 9, 1952) was an American film actress.

== Film career ==
Zier first became interested in acting as a child after trying on outlandish clothing from her mother's wardrobe. When she was 15, she dropped out of High School to become a full time actress. Her first film was The Ancient Mariner, where she played an extra. Her first major role was in the 1927 film Cactus Trails.

=== Partial filmography ===
Year	Title	Role	Notes
1925	The Ancient Mariner	Extra	
1927	Cactus Trails	Sally Crater	
1928	Phantom of the Range	Vera van Swank	

== Personal life ==
Zier was the third wife of Michael Cudahy, who was a descendant of meat-packing industrialist Michael Cudahy (industrialist). In 1941, Zier divorced Cudahy, citing cruelty.

In 1945, she moved in with real estate agent Stanley Wassil. In 1952, she and Wassil separated, with Zier keeping their apartment. A month later, Wassil beat Zier to death during an argument.
