= Sally Winters =

American screenwriter

- Other names: Mrs. Sally McGowan
- Occupation(s): Screenwriter, actress
- Partner: J.P. McGowan (1926–1931)

Sally Winters (also known as Sally McGowan) was an American screenwriter known for cranking out B movie Westerns in the late 1920s with her then-partner, director J.P. McGowan. She also appeared in a handful of movies as an actress.

== Personal life ==
During the mid-1920s, she dated Worthy Butts, a well-known Hollywood automobile agent; the pair were charged with "staging an orgy" by neighbors who disliked their antics. She later filed a lawsuit against McGowan and Meteor Productions, alleging that McGowan and Winters had lived together for five years beginning in 1926 but that he had not lived up to his promise to marry her. During the suit, she disclosed that McGowan had paid her $60 a week to write scenarios he'd direct, and that he failed to pay her.

== Selected filmography ==
- The Oklahoma Sheriff (1930)
- Near the Rainbow's End (1930)
- The Canyon of Missing Men (1930)
- Western Honor (1930)
- The Hunted Men (1930)
- The Man from Nowhere (1930)
- Call of the Desert (1930)
- Covered Wagon Trails (1930)
- Breezy Bill (1930)
- The Parting of the Trails (1930)
- O'Malley Rides Alone (1930)
- A Texas Cowboy (1929)
- The Man from Nevada (1929)
- 'Neath Western Skies (1929)
- Code of the West (1929)
- Pioneers of the West (1929)
- The Lone Horseman (1929)
- The Oklahoma Kid (1929)
- The Cowboy and the Outlaw (1929)
- The Invaders (1929)
- Riders of the Rio Grande (1929)
- The Phantom Rider (1929)
- Three Live Ghosts (1929)
- The Fighting Terror (1929)
- The Man from Nevada (1929)
- The Law of the Plains (1929)
- The Last Round-up (1929)
- Headin' Westward (1929)
- Texas Tommy (1928)
- Law of the Mounted (1928)
- Manhattan Cowboy (1928)
- On the Divide (1928)
