= Big Calibre =

1935 film

- Lobby card
- Directed by: Robert N. Bradbury
- Screenplay by: Robert N. Bradbury
- Story by: Perry Murdock
- Starring: Bob Steele
- Cinematography: William Hyer
- Edited by: S. Roy Luby
- Production company: Supreme Pictures
- Release date: March 8, 1935
- Running time: 58 minutes
- Country: United States
- Language: English

Big Calibre is a 1935 American Western film produced by Supreme Pictures and directed by Robert N. Bradbury. It premiered on March 8, 1935. The film features Bob Steele as Bob O'Neill, a stockgrower who, seeking vengeance for his murdered father, goes after the murderer, crazed scientist Otto Zenz (Bill Quinn).

== Plot ==
Rancher Bob O'Neill's father is gassed to death by lunatic Otto Zenz. In a bid to avenge his father, Bob tracks the scientist down, and they eventually have a showdown in the dry plains.

== Cast ==
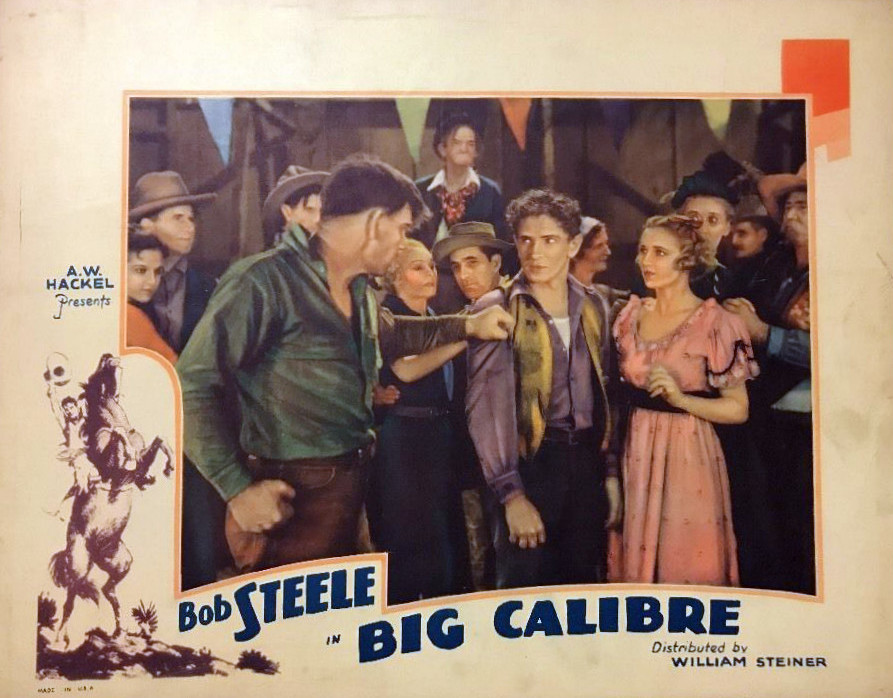
Lobby card

- Bob Steele as Bob O'Neill
- Peggy Campbell as June Bowers
- Forrest Taylor as Banker Bentley
- John Elliott as Rusty Hicks
- Georgia O'Dell as Arabella
- William Quinn as Otto Zenz, aka Gadski (credited as Bill Quinn)
- Earl Dwire as Sheriff of Gladstone
- Frank Ball as Jim Bowers
- Si Jenks as Square Dance Caller (credited as Cy Jenks)
- Chris Allen as Man at Dance (uncredited)
- Silver Tip Baker as Barfly / Man at Dance (uncredited)
- Barney Beasley as Barfly (uncredited)
- Frank Brownlee as Mr. Neal (uncredited)
- Dick Dickinson as Mail Guard (uncredited)
- Fern Emmett as Woman at Dance (uncredited)
- Jack Evans as Man at Dance (uncredited)
- Herman Hack as Deputy Buck (uncredited)
- Otto Hoffman as Man at Dance (uncredited)
- Jack Jones as Cowboy Who Shoots June off Horse (uncredited)
- William McCall as Sheriff #1 (uncredited)
- Frank McCarroll as Jim (uncredited)
- Art Mix as Man at Dance (uncredited)
- Perry Murdock as Deputy (uncredited)
- Fred Parker as Sheriff's Visitor (uncredited)
- James Sheridan as Barfly / Man at Dance (uncredited)
- Arthur Thalasso as Arthur Thalasso
- Blackie Whiteford as Man at Dance (uncredited)

== Reception ==
Film critic Bob Magers considers Big Calibre to be one of Steele's finer films.

== See also ==
- Bob Steele filmography
