= Mary Mayberry =

American actress (1907–1972)

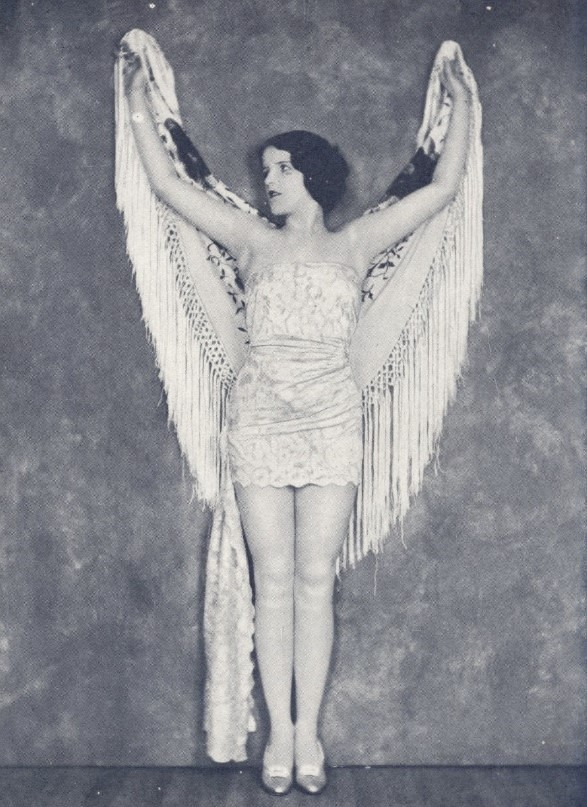
- From a 1927 magazine
- Born: March 29, 1907; New York City, U.S.
- Died: May 4, 1972 (aged 65); El Dorado, California, U.S.
- Occupation: Actress
- Years active: 1920–1930

Mary Mayberry (March 29, 1907 – May 4, 1972) was an American film actress of the silent era. She was also billed as Mary Mabery in five films.

After appearing in a number of shorts, she played the female lead in several westerns alongside Bob Custer and other stars.

== Partial filmography ==
- Law of the Mounted (1928)
- The Law's Lash (1928)
- Captain Careless (1928)
- Manhattan Cowboy (1928)
- Dog Law (1928)
- Lightning Speed (1928)
- Texas Tommy (1928)
- Headin' Westward (1929)
- Midnight Daddies (1930)

== Bibliography ==
- John J. McGowan. J.P. McGowan: Biography of a Hollywood Pioneer. McFarland, 2005.
