= Should a Girl Marry? (1928 film) =

1928 film

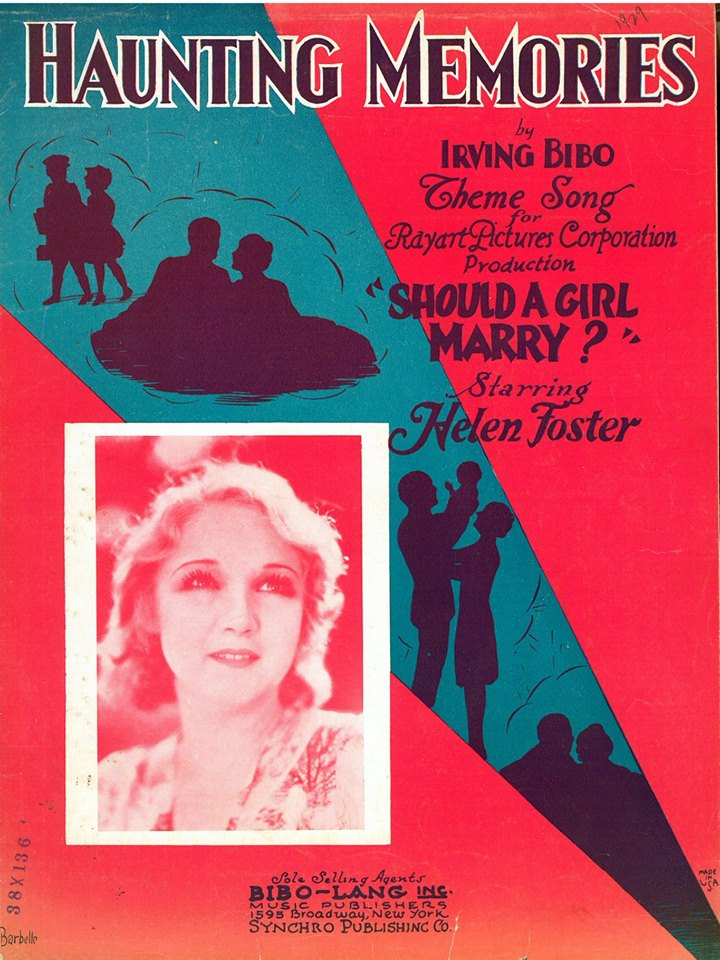
- Directed by: Scott Pembroke
- Written by: Arthur Hoerl; Terry Turner
- Produced by: W. Ray Johnston; Trem Carr
- Starring: Helen Foster; Donald Keith; William V. Mong
- Cinematography: Hap Depew
- Edited by: J.S. Harrington
- Production company: Trem Carr Pictures
- Distributed by: Rayart Pictures
- Release date: October 22, 1928
- Running time: 65 minutes
- Country: United States
- Languages: Sound (Part-Talkie); English intertitles

Should a Girl Marry? is a 1928 American part-talkie crime film. All of the dialogue occurs in the last two reels of the picture, which take place in a courtroom. In addition to sequences with audible dialogue or talking sequences, the film features a synchronized musical score and sound effects along with English intertitles. The sound was recorded using the Filmtone system. The film was directed by Scott Pembroke and starring Helen Foster, Donald Keith, and William V. Mong.

== Plot ==
Alice Dunn (Helen Foster) kills the man who seduced her younger sister and drove her to her death. Charged with murder, she stands trial in a sensational courtroom case that climaxes with her acquittal by the jury.

Trying to rebuild her life, Alice leaves her hometown and starts over in a new city. There, she finds a job at a bank and falls in love with Jerry Blaine (Donald Keith), the kind-hearted stepson of the bank’s president, Andrew Blaine (William V. Mong). Jerry helps Alice regain hope and stability, and soon they become engaged.

But their happiness is threatened by Jarvin (George Chesebro), a detective and friend of the man Alice killed. Obsessed with vengeance and bitter over her acquittal, Jarvin relentlessly tracks her down, sabotaging her efforts to hold jobs and fit into society. Now called in to investigate missing funds at the bank, Jarvin sees an opportunity to ruin Alice once and for all. He demands she "be nice" to him in exchange for his silence—but she flatly refuses.

Jarvin exposes her past to Andrew Blaine at the engagement party, and the banker confronts Alice, falsely accusing her of being the bank thief and offering her hush money to leave town. Alice refuses the bribe and counters with the truth: Blaine himself is the real embezzler.

Jarvin, having followed Blaine to Alice’s home, overhears the exchange. As the two men argue, Blaine shoots the detective and leaps to his death from a window. On his deathbed, Jarvin confesses that Alice was innocent and that Blaine was the actual thief.

Alice finds herself once more in the courtroom, where the judge reflects on the mistake she made in concealing her past from the man she hoped to marry. With the truth finally revealed and her name cleared, Alice and Jerry are reunited, free to marry and begin a new life together.

== Cast ==
- Helen Foster as Alice Dunn
- Donald Keith as Jerry Blaine
- William V. Mong as Andrew Blaine
- Andy Clyde as Harry
- Dot Farley as Mae Reynolds
- George Chesebro as Jarvin
- Dorothy Vernon as Aunt Ada

== Music ==
The film features a theme song entitled "Haunting Memories" with words and music by Irving Bibo.

== Preservation ==
Should a Girl Marry? is currently presumed lost. In February 2021, the film was cited by the National Film Preservation Board on their Lost U.S. Silent Feature Films list. According to Columbia University's Women Film Pioneers Project, the Library of Congress holds a trailer for the film.

== Bibliography ==
- Langman, Larry. American Film Cycles: The Silent Era. Greenwood Publishing, 1998.
