= Lightning Speed =

1928 film

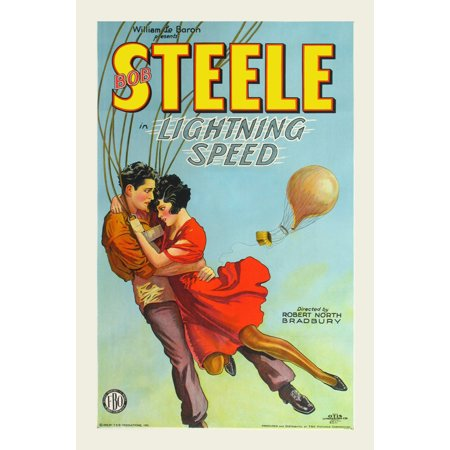
- Directed by: Robert N. Bradbury
- Written by: Randolph Bartlett; Robert N. Bradbury
- Produced by: William LeBaron
- Starring: Bob Steele; Mary Mayberry; Barney Furey
- Cinematography: Robert De Grasse
- Edited by: Della M. King
- Production company: Film Booking Offices of America
- Distributed by: Film Booking Offices of America
- Release date: August 26, 1928
- Running time: 50 minutes
- Country: United States
- Languages: Silent; English intertitles

Lightning Speed is a 1928 American action film directed by Robert N. Bradbury and starring Bob Steele, Mary Mayberry and Barney Furey.

== Plot ==
A journalist in love with the daughter of a state governor tries to prevent her being kidnapped by a notorious criminal, who plans to force her father to pardon his brother.

== Cast ==
- Bob Steele as Jack
- Mary Mayberry as Betty
- Perry Murdock as Shorty
- Barney Furey as Velvet
- William Welsh as Governor

== Bibliography ==
- Munden, Kenneth White. The American Film Institute Catalog of Motion Pictures Produced in the United States, Part 1. University of California Press, 1997.
