= Fangs of the Wild (1928 film) =

1928 film

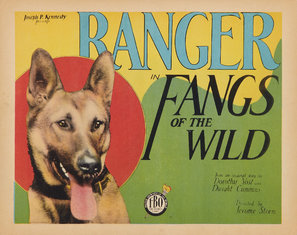
- Directed by: Jerome Storm
- Written by: Randolph Bartlett; Dwight Cummins; Ethel Hill; Dorothy Yost
- Starring: Nancy Drexel; Sam Nelson
- Cinematography: Nicholas Musuraca
- Edited by: Pandro S. Berman
- Production company: Film Booking Offices of America
- Distributed by: Film Booking Offices of America
- Release date: February 5, 1928
- Running time: 45 minutes
- Country: United States
- Languages: Silent; English intertitles

Fangs of the Wild is a 1928 American silent action film directed by Jerome Storm and starring Nancy Drexel and Sam Nelson.

== Synopsis ==
Blossom Williams lives in the hills with her drunkard father. A mountain man, Rufe Anderson, makes unwanted advances towards her. Larry Holbrook, the son of a railroad executive, wants to buy the Williams' land. Larry and Blossom fall in love. On his way to buy the land, Larry is attacked by Rufe and his vicious dog. Larry gives the money to Ranger the Dog, who runs away with it. When Ranger returns, Larry is hanging from the edge of a cliff. Ranger kills Rufe's dog, and then lowers a rope down to Larry. Once Larry is safe, he and Ranger go after Rufe, who is attacking Blossom. Rufe is driven away. Larry and Blossom marry.

== Cast ==
- Ranger the Dog as Ranger, a Dog
- Nancy Drexel as Blossom Williams
- Sam Nelson as Larry Holbrook
- Thomas G. Lingham as Pap Willism
- Syd Crossley as Rufe Anderson

== Reception ==
Laurence Reid, of Motion Picture News, called the film an "average program picture" and criticized the action for being implausible.

== Bibliography ==
- Munden, Kenneth White. The American Film Institute Catalog of Motion Pictures Produced in the United States, Part 1. University of California Press, 1997.
