= Law of Fear =

1928 film

- Directed by: Jerome Storm
- Written by: Ethel Hill; Randolph Bartlett; William Francis Dugan
- Starring: Sam Nelson; Albert J. Smith
- Cinematography: Robert De Grasse
- Edited by: Jack Kitchin
- Production company: Film Booking Offices of America
- Distributed by: Film Booking Offices of America
- Release date: April 8, 1928
- Running time: 47 minutes
- Country: United States
- Languages: Silent; English intertitles

Law of Fear is a 1928 American silent western film directed by Jerome Storm and starring Sam Nelson and Albert J. Smith. Ranger the Dog was given full screen credit.

== Cast ==
- Ranger the Dog as Ranger, a Dog
- Jane Reid as Marion
- Sam Nelson as Bud Hardy
- Albert J. Smith as Steve Benton / The Hunchbacked Masked Bandit
- Ida Lewis

== Bibliography ==
- Munden, Kenneth White. The American Film Institute Catalog of Motion Pictures Produced in the United States, Part 1. University of California Press, 1997.
