= Captain Careless =

1928 film

- Directed by: Jerome Storm
- Screenplay by: Randolph Bartlett; Frank Howard Clark; Perry Murdock
- Story by: Perry Murdock; Bob Steele
- Starring: Bob Steele; Mary Mayberry; Jack Donovan; Barney Furey; Perry Murdock; Wilfrid North
- Cinematography: Virgil Miller
- Edited by: Jack Kitchin
- Production company: Film Booking Offices of America
- Distributed by: Film Booking Offices of America
- Release date: August 26, 1928
- Running time: 60 minutes
- Country: United States
- Language: English

Captain Careless is a 1928 American adventure film directed by Jerome Storm and written by Randolph Bartlett, Frank Howard Clark and Perry Murdock. The film stars Bob Steele, Mary Mayberry, Jack Donovan, Barney Furey, Murdock and Wilfrid North. The film was released on August 26, 1928, by Film Booking Offices of America.

== Cast ==
- Bob Steele as Bob Gordon
- Mary Mayberry as Ruth
- Jack Donovan as Ralph
- Barney Furey as Medicine Man
- Perry Murdock as Perry
- Wilfrid North as John Forsythe
