= Phantom of the Range =

1928 film

- Directed by: James Dugan
- Written by: Frank Howard Clark; Oliver Drake; Randolph Bartlett
- Produced by: Robert N. Bradbury; Joseph P. Kennedy
- Starring: Tom Tyler; Frankie Darro; Duane Thompson
- Cinematography: Nicholas Musuraca
- Edited by: Pandro S. Berman
- Production company: Film Booking Offices of America
- Distributed by: Film Booking Offices of America
- Release date: April 22, 1928
- Running time: 60 minutes
- Country: United States
- Languages: Silent; English intertitles

Phantom of the Range is a 1928 American silent Western film directed by James Dugan and starring Tom Tyler, Frankie Darro and Duane Thompson. In 1931 it was remade as a sound film The Cheyenne Cyclone. Tyler also starred in a later film with a similar title The Phantom of the Range.

== Cast ==
- Tom Tyler as Duke Carlton
- Frankie Darro as Spuds O'Brien
- Duane Thompson as Patsy O'Brien
- Charles McHugh as Tim O'Brien
- James Pierce as 'Flash' Corbin
- Marjorie Zier as Vera Van Swank

== Bibliography ==
- Munden, Kenneth White. The American Film Institute Catalog of Motion Pictures Produced in the United States, Part 1. University of California Press, 1997.
