= Texas Tommy (film) =

1928 film directed by J.P. McGowan

- Directed by: J.P. McGowan
- Written by: Sally Winters
- Produced by: J. Charles Davis
- Starring: Bob Custer; Mary Mayberry; Bud Osborne
- Cinematography: Paul H. Allen
- Edited by: Philip Schuyler
- Production company: El Dorado Productions
- Distributed by: Syndicate Pictures
- Release date: December 1928
- Country: United States
- Languages: Silent; English intertitles

Texas Tommy is a lost 1928 American silent Western film directed by J.P. McGowan and starring Bob Custer, Mary Mayberry and Bud Osborne.

== Cast ==
- Bob Custer as Bob Cooper
- Mary Mayberry as Rancher's Daughter
- Lynn Sanderson as Unknown
- Bud Osborne as Henchman
- Horace B. Carpenter as Rancher
- Frank Ellis as Henchman
- J.P. McGowan as Texas Tommy

== Preservation ==
With no holdings located in archives, Texas Tommy is considered a lost film.

== Bibliography ==
- John J. McGowan. J.P. McGowan: Biography of a Hollywood Pioneer. McFarland, 2005.
