= Jerome Storm =

American film director

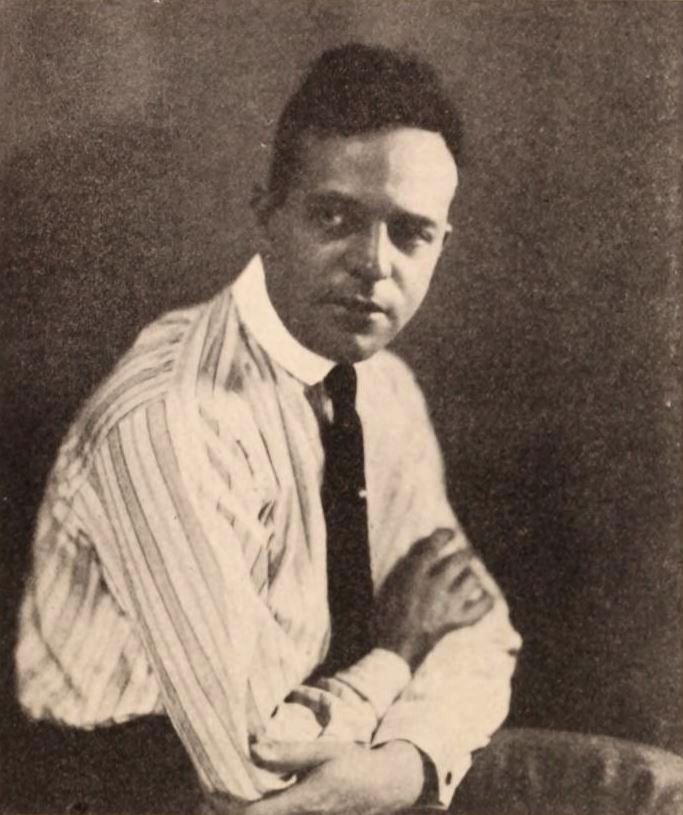
- Storm in 1920
- Born: November 11, 1890; Denver, Colorado, US
- Died: July 10, 1958 (aged 67); Desert Hot Springs, California, US
- Occupation: Film director
- Years active: 1918 – 1932
- Spouse: Mildred Richter (div.)

Jerome Storm (November 11, 1890 – July 10, 1958) was an American film director, actor, and writer. He acted in 48 films between 1914 and 1941 and directed 47 films between 1918 and 1932. He was born in Denver, Colorado, and died in Desert Hot Springs, California.

== Selected filmography ==
- The Primal Lure (1916)
- Somewhere in France (1916)
- The Bride of Hate (1917)
- His Mother's Boy (1917)
- The Iced Bullet (1917)
- Keys of the Righteous (1918)
- The Family Skeleton (1918)
- The Biggest Show on Earth (1918)
- A Desert Wooing (1918)
- The Girl Dodger (1919)
- Greased Lightning (1919)
- The Busher (1919)
- Hay Foot, Straw Foot (1919)
- Bill Henry (1919)
- The Egg Crate Wallop (1919)
- Crooked Straight (1919)
- Red Hot Dollars (1919)
- Alarm Clock Andy (1920)
- Paris Green (1920)
- Homer Comes Home (1920)
- Arabian Love (1922)
- The Rosary (1922)
- Truxton King (1923)
- St. Elmo (1923)
- Madness of Youth (1923)
- Good-By Girls! (1923)
- The Siren of Seville (1924)
- The Goldfish (1924)
- Some Pun'kins (1925)
- Along Came Auntie (1926)
- Sweet Adeline (1926)
- Ladies at Ease (1927)
- The Swift Shadow (1927)
- Dog Law (1928)
- Law of Fear (1928)
- Dog Justice (1928)
- Fangs of the Wild (1928)
- Tracked (1928)
- Captain Careless (1928)
- Courtin' Wildcats (1929)
- The Racing Strain (1932)
- So This Is Africa (1933)
- Rainbow Ranch (1933)
- Diamond Trail (1933)
