= Flora Bramley =

British actress (1909–1993)

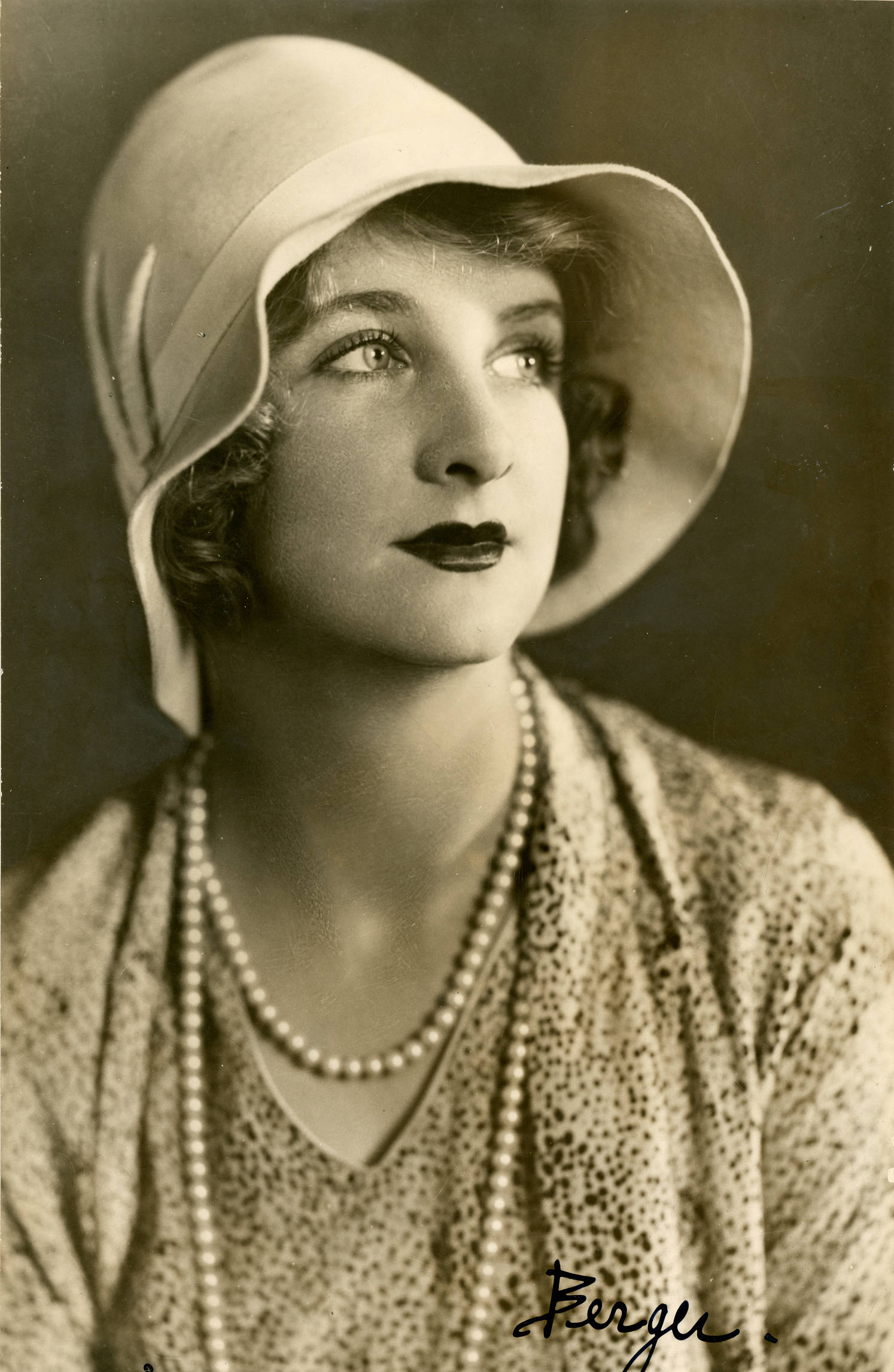
- Bramley pictured in 1929
- Born: 24 September 1904; London
- Died: 23 June 1993 (aged 88); Moline, Illinois

Flora Bramley (24 September 1904 – 23 June 1993) was an American-based British actress and comedian.

== Career ==
Born in London, Bramley started out on stage in musical revues, and in June 1926, while visiting relatives in Hollywood, was signed by United Artists. Her first film (for Film Booking Offices of America), The Dude Cowboy (1926) was followed by three more films, all for United Artists. She was persuaded by Harry Brand, general manager of the Buster Keaton studios, to appear in Buster Keaton's College (1927).

In 1928, she was selected to be a WAMPAS Baby Star (sometimes mis-credited as Flora Bromley), receiving a good amount of publicity. That year, her third film, We Americans (1928) was released. In late 1929, she appeared on stage at the Fulton in Oakland, California, on 1 December 1929, as Laurel in Stella Dallas, directed by future screen actor and director, Irving Pichel. Bramley's short film career ended when she appeared in The Flirting Widow, in 1930.

== Death ==
She died on 23 June 1993, aged 88, at her home in Moline, Illinois.
