= Nancy Drexel =

American actress

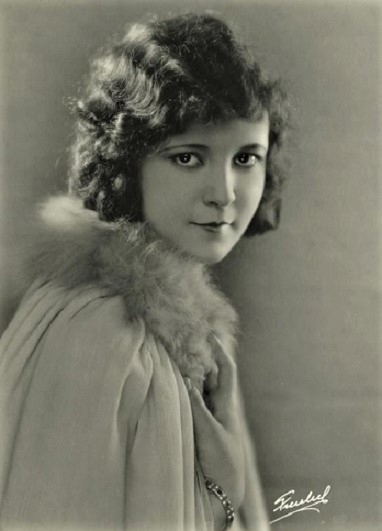
- Born: Dorothy Kitchen; April 6, 1910; New York City, US
- Died: November 19, 1989 (aged 79); Orange County, California
- Occupation: Actress
- Years active: 1926–1932 (film)
- Spouse(s): Thomas H. Ince Jr. (1932–1947); John O. Stornes (1953–1971)

Nancy Drexel (born Dorothy Kitchen, April 6, 1910 – November 19, 1989) was an American film actress of the late silent and early sound era. She was sometimes credited by her birth name in films. She appeared in 29 films, generally B-film Westerns.

Drexel was the daughter of George P. Kitchen, who was described in a newspaper article as "a pioneer of the film industry." Her professional debut came when she was 8 years old, performing in The Royal Vagabond comic opera. She ventured to Hollywood after winning a Miss New York contest that had 10,000 competitors.

In 1931, she appeared in one of the earliest Spanish-language sound films, Hollywood, City of Dreams, as a glamorous movie star who is the idol of the film's hero, José Bohr. Drexel is presented as one of the leading stars of Hollywood, rather than the B-movie leading lady she was in real life.

On September 28, 1932, Drexel married Thomas H. Ince Jr., son of film producer Thomas H. Ince, in Beverly Hills. Both of them were students at Antioch College in Antioch, Illinois, and resumed their studies after the wedding. The couple had two daughters. Drexel sued for divorce in 1947 and married John Stornes in 1953.

== Selected filmography ==
- The Way of All Flesh (1927)
- 4 Devils (1928)
- Prep and Pep (1928)
- The Ridin' Renegade (1928)
- Fangs of the Wild (1928)
- Riley the Cop (1928)
- The Bantam Cowboy (1928)
- (The Shrimp) (1930)
- Hollywood, City of Dreams (1931)
- Speed Madness (1932)
- Partners (1932)
- Law of the West (1932)
- Texas Buddies (1932)
