= Law of the Mounted =

1928 film directed by J.P. McGowan

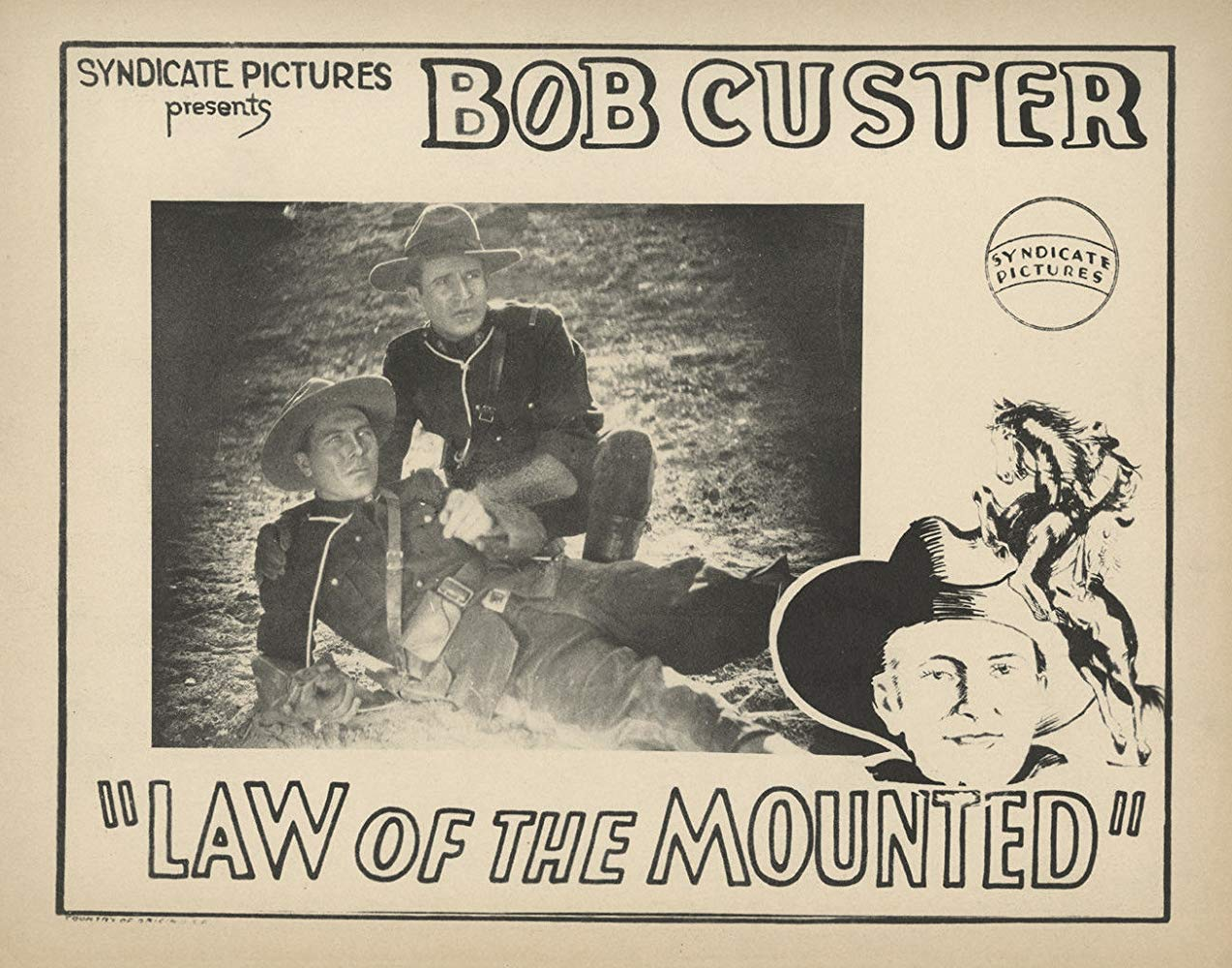
- Directed by: J.P. McGowan
- Written by: Philip Schuyler; Sally Winters
- Starring: Bob Custer; Cliff Lyons; Mary Mayberry
- Cinematography: Paul H. Allen
- Production company: El Dorado Productions
- Distributed by: Syndicate Pictures
- Release date: November 1928
- Country: United States
- Languages: Silent; English intertitles

Law of the Mounted is a 1928 American silent Western film directed by J.P. McGowan and starring Bob Custer, Cliff Lyons and Mary Mayberry.

== Synopsis ==
A Mountie officer on the trail of some fur thieves, discovers they are also tied up in a murder he is investigating.

== Cast ==
- Bob Custer
- Cliff Lyons
- J.P. McGowan
- Mack V. Wright
- Bud Osborne
- Mary Mayberry
- Lynn Sanderson
- Frank Ellis
- Sally Winters

== Bibliography ==
- John J. McGowan. J.P. McGowan: Biography of a Hollywood Pioneer. McFarland, 2005.
