= Manhattan Cowboy =

1928 film directed by J.P. McGowan

- Directed by: J.P. McGowan
- Written by: Philip Schuyler; Ernest Vajda; Sally Winters
- Produced by: J. Charles Davis
- Starring: Bob Custer; Lafe McKee; Mary Mayberry
- Cinematography: Paul H. Allen
- Production company: El Dorado Productions
- Distributed by: Syndicate Pictures
- Release date: October 1928
- Running time: 54 minutes
- Country: United States
- Languages: Silent; English intertitles

Manhattan Cowboy is a 1928 American silent Western film directed by J.P. McGowan and starring Bob Custer, Lafe McKee and Mary Mayberry.

== Cast ==
- Bob Custer as Jack Steel
- Lafe McKee as John Steel
- Mary Mayberry as Alice Duncan
- Slim Whitaker as Slim Sergeant
- John Lowell as Bud Duncan
- Lynn Sanderson as Bert Duncan
- Mack V. Wright as Mack Murdock
- Cliff Lyons as Tex Spaulding
- Dorothy Vernon as Maggie

== Bibliography ==
- John J. McGowan. J.P. McGowan: Biography of a Hollywood Pioneer. McFarland, 2005.
