= The Ridin' Renegade =

1928 film

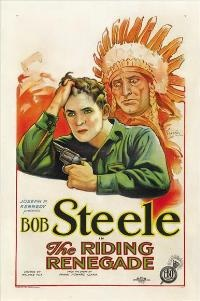
- Theatrical release poster
- Directed by: Wallace Fox
- Screenplay by: Frank Howard Clark
- Story by: Frank Howard Clark
- Starring: Bob Steele; Nancy Drexel; Lafe McKee
- Cinematography: Charles P. Boyle
- Edited by: Della M. King
- Production company: Film Booking Offices of America
- Distributed by: Film Booking Offices of America
- Release date: February 19, 1928
- Running time: 50 minutes
- Country: United States
- Languages: Silent; English intertitles

The Ridin' Renegade (also known as The Riding Renegade) is a 1928 American silent Western film directed by Wallace Fox for Film Booking Offices of America (FBO) and starring Bob Steele, Nancy Drexel and Lafe McKee. The film was distributed by FBO and commercially released in the United States on February 19, 1928.

== Cast ==
- Bob Steele as Bob Taylor
- Nancy Drexel as Janet Reynolds
- Lafe McKee as Sheriff Jim Taylor
- Bob Fleming as Ed Stacey
- Ethan Laidlaw as Pete Hobart

== See also ==
- Bob Steele filmography
