= The Law's Lash =

1928 film

- Directed by: Noel M. Smith
- Written by: Edward J. Meagher; George W. Pyper
- Produced by: Fred McConnell
- Starring: Robert Ellis; Mary Mayberry; LeRoy Mason
- Cinematography: Harry Cooper
- Production company: Fred J. McConnell Productions
- Distributed by: Pathé Exchange
- Release date: May 20, 1928
- Running time: 50 minutes
- Country: United States
- Languages: Silent; English intertitles

The Law's Lash is a 1928 American silent action film directed by Noel M. Smith and starring Robert Ellis, Mary Mayberry and LeRoy Mason. It was designed as a vehicle for Klondike the Dog, an imitator of Rin Tin Tin.

== Cast ==
- Klondike the Dog as Scout
- Robert Ellis as Corporal Ted Campbell
- Mary Mayberry as Margery Neame
- Jack Marsh as Constable Mick Maloney
- Richard Neill as Jean LaRue
- LeRoy Mason as Pete Rogan - Henchman
- William Walters as Chippewa Jim - Henchman
