= Dog Law =

1928 film directed by Jerome Storm

- Directed by: Jerome Storm
- Written by: Frank Howard Clark; Helen Gregg; Stanner E.V. Taylor
- Starring: Jules Cowles; Mary Mayberry
- Cinematography: Robert De Grasse
- Edited by: Della M. King
- Production company: Film Booking Offices of America
- Distributed by: Film Booking Offices of America
- Release date: September 2, 1928
- Running time: 60 minutes
- Country: United States
- Languages: Silent; English intertitles

Dog Law is a 1928 American silent action film directed by Jerome Storm, and starring Jules Cowles and Mary Mayberry.

== Cast ==
- Ranger the Dog as Ranger
- Robert Sweeney as Jim Benson
- Jules Cowles as Hawkins
- Walter Maly as McAllister
- Mary Mayberry as Jean Lawson

== Bibliography ==
- Munden, Kenneth White. The American Film Institute Catalog of Motion Pictures Produced in the United States, Part 1. University of California Press, 1997.
