= Bob Custer =

American actor

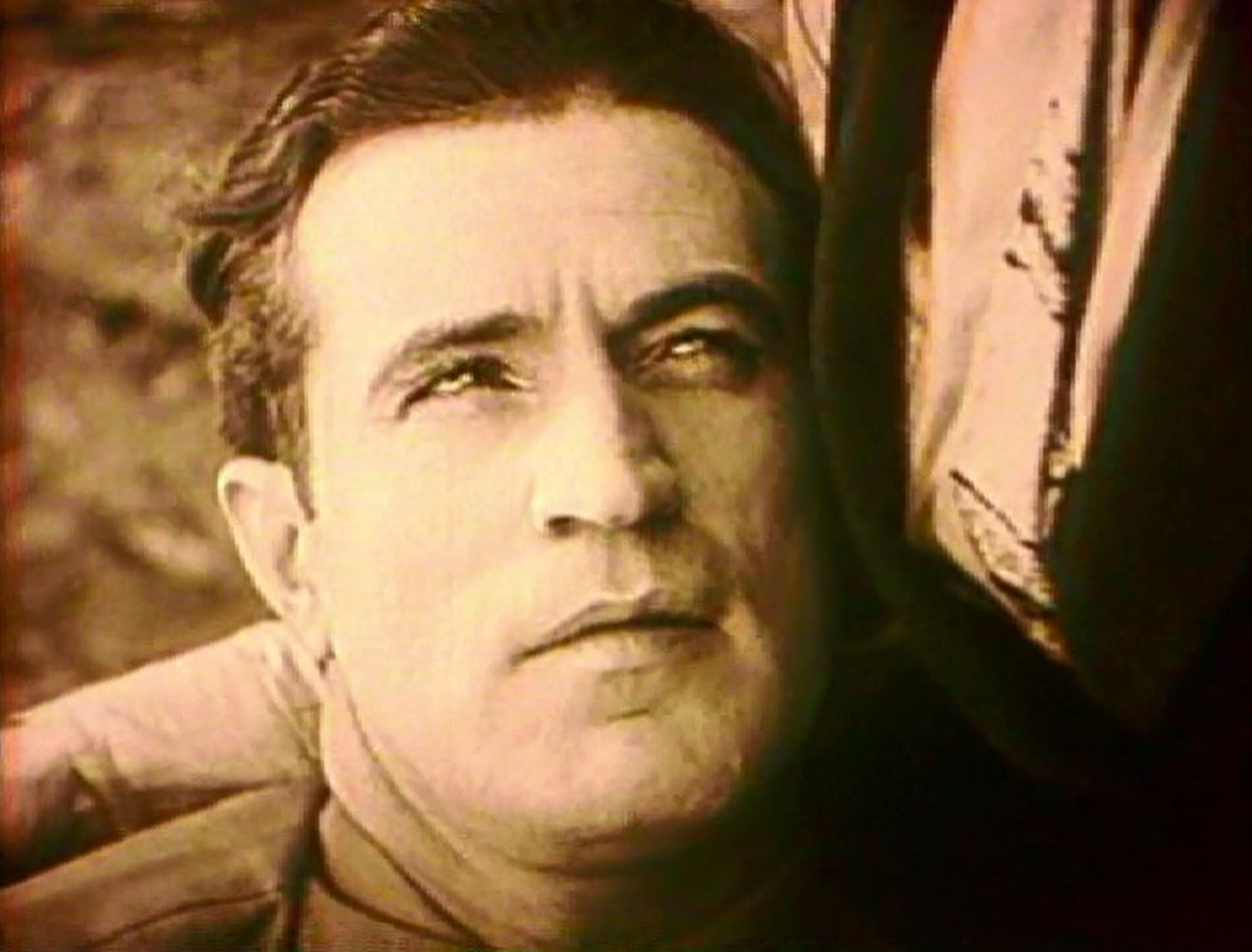
- Custer in Arizona Days (1928)
- Born: Raymond Anthony Glenn; October 18, 1898; Frankfort, Kentucky, U.S.
- Died: December 27, 1974 (aged 76); Torrance, California, U.S.
- Education: University of Kentucky
- Occupations: Actor and producer
- Years active: 1924–1937
- Spouse(s): Anne Elizabeth Cudahy (1926 - 1933, divorce); Mildred Irene Boughers (1948 - 1974, his death)

Bob Custer (born Raymond Anthony Glenn, October 18, 1898 – December 27, 1974) was an American film actor who appeared in over 50 films, mostly Westerns, between 1924 and 1937, including The Fighting Hombre, Arizona Days, The Last Roundup, The Oklahoma Kid (1929; not the Cagney/Bogart version), Law of the Rio Grande, The Law of the Wild and Ambush Valley.

== Early years ==
Custer was born Raymond Glenn in Kentucky's capital city, Frankfort, and graduated from the University of Kentucky with a degree in engineering.

== Career ==
Using his original name Raymond Glenn, Custer appeared in non-Western films, including The Return of Boston Blackie (1927) as the title character. He was billed as Bob Custer for Western films, beginning in 1924 when he worked for Films Booking Office. In 1927, he formed Bob Custer Production, and from 1928 through 1931 he acted in 20 Westerns for Syndicate.

After he left acting, he became a building inspector in Redondo Beach and El Segundo, California. He eventually became chief building inspector in the nearby seaside city of Newport Beach.

== Personal life and death ==
On November 23, 1926, Custer married Anne Elizabeth Cudahy, the daughter of Mr. and Mrs. J. P. Cudahy and a member of the Cudahy Packing Company family. They divorced in 1933. He married Mildred Irene Boughers on May 22, 1948, and they remained wed until his death.

Custer died of a heart attack in Torrance, California, at the age of 76.

== Filmography ==
- Trigger Fingers (1924)
- Flashing Spurs (1924)
- The Range Terror (1925)
- Galloping Vengeance (1925)
- The Texas Bearcat (1925)
- The Bloodhound (1925)
- That Man Jack! (1925)
- A Man of Nerve (1925)
- The Ridin' Streak (1925)
- No Man's Law (1925)
- Man Rustlin' (1926)
- The Fighting Boob (1926)
- The Valley of Bravery (1926)
- The Dead Line (1926)
- The Devil's Gulch (1926)
- Hair-Trigger Baxter (1926)
- The Border Whirlwind (1926)
- Beyond the Rockies (1926)
- The Dude Cowboy (1926)
- Cactus Trails (1927)
- Bulldog Pluck (1927)
- The Fighting Hombre (1927)
- Ladies at Ease (1927)
- The Terror of Bar X (1927)
- Galloping Thunder (1927)
- The Return of Boston Blackie (1927)
- Temptations of a Shop Girl (1927)
- Law of the Mounted (1928)
- Texas Tommy (1928)
- West of Santa Fe (1928)
- Manhattan Cowboy (1928)
- Silent Trail (1928)
- On the Divide (1928)
- Arizona Days (1928)
- Headin' Westward (1929)
- The Last Round-up (1929)
- The Fighting Terror (1929)
- Riders of the Rio Grande (1929)
- The Oklahoma Kid (1929; not the Cagney/Bogart version)
- Code of the West (1929)
- Under Texas Skies (1930)
- O'Malley Rides Alone (1930)
- The Parting of the Trails (1930)
- Covered Wagon Trails (1930)
- Law of the Rio Grande (1931)
- Quick Trigger Lee (1931)
- Riders of the North (1931)
- A Son of the Plains (1931)
- Headin' for Trouble (1931)
- Mark of the Spur (1932)
- The Scarlet Brand (1932)
- The Law of the Wild (1934)
- Ambush Valley (1936)
- Vengeance of Rannah (1936)
- Santa Fe Rides (1937)
