= Adam's Rib (1923 film) =

1923 film

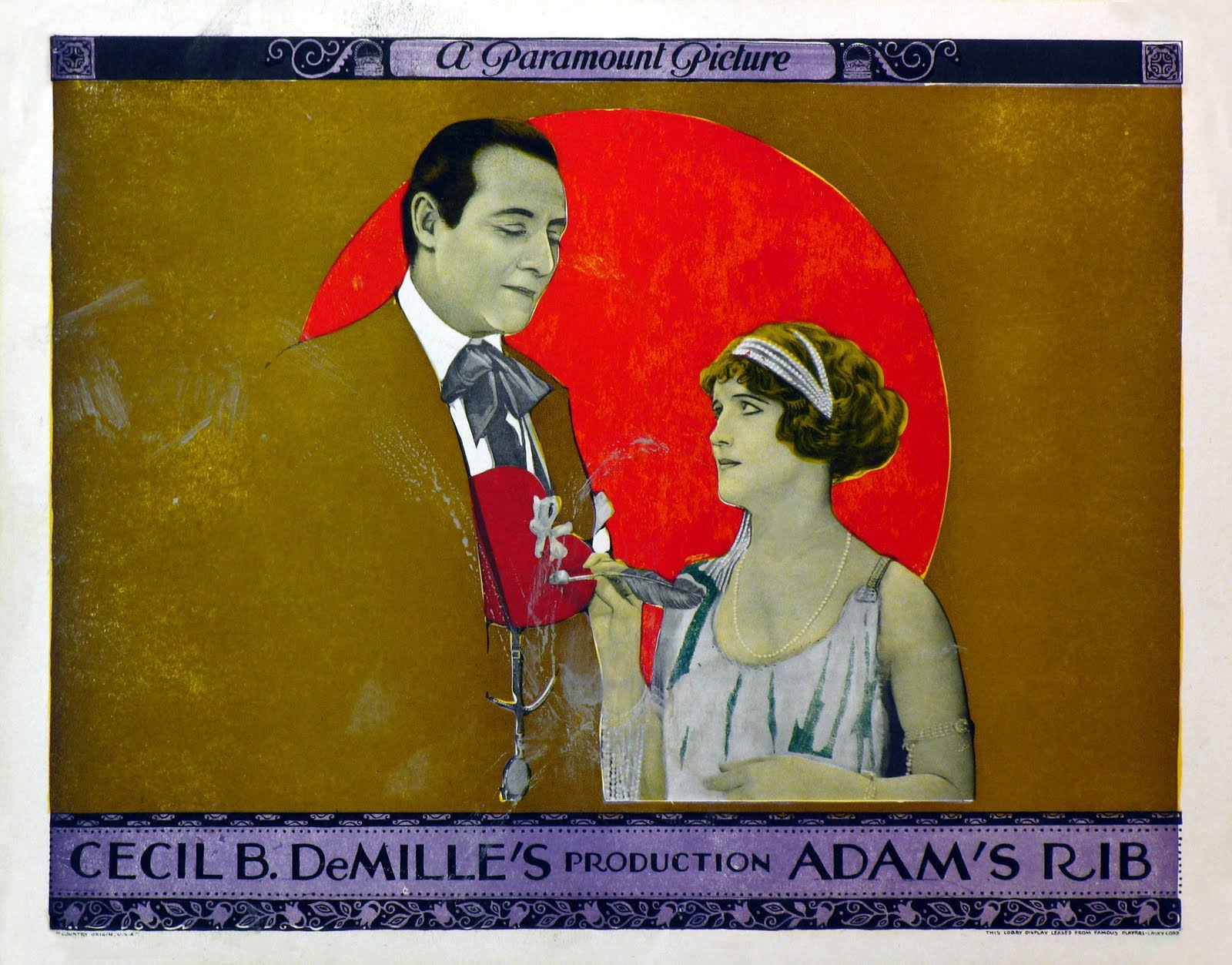
- Lobby card for Adam's Rib (1923)
- Directed by: Cecil B. DeMille
- Written by: Jeanie MacPherson
- Produced by: Jesse L. Lasky
- Starring: Milton Sills; Anna Q. Nilsson
- Cinematography: L. Guy Wilky; Alvin Wyckoff
- Edited by: Anne Bauchens
- Production company: Famous Players–Lasky Corporation
- Distributed by: Paramount Pictures
- Release date: March 4, 1923
- Running time: 10 reels (9,526 feet)
- Country: United States
- Languages: Silent; English intertitles

Adam's Rib is a 1923 American silent drama film directed by Cecil B. DeMille. It was written by Jeanie MacPherson. For the dinosaurs represented in the film, Ray S. Bassler acted as technical advisor. The filmed premiered at New York's Rivoli Theatre on February 25, 1923.

== Plot summary ==
The film centers around the troubled marriage of Michael and Marian Ramsay. Michael is a work-focused commodities trader, and Marian, a socialite yearning for grand romance, becomes infatuated with Jaromir, a deposed king. Their teenage daughter, Tillie, aims to save her parents' marriage while pursuing a relationship with Professor Nathan Reade, a socially awkward paleontologist.

Marian's affair with Jaromir becomes public, prompting Michael to devise a plan to rid himself of his rival by exploiting Jaromir's homeland's economic woes, offering to purchase their wheat surplus if they take Jaromir back as their ruler. Tillie, discovering her mother's affair, decides to distract Jaromir herself to protect her parents' marriage.

In an effort to explain her actions to Professor Reade and dissuade him from believing she's interested in Jaromir, Tillie recounts a fantastical caveman era story featuring the main characters in prehistoric roles, ending with the "caveman" version of the story taking a dark turn. Despite this, Reade proposes to Tillie.

As Marian plans to leave Michael for Jaromir, Michael accelerates his plan using his resources to secure the wheat deal, effectively sending Jaromir back to his kingdom. The misunderstanding about Tillie's intentions causes tension, but eventually, the family resolves their issues, with Michael and Marian rekindling their love.

The plot encompasses themes of marital discord, the lengths to which individuals will go to protect or salvage relationships, and the comedic absurdity of mixing modern sensibilities with prehistoric dramatizations.

== Cast ==
- Milton Sills as Michael Ramsay
- Elliott Dexter as Prof. Nathan Reade
- Theodore Kosloff as Monsieur Joromir, King of Moravia
- Anna Q. Nilsson as Mrs. Michael Ramsay
- Pauline Garon as Mathilda Ramsay
- Julia Faye as The Mischievous One
- Clarence Geldart as James Kilkenna
- Robert Brower as Hugo Kermaier
- Forrest Robinson as Kramer
- Gino Corrado as Lt. Braschek
- Wedgwood Nowell as Minister's Secretary
- Clarence Burton as Cave Man
- George Field as Minister to Moravia
- William Boyd (uncredited)

== Production ==
The prehistoric flashback sequence was filmed in a Two-color Technicolor. Another segment was set in an exhibit hall featuring a real dinosaur skeleton.

== Release ==
Cinema scholar Gaylyn Studlar positioned the release of Adam's Rib as part of studio-led effort to bring "high art to film" and capture a wider audience of middle-class women. Advertisements for Adam's Rib displayed the director's name in large lettering above the film title, and included an image of DeMille posing with a script, alongside a declaration "Cecil B. DeMille Director of Directors! - whose screen record literally glitters with successes... who places his art before anything else."

== Reception ==
The film was a financial disappointment. Adam's Rib earned back its budget, but factoring the costs of marketing, the studio broke even. Commentators have blamed the film's poor performance on the public's waning taste for lavish bedroom comedies and an unfortunate release timing on the same day as Buster Keaton's Three Ages, which also featured a "zany caveman" character.

== Preservation ==
A complete print of Adam's Rib is held by the George Eastman Museum in Rochester, New York.

== See also ==
- List of films featuring dinosaurs
