= The Painted Flapper =

1924 film by John Gorman

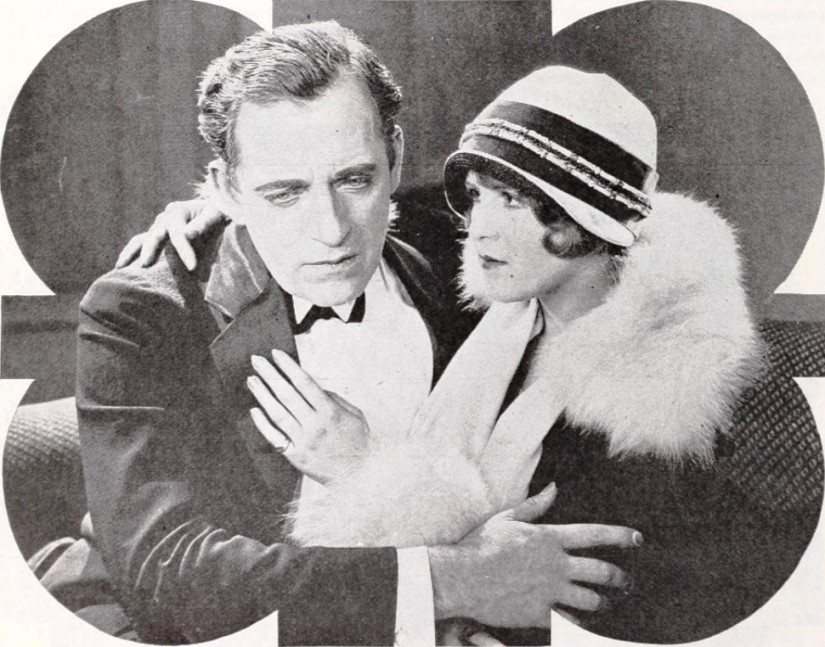
- Cropped still with Kirkwood and Garon
- Directed by: John Gorman
- Written by: Alan Pearl
- Produced by: I. E. Chadwick
- Starring: James Kirkwood Sr. Pauline Garon; Crauford Kent
- Cinematography: André Barlatier
- Production company: Chadwick Pictures
- Distributed by: Chadwick Pictures
- Release date: October 15, 1924
- Running time: 6 reels
- Country: United States
- Language: Silent (English intertitles)

The Painted Flapper is a 1924 American silent romantic drama film directed by John Gorman and starring James Kirkwood Sr., Pauline Garon, and Crauford Kent.

== Cast ==
- James Kirkwood Sr. as Richard Whitney
- Pauline Garon as Arline Whitney
- Crauford Kent as Egbert Von Alyn
- Kathlyn Williams as Isabel Whitney
- Claire Adams as Eunice Whitney
- Hallam Cooley as Danny Lawrence
- John Harron as Jimmy Arnold
- Bud Geary as Lester Howe
- Anita Simons as Lucy May
- Alan Roscoe as Lord Raynesford
- Carlton Griffin as Lord Coventry
- Pauline French as Leita Stokes
- Grace Darmond

== Preservation ==
With no prints of The Painted Flapper located in any film archives, it is a lost film.

== Bibliography ==
- Goble, Alan. The Complete Index to Literary Sources in Film. Walter de Gruyter, 1999.
