= The Heart of Broadway =

1928 film by Duke Worne

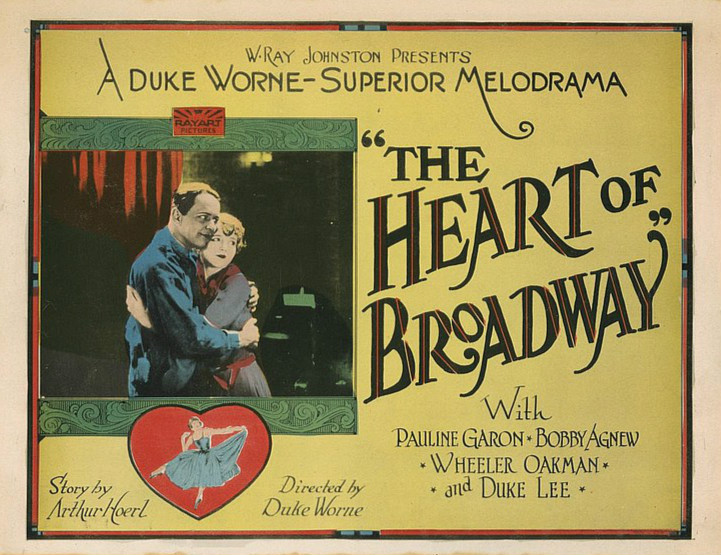
- Lobby card
- Directed by: Duke Worne
- Written by: Arthur Hoerl
- Produced by: Duke Worne
- Starring: Pauline Garon
- Cinematography: Walter L. Griffin
- Edited by: Malcolm Sweeney
- Production company: Duke Worne Productions
- Distributed by: Rayart Pictures Corp.
- Release date: January 1928
- Running time: 6 reels; 60 minutes
- Country: United States
- Language: Silent (English intertitles)

The Heart of Broadway is a 1928 American silent melodrama film directed by Duke Worne and starring Pauline Garon. It was produced by Worne and distributed by Rayart Pictures.

== Cast ==
- Pauline Garon as Roberta Clemmons
- Robert Agnew as Billy Winters (credited as Bobby Agnew)
- Wheeler Oakman as 'Dandy Jim' Doyle
- Oscar Apfel as Dave Richards
- Duke R. Lee as Duke Lee

== Survival ==
The film is preserved at Bois d'Arcy in France and the Library of Congress.
