= Sonny (1922 film) =

1922 film by Henry King

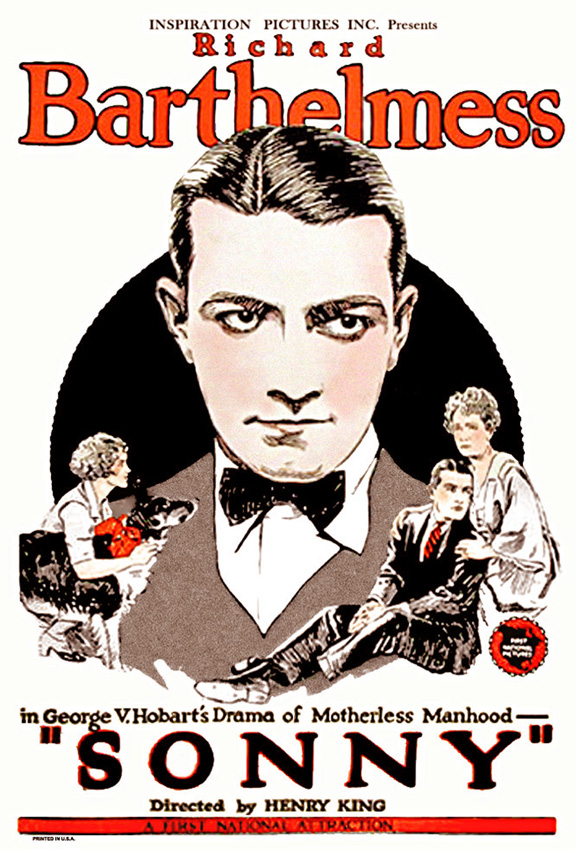
- Directed by: Henry King
- Written by: Frances Marion
- Based on: Sonny (play) by George V. Hobart and Raymond Hubbell
- Produced by: Henry King
- Starring: Richard Barthelmess; Margaret Seddon; Pauline Garon
- Cinematography: Henry Cronjager
- Edited by: Duncan Mansfield
- Production company: Inspiration Pictures
- Distributed by: First National Pictures
- Release date: May 22, 1922
- Running time: 70 minutes
- Country: United States
- Language: Silent (English intertitles)
- Budget: $125,000

Sonny is a 1922 American silent drama film directed by Henry King and starring Richard Barthelmess, Margaret Seddon, and Pauline Garon.

== Cast ==
- Richard Barthelmess as Sonny Crosby / Joe
- Margaret Seddon as Mrs. Crosby
- Pauline Garon as Florence Crosby
- Lucy Fox as Madge Craig
- Herbert Grimwood as Harper Craig
- Patterson Dial as Alicia
- Fred Nicholls as Summers
- James Tarbell as James
- Margaret Elizabeth Falconer as Crosby Twin
- Virginia Magee as Crosby Twin

== Bibliography ==
- Monaco, James. The Encyclopedia of Film. Perigee Books, 1991.
