= Satan in Sables =

1925 film

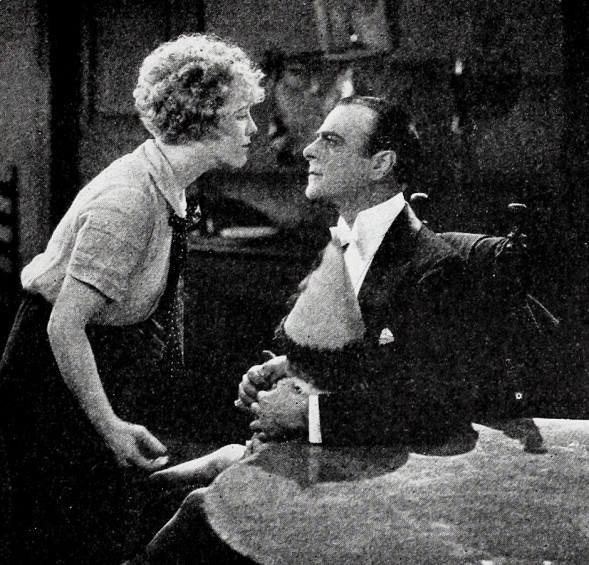
- Film still
- Directed by: James Flood; Gordon Hollingshead (ass't director)
- Written by: Bradley King
- Produced by: Warner Brothers
- Starring: Lowell Sherman; Pauline Garon
- Cinematography: John J. Mescall
- Distributed by: Warner Bros.
- Release date: November 14, 1925
- Running time: 1 hour, 20 minutes
- Country: United States
- Language: Silent (English intertitles)

Satan in Sables is a 1925 American silent drama film directed by James Flood and starring Lowell Sherman and Pauline Garon. It was produced and released by Warner Bros. Pictures.

== Cast ==
- Lowell Sherman as Michael Lyev Yervedoff
- John Harron as Paul Yervedoff
- Pauline Garon as Colette Breton
- Gertrude Astor as Dolores Sierra
- Frank Butler as Victor
- Francis McDonald as Emile
- Frances Raymond as Sophia
- Otto Hoffman as Sergius
- Richard Botsford as Billee
- Richard Barry as Student
- Don Alvarado as Student
- Mary Louise Miller as Baby (uncredited)

== Preservation status ==
A print of Satan in Sables survives in the Museum of Modern Art, New York City.
