= You Can't Fool Your Wife (1923 film) =

1923 film

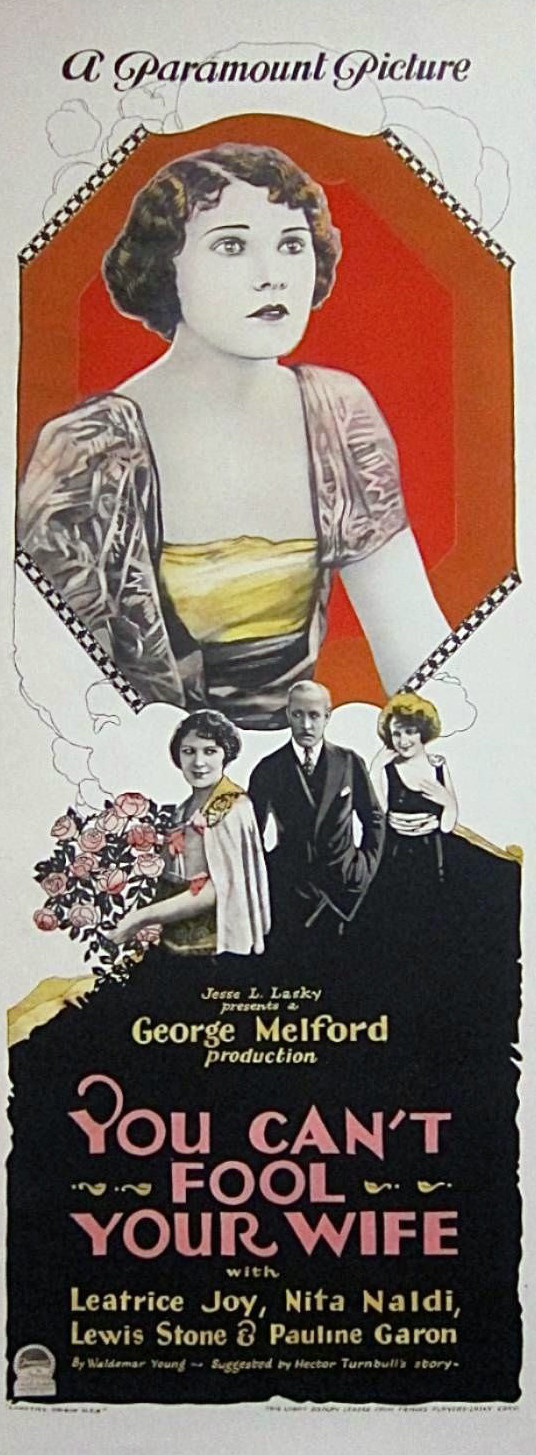
- Theatrical poster
- Directed by: George Melford
- Screenplay by: Waldemar Young
- Produced by: Jesse L. Lasky
- Starring: Leatrice Joy; Nita Naldi; Lewis Stone; Pauline Garon; Paul McAllister; John Daly Murphy
- Cinematography: Bert Glennon
- Production company: Famous Players–Lasky Corporation
- Distributed by: Paramount Pictures
- Release date: April 29, 1923
- Running time: 60 minutes
- Country: United States
- Language: Silent (English intertitles)

You Can't Fool Your Wife is a lost 1923 American silent drama film directed by George Melford and written by Waldemar Young. The film stars Leatrice Joy, Nita Naldi, Lewis Stone, Pauline Garon, Paul McAllister and John Daly Murphy. The film was released on April 29, 1923, by Paramount Pictures.

== Cast ==
- Leatrice Joy as Edith McBride
- Nita Naldi as Ardrita Saneck
- Lewis Stone as Garth McBride
- Pauline Garon as Vera Redell
- Paul McAllister as Dr. Konrad Saneck
- John Daly Murphy as Jackson Redell
- Julia Swayne Gordon as Lillian Redell
- Thomas Carrigan as Russell Fenton
- Daniel Pennell as John Yates

== Production ==
You Can't Fool Your Wife was filmed on location in Florida and Nassau.

== Censorship ==
Before You Can't Fool Your Wife could be exhibited in Kansas, the Kansas Board of Review required the elimination of several scenes and intertitles. The intertitles removed said "Here's to prohibition, may we never meet" and "What is there to prevent me from putting this man to sleep, etc." The scenes removed were of Ardrita smoking, a black child drinking out of used glasses, and McBride being punched.
