= She's a Sheik =

1927 film directed by Clarence Badger

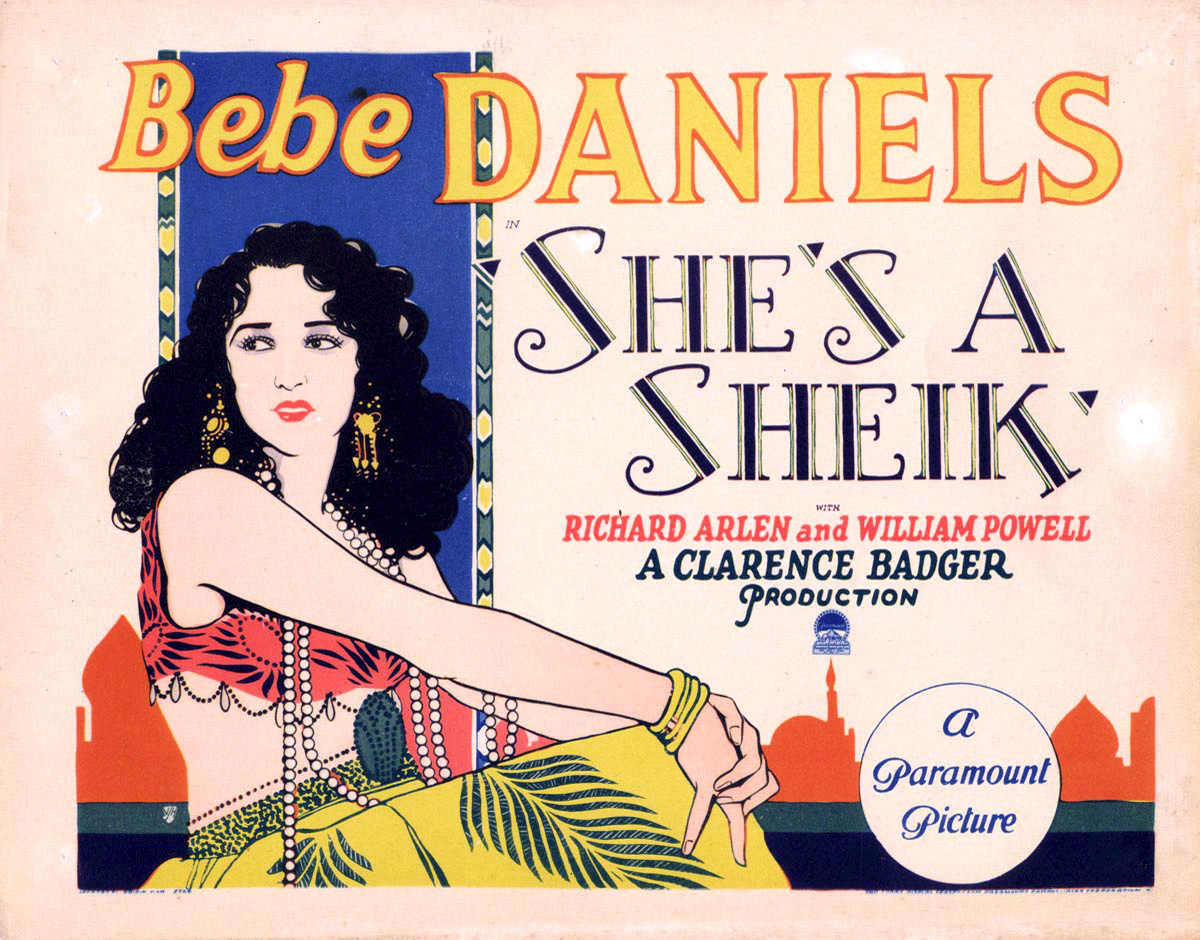
- Lobby card
- Directed by: Clarence Badger
- Written by: John McDermott (story); Lloyd Corrigan (scenario); Grover Jones (scenario); George Marion, Jr. (intertitles)
- Produced by: Adolph Zukor; Jesse Lasky
- Starring: Bebe Daniels
- Cinematography: J. Roy Hunt
- Distributed by: Paramount Pictures
- Release date: November 12, 1927
- Running time: 6 reels, (between 5,931 ft. & 6,015 ft.)
- Country: United States
- Language: Silent (English intertitles)

She's a Sheik is a 1927 American silent comedy adventure film produced and distributed by Paramount Pictures and starring Bebe Daniels. A 16mm print of the film was rediscovered in 2017 by Kevin Brownlow.

== Synopsis ==
External image
- Bebe Daniels possibly in a costume for She's a Sheik

A send-up comedy that uses many of the elements of the Rudolph Valentino 'sheik' films, with the exception that a woman, played by Bebe Daniels, is the protagonist.

== Cast ==
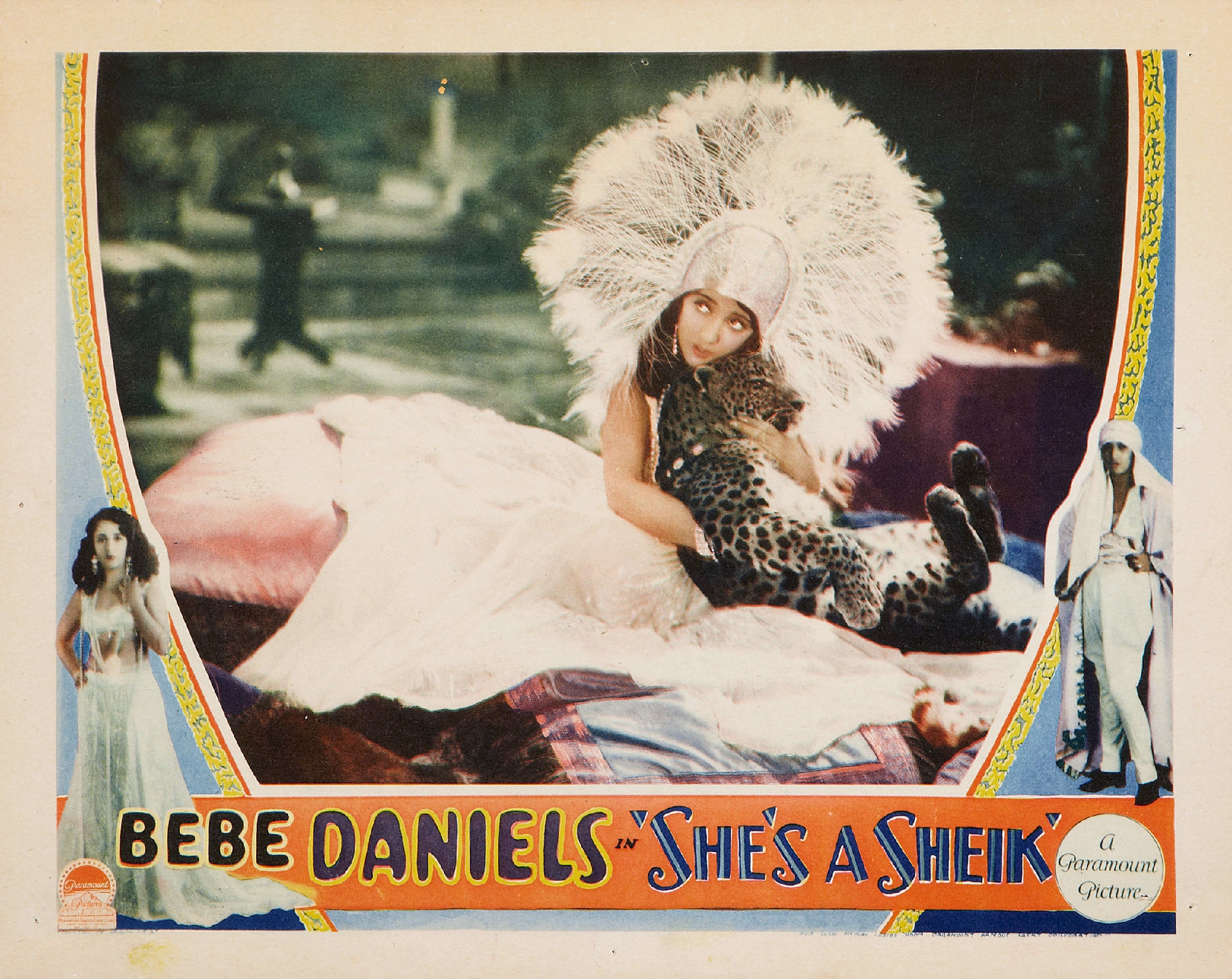
Lobby card

- Bebe Daniels Lyon as Zaida
- Richard Arlen as Captain Colton
- William Powell as Kada
- Josephine Dunn as Wanda Fowler
- James Bradbury Jr. as Jerry
- Billy Franey as Joe
- Paul McAllister as Sheik Yusiff ben Hamad
- Al Fremont as The Major
- Michael Raffetto as Achmet
