= Hop to It! =

1925 film

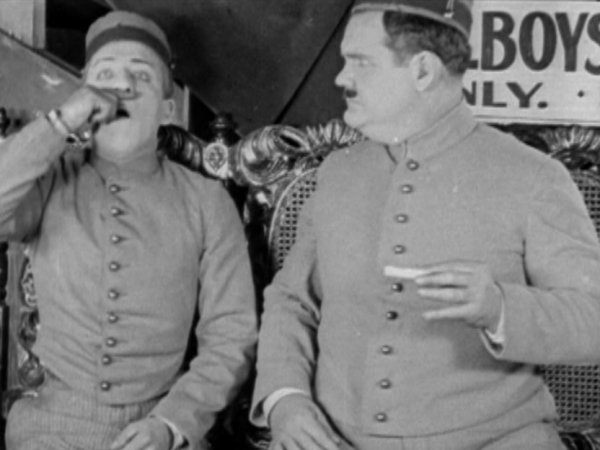
- Bobby Ray and Oliver Hardy in the film
- Directed by: Ted Burnsten
- Written by: Ted Burnsten
- Produced by: Billy West
- Starring: Bobby Ray; Oliver Hardy
- Release date: July 1, 1925
- Running time: 23 minutes
- Country: United States
- Languages: Silent; English intertitles

Hop to It!, also released as Hop to It, Bellhop, is a 1925 American silent comedy film featuring Oliver Hardy.

== Cast ==
- Bobby Ray as A bellhop
- Oliver Hardy as A bellhop (as Babe Hardy)
- Janet Dawn as Saleswoman
- Frank Alexander as Hotel guest

== See also ==
- List of American films of 1925
- Oliver Hardy filmography
