= The Strange Mrs. Crane =

1948 film directed by Sam Newfield

- Directed by: Sam Newfield (as Sherman Scott)
- Screenplay by: Al Martin
- Starring: Marjorie Lord; Robert Shayne; Pierre Watkin
- Cinematography: Jack Greenhalgh
- Edited by: Martin G. Cohn
- Production company: John Sutherland Productions
- Distributed by: Eagle-Lion Films
- Release date: 1 December 1948 (USA)
- Running time: 62 minutes
- Country: United States
- Language: English

The Strange Mrs. Crane is a 1948 American film noir directed by Sam Newfield (credited as Sherman Scott) and written by Al Martin for Eagle-Lion Films and starring Marjorie Lord, Robert Shayne and Pierre Watkin.

== Plot ==
A gubernatorial candidate's wife's ex-partner's fiancée is wrongly tried for murder. It turns out that the real culprit is the lady jury foreman who makes a fatal error.

== Cast ==
- Gina Crane (Marjorie Lord)
- Floyd Durant (Robert Shayne)
- Clinton Crane (Pierre Watkin)
- Mark Emery (James Seay)
- Barbara Arnold (Ruth Brady, 1920–1997)
- Edna Emmerson (Claire Whitney)
- Jeanette Woods (Dorothy Granger)

== Production ==
Filming on The Strange Mrs. Crane began on June 11, 1948, at the Morey-Sutherland Studios. The script was adapted from 'Beyond a Reasonable Doubt', an episode of The Whistler, a radio program, and the episode aired on July 16, 1947.
