= Al Martin (screenwriter) =

American screenwriter

- Born: Albert Harry Martin; January 1, 1897; Milwaukee, Wisconsin, USA
- Died: October 10, 1971 (aged 74); Studio City, California, USA
- Occupation: Screenwriter

Al Martin (January 1, 1897 – October 10, 1971) was an American screenwriter and TV writer known for his work on B-movies across a wide range of genres.

== Biography ==
Martin, a native of Milwaukee, Wisconsin, got his start writing scenarios and titles for silent films, first at Mascot and then at Republic.

In the 1940s, he started working for Hal Roach, Monogram, Columbia, and Paramount. By the 1950s, he was working on various television shows, in addition to writing sci-fi films for Roger Corman. His final feature was 1958's In the Money, a Bowery Boys film.

He had a son, Harvey Martin, with his first wife, Mildred Seib. After Mildred's death, he married Helen Abrams, who he co-wrote Invisible Ghost with.

He once held a party for his dog at the Knickerbocker Hotel, and invited notable A-listers like Joan Crawford and their dogs.

== Selected TV credits ==
- Tarzan (TV series) (1967)
- My Favorite Martian (TV series) (1964–1965)
- My Living Doll (TV series) (1964)
- Laramie (TV series) (1960)
- Troubleshooters (TV series) (1959–1960)
- 77 Sunset Strip (TV series) (1959)
- The Restless Gun (TV series) (1958)
- Cavalcade of America (TV show) (1957)
- The Roy Rogers Show (TV series) (1956–1957)
- Damon Runyon Theater (TV series) (1955)
- Ford Theatre (TV series) (1955)
- Mayor of the Town (TV series) (1954)
- Ramar of the Jungle (TV series) (1954)
- The Stu Erwin Show (TV series) (1951–1953)

== Selected filmography ==
- In the Money (1958)
- Invasion of the Saucer Men (1957)
- Army Bound (1952)
- Amazon Quest (1949)
- Racing Luck (1948)
- The Strange Mrs. Crane (1948)
- Rusty Leads the Way (1948)
- My Dog Rusty (1948)
- The Son of Rusty (1947)
- Blondie Knows Best (1946)
- A Guy Could Change (1946)
- Carolina Blues (1944)
- Nine Girls (1944)
- A Gentle Gangster (1943)
- The Devil with Hitler (1942)
- Mississippi Gambler (1942)
- Gang Buster (1942)
- The Mad Doctor of Market Street (1942)
- Stagecoach Buckaroo (1942)
- Invisible Ghost (1941)
- Flying Wild (1941)
- Caught in the Act (1941)
- The Last Alarm (1940)
- Peck's Bad Boy with the Circus (1938)
- The Shadow Strikes (1937)
- Island Captives (1937)
- Trail Dust (1936)
- Kelly of the Secret Service (1936)
- Prison Shadows (1936)
- The Law Rides (1936)
- Framed (1936)
- The Rogues' Tavern (1936)
- Taming the Wild (1936)
- A Face in the Fog (1936)
- The Fighting Coward (1935)
- Bars of Hate (1935)
- Danger Ahead (1935)
- What Price Crime (1935)
- The Devil on Wheels (1934)
- The Lost Jungle (1934)
- The Wolf Dog (1933)
- The Bachelor's Club (1929)
- Riley of the Rainbow Division (1928)
- The Speed Classic (1928)
- Dugan of the Dugouts (1928)
- The Albany Night Boat (1928)
