= Hey, Taxi! =

1925 film

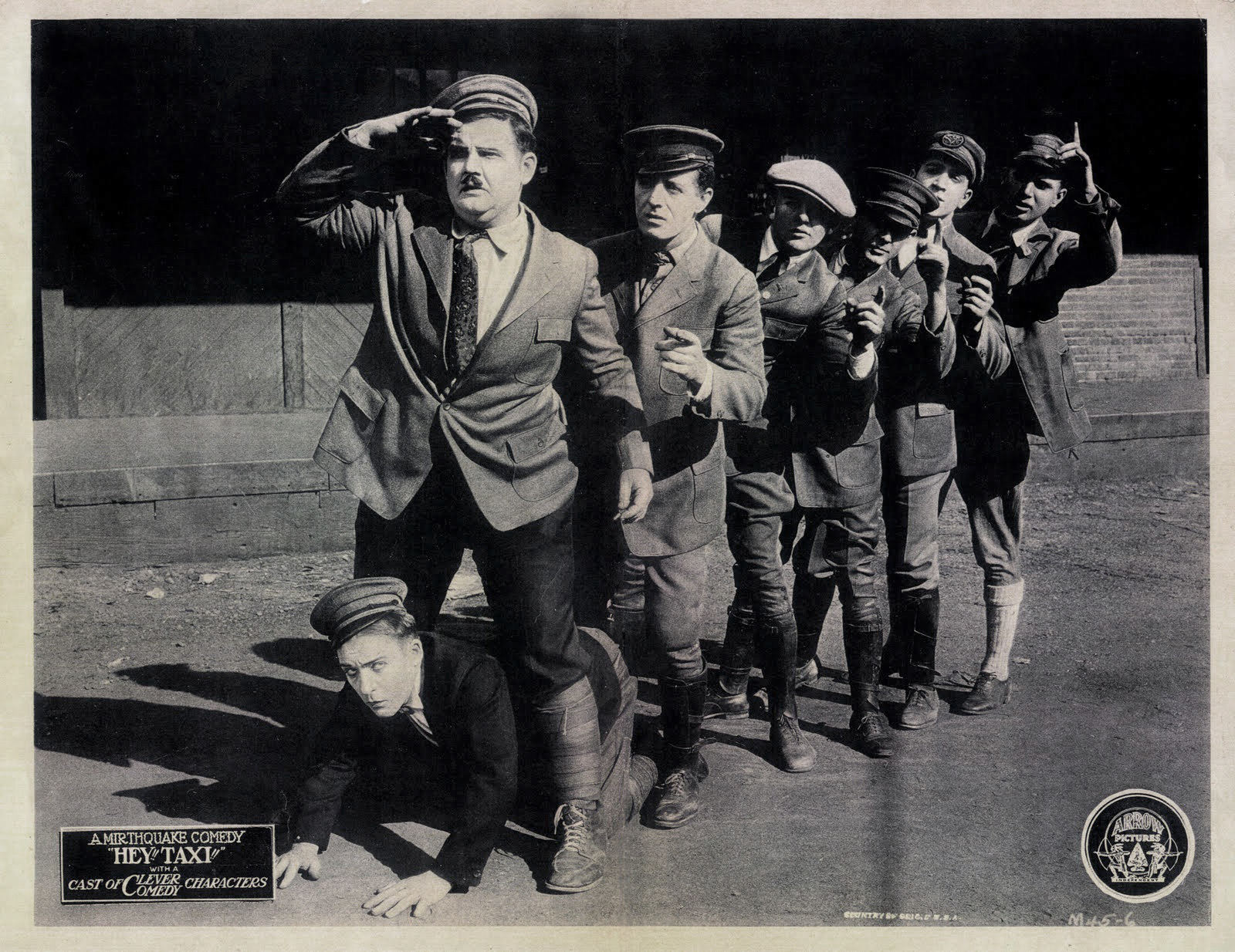
- Directed by: Ted Burnsten
- Produced by: Billy West
- Starring: Oliver Hardy
- Release date: April 1, 1925
- Country: United States
- Languages: Silent film English intertitles

Hey, Taxi! is a 1925 American silent short comedy film featuring Oliver Hardy.

== Plot ==
According to the copyright description, "Lined up at the curb, were the usual row of taxis, awaiting the "5.15". Bobbie, spraying his carbureter [sic] with perfume, hopped into his taxi and joined the line up. SPLASH! he has ruined the appearance of a rival taxi driver, who, thought he was the personal answer to a maiden's prayer and was consequently all polished up. Unconscious of having made an enemy, Bobbie lined up with "the trade" and joined in the song of "Hey! Taxi!", but being short, the other fellows get in his way-turning around to get a better place of vantage, he met the enraged eye of his rival. Ducking, he ran through the legs of the driver, till he reached the front, but friend rival had relentlessly pursued him.

A customer! Bobbie grabbed one end of the customer's suit-case, his rival the other-between them they ruined it. The rival, determined Bobbie would not get it, hurled it into space-it hit the customer, knocking him down. Sitting up he dived among the debris which once resembled a suitcase and brought out a bottle of "hootch" which had miraculously escaped destruction. The rival driver gave Bobbie a sock which completely bowled him over.

Another customer! This time a girl, so dumb she thought Ma Jongg was the laundry man's mother. The rival, his taxi only aside line, donned the badge of a guide, accosted her and "Hey, Taxi." Bobbie, scenting danger, pulled up his collar and drove up to the curb. They climbed in-she wished to be guided to Woolworth's. Arguing with Bobbie as to the correct way, the rival recognized him and in the scuffle was pitched out into the road. He hailed another taxi and followed Bobbie, hurled him out and got in beside the girl. He took---her to the house of a bartender, who was so optimistic that that he still paid his dues to the Union, where he bound and gagged her. Bobbie arrived so light headed that he could have floated in a bathtub. His rival grabbed him and proceeded to hammer the life out of him, leaving him for dead.

In the meantime, two taxi drivers whom the rival had hired to follow Bobbie and failed to pay, arrived, smashing the door, they dashed upstairs. Grappling with the drivers, the rival failed to notice Bobbie sneak in the window, and Bobbie, thinking the bulge in the portiers his rival, clubbed it; instead it was the drivers whom he kindly finished for his rl1. On seeing his rival, he dived out of the window into pile of hay. The rival followed, but Bobbie having pushed away the hay, he fell into the mud.

Bobbie, in his haste to escape, knocked over two men and took refuge under a barrel; the rival enlisted the aid of the men and armed with clubs they chased Bobbie, but each barrel walked away and they didn't know where they were at. The rival got under a barrel in order to find out and instructed the men to hit the first barrel which walked. It happened to be the one he was under. Bobbie escaped and hearing the girl's cries for help, called out, "Jump sweet Butterine, your Oleomargerine is waiting for you". Together they fled in a taxi, the rival after them in another. Catching up to them, the rival threw Bobbie out and climbed in beside the girl. Coming to a yawning chasm, the wheel came off in his hand and, jumping out he left the girl to almost certain death, but brave Bobbie lassoed her just in time as the car over-turned and crashed down the chasm. Just as he was about to embrace the girl, the rival jumped on him. Gradually opening his eyes, Bobbie suddenly realized it was all a horrible dream-the girl was in the arms of the rival whom she declared was her happy husband. Bobby faded into oblivion, only too glad to fade away somewhere."

== Cast ==
- Bobby Ray as Taxi driver
- Oliver Hardy as A rival taxi driver (as Babe Hardy)

== See also ==
- List of American films of 1925
