= Children of Dust =

1923 film by Frank Borzage

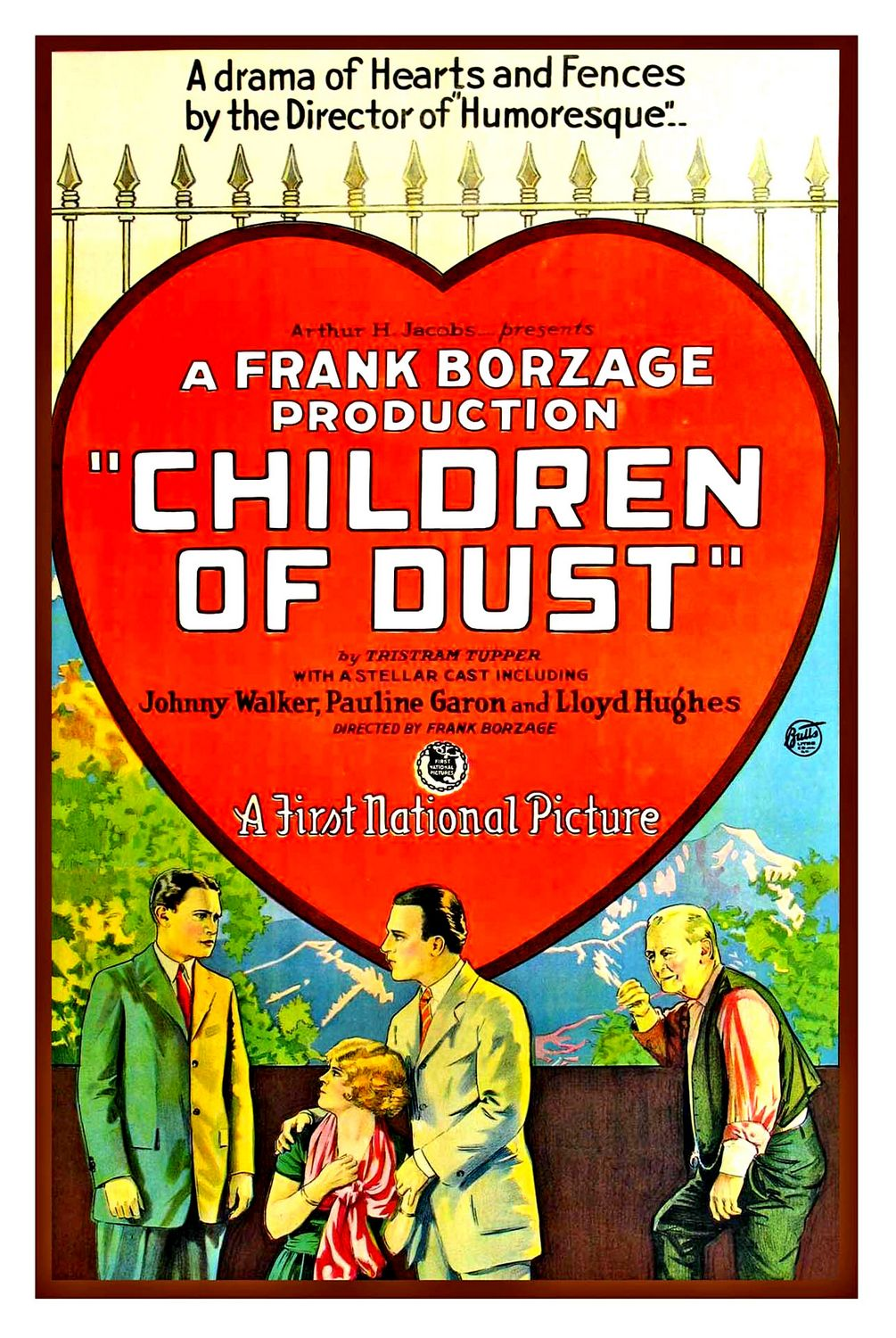
- Poster
- Directed by: Frank Borzage
- Written by: Frank Mitchell Dazey; Agnes Christine Johnston
- Story by: Tristram Tupper
- Produced by: Arthur H. Jacobs
- Starring: Johnnie Walker; Pauline Garon; Lloyd Hughes
- Cinematography: Chester A. Lyons
- Edited by: Howard Bretherton
- Production company: Arthur H. Jacobs Corporation
- Distributed by: First National Pictures
- Release date: June 4, 1923
- Running time: 7 reels
- Country: United States
- Language: Silent (English intertitles)

Children of Dust is a 1923 American silent drama film directed by Frank Borzage and starring Johnnie Walker, Pauline Garon, and Lloyd Hughes.

== Cast ==
- Johnnie Walker as Terwilliger
- Pauline Garon as Helen Raymond
- Lloyd Hughes as Harvey Livermore
- Bert Woodruff as Old Archer
- George Nichols as Terwilliger's stepfather
- Mary Carr as Terwilliger's mother
- Frankie Lee as young Terwilliger
- Josephine Adair as young Helen Raymond
- Newton Hall as young Harvey Livermore

== Bibliography ==
- Munden, Kenneth White. The American Film Institute Catalog of Motion Pictures Produced in the United States, Part 1. University of California Press, 1997.
