= The Moral Sinner =

1924 film by Ralph Ince

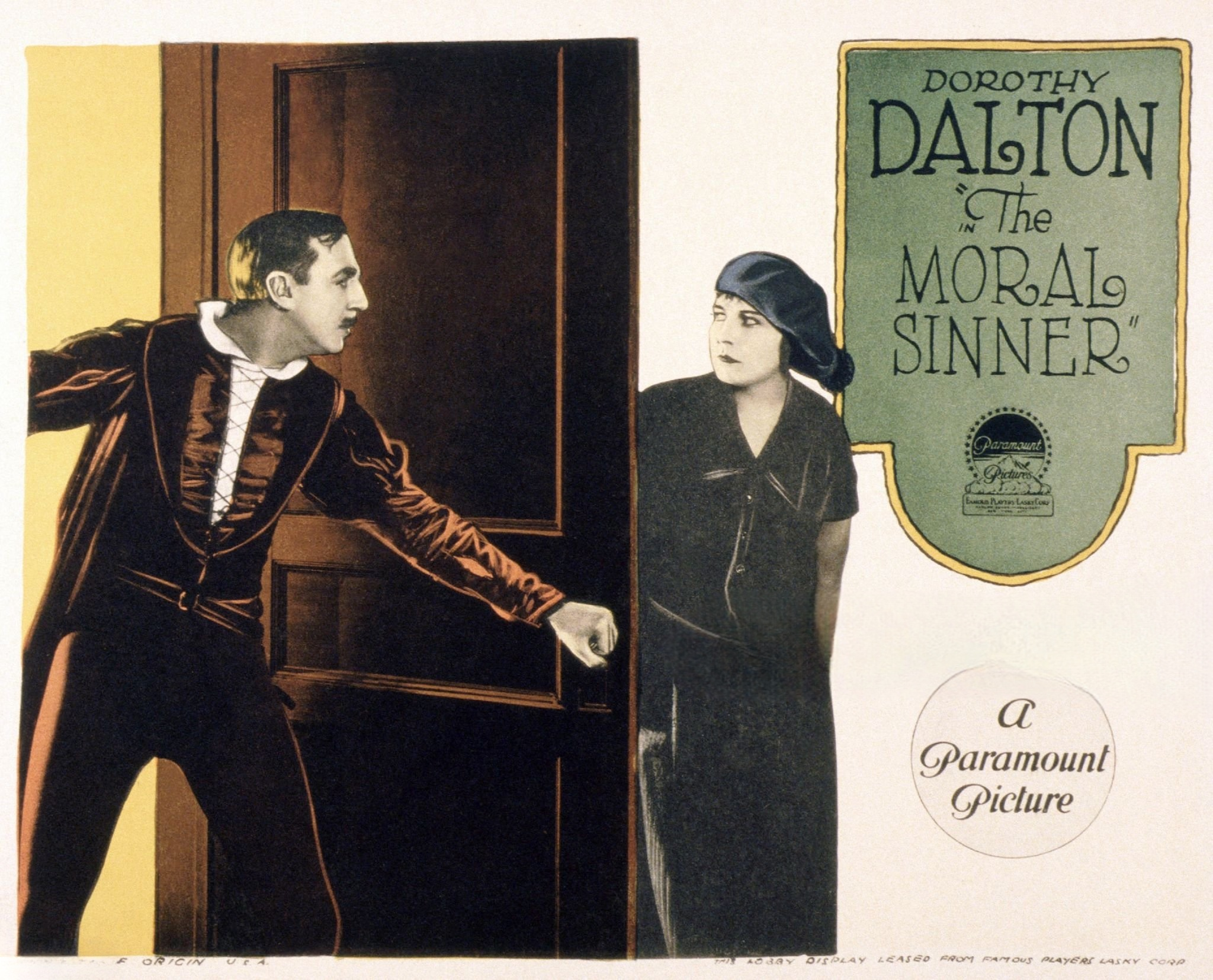
- Lobby card
- Directed by: Ralph Ince
- Screenplay by: C. M. S. McLellan; J. Clarkson Miller
- Based on: Leah Kleschna by C. M. S. McLellan
- Produced by: Jesse L. Lasky; Adolph Zukor
- Starring: Dorothy Dalton; James Rennie; Alphonse Ethier; Frederick Lewis; Walter Percival; Paul McAllister
- Cinematography: William Miller
- Production company: Famous Players–Lasky Corporation
- Distributed by: Paramount Pictures
- Release date: May 19, 1924
- Running time: 60 minutes
- Country: United States
- Language: Silent (English intertitles)

The Moral Sinner is a 1924 American silent drama film directed by Ralph Ince and written by Willis Goldbeck, Josephine Quirk, and Rita Weiman, based on the 1904 play Leah Kleschna by C. M. S. McLellan. The film stars Dorothy Dalton, James Rennie, Alphonse Ethier, Frederick Lewis, Walter Percival, and Paul McAllister. The film was released on May 19, 1924, by Paramount Pictures.

The film is a remake of an early 1913 Adolph Zukor produced film, Leah Kleschna.

== Plot ==
As described in a film magazine review, Anton Kleschna, a crook, has his daughter Leah for an accomplice and uses Raoul Berton, son of a French general, as a tool. Paul Sylvain rescues Leah from a burning building and she forms an attachment for him. She is sent to his study to steal the Sylvain diamonds, but is detected by Paul. Raoul appears half drunk, and Paul hides Leah. Meanwhile, Raoul gets the valuables. They are restored to Paul by Leah. She resolves to go straight and works in the fields with the peasants. There Paul finds her and persuades her to become his wife.

== Cast ==
- Dorothy Dalton as Leah Kleschna
- James Rennie as Paul Sylvain
- Alphonse Ethier as Anton Kleschna
- Frederick Lewis as Schram
- Walter Percival as Raoul Berton
- Paul McAllister as Gen. Berton
- Florence Fair as Claire Berton

== Censorship ==
Before The Moral Sinner could be exhibited in Kansas, the Kansas Board of Review required the elimination of a reel 1 scene, where a woman is robbing a safe, and the reel 3 title saying "Damn you... thief."

== Preservation ==
With no copies of The Moral Sinner located in any film archives, it is a lost film.
