= Gardner James =

American actor

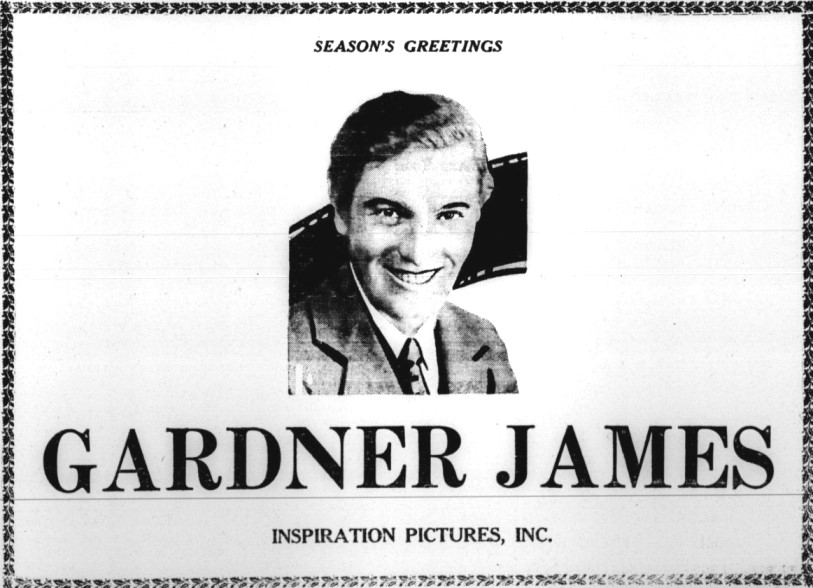
- 1926 Season's Greetings
- Born: March 16, 1903; New York, New York, United States
- Died: June 23, 1953 (aged 50); Los Angeles, California, United States
- Occupation: Actor
- Years active: 1922–1940 (film)

Gardner James (1903–1953) was an American film actor.

In 1925 James traveled to Los Angeles as a coal-hand on a vessel. In 1926 he signed a five-year contract with Inspiration Pictures.

After some stage experience with George Arliss, he entered silent films in 1922. While he once played a lead role, he was often billed third in the cast.

He was married to the actress and writer Marian Constance Blackton, daughter of the founder of Vitagraph Studios, but this rapidly ended in divorce.

== Filmography ==
- Beyond the Rainbow (1922)
- The Love Bandit (1924)
- Unrestrained Youth (1925)
- Silent Sanderson (1925)
- The Happy Warrior (1925)
- The Night Patrol (1926)
- Hell-Bent for Heaven (1926)
- The Passionate Quest (1926)
- The Amateur Gentleman (1926)
- The Flaming Forest (1926)
- The Gilded Highway (1926)
- Ladies at Ease (1927)
- Eager Lips (1927)
- The Little Shepherd of Kingdom Come (1928)
- The Big Killing (1928)
- The Mating Call (1928)
- The Wreck of the Singapore (1928)
- The Studio Murder Mystery (1929)
- The Flying Fleet (1929)
- The Dawn Patrol (1930)
- The Great Meadow (1931)
- Bright Eyes (1934)
- Captain Blood (1935)
- Dante's Inferno' (1935)
- The White Angel (1936)
- Crash Donovan (1936)
- Adventures of Red Ryder (1940)

== Bibliography ==
- Katchmer, George A. A Biographical Dictionary of Silent Film Western Actors and Actresses. McFarland, 2015.
