= Trilby (1915 film) =

1915 silent film

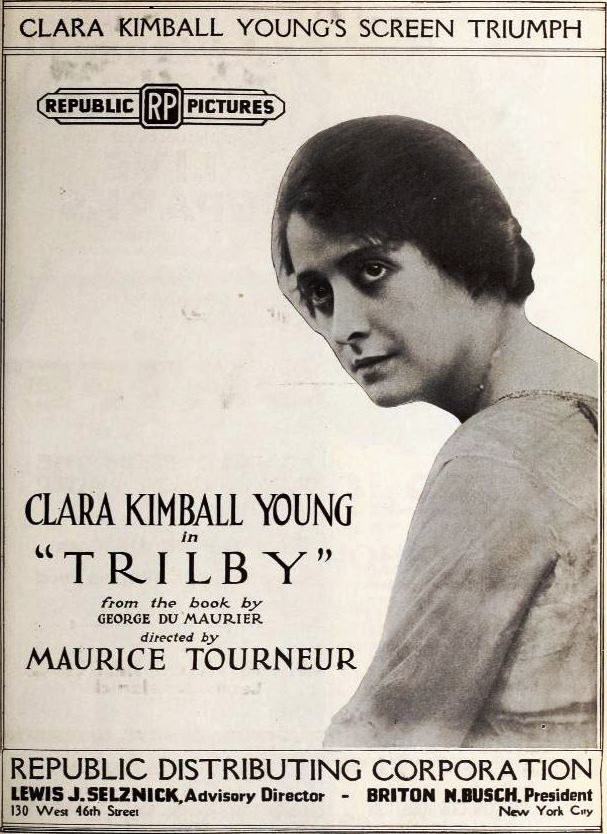
- Advertisement for 1920 reissue of film
- Directed by: Maurice Tourneur
- Written by: George du Maurier (novel); E. Magnus Ingleton; Paul M. Potter (play)
- Starring: Wilton Lackaye; Clara Kimball Young; Paul McAllister
- Edited by: Clarence Brown
- Production company: Equitable Motion Pictures Corporation
- Distributed by: World Film Company
- Release date: September 20, 1915
- Running time: 59 minutes
- Country: United States
- Language: Silent (English intertitles)

Trilby is a 1915 American silent drama film directed by Maurice Tourneur and starring Wilton Lackaye, Clara Kimball Young, and Paul McAllister. It is an adaptation of the 1894 novel Trilby by George du Maurier. The film's sets were designed by art director Ben Carré.

== Plot ==
In France, a beautiful young model named Trilby meets three Bohemians (Little Billee, the Laird, and Taffy) and they all become friends. Trilby and Billee fall in love, but their happiness is thwarted by an evil mesmerist named Svengali, who becomes obsessed with having Trilby for himself. On the night Little Billee is to propose to Trilby, Svengali kidnaps her via hypnotism and takes her away with him to England where he uses his supernatural powers to turn her into a talented singer. Svengali must use all his will power to maintain a hold over the girl, and the stress begins to take a toll on his heart. When he suffers an attack, Trilby appears to become her old self again, but when he recovers, she lapses back into zombie mode. Svengali finally dies, and Trilby's voice reverts to her former gruff form, and the audience boos her off the stage (in the redone ending). Trilby returns to normalcy and the last scene shows her reunited with her friends with a smile on her lips. The title card reads "A promise of good old times again".

The original version of the film had Trilby dying during the last scene (as it occurs in the novel), and this version premiered in New York City at the 44th Street Theatre on September 6, 1915. It went into general release on September 20, 1915, with her death scene intact. In 1917, when the film was re-released, the ending was altered with newly filmed footage so that Trilby remained alive in the film's finale. So technically, two different versions of this film existed.

== Cast ==
- Clara Kimball Young as Trilby O'Ferral
- Wilton Lackaye as Svengali
- Paul McAllister as Gecko
- Phyllis Neilson-Terry
- Chester Barnett
- James Young

== Reception ==
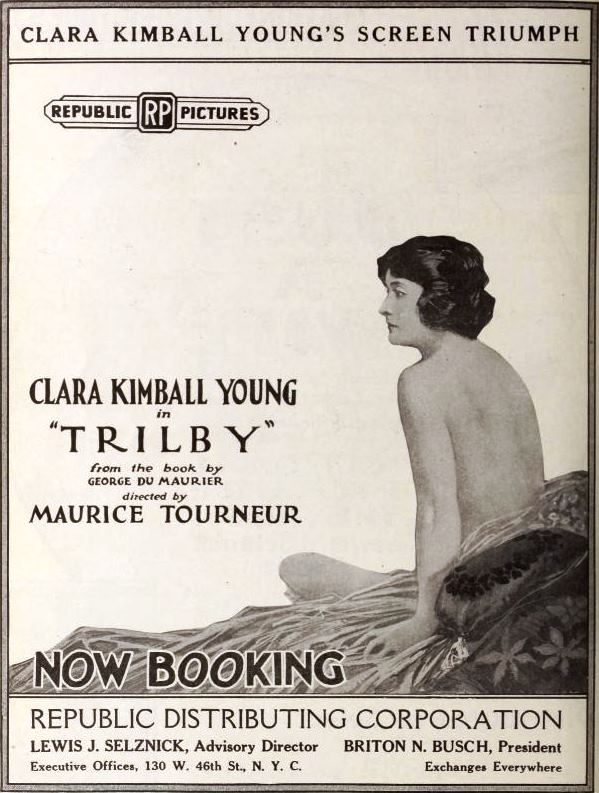
Advertisement promoting the film's nudity despite it only shown using long shots on two intertitles

The film did not receive great reviews. Variety said Wilton Lackey's performance as Svengali was "a distinct disappointment", opining that the actor "ludicrously underplayed" the role and was too overweight for the part, a fact made even more obvious by the producers putting him in clothes that were too small for him. They also felt Clara Kimball Young was too old for the part (she was 25 at the time). Critics over the years have regarded the 1923 film version to be superior, according to author and critic Christopher Workman.

== Censorship ==
Consistent with the novel, the film shows Trilby while modeling in the nude, but only from the back in two long shots shown as stills on intertitles. In other modeling shots, her nudity is implied, an artist's easel blocking direct views. Although nudity in film in 1915 was rare, often sensational, and typically cut by censors, the National Board of Motion Picture Censorship passed the film. As the Board's decisions were nonbinding, censorship boards in cities and states with stricter rules were still free to cut these scenes.

== Preservation ==
A complete copy of Trilby is held in the George Eastman Museum Motion Picture Collection and it has been released on DVD.

== Bibliography ==
- Waldman, Harry. Maurice Tourneur: The Life and Films. McFarland, 2001.
