= Noah's Ark (1928 film) =

1928 film

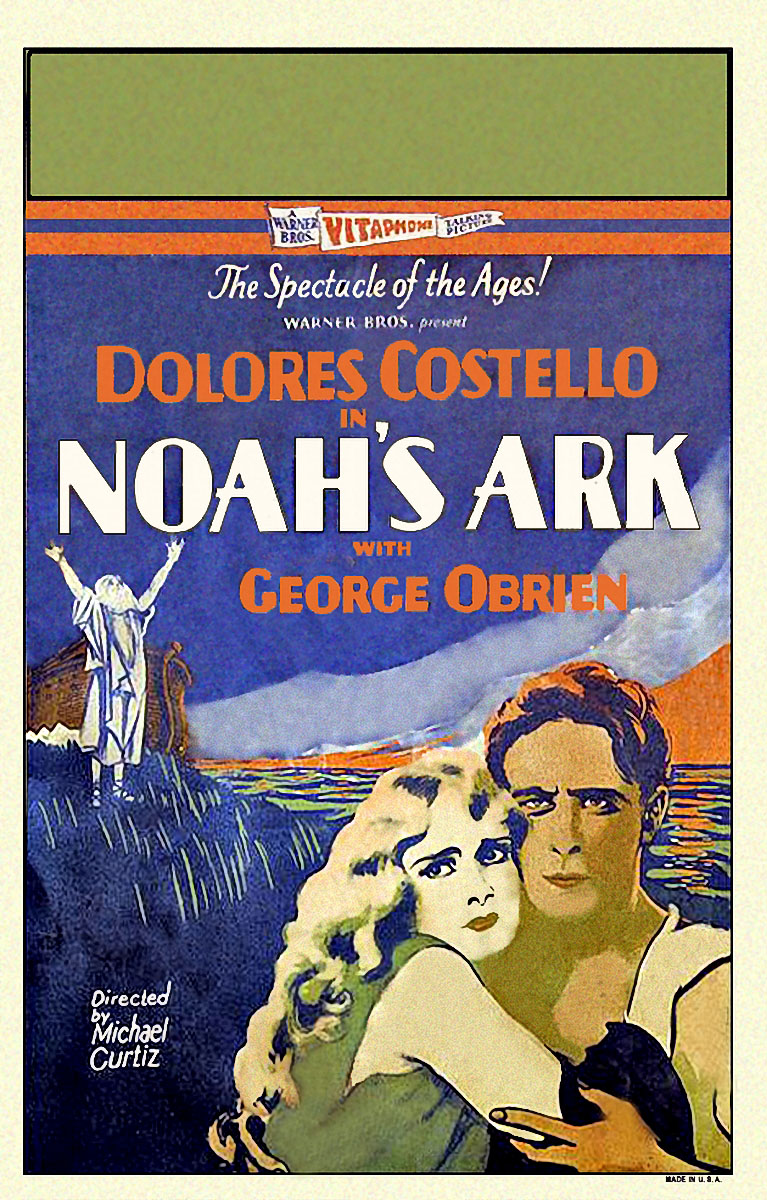
- Theatrical release poster
- Directed by: Michael Curtiz
- Written by: Darryl F. Zanuck (story); Anthony Coldeway (adaptation)
- Starring: Dolores Costello; George O'Brien
- Cinematography: Barney McGill; Hal Mohr
- Edited by: Harold McCord
- Music by: Louis Silvers; Alois Reiser
- Production company: Warner Bros. Pictures
- Distributed by: Warner Bros. Pictures
- Release dates: November 1, 1928 (original cut); June 15, 1929 (US re-release)
- Running time: 135 minutes (original); 108 minutes (restored and edited version)
- Country: United States
- Languages: Sound (Part-Talkie); English intertitles
- Budget: $1,005,000
- Box office: $2,305,000 (worldwide rentals)

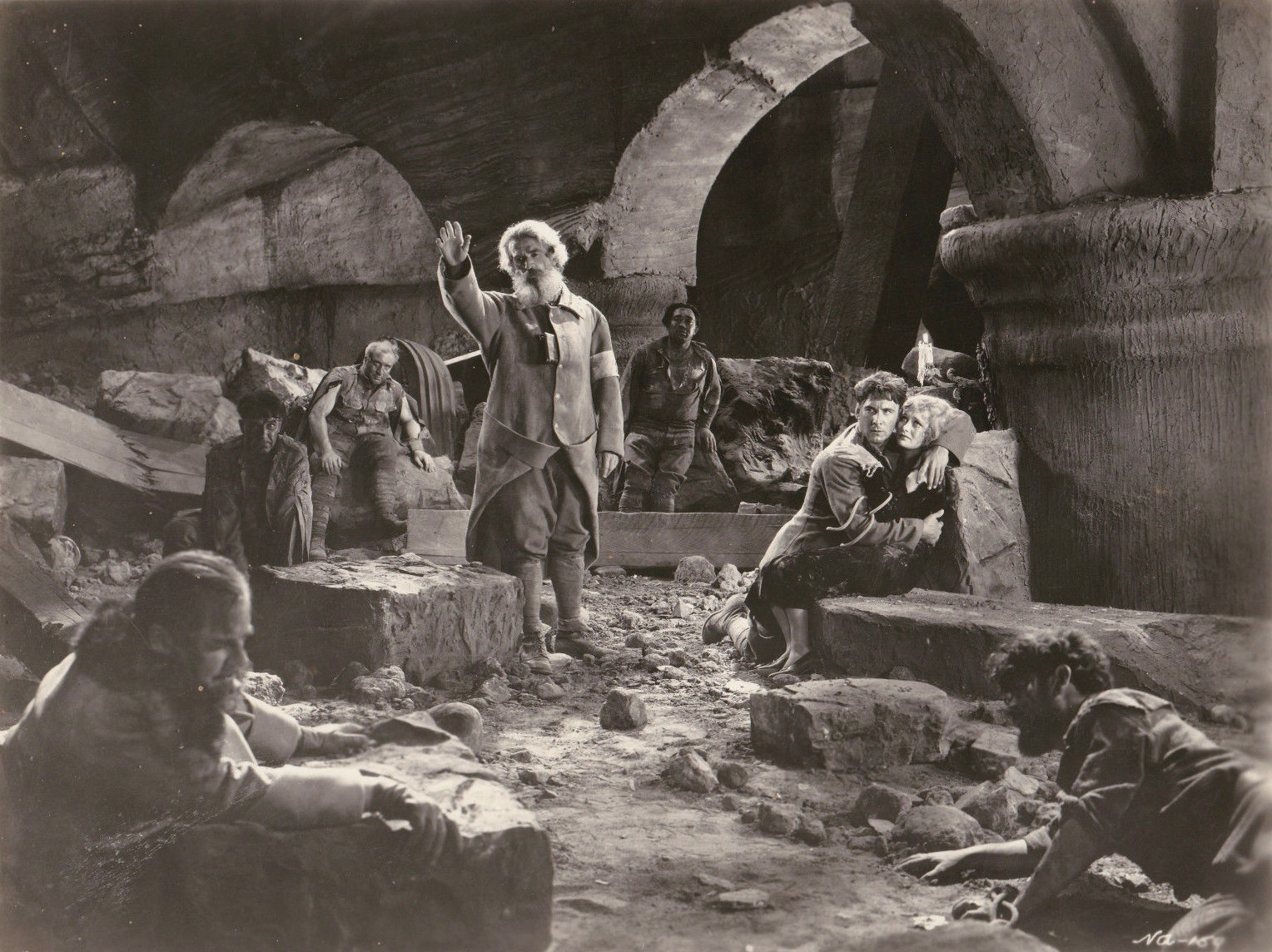
Paul McAllister (center), George O'Brien and Dolores Costello

Noah's Ark is a 1928 American part-talkie epic disaster film directed by Michael Curtiz and starring Dolores Costello and George O'Brien. In addition to sequences with audible dialogue or talking sequences, the film features a synchronized musical score and sound effects along with English intertitles. The soundtrack was recorded using the Vitaphone sound-on-disc system. The story is by Darryl F. Zanuck. The film was released by Warner Bros. Pictures. Most scenes are silent with a synchronized music score and sound effects, in particular the biblical ones, while some scenes have dialogue.

== Plot ==
The reconstructed film

After the Great Flood, Noah and his family are seen outside the Ark praising Jehovah, followed by depictions of the building of the Tower of Babel, the worshipping of the golden calf, and then the eve of World War I, where a bankrupted trader shoots his uncaring stockbroker.

In 1914, American playboy Travis and his friend Al are traveling aboard the Oriental Express. A washed-out bridge causes a deadly derailment. Travis and Al rescue Marie, a German member of a small theatrical troupe, with the help of a prisoner who uncuffed himself from a now-dead escort. At the nearby lodge where they take shelter, fellow survivor Nickoloff, an officer in the Russian secret services, tries to sneak into Marie's room. When Travis objects, a fight breaks out, which is interrupted by French soldiers announcing WWI. Travis, Al and Marie sneak out to Paris together. Travis and Marie fall in love.

Al enlists himself. Despite being married, Travis joins, admired when seeing Al marching. They are each assigned a squad to attack a machine gun nest holding up the American offensive. Travis tosses a hand grenade into the position, not knowing that Al had captured it moments before; Al dies. Nickoloff spots Marie in a group of dancers entertaining the troops, threatening to have her arrested as a German spy unless she meets him later. When she tries to sneak away, she is sentenced to face a firing squad. Travis, also part of the squad, recognizes her. The couple and others are trapped below a demolished building. The minister compares the war and its flood of blood to the biblical flood story.

The film reverts to that time, with the actors playing second roles. King Nephilim has converted his subjects into worshippers of the god Jaghuth. Only Noah and his family remain faithful to Jehovah. Following His command, Noah and his three sons begin building the Ark on a mountainside. Nephilim orders the sacrifice of the most beautiful virgin in his realm to his god in a month. His soldiers choose Miriam, a handmaiden of Noah's. When Noah's son Japheth tries to save her, he is blinded and set to labor turning a stonemill with other prisoners. Just as Miriam is about to be slain, Jehovah unleashes his wrath, with the great flood destroying and drowning everything in its path. Among the chaos, Japheth, freed from his chains, finds and carries Miriam back to the Ark, where Jehovah restores his sight. Nephilim tries to climb aboard the Ark, only to have the door slam on his hand, inflicting the same injuries Nickoloff suffered.

Returning to World War I, the trapped group is freed, an armistice agreement is signed, and the war is over.

== Cast ==
- Dolores Costello as Marie / Miriam
- George O'Brien as Travis / Japheth
- Noah Beery as Nickoloff / King Nephilim
- Louise Fazenda as Hilda / Tavern Maid
- Guinn 'Big Boy' Williams as Al / Ham
- Paul McAllister as Minister / Noah
- Myrna Loy as Dancer / Slave Girl
- Anders Randolf as The German / Leader of soldiers
- Armand Kaliz as The Frenchman / Leader of the King's Guard
- William V. Mong as Innkeeper / Guard
- Malcolm Waite as The Balkan / Shem
- Nigel De Brulier as Soldier / High Priest
- Noble Johnson as Slave broker
- Otto Hoffman as Trader

Cast notes

- John Wayne, Andy Devine and Ward Bond were among the hundreds of extras in the flood scene. Wayne also worked in the prop department for the film.

== Songs ==
- "Heart o' Mine" - music by Louis Silvers, lyrics by Billy Rose
- "Old Timer" - music by Louis Silvers, lyrics by Billy Rose

== Production ==
Approximately 7,500 extras worked on the film. During the filming of the climactic flood scene, the 600,000 US gallons (2,300,000 L; 500,000 imp gal) of water used was so overwhelming that three extras drowned, one was so badly injured that his leg needed to be amputated, and a number suffered broken limbs and other serious injuries, which led to implementation of stunt safety regulations the following year. Dolores Costello caught a severe case of pneumonia. Thirty-five ambulances attended to the wounded.

Portions of the movie were filmed at the Iverson Movie Ranch in Chatsworth, California, and the location was incorporated into an iconic special effects shot that opens the film. The shot depicts the massive ark "beached" on the giant boulders of the movie ranch's Garden of the Gods, which later would become famous for appearances in hundreds of movies including John Ford's Stagecoach (1939).

== Release and re-release ==
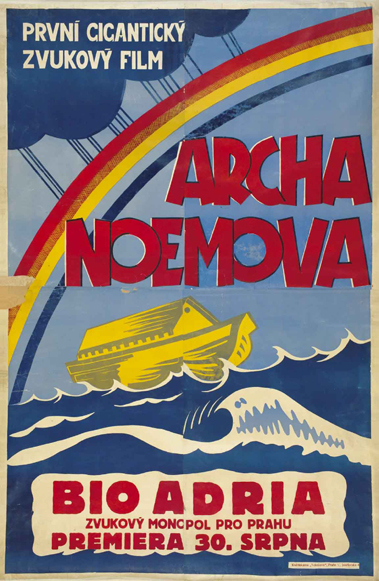
Czech movie poster for the 1930 release in Prague of the sound version

The film premiered at Grauman's Chinese Theatre in Hollywood on November 1, 1928, with a running time of 135 minutes. Originally, it had been planned as a silent film in 1926 for potential release in 1927, but a number of talking sequences were added. (These were directed not by Michael Curtiz but by Roy Del Ruth.) After the premiere, Warner Bros. withdrew the film for extensive revision, which included removing about a half-hour of footage, including all the talking scenes featuring Paul McAllister, who played both a minister and Noah. The film then opened around the country in reserved-seat engagements, after which it concluded its successful run at popular prices, even though by that time "part-talking" films like this one were considered nearly obsolete. Although it had cost far more than any Warner Bros. film to date—over $1 million—it ultimately grossed more than twice its cost.

According to Warner Bros records the film earned $1,367,000 domestically and $938,000 foreign.

The film was re-released in 1957 by Dominant Pictures Corporation, produced by Robert Youngson as a 75-minute-long silent film, with narration added.

== Reception ==
Alva Johnson, writing in The New Yorker, stated that it was "widely conceded to be the worst picture ever made". Mordaunt Hall, writing in The New York Times, stated that "this cumbersome production, one feels that it is a great test of patience". The New York Post's review of the film stated that it was "A solid bore, with a very second rate war story in which everything from The Big Parade to date has been shabbily copied".

NEA Service writer Dan Thomas objected to the part-talkie nature of the film, writing, "Why there was continual jumping from dialogue to written titles was a mystery to me and many others of the first night audience. The effect was bad, as it is in nearly all part dialogue films. When a character opens his mouth, you never know whether or not he is going to speak.”

Positive reviews included that of Doris Denbo from the Hollywood Daily Citizen, arguing, “perhaps never since Intolerance has there been such a sensational spectacle of motion picture photography and sets of such magnitude as are shown in the Bible sequences of Noah’s Ark." Monroe Lathrop of The Los Angeles Evening Express wrote, "Noah’s Ark is a great audience picture, and as an exemplar of the technical possibilities of the cinema stands among the superfilms that have made movie history.” Harry Mines of The Los Angeles Illustrated Daily News called the film, "a mighty drama as strong as the waters of its flood scenes."

== Preservation status ==
The original 2 hour and 15 minute release is believed to be lost. The film has been partially restored to the length of 108 minutes (including overture and exit music) by the UCLA Film and Television Archive in conjunction with the project American Moviemakers: The Dawn of Sound.

A copy of the 1950s television release version is in the Library of Congress.

As a work published in 1928, the film entered the public domain on January 1, 2024.

== Home media ==
The film was released in laserdisc format in October 1993 from MGM/UA Home Video. A DVD version of the restored film was released in 2011 and is available from the Warner Archive Collection.

== See also ==
- John Wayne filmography
- List of film and television accidents
- List of incomplete or partially lost films
- List of early sound feature films (1926–1929)
- List of early Warner Bros. talking features

== Works cited ==
- Medved, Harry; Medved, Michael (1984). The Hollywood Hall of Shame: The Most Expensive Flops in Movie History. Angus & Robertson. ISBN 0207149291.
