= Dugan of the Dugouts =

1928 film

- Directed by: Bobby Ray
- Written by: J.P. McGowan; Al Martin; Bobby Ray
- Produced by: Morris R. Schlank
- Starring: Pauline Garon; Danny O'Shea; Ernest Hilliard
- Cinematography: Robert E. Cline
- Edited by: William Holmes
- Production company: Morris R. Schlank Productions
- Distributed by: Anchor Film Distributors
- Release date: April 15, 1928
- Running time: 55 minutes
- Country: United States
- Languages: Silent; English intertitles

Dugan of the Dugouts is a 1928 American silent comedy film directed by Bobby Ray and starring Pauline Garon, Danny O'Shea and Ernest Hilliard. It was one of two films directed by Ray, a former silent-era film comedian, who later worked as an assistant director.

== Synopsis ==
Because his girlfriend likes the look of a uniform, a young man enlists in the army. They both then get caught up in a foreign spy ring.

== Cast ==
- Pauline Garon as Betty
- Danny O'Shea as Danny Dugan
- Ernest Hilliard as Sgt. Davis
- J.P. McGowan as Capt. von Brinken
- Sid Smith as Danny's Buddy
- Alice Knowland

== Bibliography ==
- Munden, Kenneth White. The American Film Institute Catalog of Motion Pictures Produced in the United States, Part 1. University of California Press, 1997.
