= Stick Around (film) =

1925 film

- The film
- Directed by: Ward Hayes
- Written by: Ward Hayes
- Produced by: Billy West
- Starring: Oliver Hardy
- Cinematography: Harry M. Fowler
- Production company: Cumberland Productions
- Distributed by: Arrow Film Corporation
- Release date: March 1, 1925
- Running time: 24 minutes
- Country: United States
- Language: Silent (English intertitles)

Stick Around is a 1925 American silent comedy film directed by Ward Hayes and starring Oliver Hardy. It was later released as The Paperhanger's Helper.

== Plot ==
A toff-like gent gets his cigarette lit by a chauffeur next to a limo and two young women ask him to sit between them on a bench. He invites them for a ride in his car, not the chauffeur-driven limo but a small roadster behind. One woman slaps him and they walk off.

His car jumps back 10 feet each time he cranks it. A gent crossing the road to greet a woman gets hit during a sudden reverse. He gets covered in soot when the car back-fires. When he reaches the women now in blackface the woman slaps him.

In a workshop Babe Hardy paces up and down looking at the clock, his employee is late. In a sanitarium Dr Brown is hit by plaster falling from the ceiling. A nurse comes to help him. The doctor wants the room repapered.

The toff arrives for work at Babe's garage twenty minutes late. Babe receives a phone call from Dr Brown asking him to repaper the sanitarium. The man pulls a hard-cart full of wallpaper as Babe walks alongside. He falls down an open manhole. He leaves and an ambulance arrives to rescue him. He has to pull the cart up a steep hill. He lets it go and it hits a man next to three billboards. They accidentally pick up the billposters instead of the wallpaper.

They arrive at the sanitarium and Dr Brown says he wants an "artistic" style. The man unpacks impossible big bits of equipment from a small case. We are introduced to some patients, including a bootlegger who drank his own booze. The water urn is filled with alcohol. After a couple of glasses Babe gets more pleasant.

The nurse flirts with the wallpaper man. She kisses him and he faints. In the ward a patient looks for toast; the doctor explains the patient believes himself to be a poached egg. A man uses a mallet to break walnuts on a black man's head. They decorate the room with circus posters. The credit reads that it would make the Ringling Brothers want to kiss Barnum and Bailey.

A long-bearded man watches the tipsy man trying to paste the wallpaper. He pastes his beard onto the pasting table. He cuts his beard to release him. The man is annoyed. With posters pasted over a door a man comes in and gets an ape head picture stuck to his face causing much alarm. Mayhem ensues with paste everywhere. They quit and leave.

== Cast ==
- Bobby Ray as Paperhanger's Helper
- Oliver Hardy as Paperhanger (credited as Babe Hardy)
- Hazel Newman as Nurse Zenia Zane
- Harry McCoy as Dr. Brown

== See also ==
- List of American films of 1925
