= Eager Lips =

1927 film

- Directed by: Wilfred Noy
- Written by: Adele Buffington (story, scenario)
- Produced by: I. E. Chadwick
- Starring: Pauline Garon; Betty Blythe
- Cinematography: Ted Tetzlaff; Ernest Miller
- Production company: Chadwick Pictures
- Distributed by: First Division Pictures
- Release date: July 15, 1927
- Running time: 7 reels
- Country: USA
- Language: Silent..English titles

Eager Lips is a 1927 silent film romantic drama directed by Wilfred Noy and starring Pauline Garon, Betty Blythe and Gardner James. The producer was I.E. Chadwick.

== Cast ==
- Pauline Garon - Mary Lee
- Betty Blythe - Paula
- Gardner James - Bill Armstrong
- Jack Richardson - Tony Tyler
- Evelyn Selbie - Miss Lee
- Fred Warren - Clancy
- Erin La Bissoniere - Charmonta

== Preservation status ==
- The film is preserved in the Library of Congress collection.
