= Christine of the Big Tops =

1926 film

- Directed by: Archie Mayo
- Written by: Sonya Levien
- Produced by: Banner Productions
- Distributed by: Sterling Pictures Distributing Corp. Independent Sales Corp. Enterprise Distributing Corp. J.H. Hoffberg Company; Argosy Pictures (UK); British & Continental Trading Company (UK, Europe); Excellent Film Exchange (Canada); Equity British Films (UK rerelease)
- Release date: August 1926
- Running time: 65 minutes
- Country: United States
- Language: Silent (English intertitles)

Christine of the Big Tops is a 1926 American silent romantic drama film starring Pauline Garon and Cullen Landis. It is one of the first films of the prolific Warner's director Archie Mayo.

A copy of the film is in the George Eastman House Motion Picture Collection.

== Cast ==
- Pauline Garon - Christine
- Cullen Landis - Bob Hastings
- Otto Mattiesen - Hagan (*as Otto Matieson)
- Robert Graves - Pete Barman
- John Elliott - Dr. Hastings
- Martha Mattox - Mrs. Hastings
- Betty Noon - Doris
