= The Love of Sunya =

1927 film by Albert Parker

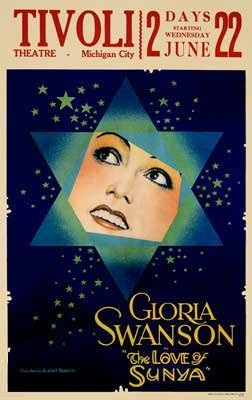
- Directed by: Albert Parker
- Written by: Earle Browne (adaptation); Cosmo Hamilton (titles); Lenore J. Coffee (uncredited)
- Based on: Eyes of Youth by Max Marcin and Charles Guernon
- Produced by: Gloria Swanson
- Starring: Gloria Swanson; John Boles; Pauline Garon
- Cinematography: Robert Martin; George Barnes (uncredited)
- Music by: William P. Perry (1970s re-issue)
- Distributed by: United Artists
- Release date: March 11, 1927
- Running time: 78 minutes
- Country: United States
- Language: Silent (English intertitles)

The full film

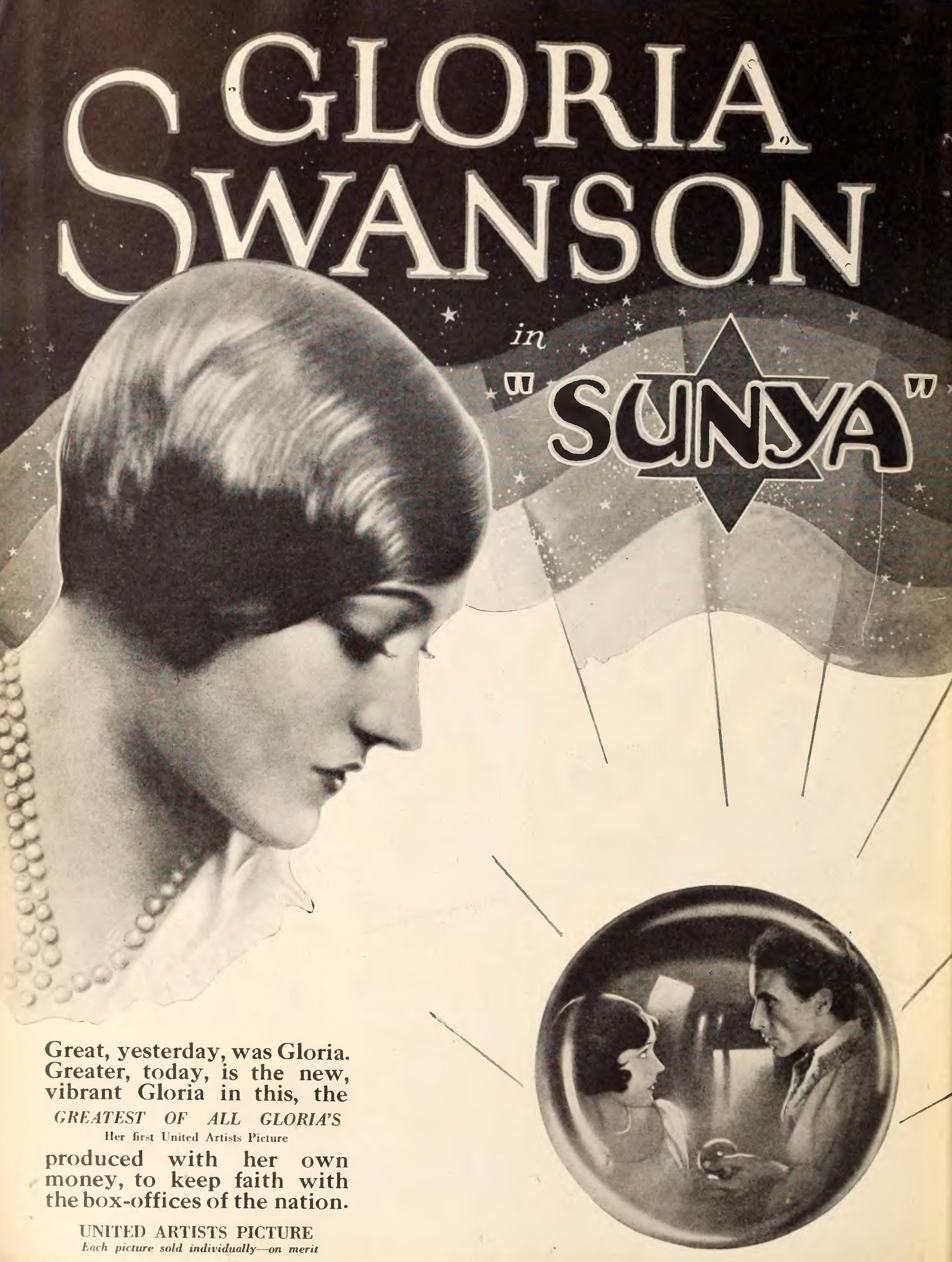
Advertisement in 1927 Motion Picture News

The Love of Sunya (also known as The Loves of Sunya) is a 1927 American silent drama film directed by Albert Parker and based on the play Eyes of Youth by Max Marcin and Charles Guernon. Produced by and starring Gloria Swanson, it also stars John Boles and Pauline Garon. A copy of The Love of Sunya survives in the Paul Killiam collection.

== Plot ==
A young woman is given by a mystic an occasional glimpse into her future, notably her future with different men.

== Cast ==
- Gloria Swanson as Sunya Ashling
- John Boles as Paul Judson
- Pauline Garon as Anna Hagan
- Ian Keith as Louis Anthony
- Andres de Segurola as Paola deSalvo
- Anders Randolf as Robert Goring
- Hugh Miller as The Outcast
- Robert Schable as Henri Picard
- Ivan Lebedeff as Ted Morgan
- John Miltern as Asa Ashling
- Raymond Hackett as Kenneth Ashling
- Florence Fair as Rita Ashling

== Production ==
The film was Swanson's first independent production; she later called it an "agonizing ordeal". She chose to film another adaptation of Max Marcin and Charles Guernon's play, for it had been filmed once before in 1919, starring Clara Kimball Young, and was a resounding success on Broadway. Swanson hired Albert Parker, who had directed the 1919 film, in the hope, given that Parker was already familiar with the material, that the production would be quicker.

Swanson ignored advice to shoot the film in Hollywood and opted to rent space in William Randolph Hearst's Cosmopolitan Studios in New York City. Production began in September 1926 but problems quickly arose due to Swanson's lack of experience as a producer. The production soon ran over budget and was marred by several other problems, mainly the lack of a suitable cameraman to deal with the film's intricate double exposures. According to Swanson's autobiography, the services of cinematographer George Barnes were eventually secured, though he is given no screen credit.

== Reception ==
The Love of Sunya premiered at the grand opening of the Roxy Theatre in New York City on March 11, 1927. Swanson later wrote that the film received a standing ovation. Despite this initial good reception and decent reviews from critics, the film performed poorly at the box office, and barely recouped its budget. Swanson felt it was terrible. Owing to its failure, producer Joseph M. Schenck convinced Swanson to come back to Hollywood and to film something more commercial. Swanson agreed but ended up filming the more controversial Sadie Thompson (1928) instead, which became her most successful independent production.
