= Riley of the Rainbow Division =

1928 film

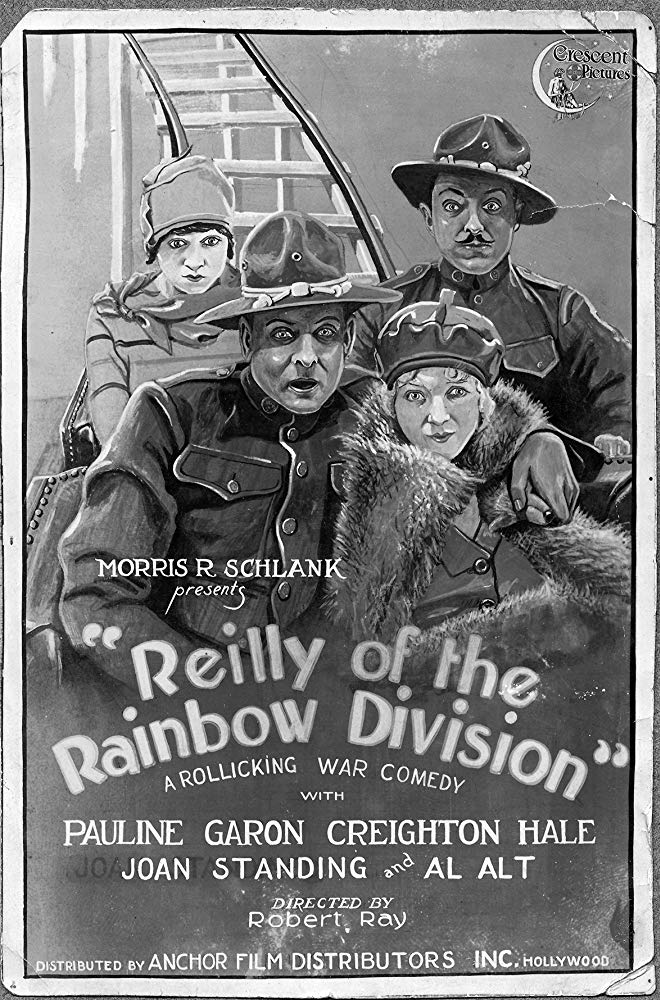
- Directed by: Bobby Ray
- Written by: Arthur Hoerl; Al Martin
- Produced by: Morris R. Schlank
- Starring: Creighton Hale; Al Alt; Pauline Garon
- Cinematography: Harry Forbes
- Edited by: Dave Rothschild
- Production company: Crescent Pictures
- Distributed by: Anchor Film Distributors
- Release date: July 15, 1928
- Running time: 60 minutes
- Country: United States
- Languages: Silent; English intertitles

Riley of the Rainbow Division is a 1928 American silent war comedy film directed by Bobby Ray and starring Creighton Hale, Al Alt and Pauline Garon. In Britain, it was released under the alternative title of Flappers in Khaki.

== Synopsis ==
Following America's entry into World War I, two friends enlist as doughboys. However, their fiancées decide they want to marry them before they go off to war. The women enter their training camp in disguise. They end up accompanying them to Europe where they become embroiled with German spies.

== Cast ==
- Creighton Hale as Riley
- Al Alt as Henry Graham
- Pauline Garon as Gertie Bowers
- Joan Standing as Mabel
- Jack Carlyle as Sgt. McMullen
- Lafe McKee
- Rolfe Sedan
- Jack Raymond
