= Ladies at Ease =

1927 American silent comedy film

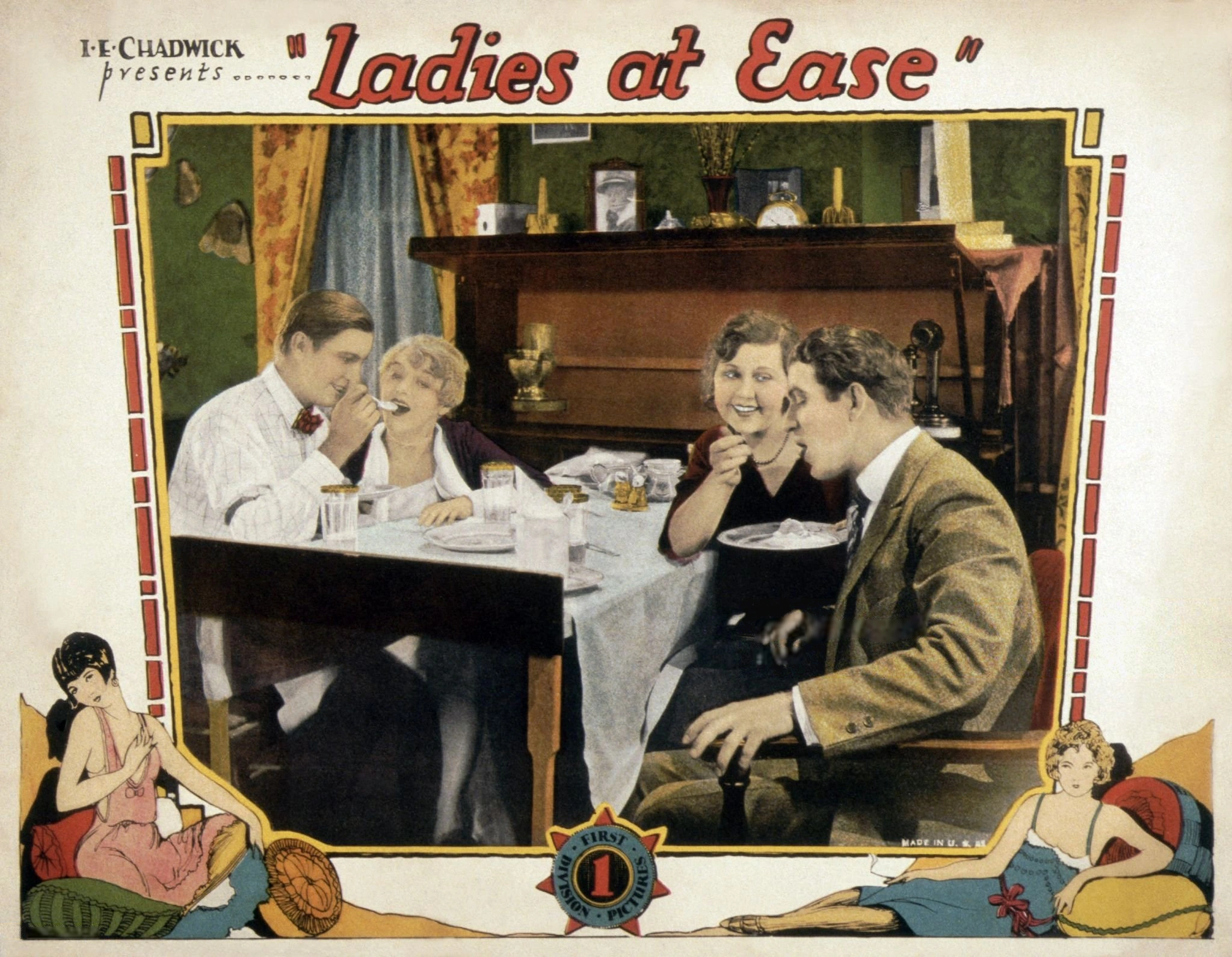
- Directed by: Jerome Storm
- Written by: Jean La'Ple; Leon Lee; Rob Wagner
- Produced by: I.E. Chadwick; Leon Lee
- Starring: Pauline Garon; Gertrude Short; Gardner James
- Cinematography: Ernest Miller
- Edited by: Gene Milford
- Production company: Chadwick Pictures
- Distributed by: First Division Pictures; Butcher's Film Service (UK)
- Release date: August 15, 1927
- Running time: 60 minutes
- Country: United States
- Languages: Silent (English intertitles)

Ladies at Ease is a 1927 American silent comedy film directed by Jerome Storm and starring Pauline Garon, Gertrude Short and Gardner James. A print of this film exists.

== Cast ==
- Pauline Garon as Polly
- Gertrude Short as Mabel
- Gardner James as Bill Brewster
- Bob Custer as Buck Bevin
- Lillian Hackett as Mae Dotty
- Jean Van Vliet as June Dotty
- William H. Strauss as Abe Ginsburg
- Charles Meakin as John McMay

== Bibliography ==
- Munden, Kenneth White. The American Film Institute Catalog of Motion Pictures Produced in the United States, Part 1. University of California Press, 1997.
