= Pauline Garon =

Canadian actress (1900–1965)

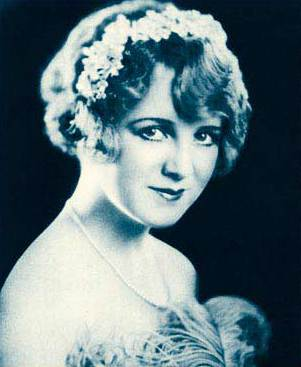
- Stars of the Photoplay, 1924
- Born: Marie Pauline Garon; September 9, 1900; Montreal, Quebec, Canada
- Died: August 30, 1965 (aged 64); San Bernardino, California, US
- Occupation: Actress
- Years active: 1920–1935
- Spouses: Lowell Sherman (m. 1926; div. 1929) Clyde Harland Alban (m. 1940; div. 1942) Ross Wilson Forester (m. 1953; died 1964)

Marie Pauline Garon (September 9, 1900 – August 30, 1965) was a Canadian silent film, feature film, and stage actress.

== Early life ==
Marie Pauline Garon was born in Montreal, Quebec, Canada, the youngest of 11 children of Pierre-Auguste Garon and Victoria Connick. She was of French and Irish descent. Her father first worked for the Canadian postal department, then worked at an insurance agency.

She did not learn English until she was ten years old. Her parents managed to afford to send her to the Couvent Sacré-Coeur (Sacred Heart Convent) in Montreal, one of the most prestigious schools in the city, for seven years. She was the first graduate of the institution to perform in the theatre.

== Career ==
At around 20 years old, she ran away to New York City where she began work on Broadway.

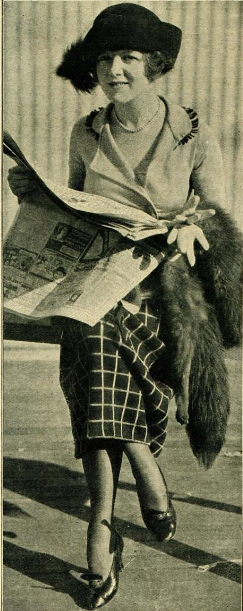
Garon, 1923

Garon made her film debut in Remodeling Her Husband as a body double for Dorothy Gish. She was associated with D.W. Griffith when she first came to Hollywood in 1920. Garon's first important role came in 1921's The Power Within. She also played the body double for Sylvia Breamer in Doubling for Romeo (1921).

A steadily rising star, she appeared opposite Owen Moore in Reported Missing (1922). Garon received much praise for her role in Henry King's adaptation of Sonny (1922). King chose her after seeing her perform in the stage production on Broadway. She co-starred with Richard Barthelmess in the First National Pictures release. However, in 1923, she was hailed as Cecil B. DeMille's big new discovery. He cast her in two films, including Adam's Rib (1923). She was selected as one of the WAMPAS Baby Stars in 1923. Garon was making at least five films a year after her popularity soared. She was playing many lead roles in B movies and supporting roles in more glamorous films. She co-starred with Gloria Swanson and John Boles in The Love of Sunya (1927).

By 1928, Garon's career began to decline dramatically. She appeared mostly in French renditions of Paramount Pictures movies. She was cast in less popular English films as well. By the early 1930s, Garon was given small uncredited roles. By 1934, she had vanished from film. Garon played a bit part in How Green Was My Valley (1941) and appeared briefly in two westerns, Song of the Saddle (1936) and The Cowboy and the Blonde (1941).

== Personal life ==
Garon became an American citizen on February 20, 1928.

While filming The Average Woman in 1924 rumors began to spread that Garon had become engaged to Gene Sarazen, a professional golfer. In March 1924 she issued a complete denial of the rumors.

She married three times. She wed Lowell Sherman on February 15, 1926. Sherman's influence led Garon to refuse a long-term contract with Paramount. They separated in August 1927. In February 1940, she eloped to Yuma, Arizona, with radio star and actor Clyde Harland Alban. They divorced in 1942.

She married Ross Forrester, widower of actress Marion Aye, in May 1953 and remained with him until he died.

Garon's health had been precarious many years before her death. She collapsed at the 20th Century Fox studios on June 5, 1952. She was a patient at Patton State Hospital, a psychiatric institution in San Bernardino, California. On August 30, 1965, ten days before her 65th birthday she died from a brain disorder.

== Selected filmography ==
- A Manhattan Knight (1920) – The Daughter
- The Power Within (1921) – Pauline
- Polly of the Follies (1922) – Ziegfeld Beauty Chorus Girl (uncredited)
- Reported Missing (1922) – Pauline Blake
- Sonny (1922) – Florence Crosby
- Manslaughter (1922) – (uncredited)
- The Man from Glengarry (1922) – Mamie St. Clair
- You Can't Fool Your Wife (1923) – Vera Redell
- Children of Dust (1923) – Helen Raymond
- Glengarry School Days (1923) – Margie Baird
- Forgive and Forget (1923) – Virginia Clark
- Adam's Rib (1923) – Mathilda Ramsay
- The Marriage Market (1923) – Theodora Bland
- The Average Woman (1924) – Sally Whipple
- Pal o' Mine (1924) – Babette Hermann
- The Spitfire (1924) – Marcia Walsh
- Wine of Youth (1924) – Tish Tatum
- The Turmoil (1924) – Edith Sheridan
- The Painted Flapper (1924) – Arline Whitney
- What the Butler Saw (1924) – Joan Wyckham
- Speed (1925) – Wiletta Whipple
- Passionate Youth (1925) – Henrietta Rand
- Fighting Youth (1925) – Jean Manley
- Where Was I? (1925) – Claire
- The Love Gamble (1925) – Jennie Howard
- The Great Sensation (1925) – Peggy Howell
- Satan in Sables (1925) – Colette Breton
- The Farmer from Texas (1925) – Miss Abby Grant
- Compromise (1925) – Nathalie
- Rose of the World (1925) – Edith Rogers
- The Splendid Road (1925) – Angel Allie
- Flaming Waters (1925) – Doris Laidlaw
- The Virgin Wife (1926) – Mary Jordan
- Christine of the Big Tops (1926) – Christine
- Driven from Home (1927)
- The Love of Sunya (1927) – Anna Hagan
- The Princess on Broadway (1927) – Mary Ryan
- Eager Lips (1927) – Mary Lee
- Naughty (1927) – The Bride
- Ladies at Ease (1927) – Polly
- The College Hero (1927) – Vivian Saunders
- Temptations of a Shop Girl (1927) – Betty Harrington
- The Heart of Broadway (1928; survives at Library of Congress) – Roberta Clemmons
- The Girl He Didn't Buy (1928) – Ruth Montaigne
- Dugan of the Dugouts (1928) – Betty
- The Devil's Cage (1928) – Eloise
- Riley of the Rainbow Division (1928) – Gertie Bowers
- Must We Marry? (1928) – Betty Jefferson
- The Candy Kid (1928)
- Redskin (1928) – Party Girl (uncredited)
- The Gamblers (1929) – Isabel Emerson
- In the Headlines (1929) – Blondie
- The Show of Shows (1929) – Performer in 'Bicycle Built for Two' Number
- Le spectre vert (1930) – Lady Violette
- The Thoroughbred (1930) – Margie
- Garde la bombe (1930)
- Échec au roi (1931) – Princess Anne
- Le fils de l'autre (1932)
- The Phantom Broadcast (1933) – Nancy
- Easy Millions (1933)
- By Appointment Only (1933) – Gwen Reid
- One Year Later (1933) – Vera Marks
- Wonder Bar (1934) – Telephone Operator (uncredited)
- The Merry Widow (1934) – Lola (French version)
- Lost in the Stratosphere (1934) – Hilda Garon
- The White Cockatoo (1935) – Marianne
- Folies Bergère de Paris (1935) – Lulu
- Becky Sharp (1935) – Fifine
- Going Highbrow (1935) – Josephine – French Maid (uncredited)
- Dangerous (1935) – Betty – Gail's Maid (uncredited)
- It Had to Happen (1936) – French Maid (uncredited)
- Song of the Saddle (1936) – Settler's wife (uncredited)
- Colleen (1936) – Maid (uncredited)
- King of Hockey (1936) – Marie (uncredited)
- Her Husband's Secretary (1937) – Louise, Carol's Maid (uncredited)
- Shall We Dance (1937) – (uncredited)
- Bluebeard's Eighth Wife (1938) – Customer (uncredited)
- Lillian Russell (1940) (uncredited)
- The Cowboy and the Blonde (1941) – Office Worker (uncredited)
- How Green Was My Valley (1941) (uncredited)
- Bunco Squad (1950) – Mary (uncredited) (final film role)
