= Paul McAllister =

American actor

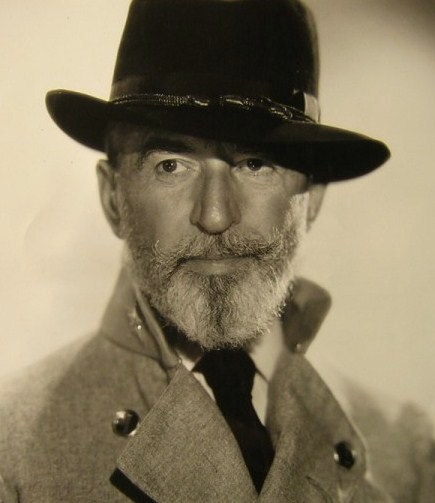
- Film still from Judge Priest (1934)
- Born: June 30, 1875; Brooklyn, New York
- Died: July 8, 1955 (aged 80); Santa Monica, California
- Occupation: Actor
- Spouse: Margaret McKinney

Paul McAllister (June 30, 1875 – July 8, 1955), was an American film actor. He appeared in 37 films between 1913 and 1940.

He was born in Brooklyn, New York and died in Santa Monica, California.

== Filmography ==
Year	Title	Role	Notes
1914	The Scales of Justice	Robert Darrow	
1915	The Man Who Found Himself	Frederick Payton	
1915	Hearts in Exile	Ivan Mikhail	
1915	The Money Master	Moran	
1915	Via Wireless	Marsh	
1915	Trilby	Gecko	
1916	His Brother's Wife	Richard Barton	
1917	The Whip	Baron Sartoris	
1921	The Sign on the Door	District Attorney 'Rud' Whiting	
1921	Forever	Monsieur Seraskier	
1922	A Stage Romance	Count Koefeld	
1922	What's Wrong with the Women?	John Mathews	
1923	You Can't Fool Your Wife	Dr. Konrad Saneck	
1923	Christopher Columbus	King John II of Portugal	
1924	Yolanda	Jules d'Humbercourt	
1924	The Moral Sinner	Gen. Berton	
1924	The Lone Wolf	Count de Morbihan	
1924	Manhandled	Paul Garretson	
1924	For Woman's Favor	The Wolf	
1926	Beau Geste	St. Andre	
1926	The Winning of Barbara Worth	The Seer	
1927	She's a Sheik	Sheik Yusif ben Hamad	
1927	Sorrell and Son	Dr. Orange	
1928	The Big Killing	Old Man Hicks	
1928	Noah's Ark	Minister / Noah	
1929	Evangeline	Benedict Bellefontaine	
1930	The Case of Sergeant Grischa	Corporal Sacht	
1931	Beau Ideal	Sgt. Frederic	
1931	Inspiration	Jouvet, the Artist	
1932	Cock of the Air	Gentleman	Uncredited
1934	Judge Priest	Doc Lake	Uncredited
1935	Mystery Woman	Benton	Uncredited
1936	The Invisible Ray	Papa LaCosta	Uncredited
1936	The Prisoner of Shark Island	Doctor	Uncredited
1936	Fury	Passerby	Uncredited
1936	Mary of Scotland	du Croche	
1940	The Doctor Takes a Wife	Dean Lawton	(final film role)
