= They All Fall =

1925 film

- Directed by: Ralph Ceder
- Written by: Ralph Ceder
- Produced by: Billy West
- Starring: Oliver Hardy
- Release date: August 1, 1925
- Running time: 7 minutes
- Country: United States
- Languages: Silent film English intertitles

They All Fall is a 1925 American comedy film featuring Oliver Hardy. It was preserved by the Academy Film Archive in 2007.

== Cast ==
- Bobby Ray - The assistant janitor
- Oliver Hardy - The boss (as Babe Hardy)

== See also ==
- List of American films of 1925
- Oliver Hardy filmography
