= The Big Killing (1928 film) =

1928 film

- Film poster
- Directed by: F. Richard Jones
- Screenplay by: Frank Butler(scenario); Gilbert Pratt (scenario); Grover Jones (story); Herman J. Mankiewicz (titles)
- Produced by: Jesse L. Lasky; Adolph Zukor
- Starring: Wallace Beery; Raymond Hatton; Anders Randolf; Mary Brian; Gardner James; Lane Chandler; Paul McAllister
- Cinematography: Alfred Gilks
- Production company: Paramount Pictures
- Distributed by: Paramount Pictures
- Release date: July 1, 1928
- Running time: 60 minutes
- Country: United States
- Language: English

The Big Killing is a 1928 American comedy silent film directed by F. Richard Jones and written by Frank Butler. The film stars Wallace Beery, Raymond Hatton, Anders Randolf, Mary Brian, Gardner James, Lane Chandler and Paul McAllister.

The Big Killing was released on July 1, 1928, by Paramount Pictures.

== Plot ==
In a valley of the Appalachian Mountains, the Hicks and Beagle clans are engaged in a violent feud. The Hicks hire Powder-Horn Pete and Dead-Eye Dan, two sharpshooters from a carnival, to eliminate the Beagles. Dan and Pete, who are in actuality poor shots, think they were hired to kill nuisance dogs. Meanwhile, two young people, Jim Hicks and Mary Beagle, are involved in a secret romance.

When Pete and Dan approach the Beagles for the first time, they are forced by a barrage of gunfire to quickly retreat. Not wanting to kill anyone, the two sharpshooters use other tactics to defuse the feud. At the end of the film, the two clans accept the relationship between Jim Hicks and Mary. Together, the two clans run Jim and Dan out of their valley.

== Cast ==
- Wallace Beery as Powderhorn Pete
- Raymond Hatton as Deadeye Dan
- Anders Randolf as Old Man Beagle
- Mary Brian as Old Man Beagle's daughter, Mary Beagle
- Gardner James as Jim Hicks
- Lane Chandler as George Hicks
- Paul McAllister as Old Man Hicks
- James Mason as first Beagle son
- Ralph Yearsley as second Beagle son
- Ethan Laidlaw as third Beagle son
- Leo Willis as fourth Beagle son
- Buck Moulton as fifth Beagle son
- Bob Kortman as sixth Beagle son
- Walter James as Sheriff
- Tiny Ward as Barker

== Preservation status ==
The Big Killing survives in the Library of Congress collections.

== See also ==
Filmography of Wallace Beery
