= Bobby Ray (actor) =

American actor and director (1899–1957)

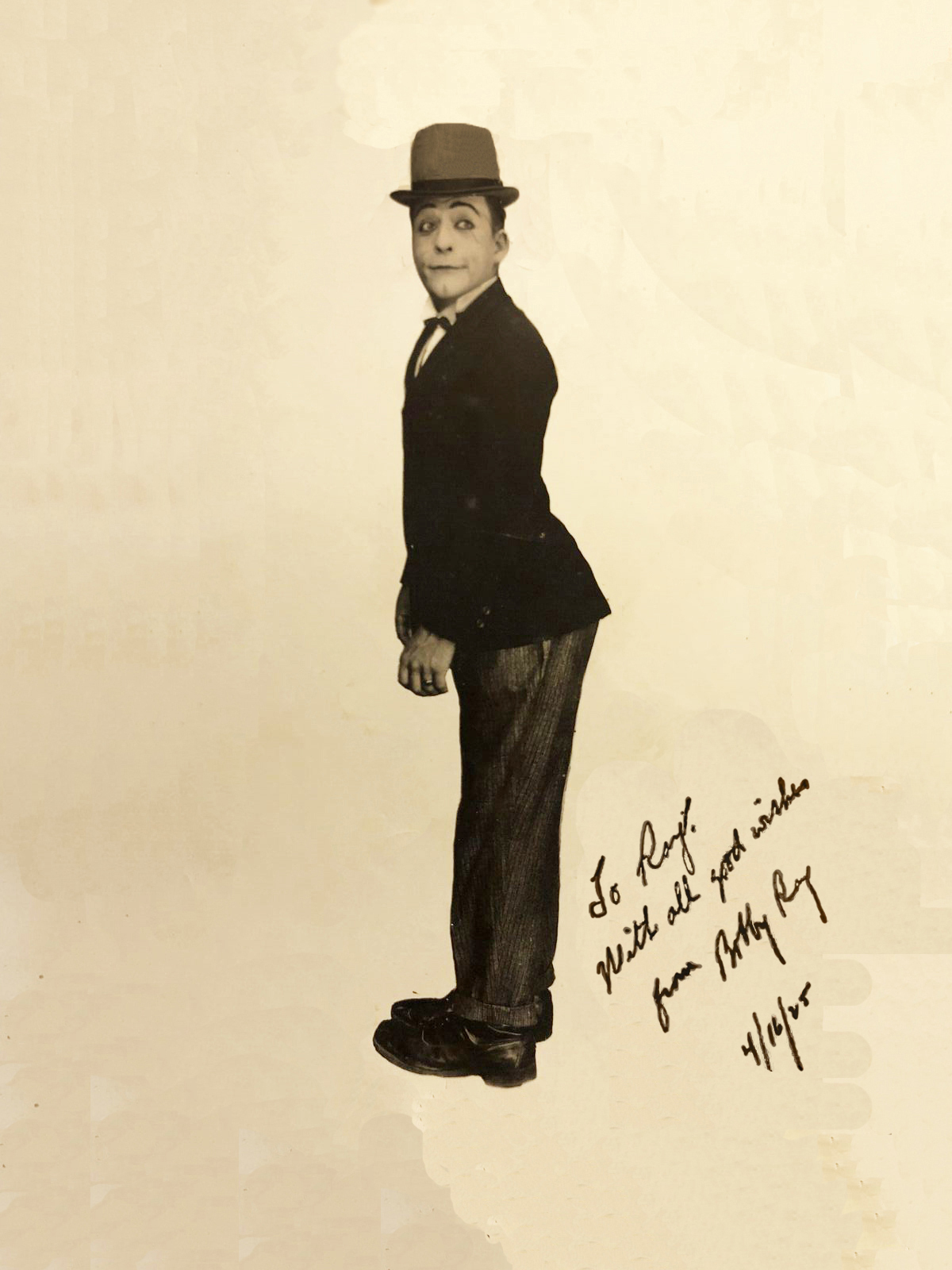
- Ray in 1925
- Born: Wilhelm Robert McBain Fuehrer; October 6, 1899; New York City, U.S.
- Died: March 26, 1957 (aged 57); Los Angeles, California, U.S.
- Occupations: Actor; director
- Years active: 1914–1956
- Spouse: Doris Storck (m. 1920)

Bobby Ray (born Wilhelm Robert McBain Fuehrer, October 6, 1899 – March 26, 1957) was an American film comedian of the silent era. He appeared in more than sixty short films between 1914 and 1927, including a group from the mid-1920s featuring Oliver Hardy. He was originally a child actor. In addition he directed six short films and two feature films Riley of the Rainbow Division and Dugan of the Dugouts (both 1928). Following the arrival of sound, Ray developed a new career as an assistant director that continued into the 1950s. Much of his work during this period was for the low-budget studio Monogram Pictures, but he later moved into television.

== Selected filmography ==
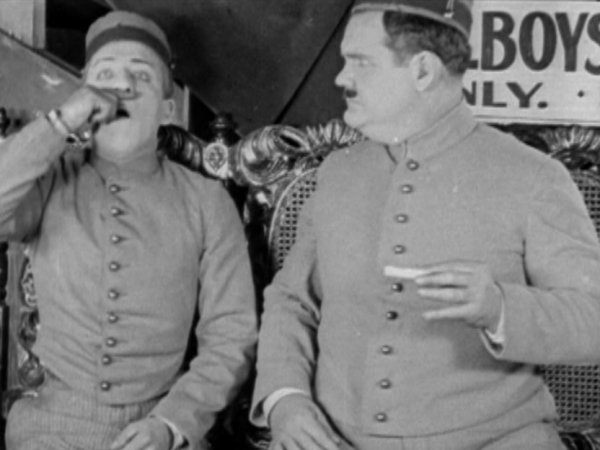
Ray with Oliver Hardy in Hop to It! (1925)

- Hop to It! (1925)
- Stick Around (1925)
- Hey, Taxi! (1925)
- They All Fall (1925)
- Riley of the Rainbow Division (1928)
- Dugan of the Dugouts (1928)

== Bibliography ==
- Munden, Kenneth White. The American Film Institute Catalog of Motion Pictures Produced in the United States, Part 1. University of California Press, 1997.
- Roots, James. The 100 Greatest Silent Film Comedians. Rowman & Littlefield, 2014.
