= The College Hero =

1927 film

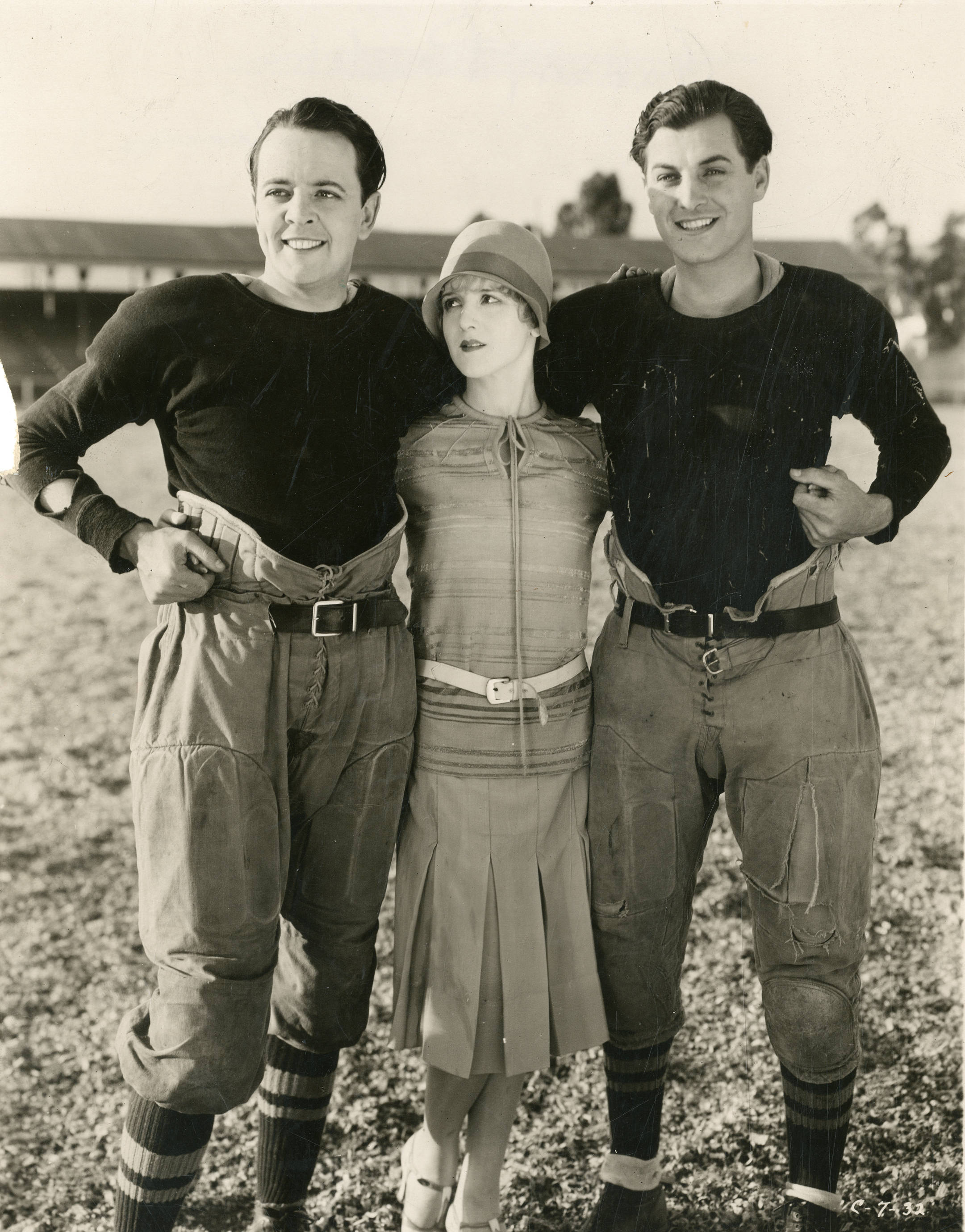
- Directed by: Walter Lang
- Written by: Dorothy Howell
- Produced by: Harry Cohn
- Starring: Pauline Garon; Rex Lease
- Cinematography: Joseph Walker
- Edited by: Arthur Roberts
- Distributed by: Columbia Pictures
- Release date: October 29, 1927
- Running time: 54 minutes
- Country: United States
- Language: Silent (English intertitles)

The College Hero is a 1927 American silent comedy film directed by Walter Lang. This is a surviving title contrary to some reports, as it is on YouTube.

== Plot ==
Football player Bob Cantfield enrolls at Carver College, is assigned Jim Halloran as a roommate and lands a date with Sampson Saunders' attractive sister, Vivian.

Jim's jealousy over Bob's gridiron and girlfriend successes cause him to trip his teammate deliberately and cause Bob to be injured in a game. Bob is still able to score the touchdown that wins Carver the game, after which Jim's conscience gets the better of him.

== Cast ==
- Pauline Garon as Vivian Saunders
- Ben Turpin as The Janitor
- Robert Agnew as Bob Cantfield (credited as Bobbie Agnew)
- Rex Lease as Jim Halloran
- Churchill Ross as Sampson Saunders
- Joan Standing as Nellie Kelly
- Charles Paddock as The Coach

== See also ==
- List of American football films
