= Gaylyn Studlar =

American critic and academic (1952–2026)

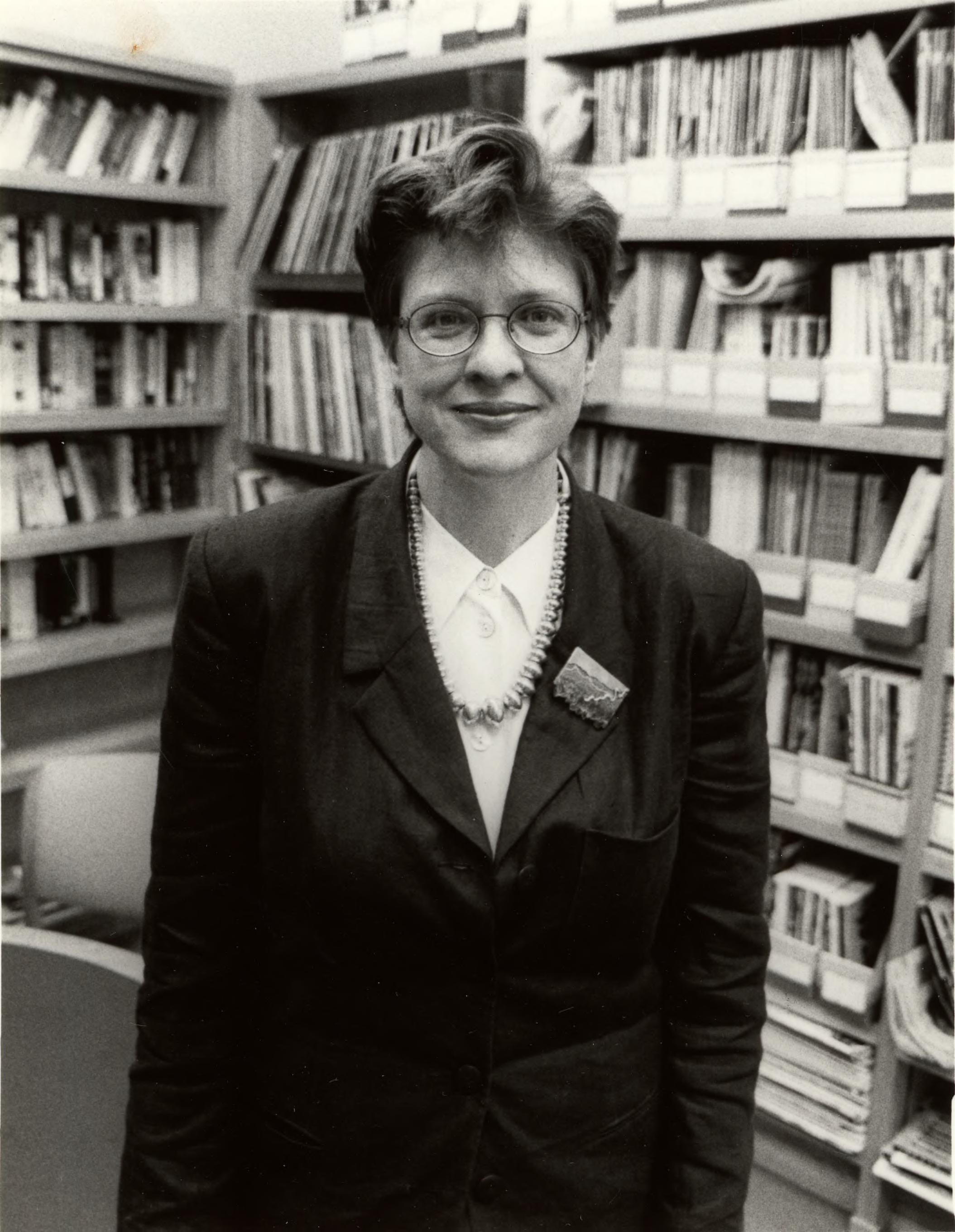
Studlar in 2001

Gaylyn Studlar (October 20, 1952 – September 9, 2026) was an American feminist, and film and media critic. She was David May Distinguished University Professor in the Humanities and director of the program in film and media studies at Washington University in St. Louis.

== Life and career ==
Studlar gained a BA in music at Texas Tech University, and a MA in music at the University of Southern California. She gained her PhD from USC in 1984.

After receiving her PhD, Studlar taught for three years at the University of North Texas and eight years at Emory University. In 1995, she became professor of women's studies and director of the program in film and video studies at the University of Michigan. In 2000, she was appointed Rudolph Arnheim Collegiate Professor of Film Studies at the University of Michigan.

In January 2009, Studlar moved to Arts and Sciences at Washington University in St. Louis.

Studlar died on September 9, 2026, at the age of 73.

== Works ==
- In the realm of pleasure: Von Sternberg, Dietrich, and the masochistic aesthetic,. Urbana, Illinois: University of Illinois, 1988.
- (ed. with David Desser) Reflections in a Male Eye: John Huston and the American Experience. Washington, DC: Smithsonian Institution Press, 1993.
- Visions of the East. 1996.
- This Mad Masquerade: Stardom and Masculinity in the Jazz Age. New York, 1996.
- (ed. with Matthew Bernstein) Visions of the East: Orientalism in Film. New Brunswick, NJ: Rutgers University Press, 1997.
- (ed. with Kevin S. Sandler) Titanic: Anatomy of a Blockbuster. New Brunswick, NJ: Rutgers University Press, 1999.
- (ed. with Matthew Bernstein) John Ford Made Westerns: Filming the Legend in the Sound Era. Bloomington, IN: Indiana University Press, 2001.
- Precocious Charms: Stars Performing Girlhood in Classical Hollywood Cinema. University of California Press, 2013.
- Have Gun — Will Travel. Wayne State University Press, 2015.
