= Streater =

Streater is a surname of English origin, a variant of Streeter, which is a habitational surname referring to someone who lived on the main street of a village or town, or someone who came from the village of Streat, East Sussex. Notable people with the surname include:

- Eric Streater (born 1964), American football player
- Jimmy Streater (1957–2004), Canadian football player
- John Streater (died 1687), English soldier, political writer and printer
- Ray Streater (born 1936), British physicist and professor
- Robert Streater (1621–1679), English painter and etcher
- Rod Streater (born 1988), American football player
