= Robert Streeter =

Robert Streeter or Streater may refer to:

- Robert Streater (1621–1679), English artist, also spelt Robert Streeter
- Robert Streater (martyr) (died 1556), executed for heresy
- Robert E. Streeter (1916–2002), American academic

== See also ==
- Robert Street (1920–2013), British academic
- Rob Street, English footballer
