= Streeter (surname) =

Streeter is a surname. Notable people with the surname include:

- Adams Streeter, American Universalist pastor
- Alan Streeter, Australian football player
- Alison Streeter, British cross-Channel swimmer
- Alson Streeter, American politician
- Anne Streeter (1926–2023), American politician
- Bess Streeter Aldrich, American novelist, author of Spring Came on Forever and other "pioneer novels"
- Brandon Streeter (born 1977), American football player and coach
- Burnett Hillman Streeter, British biblical scholar
- Charlie Streeter, Australian football player
- Daniel Willard Streeter, American hunter and author
- Edward Streeter (1891–1976), American novelist, wrote Father of the Bride
- Floyd Benjamin Streeter, American historian
- Gary Streeter (born 1955), British conservative politician
- George Streeter (c. 1837–1921), American criminal, Chicago squatter on a grounded riverboat for over 30 years
- Jeff Streeter (born 1979), American racing driver, former NASCAR
- Catherine A. Streeter (1873–1950), American insurance businesswoman; contract bridge expert
- Lilian Carpenter Streeter (1854–1936), American social reformer, clubwoman, author
- Penny Streeter (born 1967) British businesswoman, managing director of a UK recruitment agency
- R. E. Streeter, American, a founder of the Pastoral Bible Institute
- Robert E. Streeter, American academic administrator
- Rosine Streeter, trade unionist from New Caledonia
- Ruth Cheney Streeter (1895–1990), American military officer, first director of the U.S. Marine Corps Women's Reserve, first female Major in the U.S.M.C.
- Ryan Streeter, American public policy entrepreneur
- Sebastian F. Streeter (1810–1864), American school founder, educator, historian, lawyer
- Sevyn Streeter, American singer–songwriter
- Suzie Streeter, American missing person since 1992
- Tanya Streeter, Caymanian free-diver
- Thomas Winthrop Streeter Sr. (1883–1965), American book collector
- Tommy Streeter (born 1989), American football player
