= Born to Battle =

Born to Battle may refer to:

- Born to Battle (1935 film), an American film directed by Harry S. Webb starring Tom Tyler as "Cyclone" Tom Saunders
- Born to Battle (1926 film), an American film directed by Robert De Lacey starring Tom Tyler as Dennis Terhune
- Born to Battle (1927 film), an American film directed by Alan James starring Bill Cody as Billy Cowan
