= LeRoy Mason =

American actor (1903–1947)

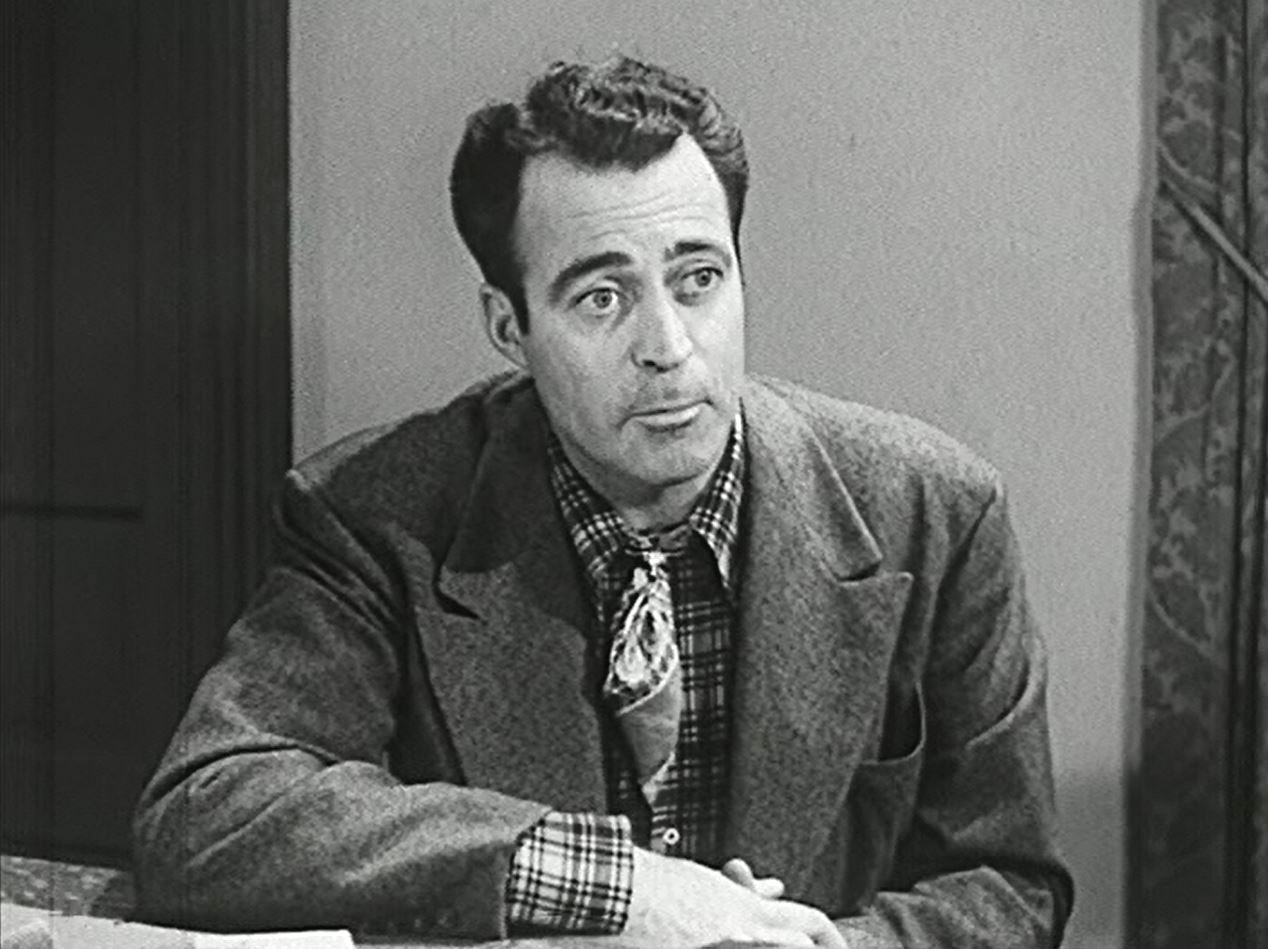
- Mason in Western Mail (1942)
- Born: LeRoy Franklin Mason; July 2, 1903; Larimore, North Dakota, U.S.
- Died: October 13, 1947 (aged 44); Van Nuys, California, U.S.
- Occupation: Actor
- Years active: 1924–1947
- Spouse(s): Rita Carewe (m. 1928; div. 1936) Bo Ling (m. 1937–his death)

LeRoy Franklin Mason (July 2, 1903 – October 13, 1947) was an American film actor who worked primarily in Westerns in both the silent and sound film eras. Mason was born in Larimore, North Dakota, on July 2, 1903.

== Career ==
=== 1920s ===
Mason's first film was Hit and Run opposite Hoot Gibson (1924). He was officially credited in Born to Battle (1926) opposite Tom Tyler and Jean Arthur. In 1926, Mason starred in The Arizona Streak opposite Tom Tyler, Frankie Darro, and Ada Mae Vaughn. Also in 1926, he starred in Lightning Hutch opposite Charles Hutchison and Edith Thornton. Mason starred opposite Tom Tyler, Doris Hill, and Frankie Darro in Tom and His Pals (1926). He starred opposite William Fairbanks, Alice Calhoun, and Frank Rice in Flying High (1926). He starred in Closed Gates (1928) opposite John Harron, Jane Novak, and Lucy Beaumont. Mason starred in Golden Shackles (1928) opposite Grant Withers and Priscilla Bonner. He starred in The Avenging Shadow (1928) opposite Margaret Morris. Mason starred in The Law's Lash (1928) opposite Robert Ellis and Mary Mayberry. He starred in Hit of the Show (1928), originally a silent film, opposite Joe E. Brown, Gertrude Olmstead, and William Bailey. Mason starred in Revenge (1928) Dolores del Río, James A. Marcus, and Rita Carewe. He starred in The Viking (1928) opposite Pauline Starke and Donald Crisp. Mason starred in Bride of the Desert (1929) opposite Alice Calhoun and Ethan Laidlaw. He starred in The Woman Who Was Forgotten (1930) opposite Belle Bennett and Jack Mower.

=== 1930s ===
Mason starred opposite of Lon Chaney Jr. in The Last Frontier (1932). He starred opposite Ray "Crash" Corrigan in The Painted Stallion (1937). Mason starred opposite John Wayne in Wyoming Outlaw (1939) and New Frontier (1939).

=== 1940s ===
Mason starred opposite David Sharpe in Silver Stallion (1941). He starred opposite Wild Bill Elliott in Hidden Valley Outlaws (1944). In the film, Mason and John James sings the song Oh Susanna.

== Personal life and death ==
Mason married Rita Carewe in 1928 and divorced her in 1936. He was married to actress Bo Ling; they had no children and eventually separated. A shooting accident on a film set in the 1930s caused him to lose sight in his right eye.

On October 13, 1947, Mason died of "acute myocardial infarction due to coronary thrombosis" in the Birmingham Veterans Administration Hospital in Van Nuys, California. He had been there for 31 days after suffering a heart attack on the set of California Firebrand. An Associated Press news story published October 14, 1947, says that Mason "collapsed on a Republic Studio set Monday and died a few hours later of a heart ailment."

== Filmography ==
=== Film ===
Year	Title	Role	Director (s)	Notes
1924	Hit and Run	Spectator	Edward Sedgwick	Silent comedy drama film; Uncredited
1926	Born to Battle	Daley	Robert De Lacey	Silent western film
1926	The Arizona Streak	Velvet Hamilton	Robert De Lacey	Silent western film
1926	Lightning Hutch	Frank Proctor	Charles Hutchison	Silent action film
1926	Tom and His Pals	Courtney	Robert De Lacey	Silent western film
1926	Flying High	Lester Swope	Charles Hutchison	Silent action film
1927	Closed Gates	Harvey Newell	Phil Rosen	Silent melodrama film
1928	Golden Shackles	Herbert Fordyce	Dallas M. Fitzgerald	Silent drama film
1928	The Avenging Shadow	George Brooks, Deputy Warden	Ray Taylor	Silent action film
1928	The Law's Lash	Pete Rogan - Henchman	Noel M. Smith	Silent action film
1928	Hit of the Show	Woody	Ralph Ince	Comedy film; Originally a silent film
1928	Revenge	Jorga	Edwin Carewe	Silent drama film
1928	The Viking	Alwin	Roy William Neill	First feature film to use Technicolor's dye-transfer process; Loosely based on the 1902 novel The Thrall of Leif the Lucky by Ottilie A. Liljencrantz.
1929	Bride of the Desert	Fugitive	Duke Worne	Western film
1930	The Woman Who Was Forgotten	Richard Atwell	Richard Thomas	Drama film; Based on the short story of the same name
1930	The Climax	Dr. Gardoni	Renaud Hoffman	Thriller film
1930	See America Thirst	Attorney	William James Craft	
1932	Texas Pioneers	Mark Collins	Harry L. Fraser	
1932	Shopworn	Toby	Nick Grinde	
1932	Mason of the Mounted	Calhoun	Harry Fraser	
1932	Merrily We Go to Hell	Party Guest	Dorothy Arzner	Uncredited
1932	The Last Frontier	Buck	Spencer Gordon Bennet	Serial
1933	The Monkey's Paw	Afghan	Wesley Ruggles	Uncredited
1933	Luxury Liner	Ship Passenger at Bar	Lothar Mendes	Uncredited
1933	King Kong	New York Theatergoer	Merian C. Cooper and Ernest B. Schoedsack	Uncredited
1933	The Phantom of the Air	Mortimer Crome	Ray Taylor	Serial
1933	Life in the Raw	Lamson's Henchman	Louis King	Uncredited
1933	The Last Trail	Withers, Henchman	James Tinling	Uncredited
1933	I Loved a Woman	Martha's Coachman	Alfred E. Green	Uncredited
1933	Smoky	Lefty	Eugene Forde	
1933	Maizie	Paul Barnes	Dallas M. Fitzgerald	
1934	Are We Civilized?	Paul Franklin Jr.	Edwin Carewe	
1934	The Dude Ranger	Dale Hyslip	Edward F. Cline	
1934	Redhead	Pretty Boy	Melville W. Brown	
1934	The Fighting Trooper	Andre La Farge	Ray Taylor	
1934	When a Man Sees Red	Dick Brady	Alan James	
1935	Texas Terror	Joe Dickson	Robert N. Bradbury	With John Wayne
1935	Northern Frontier	Stone	Sam Newfield	
1935	The Mystery Man	The Eel, Gangster	Ray McCarey	
1935	Rainbow Valley	Rogers	Robert N. Bradbury	With John Wayne
1935	Men of Action	Jim Denton - Construction Engineer	Alan James	
1935	Call of the Wild	Pimp in Mary's Room	William A. Wellman	Uncredited
1935	Valley of Wanted Men	Larry Doyle	Alan James	
1936	Black Gold	Henry 'Hank' Langford	Russell Hopton	
1936	Comin' Round the Mountain	Matt Ford	Mack V. Wright	
1936	Go-Get-'Em, Haines	Tony Marchetti	Sam Newfield	
1936	The Border Patrolman	Courtney Maybrook	David Howard	
1936	Ghost-Town Gold	Dirk Barrington	Joseph Kane	
1936	Fury Below	Fred Johnson	Harry Fraser	

The following were with John Wayne:

- Maker of Men (1931)
- California Straight Ahead! (1937)
- Santa Fe Stampede (1938)
- Wyoming Outlaw (1939)
- New Frontier (1939)

Other films:

- It Happened Out West (1937)
- Jungle Menace (1937)
- Heroes of the Hills (1938)
- Topa Topa (1938)
- The Painted Trail (1938)
- Saved By The Belle (1939) Columbia short w/The Three Stooges
- The Range Busters (1940)
- Rocky Mountain Rangers (1940)
- Triple Justice (1940)
- Across the Sierras (1941)
- Silver Stallion (1941)
- Chetniks! The Fighting Guerrillas (1943)
- Raiders of Sunset Pass (1943)
- Lucky Cowboy (1944)
- The Tiger Woman (1944)
- San Fernando Valley (1944)
