= Sheldonian Theatre =

Theatre in Oxford, England

- South façade of the Sheldonian Theatre

- Location of the Sheldonian Theatre in Oxford
- 51.7543°N 1.2550°W
- Location: Broad Street, Oxford; OX1 3AZ; United Kingdom

History
- Built: 1664–1669; 357 years ago

Site notes
- Architect: Christopher Wren
- Architectural style: English Baroque
- Owner: University of Oxford

Listed Building – Grade I
- Official name: The Sheldonian Theatre
- Designated: 12 January 1954
- Reference no.: 1047350

The Sheldonian Theatre, in the centre of Oxford, England, was built from 1664 to 1669 after a design by Christopher Wren for the University of Oxford. The building is named after Gilbert Sheldon, Warden of All Souls College and later chancellor of the university. Sheldon was the project's main financial backer. The theatre is used for music concerts, lectures and university ceremonies, but was not used for drama until 2015 when the Christ Church Dramatic Society staged a production of The Crucible by Arthur Miller.

== History ==
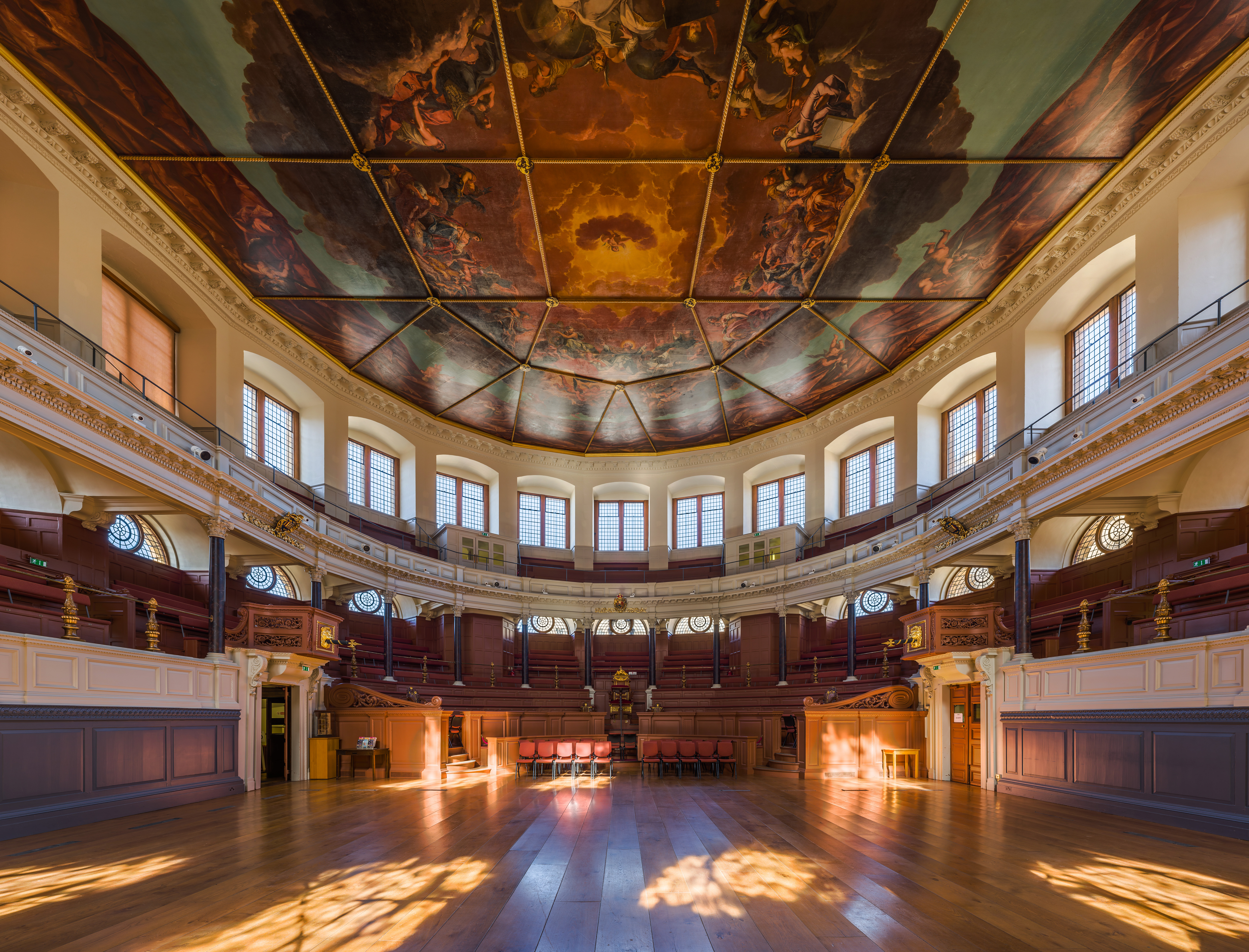
Interior of the theatre

What came to be known as the Sheldonian Theatre was Wren's second work and was commissioned by Gilbert Sheldon, Archbishop of Canterbury. With the triumph of the Restoration and with it the Church of England, Dean Fell, vice-chancellor of the university, sought to revive a project proposed in the 1630s by the late William Laud, Archbishop of Canterbury: a separate building whose sole use would be graduation and degree ceremonies.

In the past these increasingly rowdy occasions had taken place in the University Church of St Mary the Virgin, in the High Street. "The notion that 'sacrifice is made equally to God and Apollo', in the same place where homage was due to God and God alone, was as repugnant to Fell and his colleagues as it had been to Laud"; with this in mind they approached the Archbishop of Canterbury Gilbert Sheldon, for his blessing, his assistance, and a donation.

Sheldon was forthcoming with all three. He initially gave an impressive £1,000 (£177,431 today) and pledged to gather the needed money from like-minded sponsors. He had little luck, however, and ultimately financed nearly the entire £14,470 (£2,567,424 today) himself, in an age where a mid-level craftsman's wage was typically between £2 and £4 per year.

Wren's initial designs for the Sheldonian probably included a proscenium stage that did not survive his revisions. The building that was constructed was a sharp, unmistakable break from the Gothic past. According to Wren's son, Wren designed the Sheldonian based on Serlio's sixteenth-century engraving of the D-shaped Theatre of Marcellus erected in Rome in the first century BC.

Like any Mediterranean theatre of that time, the Theatre of Marcellus had no roof: the audience relied on a temporary awning for inclement weather. But 17th century Oxford was not ancient Rome, and the Theatre needed a permanent roof. The span of the D-shaped roof was over 70 feet (21 m). However, no timbers existed that were long enough to cross that distance, and Wren dismissed the obvious solution of a Gothic roof. Instead, he decided to use the "geometrical flat floor" grid developed twenty years before by Oxford professor John Wallis.

It involved

... creating a series of trusses which were built up from shorter section[s] and held in place by their own weight, with help from judiciously placed iron bolts and plates ... [S]o effective [was the roof] that for nearly a century the University Press stored its books ... and for many years it was the largest unsupported floor in existence ...

In 1720, surveyors inspecting the roof, following a rumour that it was no longer safe, were both surprised and impressed at what they discovered. Though sagging slightly from the massive weight of books, the inspectors pronounced that "... the whole Fabrick of the said Theatre is, in our Opinion, like[ly] to remain and continue in such Repair and Condition, for one hundred or two hundred Years yet to come."

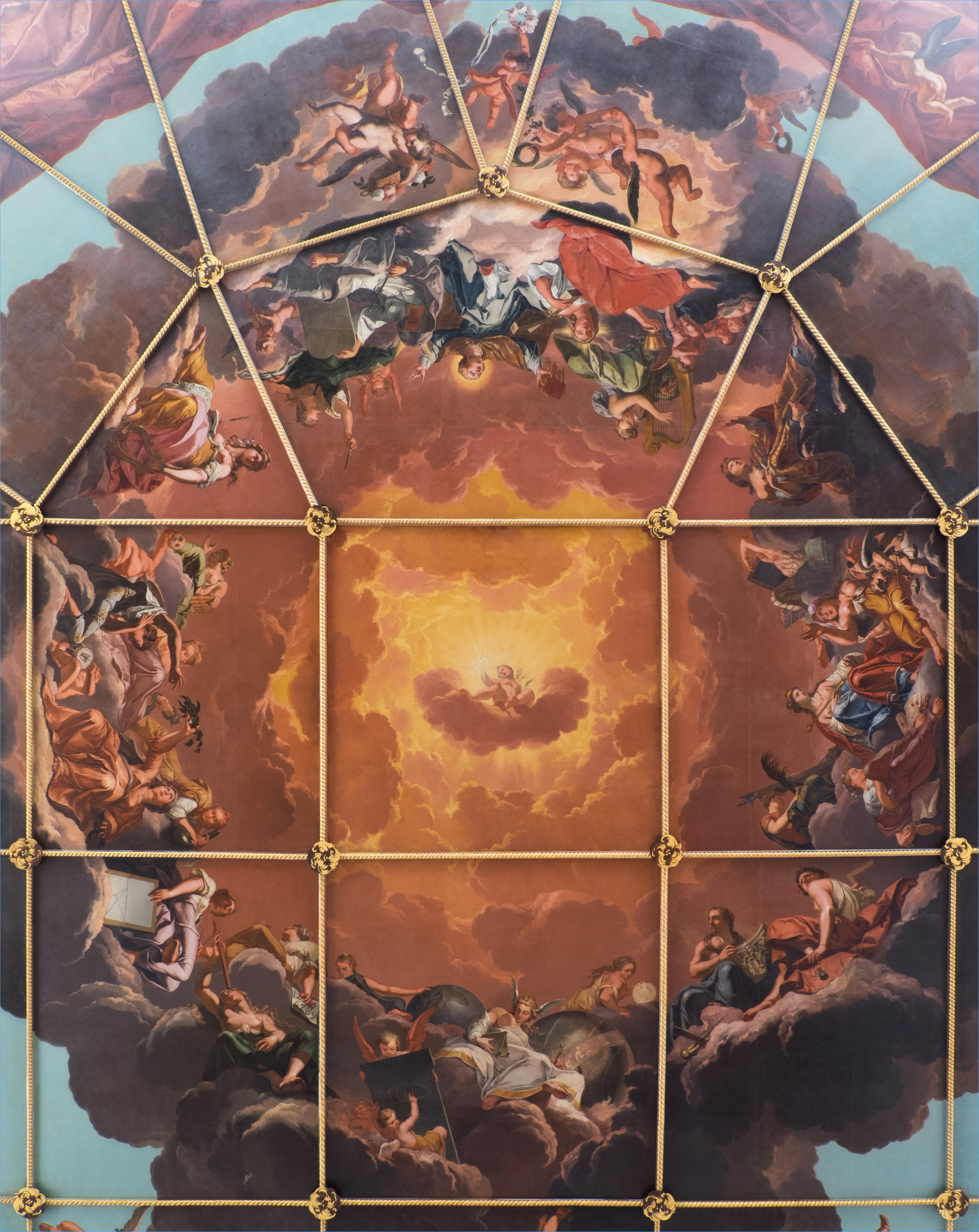
Ceiling fresco painted by Robert Streater

In November 2008 a four-year project to restore the ceiling fresco was completed. The thirty-two oil on canvas panels originally painted by King Charles II’s court painter, Robert Streater, were removed and conserved. As part of the conservation process, the panels had their linings replaced, holes in the canvas mended, and over-painting removed. The allegorical story depicted in the paintings shows Truth descending upon the Arts and Sciences and expelling ignorance from the university.

In May 2024, during the Gaza war protests in the United Kingdom, the Sheldonian Theatre played centre stage for Oxford University students, who listed their Gaza demands there, in reaction to civilian deaths. Protesters later blocked the path of graduation ceremonies taking place at the theatre.

== Building ==
The building has a prominent eight-sided cupola in the centre of the roof, which is accessible via a staircase leading to the dome over the main ceiling. The cupola has large windows on all sides, providing views across central Oxford, and is open to visitors.

The theatre is used for music recitals, lectures (such as the annual Romanes Lecture), conferences, and for various ceremonies held by the University (such as graduation and matriculation). Handel conducted the first performance of his third oratorio Athalia here in 1733. Today, the theatre is home to regular performances by local groups, including the Oxford Philomusica and Stornoway. The latter was the first pop band to play in the space, joined by the student-led Oxford Millennium Orchestra for its first single launch in 2009, then again to celebrate the launch of its third LP, in 2014.

The building seats up to 700 people and is on the grounds of part of the Bodleian Library adjacent to Broad Street. To the left at the front is the Clarendon Building and to the right is the Old Ashmolean Building. Behind the Sheldonian is the Divinity School.

The theatre is a Grade I listed building which was first added to the list on 12 January 1954.

The theatre features prominently in Max Beerbohm's 1911 novel Zuleika Dobson and was used as stand in for Harvard in the 1980 film Heaven's Gate.

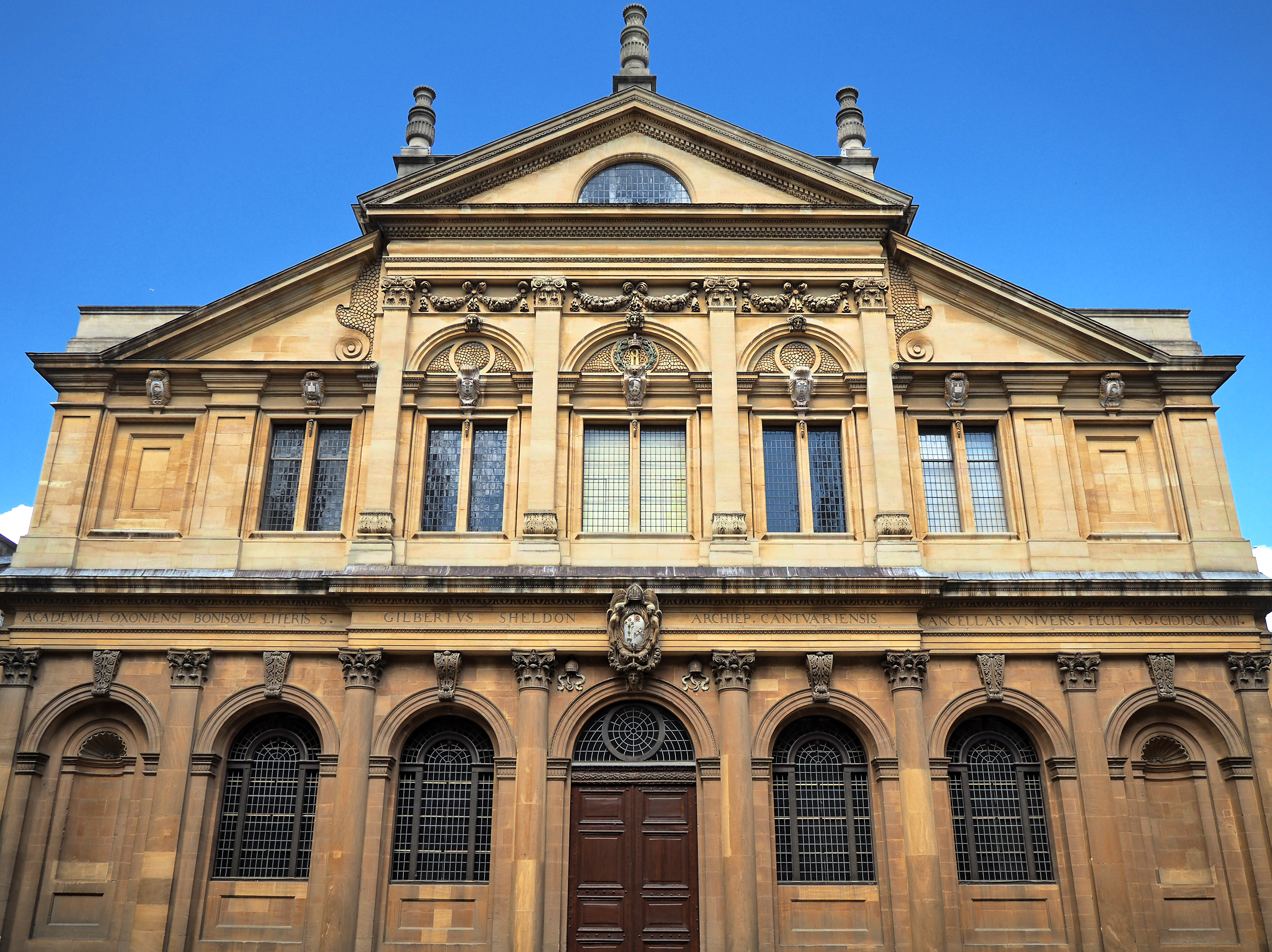
South façade

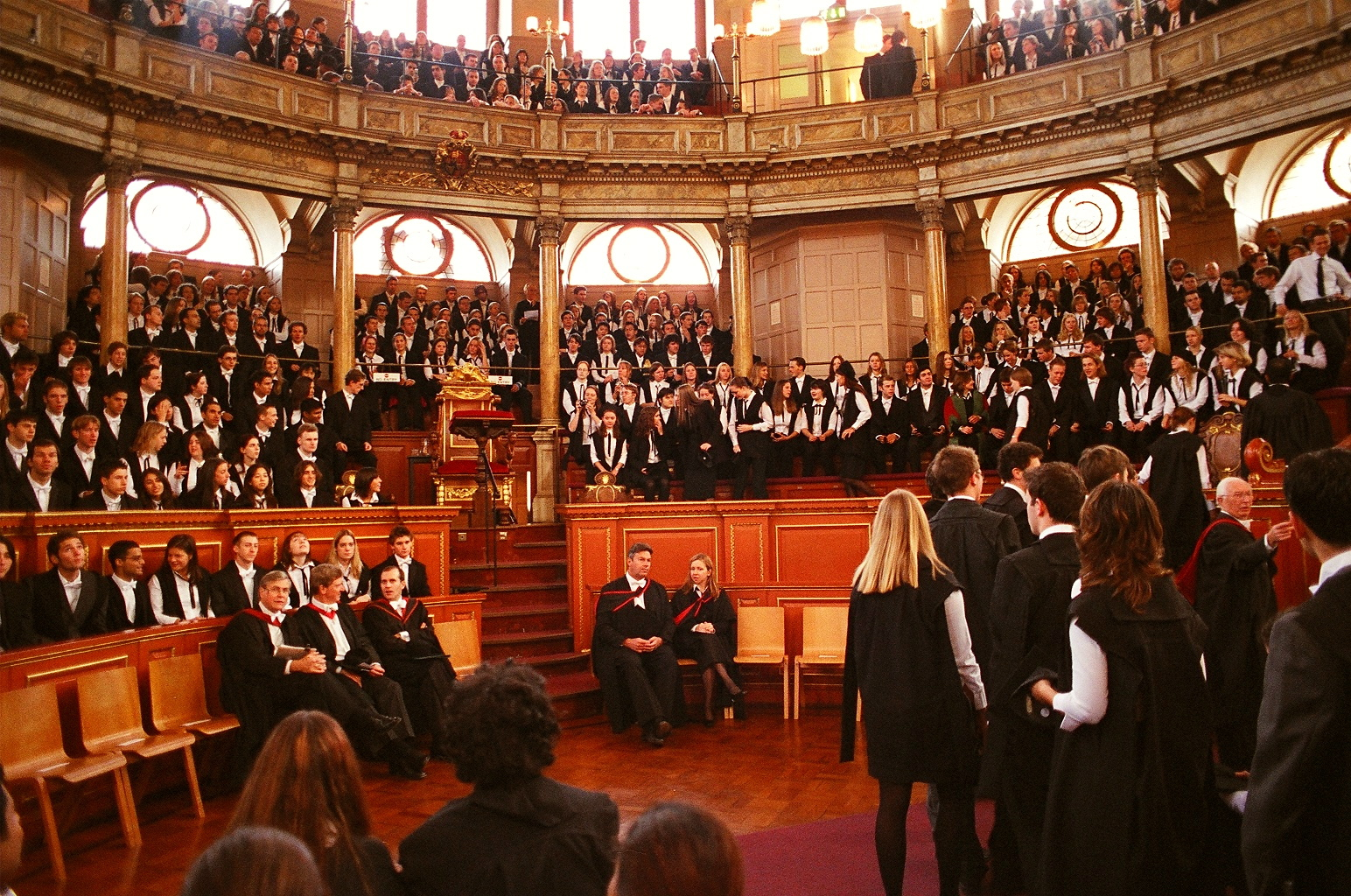
Interior prior to a matriculation ceremony, 2003

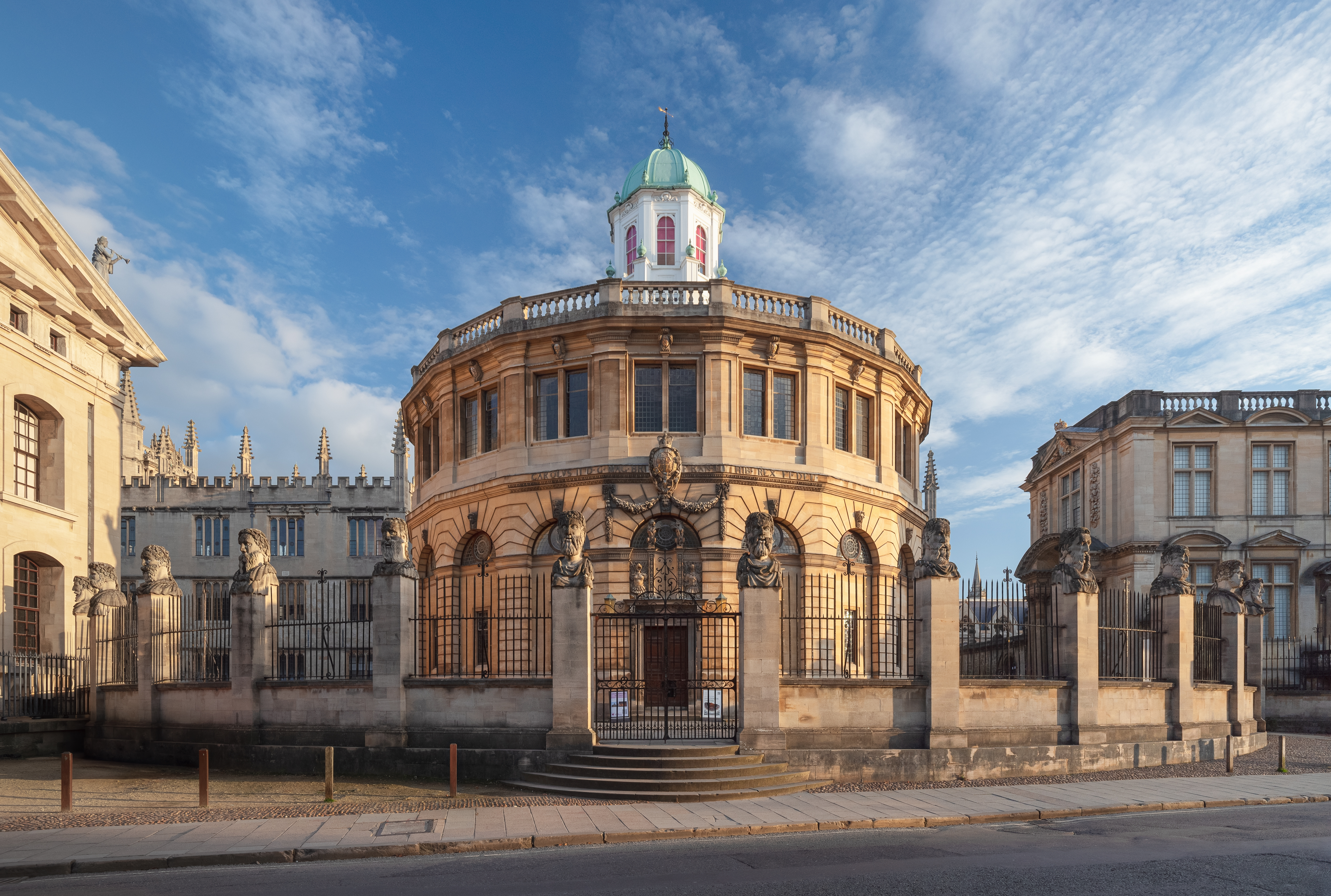
North façade from Broad Street

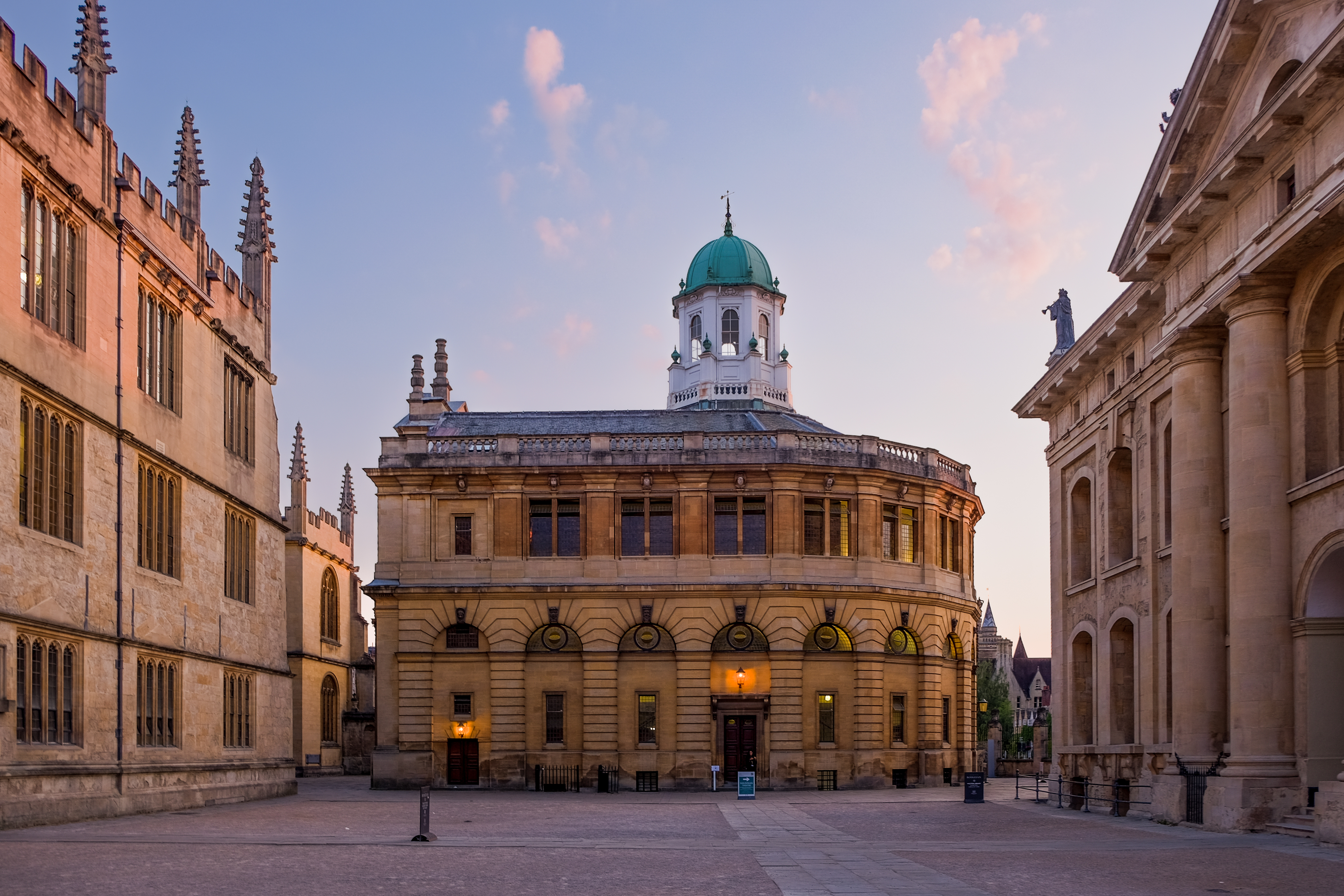
View from the east, behind the Clarendon Building

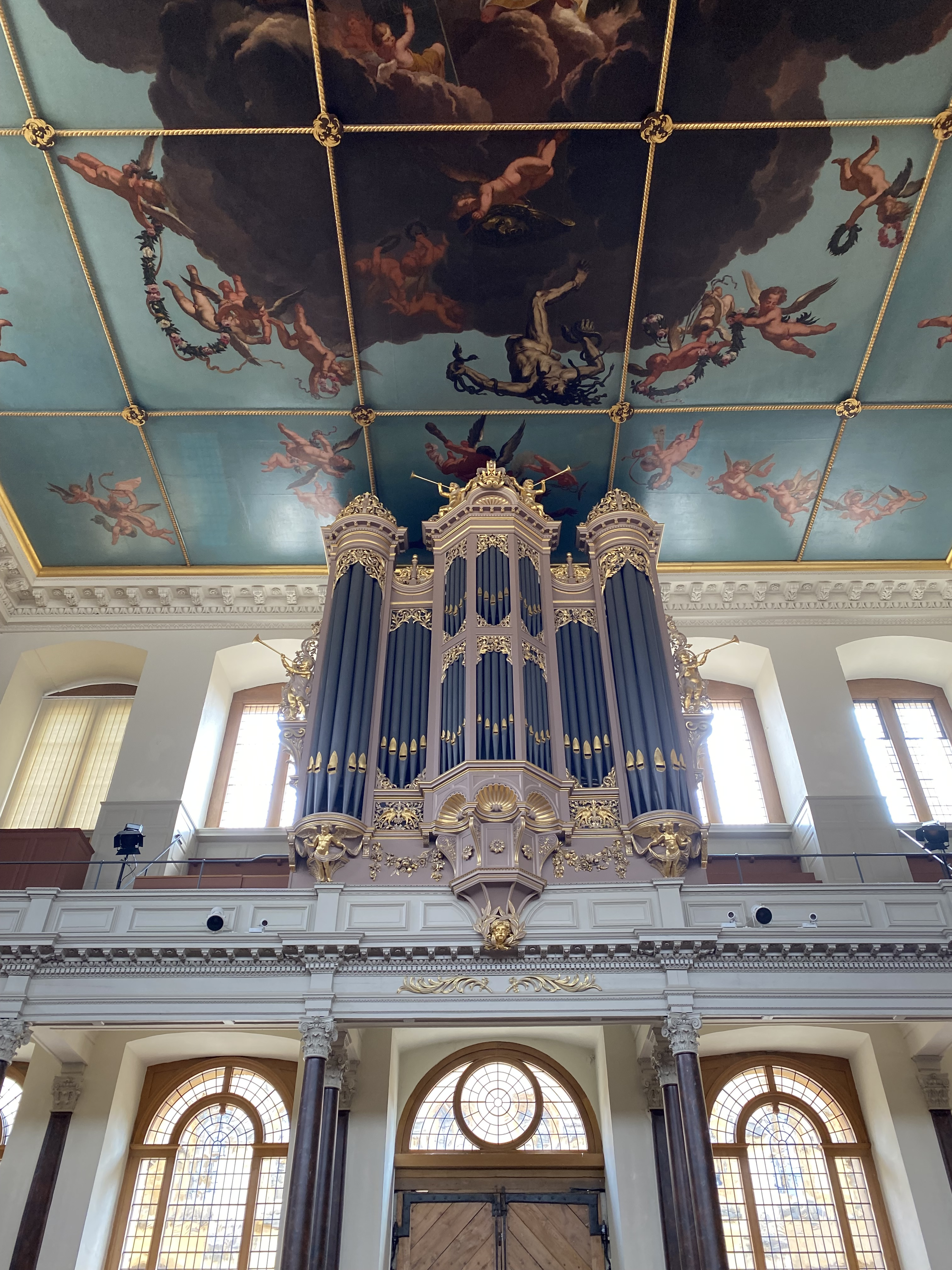
View of the pipe organ inside the Sheldonian Theatre, designed by Sir T.G. Jackson in 1876

== See also ==
- Holywell Music Room
- Oxford Bach Choir
- Oxford University Big Band
- Oxford Philomusica
- Stornoway (band)
