= Closed Gates =

1927 film

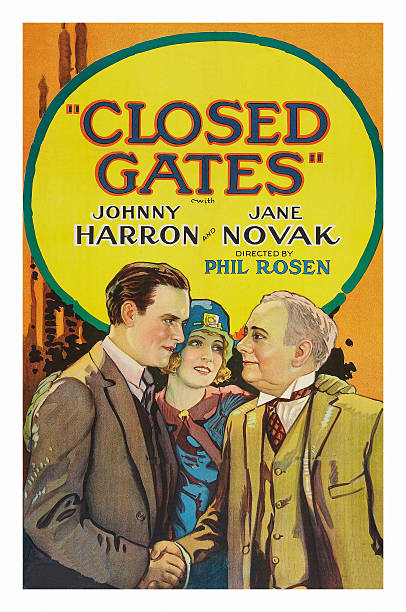
- Poster for the film
- Directed by: Phil Rosen
- Screenplay by: Frances Guihan
- Based on: a story by Manfred Lee
- Starring: John Harron; Jane Novak; Lucy Beaumont
- Cinematography: Herbert Kirkpatrick
- Production company: Sterling Productions
- Release date: June 1, 1927 (US)
- Running time: 65 minutes
- Country: United States
- Language: Silent (English intertitles)

Closed Gates is a 1927 American silent melodrama film based on a story by Manfred Lee and directed by Phil Rosen. It stars John Harron, Jane Novak, and Lucy Beaumont, and was released on June 1, 1927.

== Cast list ==
- John Harron as George Newell Jr.
- Jane Novak as Alice Winston
- Lucy Beaumont as Mary Newell
- Sidney De Grey as George Newell, Sr.
- LeRoy Mason as Harvey Newell
- Rosemary Cooper as Martha Roberts
- Ruth Handforth as Bridget
- Bud Jamison as Pat

== Plot ==
George Newell Jr. is the son of wealthy parents. In the days leading up to World War I, he disgraces himself and his family. In order to redeem himself, he enlists after the war breaks out. During battle he is injured and loses his memory. He is lovingly cared for by his nurse, with whom he falls in love. While at work, he collapses from exhaustion, and is taken to a sanitarium to recuperate. While there, his father and cousin, Harvey, see him, but do not reveal that they know him. However, the maid, Bridget learns of the younger Newell's plight and brings him back to the family home, where the sight of his mother's wheelchair jogs his memory, and he reconciles with his father.

== Preservation ==
A print of Closed Gates is held in the French archive Centre national du cinéma et de l'image animée in Fort de Bois-d'Arcy.

== Reception ==
At the time of the film's release, The New York Times published a mostly negative review with the only positive remarks reserved for Jane Novak: "Were it not for Miss Novak there would not be a bright spot in this production." Photoplay called it a "fair little yarn", but warned viewers not to "expect too much".
