= Bo Ching =

- Born: Bo Ching Park; April 21, 1911; Alameda County, California, USA
- Died: July 13, 1999 (aged 88); Los Angeles County, California, USA
- Other name: Winnie Park
- Education: Berkeley High School; University of California, Berkeley
- Spouse: William Tong (m. 1945)
- Family: Bo Ling (sister)

Bo Ching "Winnie" Park was an American actor active in Hollywood from the 1920s to the 1940s.

== Biography ==
Bo Ching was born in Alameda County, California, to Edward "E.L." Park and Oie "Florence" Chan. Her parents — born in the United States to Chinese immigrants — were actors; E.L. appeared as Charlie Chan in the 1929 film Behind that Curtain and later served as an interpreter for the county of Los Angeles, while Florence appeared in a number of films in the 1930s and 1940s. When the family relocated to Los Angeles in the late 1920s, E.L. and Florence opened a Chinese restaurant on Alameda Street and owned their own Chinese costume store.

After graduating from the University of California, Berkeley, Bo Ching and her older sister, Bo Ling, performed in Las Vegas and around the country as a vaudeville act before settling in Hollywood and getting work as actors in the film industry. Their contemporaneous publicity materials often claimed the pair were born in China and that they were twins, despite being born several years apart.

Bo Ching married William Tong — a Seabee with the U.S. Navy — in Los Angeles in 1945. The pair met at the Hollywood Guild Canteen a year earlier. Later on in Tong's life, she more or less retired from acting but worked as a tap-dancing teacher. She briefly came out of retirement for one role in the 1980s, appearing as Keiko's grandmother in an episode of Star Trek: The Next Generation.

== Select filmography ==
- Star Trek: The Next Generation (1987) (TV)
- First Yank Into Tokyo (1945)
- God Is My Co-Pilot (1945)
- The Amazing Mrs. Holliday (1943)
- Petticoat Fever (1936)
- International House (1933)
