= Bo Ling =

American actress

- Born: Bo Ling Park; November 15, 1908; Alameda County, California, USA
- Died: March 18, 1999 (aged 90); Granada Hills, California, USA
- Other names: Bernice Park, Bernice Mason
- Education: Berkeley High School
- Occupation: Actor
- Years active: 1928–1955
- Spouse: LeRoy Mason (m. 1937)
- Relatives: Bo Ching (sister)

Bo Ling "Bernice" Park was an American film actor who appeared in a number of films from the 1920s through the 1950s.

== Biography ==
Bo Ling was born in Alameda County, California, to Edward "E.L." Park and Oie "Florence" Chan. Both of her parents were actors and children of Chinese immigrants; E.L. appeared as Charlie Chan in the 1929 film Behind that Curtain and later served as an interpreter for the county of Los Angeles, while Florence appeared in a number of films in the 1930s and 1940s, including Charlie Chan films. When the family relocated to Los Angeles in the late 1920s, E.L. and Florence opened a Chinese restaurant on Alameda Street and owned their own Chinese costume store.

Bo Ling and her younger sister, Bo Ching "Winnie" Park, were encouraged by their parents to become entertainers, and the pair were sometimes referred to as "the Chinese twins" despite being born three years apart. The sisters performed in Las Vegas and around the country as a vaudeville act before settling in Hollywood and getting work as actors in the film industry. Their contemporaneous publicity materials often claimed the pair were born in China.

Bo's first known onscreen appearance was as a dancer in the 1928 film Red Wine. Throughout the 1920s and 1930s, she appeared in films and on Broadway.

She was the second wife of LeRoy Mason, an actor who appeared in many Westerns at Republic. The pair married in 1937; they separated at some point before his death in the 1940s, although they were still legally married. She appeared in very few films during their marriage, but returned to acting more regularly in the 1950s, appearing in Soldier of Fortune and The Left Hand of God, among others.

Sometime after the 1950s, Bo Ling retired from Hollywood. At her home in Northridge, she had her own ceramics kiln. She died in 1999 in Granada Hills.

== Selected filmography ==
- Soldier of Fortune (1955)
- The Left Hand of God (1955)
- The Bamboo Prison (1954)
- Gobs and Gals (1952)
- Call Me Mister (1951)
- God Is My Co-Pilot (1945)
- Calling Philo Vance (1940)
- Captured in Chinatown (1935)
- 365 Nights in Hollywood (1934)
- International House (1933)
- Red Wine (1928)
