= The Avenging Shadow =

1928 film

- Directed by: Ray Taylor
- Written by: Bennett Cohen
- Starring: Margaret Morris; LeRoy Mason
- Cinematography: Harry Cooper; David Smith
- Edited by: Tom Malloy
- Production company: Fred J. McConnell Productions
- Distributed by: Pathé Exchange
- Release date: April 29, 1928
- Running time: 50 minutes
- Country: United States
- Language: Silent (English intertitles)

The Avenging Shadow is a 1928 American silent action film directed by Ray Taylor and starring Margaret Morris and LeRoy Mason. It was designed as a vehicle for Klondike the Dog, an imitator of Rin Tin Tin.

== Cast ==
- Klondike the Dog as Klondike
- Ray Hallor as James Hamilton, Young Bank Clerk
- Wilbur Mack as Worthington, Assistant Cashier
- Clark Comstock as Sheriff Apling
- Howard Davies as The Warden
- Margaret Morris as Marie, The Warden's Daughter
- LeRoy Mason as George Brooks, Deputy Warden

== Sources ==
- Munden, Kenneth White. The American Film Institute Catalog of Motion Pictures Produced in the United States, Part 1. University of California Press, 1997.
