= The Viking (1928 film) =

1928 film by Roy William Neill

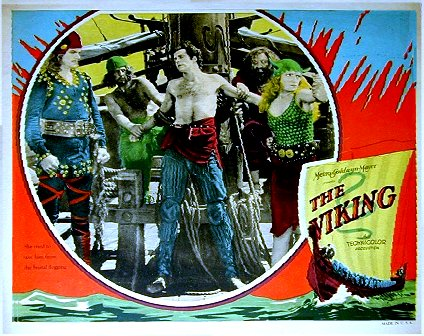
- Lobby card
- Directed by: Roy William Neill
- Written by: Randolph Bartlett (titles); Jack Cunningham
- Based on: The Thrall of Leif the Lucky; 1902 novel by Ottilie A. Liljencrantz
- Produced by: Herbert Kalmus
- Starring: Pauline Starke; Donald Crisp; LeRoy Mason
- Cinematography: George Cave
- Edited by: Aubrey Scotto
- Music by: William Axt (uncredited); Richard Wagner (uncredited); Edvard Grieg (uncredited)
- Color process: Technicolor
- Production company: Metro-Goldwyn-Mayer
- Distributed by: Loew's, Inc.
- Release date: November 2, 1928
- Running time: 90 minutes
- Country: United States
- Languages: Sound (Synchronized) (English Intertitles)

The Viking is a 1928 American synchronized sound drama film. While the film has no audible dialog, it was released with a synchronized musical score with sound effects using the sound-on-film Western Electric Sound System process. This film was the first feature-length Technicolor film that featured a soundtrack, and it was the first film made in Technicolor's Process 3. It stars Pauline Starke, Donald Crisp, and LeRoy Mason. The film is loosely based on the 1902 novel The Thrall of Leif the Lucky by Ottilie A. Liljencrantz. The Viking was directed by Roy William Neill.

== Plot ==
Lord Alwin, Earl of Northumbria, is captured in a Viking raid and taken to Norway as a slave. There he is bought by Helga, an "orphan of noble blood" under the guardianship of Leif Ericsson. He proves a troublesome slave, and Leif's sailing master, Egil the Black, prepares to kill him for his insolence, but Helga stops him. When Alwin challenges Egil to a sword fight, Leif is impressed by his courage and permits it. Alwin manages to break Egil's sword, but spares him. Helga then gives Alwin to Leif.

Leif, with the support of King Olaf, the first Christian king of Norway, sets out to search for lands beyond Greenland, which was discovered by his pagan father, Eric the Red. Back in Greenland, Eric kills one of his men after he discovers that the man is a Christian. When Leif stops there to pick up supplies, Eric gives his blessing for his marriage to Helga (unbeknownst to her). However, after it is revealed that Leif is himself a Christian, Eric disowns him and refuses to give him any supplies. Fighting breaks out after Leif instructs Alwin to take the supplies anyway. In the confusion, Helga stows away on Leif's ship.

Leif has no choice but to take her along. During the voyage, she and Alwin confess their love for each other. Unaware of this, Leif informs her that he will marry her on the "second change of the moon". Egil, in love with Helga himself, foments a mutiny among the crew, who fear sailing off the edge of the world. When Egil prepares to stab Leif in the back during the wedding ceremony, Alwin leaps in the way and is wounded. Leif kills Egil, but is enraged when Helga reveals that she loves Alwin. He raises his sword to kill the unconscious Alwin, but his Christian faith stops him. Just then, land is sighted, and the mutiny dissolves.

Leif steps ashore bearing a makeshift cross. He has a stone tower built and makes friends with the natives. When Leif leaves for home, Alwin, Helga and a few others remain behind. A final, 'modern day,' scene, with God Bless America sung in the background, states that the stone tower still stands in Newport, Rhode Island.

== Cast ==
- Donald Crisp as Leif Ericsson
- Pauline Starke as Helga [Nillson]
- LeRoy Mason as Alwin
- Anders Randolph as Eric the Red
- Richard Alexander as Sigurd
- Harry Lewis Woods as Egil
- Albert MacQuarrie as Kark
- Roy Stewart as King Olaf
- Torben Meyer as Odd
- Claire MacDowell as Lady Editha (credited as Claire MacDowell)
- Julia Swayne Gordon as Thorhild
- Iron Eyes Cody as Indian (uncredited)
- Frank Ellis as Man Who Gives Sword to Alwin (uncredited)
- Francis McDonald as Viking Friend of Leif (uncredited)
- Lon Poff as Friar Slain by Vikings (uncredited)
- Angelo Rossitto as Viking Dwarf (uncredited)
- Dick Sutherland as Viking (uncredited)

== Production ==
The Viking (1928)

The Viking was the first feature film to use Technicolor's dye-transfer process because of the technical limitation of the previous process with printing sound, which used two prints cemented base-to-base. The film was considered the finest use of color cinematography at the time of release.

=== Early sound and color technology ===
The sound was recorded in the Movietone sound-on-film system originally developed by Fox Film Corporation, with color by Technicolor in their new dye transfer process, now known as Process 3.

The film was produced by the Technicolor Corporation, but was distributed by Metro-Goldwyn-Mayer, after production chief Irving Thalberg became impressed with the technology. The film carries MGM's Leo the Lion logo in color, featuring a different lion (called Telly) than the one (Jackie) shown on black-and-white films. In 1930, MGM reissued the film as a color sound musical film titled The Private Life of Leif Ericson. The sound film survives today as well as the silent version.

== Reception ==
Film critic Mordaunt Hall of The New York Times wrote in his review: "although the figures often look as if they had stepped out of an opera comique, there is something compelling about The Viking. The make-up of the players is often more than a trifle overdone, especially when the villain reveals on close inspection his mouse-colored eyelids." He further opined that "the prismatic effects in this production may not always be the desired quality, especially when it concerns fire and water, but they are none the less agreeable."

Martin Dickstein, the critic for The Brooklyn Daily Eagle, said that while the film "may be called a fairly engaging pictorial entertainment, apparently this presentation is inclined to portray the exploits of its virile heroes somewhat more in the light of glamour and romance than with mere historical accuracy." He went on to say that "unfortunately, like the story, the acting in The Viking is almost as annoying as it is unbelievable, art, here, appears to suffer terribly in the stuffiness of blond wigs and titian beards."

Edwin Schallert wrote in the Los Angeles Times, "as a forerunner of the new development in color photography, The Viking will unquestionably arouse much interest." He complimented Pauline Starke and Donald Crisp for their acting, singling out Crisp who "especially gives a distinguished performance." He also noted that "Miss Starke, turned blonde for the nonce, is pictorially effective as the heroine." He concluded that "the picture may be somewhat lacking in the imaginative feeling that is suggested by the Viking period, but it intrigues the fancy with its romance and adventure."

In 1938, Technicolor president Herbert Kalmus wrote:

There seemed to be two principal troubles with The Viking, both of which I suspected but without certainty. First it came out among the very last silent pictures in 1929, and second, whiskers. Leif Ericson, the Viking hero true to character had a long curling mustache, whereas American audiences prefer their lovers smooth-shaven. At times the whole screen seemed filled with Viking whiskers.

Film historians Sheldon Hall and Steve Neale wrote in their book Epics, Spectacles, and Blockbusters: "The Viking was neither a talkie nor a musical," as the other two Technicolor films of "the late 1920s and early 1930s."

== See also ==
- List of early color feature films
- List of early sound feature films (1926–1929)
- List of films featuring slavery
