= Red Wine (1928 film) =

1928 film

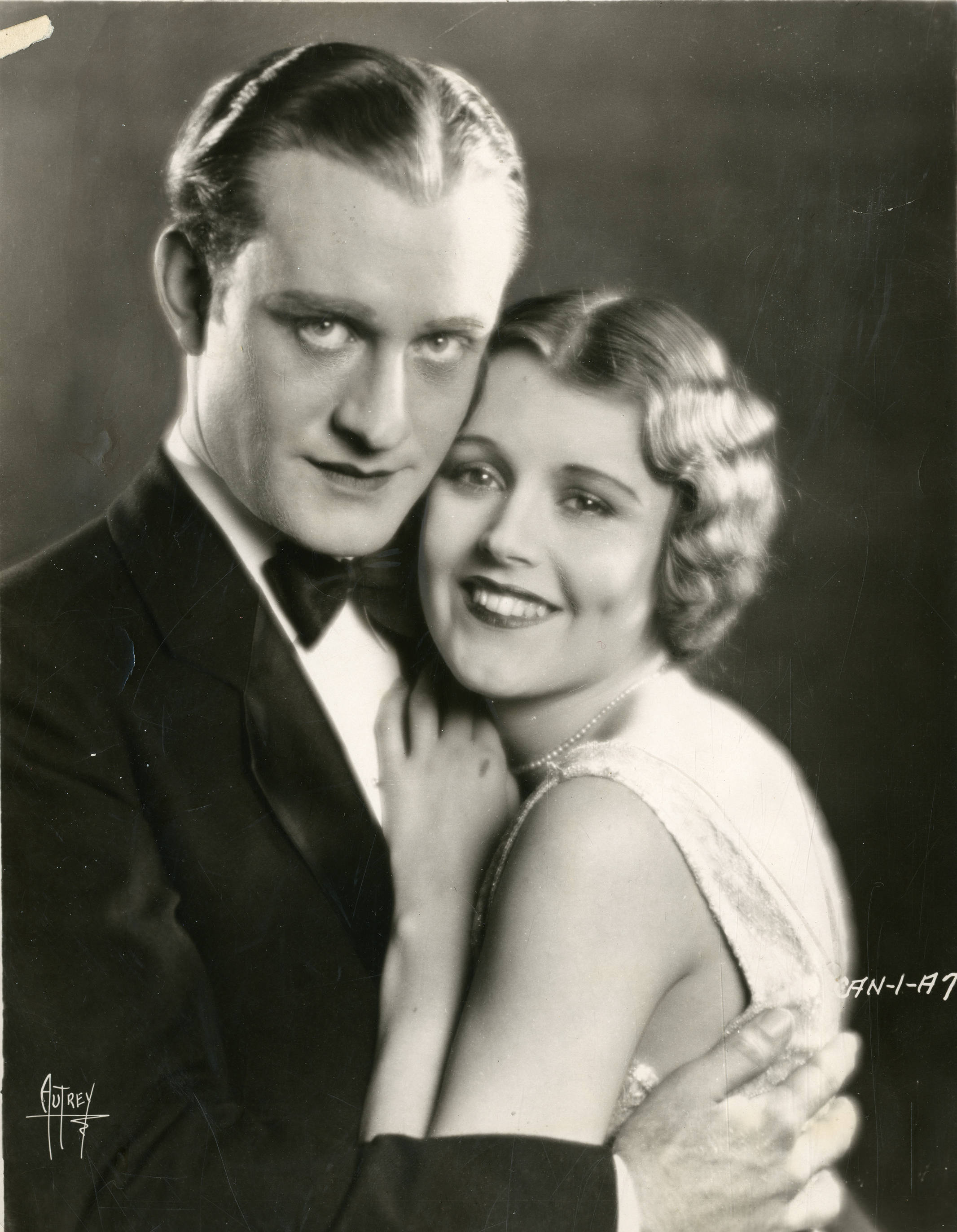
- Directed by: Raymond Cannon
- Screenplay by: Andrew Bennison; Charles R. Condon; Garrett Graham
- Story by: Raymond Cannon
- Starring: June Collyer; Conrad Nagel; Arthur Stone; Sharon Lynn; E. Alyn Warren; Ernest Hilliard
- Cinematography: Daniel B. Clark
- Production company: Fox Film Corporation
- Distributed by: Fox Film Corporation
- Release date: December 23, 1928
- Running time: 55 minutes
- Country: United States
- Languages: Sound (Synchronized) (English Intertitles)

Red Wine is a 1928 American comedy film directed by Raymond Cannon and written by Andrew Bennison, Charles R. Condon and Garrett Graham. While the film has no audible dialog, it was released with a synchronized musical score with sound effects using the sound-on-film movietone process. The film stars June Collyer, Conrad Nagel, Arthur Stone, Sharon Lynn, E. Alyn Warren, and Ernest Hilliard. The film was released on December 23, 1928, by Fox Film Corporation.

== Plot ==
Charles (Conrad Nagel) is the epitome of domestic regularity — a mild, meticulous man who wakes at precisely 7:26 a.m., shaves (cutting his chin on schedule every Monday, Wednesday, and Saturday), and breakfasts on eggs boiled for one minute and eighteen seconds. His life, governed by habit and order, is shared with his sweet but conventional wife, Alice (June Collyer).

Charles’s predictability earns him the nickname “Old Faithful” at the office, but things begin to shift when a bold and alluring new secretary, Miss Jones (Sharon Lynn), joins the firm. She turns heads — including Charles’s — and her arrival prompts his friend and co-worker, Jack Stone (Arthur Stone), to suggest Charles needs to sample the "red wine of life." Jack tempts Charles to cut loose and attend a party at the notorious Club Exotique, urging him to “forget marriage” and remember that “you’re only young once.”

After some hesitation, Charles gives in.

At the Club Exotique, he’s plunged into a night of exotic spectacle and drunken revelry. Spanish, Hawaiian, and Chinese dancers perform to the crowd's delight. Charles drinks heavily for the first time since college and quickly becomes the butt of a practical joke. Jack and his friends watch with glee as Charles grows increasingly inebriated, and they stage a scandal: after he passes out, they drape women’s clothes around his hotel room to suggest he’s spent the night in sinful company.

The next morning, Charles awakens groggy, guilt-ridden, and deeply confused. Miss Jones teasingly greets him at the office with a knowing smirk, and Charles obsesses over the phrase Jack had repeated — “Young once” — scribbling it like a confession. He is too ashamed to tell Alice.

Then comes a cruel twist of fate: that very night is the Davises’ wedding anniversary, and Alice insists they celebrate at the very same Club Exotique. Despite Charles’s desperate attempts to dissuade her, she’s determined — “I’d like to be just a little bit wicked for once,” she says playfully.

At the club, Charles is immediately recognized by the waiters and dancers from the night before. Their teasing banter and suggestive glances bewilder Alice, who begins to suspect there’s more to her husband’s story than he’s letting on. Matters spiral when Jack’s prankster friends return and mockingly refer to Charles’s “latest conquest.”

Mortified, Charles storms out and confronts Jack on a nearby rooftop. The tension breaks when Jack finally confesses: nothing happened. After Charles passed out, it was all staged — the women’s clothes, the room setup, the gossip. It was only a joke.

With the truth revealed, Charles rushes back to Alice, who is still at the club. There, amid the final strains of music and dancing, he takes her in his arms and explains everything. The misunderstanding is forgiven, and they share a tender waltz beneath the club’s glittering lights.

As the music swells, Charles and Alice embrace, united once more in love and laughter. “You’re right, dear,” Charles tells her softly. “We’re only young once.”

== Cast ==
- June Collyer as Alice Cook
- Conrad Nagel as Charles H. Cook (aka "Charles Dickens Davis" in film script)
- Arthur Stone as Jack Brown
- Sharon Lynn as Miss Scott
- E. Alyn Warren as Jack's first friend
- Ernest Hilliard as Jack's second friend
- Ernest Wood as Jack's third friend
- Marshall Ruth as Jack's fourth friend
- Dixie Gay as Stenographer
- Margaret La Marr as Spanish cigarette girl
- Bo Ling as Chinese dancer
- Dolores Johnson as Mrs. Brown
- Mike Tellegen as Head waiter
- Betty Lorraine as Slinky
- Lialani Deas as Hawaiian dancer

== Music ==
The soundtrack features the song "Once In A Lifetime" by Jesse Greer and Raymond Klages as the theme song.

== Censorship ==
Like many American films of the time, Red Wine was subject to cuts by city and state film censorship boards. In Kansas, with its themes of drinking and suggested marital infidelity, the Board of Censorship banned the film.

== See also ==
- List of early sound feature films (1926–1929)
