= Henry Anderton =

English painter

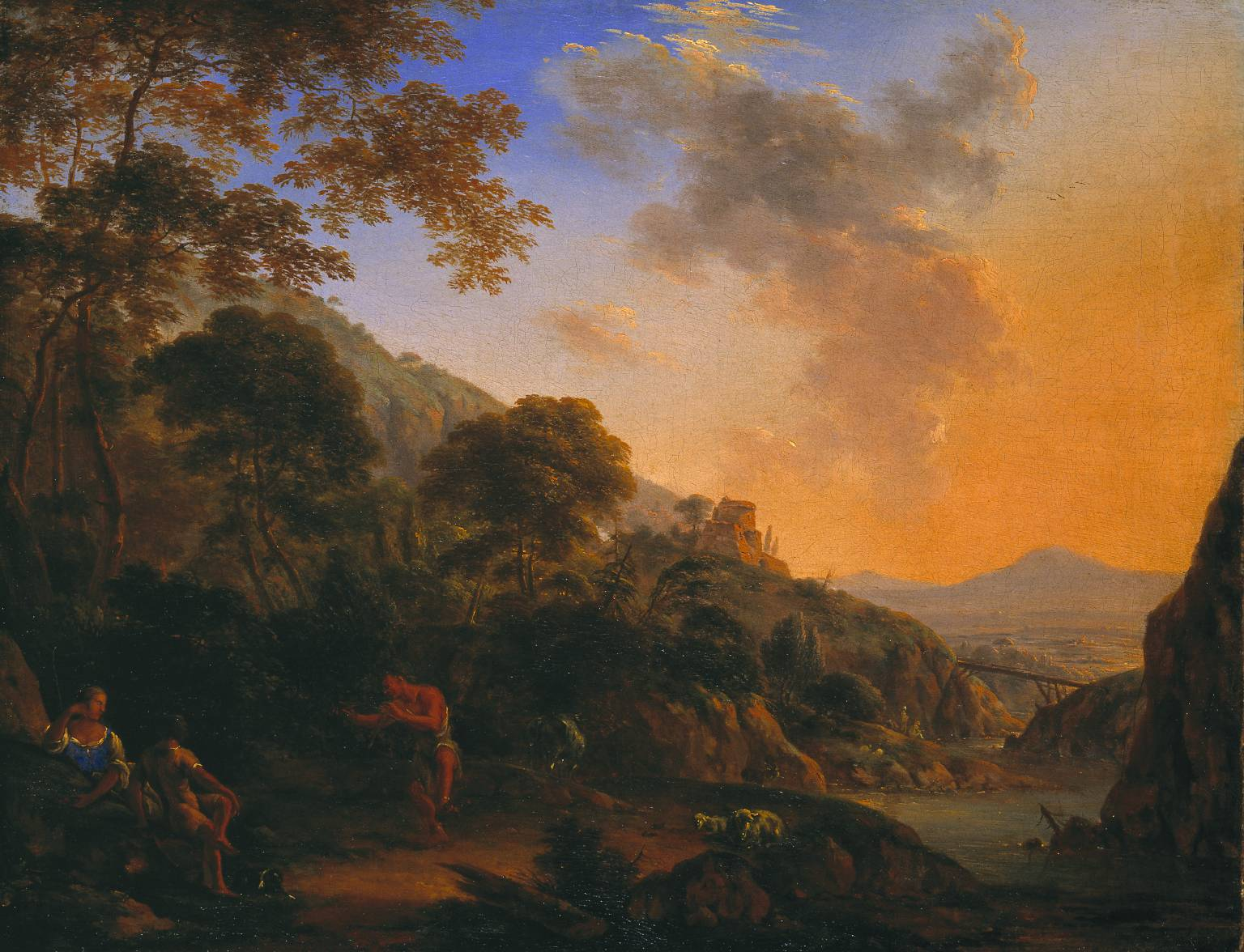
Mountain Landscape with Dancing Shepherd, painted between 1650 and 1660

Henry Anderton (1630–1667) was an English painter, mainly known for his portraits.

== Life ==
He was a pupil of Robert Streater, at one time a famous painter, and in choice of subjects he followed his master. He painted portraits, landscapes, still-life and historical subjects. He made a tour of Italy, and was employed by the court on his return. Bainbrigg Buckeridge in his Essay towards the English School describes him as "in great esteem about the year 1665, which he did not long survive." His most celebrated work was a portrait of Mrs. Stuart, afterwards Duchess of Richmond. His success with this portrait obtained for him sittings from Charles II and from many members of his court. There are no engraved portraits bearing his name, and it is possible that much of his work has been misattributed to Sir Peter Lely, of whom he was in some way the rival.

Anderton and his wife Dorathy lived in the parish of St Giles-in-the-Fields in London. Leaving Dorathy a widow, Anderton died between 8 and 21 October 1667 and was buried in the parish.
