= The Woman Who Was Forgotten =

Short story by American author Bess Streeter Aldrich and its film adaptation

The Woman Who Was Forgotten is a short story by Bess Streeter Aldrich first published in 1926. It is about a retired high school teacher who realizes that she will not be able to support herself at the same time that she discovers that the high school where she spent her career is slated to be torn down. On a last visit to the old high school, she is surprised by her former students who, unbeknownst to her, have raised money on her behalf.

A movie based on Streeter's short story, also titled The Woman Who Was Forgotten, was released in 1931. This story involves themes similar to Aldrich’s novel Miss Bishop (1933).

== Summary ==
As the story opens, Miss Miller has returned to her cottage home in a midwestern small town where she worked for many years as a teacher and principal. Her plans to live with her niece upon her retirement did not go as planned, and she realizes that she does not have enough money to support herself even after teaching her whole adult life. Then she sees in the local newspaper that the high school is to be torn down and replaced. Miss Miller asks the school’s janitor, whose son she had as a student, if she can visit the school one last time.

The night before the school is set to be razed, Miss Miller gets the key from the janitor and visits her old classroom, feeling nostalgic and sad and fearing for her own future. She is jarred out of her thoughts by the apparent sounds of Latin conjugation. Following the voices, she comes across a roomful of her former students, gathered to surprise her. Now-adult alumni offer testimonials as to the impact Miss Miller had on their lives, and each graduating class presents her with a check. Miss Miller’s former students make plans to have her over for dinner, but she stays until she can be alone in the building again, writing an inspirational quote on the chalkboard one last time before leaving.

== Reception ==
The Woman Who Was Forgotten was originally published in The American Magazine in 1926. Following its publication, the National Education Association reprinted it in the National Education Association Journal. When the film rights to the story were sold, Aldrich donated a part of the proceeds to a Washington D.C. home for retired teachers. Like much of Aldrich’s work, “The Woman Who Was Forgotten” “affirms life, and her characters find, usually, some reason for happiness, be it through love or belief in honor and duty." Aldrich developed a similar theme in her novel, Miss Bishop, where students also gather to celebrate a former teacher, only in that text the action takes place at a college rather than a high school.

== Film adaptation ==
In 1930, States Cinema Corp released an early sound-era film adaptation of the same name and featured the theme song “Give to the World the Best You Have.” The film starred LeRoy Mason, Belle Bennett, and Jack Mower. The movie was later edited for television and broadcast as Give to the World.
