= Captured in Chinatown =

- Directed by: Elmer Clifton
- Written by: George Arthur Durlam (story, continuity and dialogue); Elmer Clifton (continuity and dialogue)
- Produced by: Bert Sternbach (supervising producer); Louis Weiss (producer)
- Starring: See below
- Cinematography: Harry Forbes
- Edited by: Ralph Holt
- Release date: 1935
- Running time: 54 minutes
- Country: United States
- Language: English

Captured in Chinatown is a 1935 American film directed by Elmer Clifton.

== Plot ==
A feud between two gangs in Chinatown breaks out into a Tong war.

== Cast ==
- Tarzan (the police dog) as Tarzan
- Marion Shilling as Ann Parker
- Charles Delaney as Bob Martin
- Philo McCullough as Raymond
- Paul Ellis as Zamboni
- Robert Walker as Harry, Henchman
- Bobby Nelson as Bobby, Newsboy
- John Elliott as Butler, City Editor
- Bo Ling as Joy Ling
- James B. Leong as Wong
- Wing Foo as Tom Wong
- Paul C. Fong as Lieu Ling
