= Petticoat Fever =

1936 film by George Fitzmaurice

- Directed by: George Fitzmaurice
- Screenplay by: Harold Goldman
- Based on: Petticoat Fever; 1935 play by Mark Reed
- Produced by: Frank Davis
- Starring: Robert Montgomery; Myrna Loy; Reginald Owen; Winifred Shotter; Otto Yamaoka
- Cinematography: Ernest Haller
- Edited by: Fredrick Y. Smith
- Music by: William Axt
- Production company: Metro-Goldwyn-Mayer
- Distributed by: Loew's Inc.
- Release date: March 20, 1936
- Running time: 80 minutes
- Country: United States
- Language: English
- Budget: $247,000
- Box office: $1,080,000

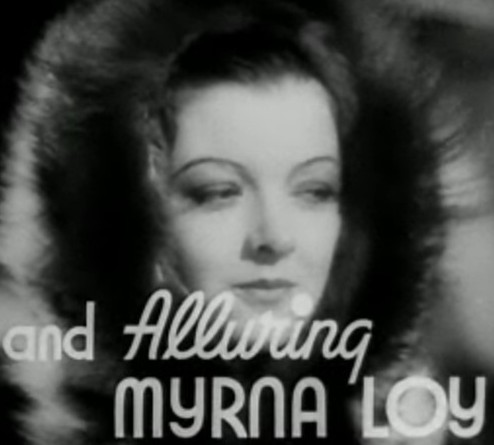

Petticoat Fever is a 1936 American comedy film directed by George Fitzmaurice and written by Harold Goldman. The film stars Robert Montgomery, Myrna Loy, Reginald Owen, Winifred Shotter and Otto Yamaoka. The film was released on March 20, 1936, by Metro-Goldwyn-Mayer.

== Plot ==
Telegraph operator Dascom Dinsmore, who has been living in an isolated cabin in Labrador for two years, has a bad case of "cabin fever," caused by his many months without seeing any women. His Eskimo servant Kimo tries to interest him in two native women, but Dascom wants nothing to do with them. His near desperate fever is abated when aviator Sir James Felton's plane makes an emergency landing nearby and Dascom discovers that Jim's companion is the beautiful Irene Campion. Though Jim warns Irene that Dascom is a bit crazy and unkempt, when she arrives at the cabin, Dascom has transformed himself into a well groomed English gentleman. Later, to impress her, he wears a tuxedo and prepares a formal dinner party for her. Though Jim is increasingly worried about Dascom's enthusiastic attentions toward Irene, he doesn't realize that she is becoming attracted to Dascom as well. After Jim and Irene learn via a radio broadcast that Dascom has sent a wireless message confirming their safety but not asking for the rescue ship they requested, Jim secretly arranges to take a dog sled to the supply post with Irene. Dascom suspects something, however, and has one of the Eskimo women, "Little Seal," take Irene's place in the sled. After Jim has left, Dascom tells Irene he loves her and she finally admits she loves him, too. However, because she is fond of Jim, who once saved her life, she convinces Dascom to bring him back so that she can tell him face-to-face that she isn't going to marry him. While Dascom goes after Jim, Clara Wilson, Dascom's English fiancée, from whom he has heard nothing for two years, shows up and professes her love. When Dascom and Jim return, Irene wants Dascom to break off with Clara immediately, but because he says he can't just "leave her out in the snow," Irene angrily tells him she doesn't want to see him again and goes off with Jim. The next day, just as the rector whom Clara telegraphed to marry them is about to perform the ceremony, an unhappy Dascom decides to delay the ceremony by opening a piece of mail that arrived for him a few days previously. When he learns that his uncle, a duke, has died and left his title and entire estate to him, Dascom realizes why Clara suddenly showed up and rushes off to stop Irene and Jim. On the boat that brought Clara, the captain is in the middle of Jim and Irene's wedding ceremony when Dascom arrives and tells her that he and Clara are finished. As Jim and the captain look on incredulously, Irene then goes off happily with Dascom in the dogsled.

== Cast ==
- Robert Montgomery as Dascom Dinsmore
- Myrna Loy as Irene Campion
- Reginald Owen as Sir James Felton
- Winifred Shotter as Clara Wilson
- Otto Yamaoka as Kimo
- George Hassell as Captain Landry
- Forrester Harvey as Scotty
- Irving Bacon as Carl
- Bo Ching as 'Big Seal'

== Box office ==
The film grossed a total (domestic and foreign) of $1,080,000: $693,000 from the US and Canada and $387,000 elsewhere. It made a profit of $468,000.
