= Born to Battle (1926 film) =

1926 film

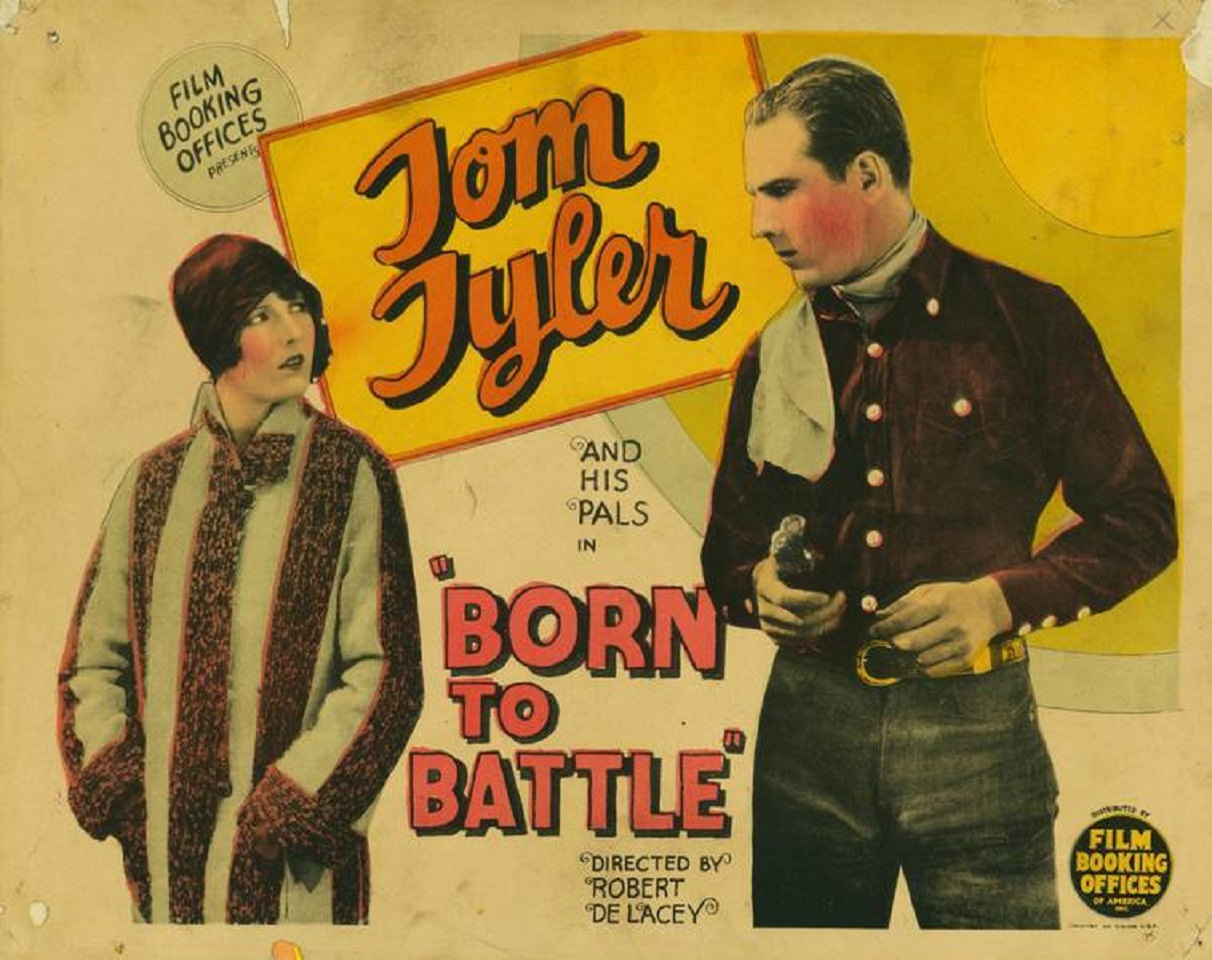
- Lobby card
- Directed by: Robert De Lacey
- Written by: William E. Wing
- Starring: Tom Tyler; Jean Arthur; Frankie Darro
- Cinematography: David Smith; Harold Wenstrom
- Production company: Robertson-Cole Pictures Corporation
- Distributed by: Film Booking Offices of America; Ideal Films (UK)
- Release date: January 24, 1926
- Running time: 50 minutes
- Country: United States
- Language: Silent (English intertitles)

Born to Battle is a 1926 American silent Western film directed by Robert De Lacey and starring Tom Tyler, Jean Arthur and Frankie Darro. Tyler also starred in the 1935 film of the same name, but that western film has a different plot and is unrelated to the 1926 film.

== Plot ==
As described in a film magazine review, Denny Terhune, known as "Irish" and foreman of the Morgan ranch, is feared by Manager Daley and his henchman. They know that there is oil on the ranch property and are plotting to gain control of it. They ship Denny away and have him shanghaied, but he escapes and comes back. He meets Morgan's daughter Eunice, but she looks at him as being a roughneck. Finally, Denny defeats the plans of the conspirators, beats them up, and convinces Eunice, that he would be the ideal husband for her after all.

== Cast ==
- Tom Tyler as Dennis Terhune
- Jean Arthur as Eunice Morgan
- Ray Childs as Moxley
- Fred Gamble as Morgan
- Frankie Darro as Birdie
- Buck Black as Tuffy
- LeRoy Mason as Daley
- Ethan Laidlaw as Trube
- Nora Cecil (uncredited)
