= Bess Streeter Aldrich =

American author

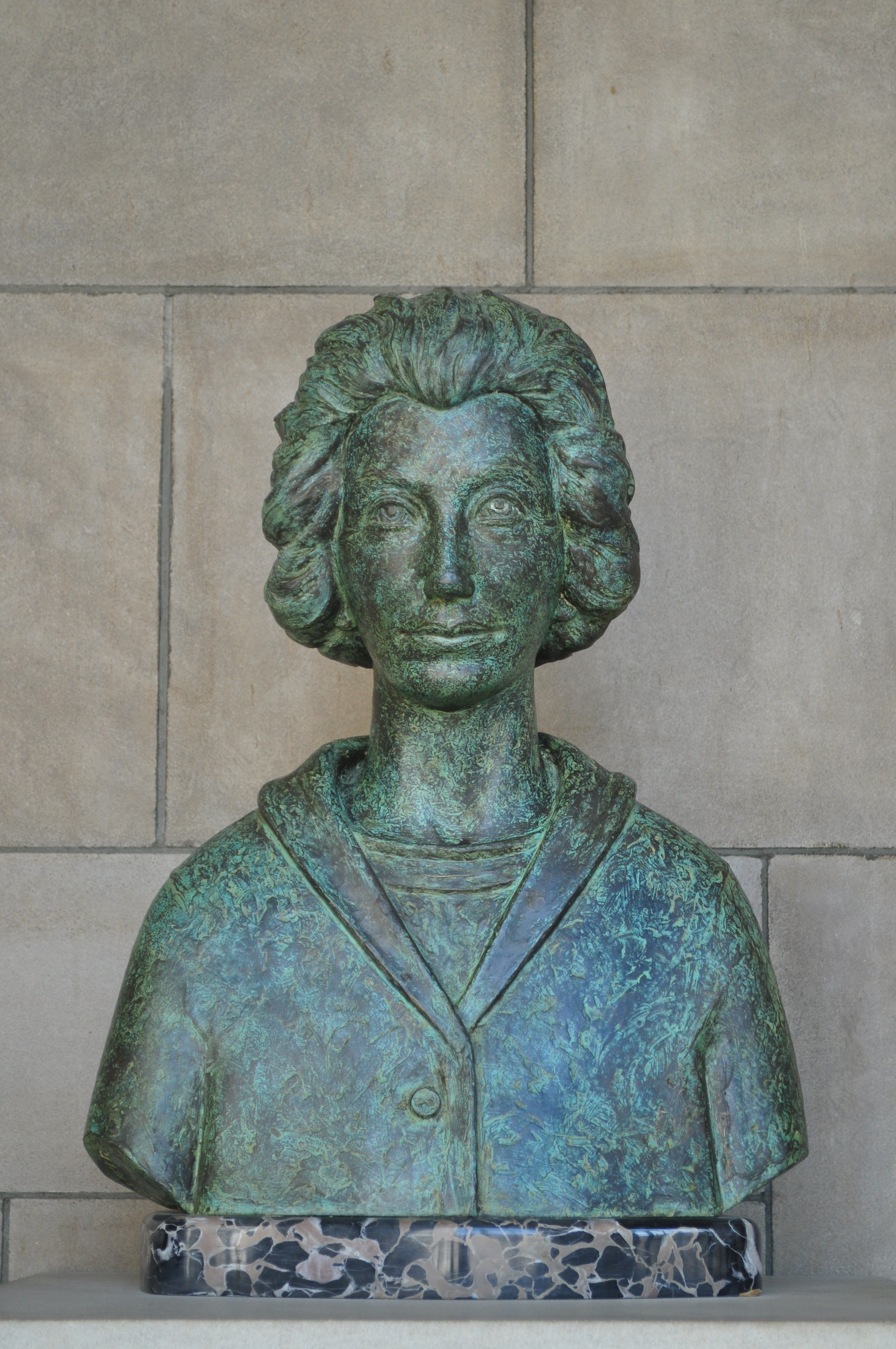
- Bess Streeter Aldrich bust by Herman Albert Becker
- Born: Bess Genevra Streeter; February 17, 1881; Cedar Falls, Iowa, U.S.
- Died: August 3, 1954 (aged 73); Lincoln, Nebraska, U.S.
- Occupation: Writer (novelist)
- Spouse: Charles Aldrich
- Writing career
- Pen name: Margaret Dean Stephens
- Period: 20th century
- Genre: Fiction
- Notable works: "The Woman Who Was Forgotten", Miss Bishop

Bess Streeter Aldrich (pen name, Margaret Dean Stephens; February 17, 1881 – August 3, 1954) was an American author.

== Life and career ==
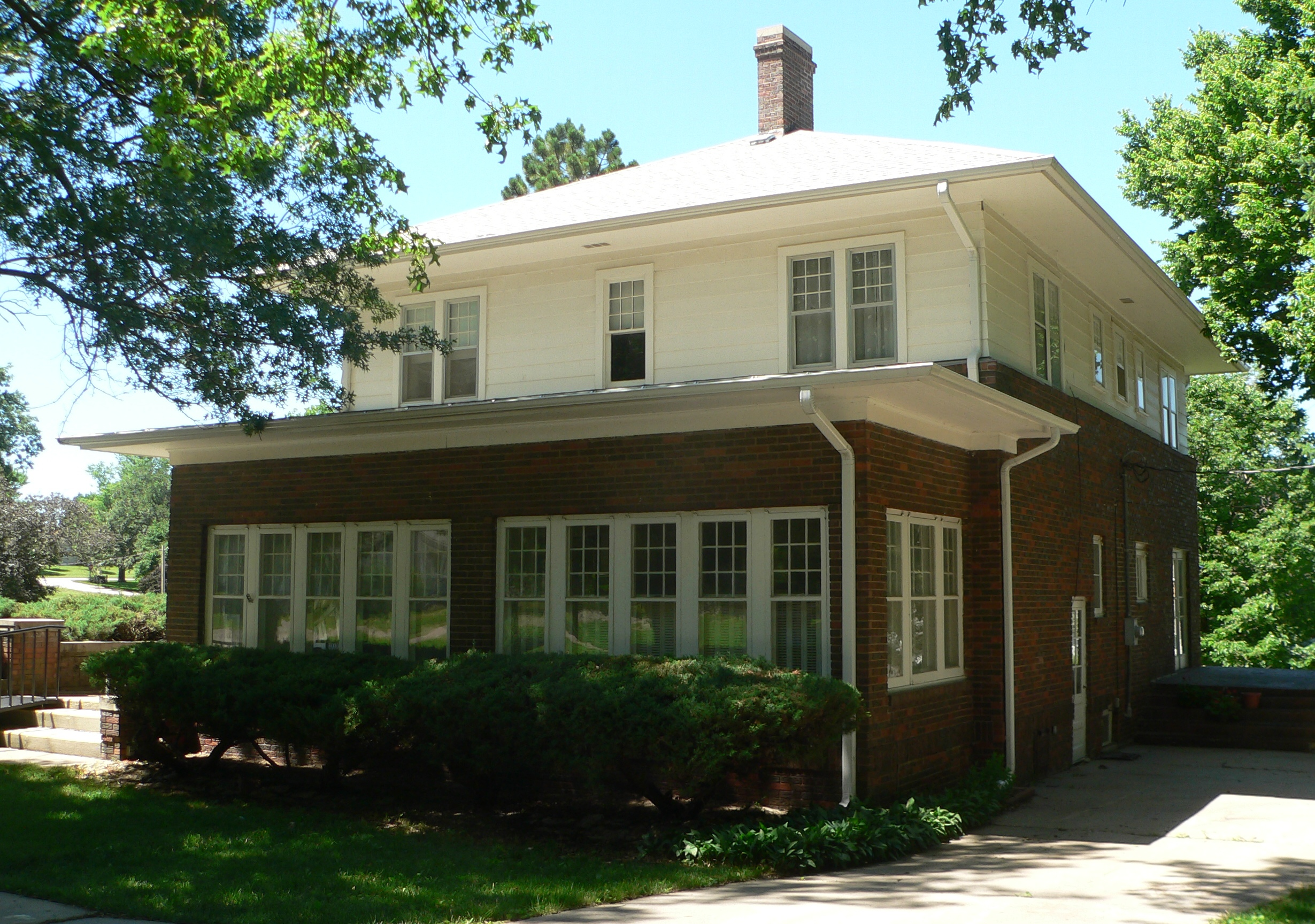
The Elms, Aldrich's home in Elmwood, Nebraska, is listed in the National Register of Historic Places.

Bess Genevra Streeter was born in Cedar Falls, Iowa. She was the last of the eight children of James Wareham and Mary Wilson Anderson Streeter. Attending high school in Cedar Falls, she was the winner of two magazine fiction-writing contests prior to graduating at age 17. After graduating from Iowa State Normal School with a teaching certificate, she taught school at several locations in Utah, later returning to Cedar Falls to earn an advanced degree in education.

In 1907, she married Charles Sweetzer Aldrich, who had graduated with a law degree from Iowa State University and had been one of the youngest captains in the Spanish–American War. Following the war, he served for years as a U.S. Commissioner in Alaska. They had four children — Mary, Robert, Charles and James. In 1909, they moved with their children and Bess's widowed mother to Elmwood, Nebraska, where Charles, Bess, and Bess's sister and brother-in-law Clara and John Cobb purchased the American Exchange Bank. Elmwood became the location for many of her stories, albeit called by different names.

Aldrich began writing more regularly in 1911 when the Ladies' Home Journal advertised a fiction contest, which she entered and won $175 for her story "The Little House Next Door". After this success, she continued to write and submit work to publications such as McCall's, Harper's Weekly, and The American Magazine where she was generally paid between one and one-hundred dollars for her work. Prior to 1918 she wrote under her pen name, "Margaret Dean Stephens". She went on to become one of the highest-paid women writers of the period. Her stories often concerned the Heartland/Plains pioneer history and were very popular with teenage girls and young women.

Aldrich's first novel, Mother Mason, was published in 1924. When Charles died suddenly of a cerebral hemorrhage in 1925 at the age of 52, Aldrich took up writing as a means of supporting her family. She was the author of about 200 short stories, including "The Woman Who Was Forgotten" (adapted into a film of the same title in 1931), and thirteen novels, including Miss Bishop. The latter novel was made into the movie Cheers for Miss Bishop in 1941, which starred Martha Scott and Edmund Gwenn and premiered in Lincoln, Nebraska.

Aldrich received an honorary Doctor of Letters degree in literature from the University of Nebraska in 1934 and was named into the Nebraska Hall of Fame in 1971. In 1946, Aldrich moved to Lincoln, Nebraska, to be closer to her daughter and her writing slowed to just one story per year as age began to take its toll. She died of cancer on August 3, 1954, and was buried next to her husband in Elmwood, Nebraska.

Aldrich's papers are held at the Nebraska State Historical Society in Lincoln, Nebraska.

== Works ==
=== Novels ===
- Mother Mason (1924)
- The Rim of the Prairie (1925)
- The Cutters (1926)
- A Lantern in Her Hand (1928)
- A White Bird Flying (1931)
- Miss Bishop (1933)
- Spring Came On Forever (1935)
- The Man Who Caught the Weather (1936)
- Song of Years (1939)
- The Drum Goes Dead (1941)
- The Lieutenant's Lady (1942)
- Journey into Christmas (1949)
- The Bess Streeter Aldrich Reader (1950)
- A Bess Streeter Aldrich Treasury (1959) (posthumous)

=== Other books ===
- The Collected Short Works, 1907–1919
- The Collected Short Works, 1920–1954

=== Magazine and newspaper articles ===
- A Late Love, Baltimore News, (1898)
- The Outsider, Christian Herald (1945)
