= Spring Came On Forever =

1935 novel by Bess Streeter Aldrich

- Title page for Spring Came On Forever (1935)
- Author: Bess Streeter Aldrich
- Language: English
- Genre: Families - Fiction
- Publisher: New York: D. Appleton-Century
- Publication date: 1935
- Pages: 332
- OCLC: 1108892719
- Dewey Decimal: 813.52
- LC Class: PZ3.A3642 Sp PS3501.L378
- Website: http://gutenberg.net.au/ebooks05/0500651h.html

Spring Came On Forever is a 1935 novel by Bess Streeter Aldrich. One of Aldrich's "pioneer novels", it recounts the life of two American characters who head out West into the Nebraska Territory. The German-speaking Lutheran girl and the blacksmith's apprentice fall in love, but their plan to marry is thwarted by circumstances. Many years later, two descendants of theirs get married and unite two different traditions.

The novel, which speaks to the German immigration experience in the United States, was a great commercial success considering the time (the Great Depression); between October 1935 and January 1936 it sold over 45,000 copies. In March 1936, Aldrich was offered $20,000 for the movie rights, for a musical version by Oscar Hammerstein II and Jerome Kern.

In the 1980s and 1990s, the University of Nebraska Press republished a number of works by Aldrich; Spring was republished in 1985.
