= Ottilie A. Liljencrantz =

Ottilie Adelina Liljencrantz
- Born: January 19, 1876; Chicago, Illinois, U.S.
- Died: October 7, 1910 (aged 34); Chicago, Illinois, U.S.

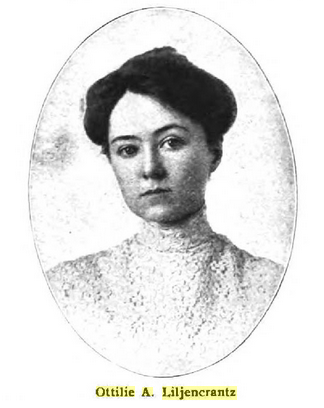

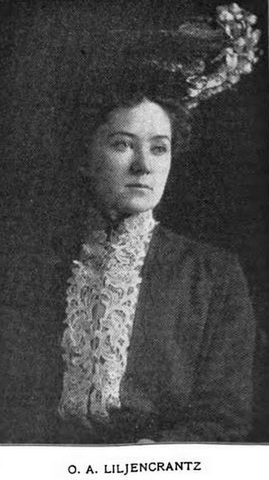
Ottilie A. Liljencrantz, from publications in 1908 (top) and 1902

Ottilie Adelina Liljencrantz (January 19, 1876 – October 7, 1910) was an American writer of Norse-themed historical novels.

== Early life ==
Ottilie Adelina Liljencrantz was born in Chicago, Illinois, the daughter of Gustave Adolph Mathias Liljencrantz, a civil engineer, and Adelina Charlotte Hall Liljencrantz. Her father was born in Sweden. "I wish that I could trace my descent to some renowned Viking," she confided in an interview, "and I will not relinquish the pleasant belief that I have some valiant ancestor on Valhalla's benches," but history only confirmed her as a descendant of sixteenth-century Swedish clergyman Laurentius Petri. Among her teachers was drama teacher Anna Morgan, who remembered Liljencrantz as "an attractive young woman with a mind unusually endowed. She had a vivid fancy and a true sense of proportion, she seemed to have been set apart for a career in literature".

== Career ==
When she was still a teenager, she wrote plays and produced them with the help of children in her neighborhood. One such drama, "In Fairyland" (1895), involved over 100 children when it was mounted as a benefit for the Home for Destitute Crippled Children.

Books by Liljencrantz included The Scrape that Jack Built (1897, a children's book), The Thrall of Leif the Lucky: A Story of Viking Days (1902, a novel about Leif Erikson), The Ward of King Canute (1903), The Vinland Champions (1904), Randvar the Songsmith: A Romance of Norumbega (1906, a novel with a werewolf theme), and A Viking's Love and Other Tales of the North (1911, a collection of short stories published posthumously). Troy Kinney and Margaret West Kinney illustrated three of Liljencrantz's books. Her novel The Thrall of Leif the Lucky was adapted for a silent film, The Viking (1928).

== Personal life ==
Liljencrantz died after a surgery to treat cancer in 1910, aged 34 years, in Chicago.
