= Robert Streater =

British artist

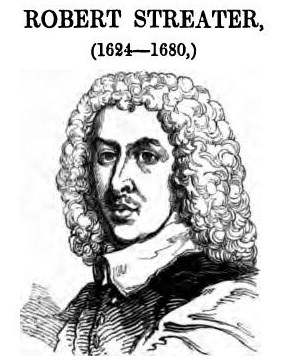
Robert Streater, self-portrait (engraving from Horace Walpole's Anecdotes of painting in England, vol. 2)

Robert Streater (1621–1679) (also known as Streeter), was an English landscape, history, still-life and portrait artist, architectural painter, and etcher. He was Serjeant Painter to King Charles II, and decorated the ceiling of Christopher Wren's Sheldonian Theatre in Oxford.

== Life and work ==
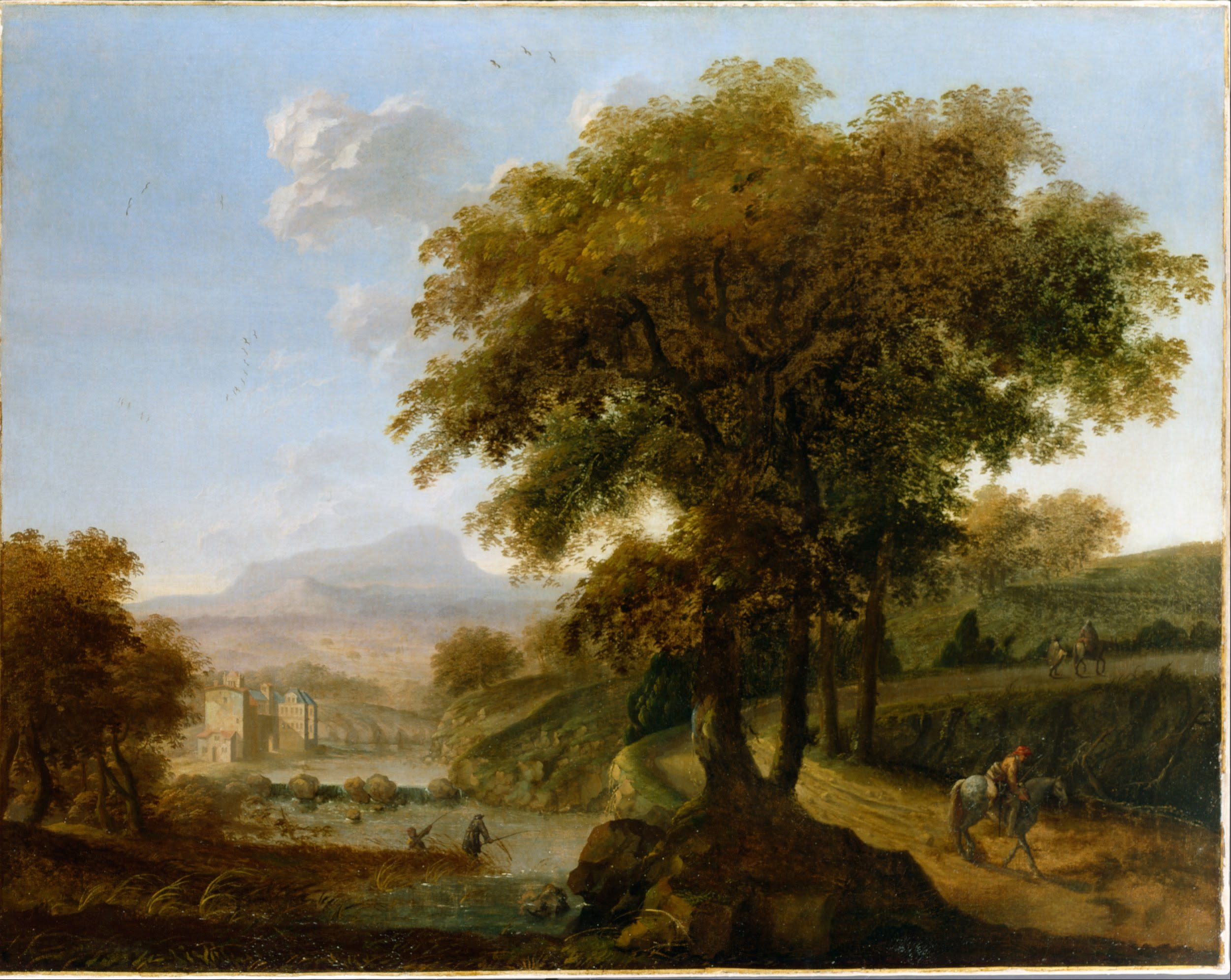
Landscape by Streeter (Dulwich Picture Gallery

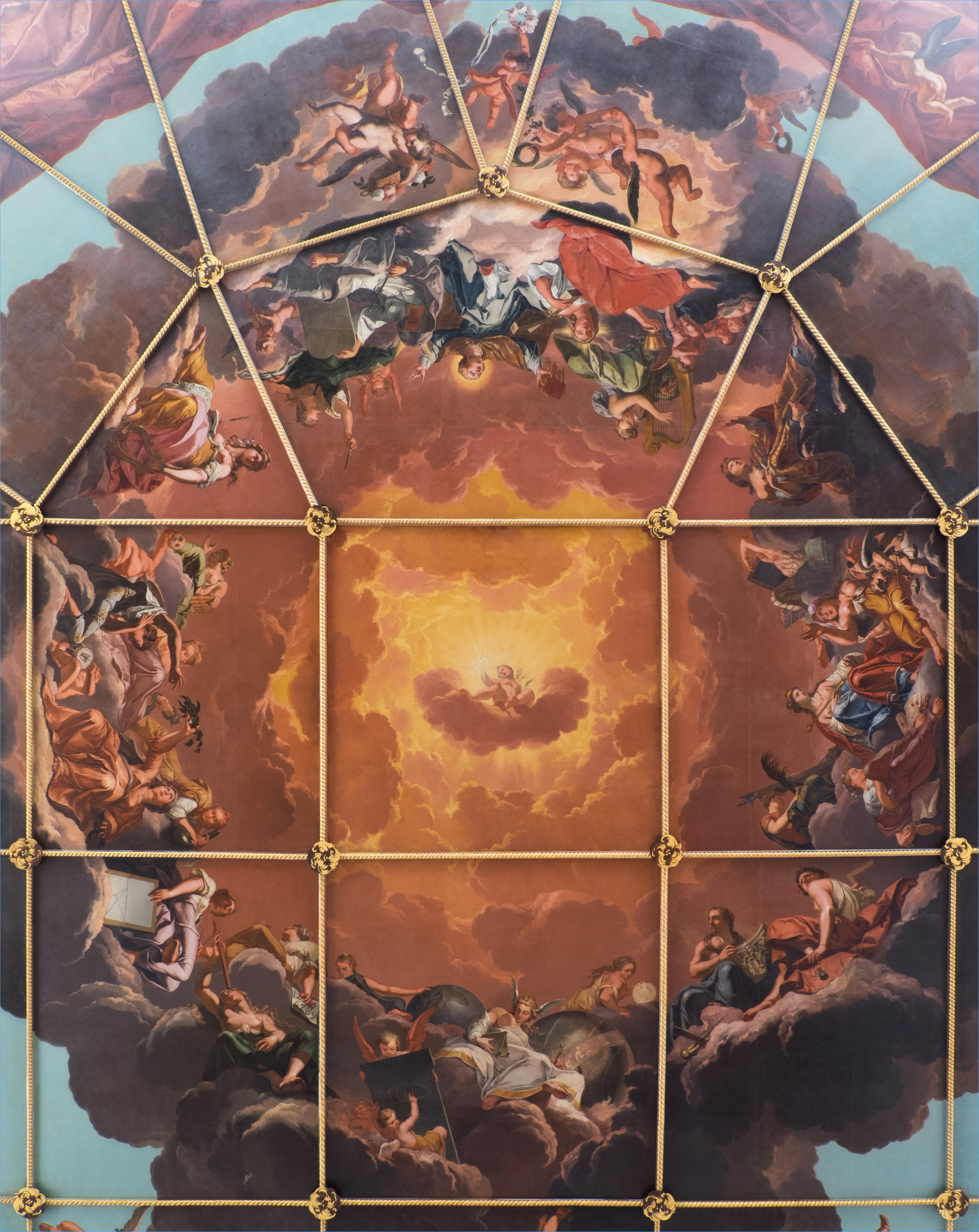
Streater's ceiling painting at the Sheldonian Theatre, Oxford

Streater was born in Covent Garden, London, and is said to have been the son of a painter, and to have received his instruction in painting and drawing from an artist called Du Moulin. He was very industrious, and attained considerable ability in his art, which was highly praised by his contemporaries. His style was founded on that of the Baroque Italian painters. He excelled in architectural and decorative paintings on a large scale, especially those in which perspective and a knowledge of foreshortening were required. He painted landscapes, especially topographical, with skill, and also still life. Sir William Sanderson, in his Graphice (1658), spoke of "Streter, who indeed is a compleat Master therein, as also in other Arts of Etching, Graving, and his works of Architecture and Perspective, not a line but is true to the Rules of Art and Symmetry".

In 1664 both Samuel Pepys and John Evelyn mentioned, and the latter described, "Mr. Thomas Povey's elegant house in Lincoln's Inn Fields, where the perspective in his court, painted by Streeter, is indeede excellent, with the vases in imitation of porphyrie and fountains". Pepys, in 1669, wrote that he "went to Mr. Streater, the famous history-painter, where I found Dr. Wren and other virtuosos looking upon the paintings he is making of the new theatre at Oxford", and described Streater as "a very civil little man and lame, but lives very handsomely".

Evelyn, in 1672, notes at Sir Robert Clayton's house, "the cedar dining-room painted with the history of the Gyants War, incomparably done by Mr. Streeter, but the figures are too near the eye" (the paintings were afterwards removed to Marden, near Godstone). Again in 1679 Evelyn noted that some of Streater's best paintings were at Mr. Boone's (or Bohun's) house, Lee Place, Blackheath. Streater's paintings in the ceiling of the Sheldonian Theatre at Oxford were eulogised by poetaster, Robert Whitehall (1625–85) in his poem 'Urania':

That future ages must confess they owe
To Streater more than Michael Angelo!

Streater also painted part of the chapel at All Souls', Oxford and ceilings at Whitehall, in London. Little of his decorative work now remains, except the ceiling of the Sheldonian Theatre at Oxford, which was restored in 1762 by Tilly Kettle and again, by a conservation studio, in November 2008. His panels of Moses and Aaron, painted for St Michael Cornhill, remain in the church, incorporated into the Victorian reredos.

Besides landscape, history, and still life, Streater also painted portraits. He etched a view of the Battle of Naseby, and designed some of the plates for Robert Stapleton's 'Juvenal'. Seven pictures by him, including five landscapes, were mentioned in a catalogue of James II's collection. Streater was a special favourite with Charles II, who made him serjeant-painter on his restoration to the throne. Streater's painting of Boscobel House, still in the British royal collection today, was recorded at Whitehall Palace in 1688 and is presumed to have been commissioned by Charles II. When Streater in his later years was suffering "from the stone", Charles II sent for a special surgeon from Paris to perform the necessary operation. Streater, however, died not long afterwards. in 1679.

He was succeeded as serjeant-painter by his son, Robert Streater Jr., at whose death, in 1711, Streater's books, prints, drawings, and pictures were sold at auction. He had a brother, Thomas Streater, who married a daughter, an artist herself, of Remigius Van Leemput. A self-portrait of Robert Streater was engraved for Horace Walpole's Anecdotes of Painting.

Henry Anderton (1630–1667) was a pupil of Streater.
