= Robert E. Streeter =

American academic

Robert Eugene Streeter (1916 – June 22, 2002) was an American academic. Throughout most of his academic career, he administered the University of Chicago.

Streeter was born in 1916 in Williamsport, Pennsylvania. He earned a bachelor's degree in English from Bucknell University in 1938, while he had a summer job as a sportswriter. He also earned a master's degree in 1940 and a doctorate in 1943, both from Northwestern University.

Declared ineligible to serve in World War II, Streeter instead began his teaching career at Bucknell University and Seoul National University in South Korea in 1946. The next year, he started teaching at the University of Chicago as an assistant professor of English literature. He became an associate professor in 1953 and then a professor in 1958, both of which specialized in American literature and culture.

Streeter also became a Dean of the College in 1954. At the time, after Robert Maynard Hutchins left the University of Chicago three years prior, a college named after Hutchins was already dismantled. Streeter helped his colleagues form a consensus to build a newer curriculum for students. He became a dean of the humanities division in 1963 and was then re-appointed in 1968. He retired from the University at the age of 70 in 1986. He later became a visiting professor at Colorado College and a visiting scholar of Phi Beta Kappa society.

Streeter earned an honorary degree of Doctor of Humane Letters in 1960 from and was given an Alumni Association Award in 1995 by the Bucknell University.

Streeter married Ruth Parker in 1941. His wife Ruth was a Tennessee elementary school teacher and a Chicago volunteer of children's literary. In 1988, two years after retirement, the married couple moved to Lewisburg, Pennsylvania. She died in 1998. Together Robert and Ruth had two children. Their son Allyn is a contracting director for the federal government. Their daughter Frear Streeter Simors is an editor for LexisNexis. They also have four grandchildren.

Streeter died on June 22, 2002, at the age of 85 in Geisinger Medical Center in Danville, Pennsylvania, of post-surgery complications, according to his son Allyn.

== Selected works ==
As author

- Streeter, Robert E. (1977). "WASPs and Other Endangered Species". Critical Inquiry. 3 (4): 725–739. doi:10.1086/447914. S2CID 162065910.

As editor

- The Province of Prose. Edited by William R. Keast and Streeter. New York City: Harper & Brothers, 1956. Second edition: 1959.
- Bucknell: Now & Then: A Sesquicentennial Miscellany. Dallas, Texas: Taylor Publishing Company, 1995.
