= George Kotsonaros =

American actor (1892–1933)

- Born: Giorgios Demetrios Kotsonaros; October 16, 1892; Nafplio, Greece
- Died: July 13, 1933 (aged 40); Eutaw, Alabama, U.S.
- Occupations: Wrestler, actor

George Kotsonaros (Greek: Γεώργιος Κωτσονάρος; October 16, 1892 – July 13, 1933) was a Greek professional wrestler and film actor. He acted mostly in silent pictures. His original name was Giorgios Demetrios Kotsonaros. He emigrated to the United States in July 1910.

His swarthy, menacing face—and pugilist's rearranged nose—got him many roles as a tough guy or a prizefighter at a time when boxing movies were a flourishing subgenre due to the sport's huge popularity with the public.

Most of Kotsonaros's films are today considered lost. Later, Kotsonaros began a career in professional wrestling.

On July 13, 1933, Kotsonaros was driving through Alabama when his car overturned, killing him.

== Filmography ==
- Honeymoon Lane (1931) as Nolay
- Dangerous Paradise (1930) as Pedro
  a.k.a. Two Against Death (USA: alternative title)
- The Body Punch (1929) as Paul Steinert
- The Shakedown (1929) as Battling Roff
- We Faw Down (1928) as One-Round Kelly (uncredited)
  a.k.a. We Slip Up (UK)
- Beggars of Life (1928) as Baldy (uncredited)
- Street of Sin (1928) as Iron Mike
- The Fifty-Fifty Girl (1928) as Buck (the Gorilla Man)
- The Love Mart (1927) as Fleming Henchman (uncredited)
- The Private Life of Helen of Troy (1927) as Hector
  a.k.a. Helen of Troy (USA)
- The Wizard (1927) as The Gorilla
- King of the Jungle (1927, serial)
- Catch-As-Catch-Can (1927) as Butch
- The Tender Hour (1927) as The Wrestler
- When a Man Loves (1927) as Convict Prisoner (uncredited)
  a.k.a. His Lady (UK)
- While London Sleeps (1926) as The Monk
- Cupid's Knockout (1926)
- The Fighting Doctor (1926)
- Vanishing Millions (1926)
