= Milloy =

Milloy is a surname. Notable people with the surname include:

- Albert E. Milloy (born 1921), Major General, United States Army
- Christin Milloy, Canadian politician and LGBT activist
- John Milloy (born 1965), former politician in Ontario, Canada
- Lawyer Milloy (born 1973), former American college and professional football player
- May Milloy (1875–1967), American actress on Broadway, vaudeville, and in several films
- Steven Milloy, lawyer, lobbyist, author and Fox News commentator
