= Eugenia Gilbert =

American actress (1902–1978)

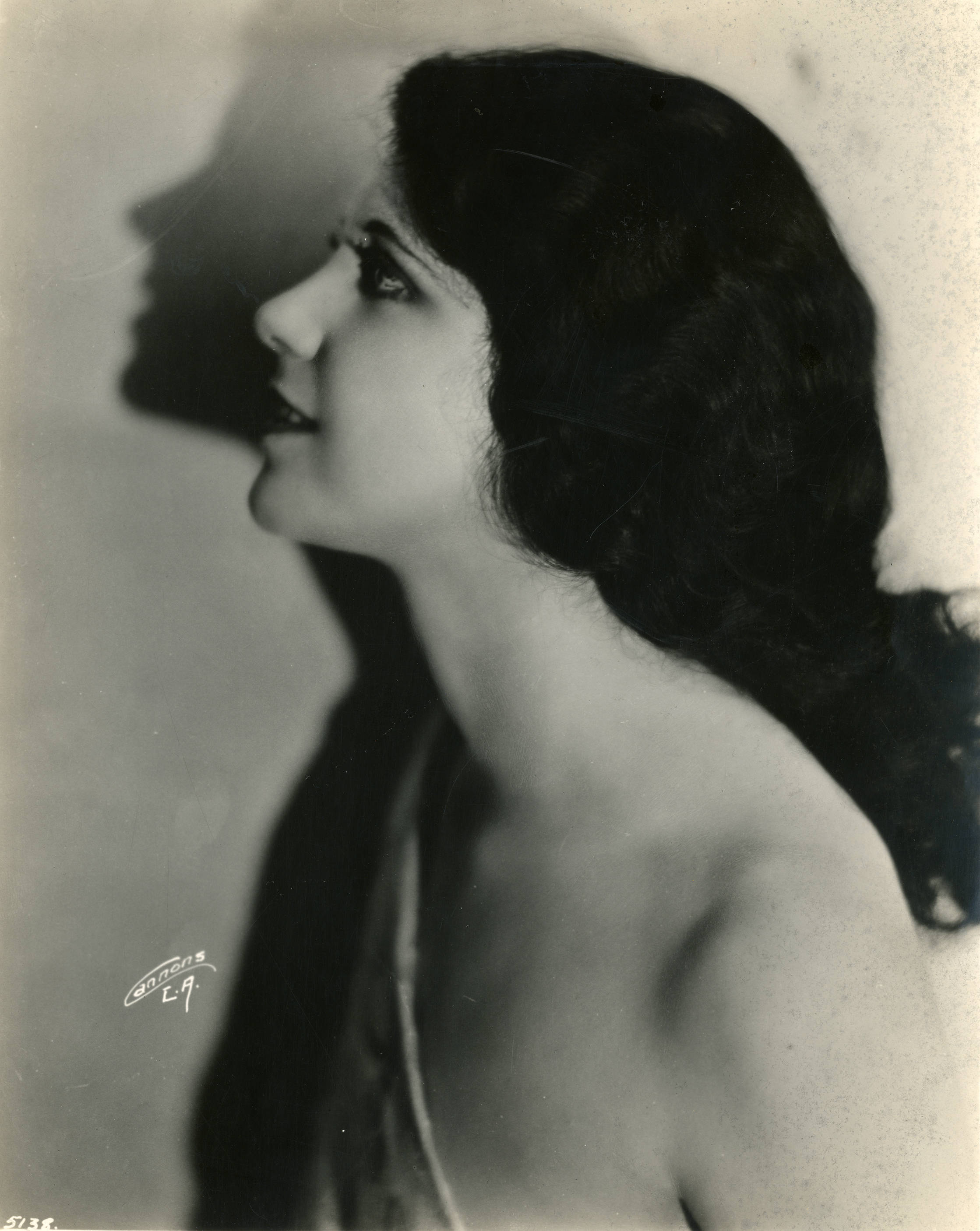
- Gilbert in 1924
- Born: November 18, 1902
- Died: December 9, 1978 (aged 76); Santa Monica, California
- Other name: Eugenie Gilbert
- Occupation: Actress
- Years active: 1920–1929 (film)

Eugenia Gilbert (born Genevieve May Knapp, November 18, 1902 – December 9, 1978) was an American film actress of the 1920s. She appeared as a leading lady in a number of western features., serials, and short comedies. In at least three films, she was billed as Eugenie Gilbert.

== Biography ==
Gilbert was the daughter of William B. Knapp and Nellie Eugenia (Gilbert) Knapp. She attended schools in South Orange, New Jersey, and New York City and the Marlborough School in Los Angeles. She won 14 beauty contests, one of which was a national contest sponsored by Rudolph Valentino, which led him to consider her "the most beautiful girl in America."

She adopted the professional name of Eugenia Gilbert, taking her mother's middle and maiden names. In 1924, Gilbert had her first role as leading lady in a film, after having smaller parts in westerns and comedies. In 1925, she signed a contract with Mack Sennett to act exclusively in his comedy films "for the next several years", but her stay was short. She signed with rival comedy producer Hal Roach and worked opposite comedy star Charley Chase off and on through 1929.

Eugenia Gilbert became the leading lady to cowboy stars, appearing in several features starring Leo Maloney or Hoot Gibson. The low-budget Weiss Bros. studio co-starred her in two adventure serials, Perils of the Jungle (1927) opposite Frank Merrill, and The Mysterious Airman (1928) opposite Walter Miller.

The arrival of talking pictures slowed the production of action and western subjects, with new emphasis on spoken dialogue. Gilbert's only talking picture was Universal's Courtin' Trouble (1929), starring Hoot Gibson and featuring Eugenia Gilbert as "Calamity June". In November 1930 she was still listed among the clients of agents Harry Gould and Mannie Price, and for many years Film Daily published her name every November in its "Birthday Greetings" section, but Eugenia Gilbert had already quit the movies. She was last seen on the screen in 1945, when her old boss Louis Weiss and director Harry Fraser incorporated footage from her 1927 serial Perils of the Jungle into a new jungle thriller, The White Gorilla.

== Filmography ==
- A Certain Rich Man (1921)
- The Man of the Forest (1921)
- The Man from Downing Street (1922)
- The Half Breed (1922)
- Wildcat Jordan (1922)
- Souls in Bondage (1923)
- Picking Peaches (1924)*uncredited
- Sinners in Silk (1924)
- Great Diamond Mystery (1924)
- The Back Trail (1924)
- So This Is Marriage (1924)
- Flames of Desire (1924)
- A Broadway Butterfly (1925)
- The Scarlet Honeymoon (1925)
- The Dressmaker from Paris (1925)
- Seven Chances (1925)
- The Man from the West (1926)
- Obey The Law (1926)
- Hair-Trigger Baxter (1926)
- Wild to Go (1926)
- The Valley of Bravery (1926)
- Laddie (1926)
- Transcontinental Limited (1926)
- Beyond the Rockies (1926)
- The Test of Donald Norton (1926)
- There Ain't No Santa Claus (1926)
- The Crimson Flash (1927)
- Border Blackbirds (1927)
- The Long Loop on the Pecos (1927)
- The Man from Hard Pan (1927)
- Don Desperado (1927)
- By Whose Hand? (1927)
- Melting Millions (1927)
- The Swell-Head (1927)
- Perils of the Jungle (1927, serial)
- The Danger Rider (1928)
- The Apache Raider (1928)
- The Boss of Rustler's Roost (1928)
- The Phantom City (1928)
- The Mysterious Airman (1928, serial)
- The Bronc Stomper (1928)
- After the Storm (1928)
- Movie Night (1929)
- Courtin' Wildcats (1929, her only sound film)
- The White Gorilla (1945, in silent footage from Perils of the Jungle)

== Bibliography ==
- Buck Rainey. Sweethearts of the Sage: Biographies and Filmographies of 258 Actresses Appearing in Western Movies. McFarland & Company, 1992.
