= Speed Madness =

Speed Madness may refer to:

- Speed Madness (1925 film), American silent action film
- Speed Madness (1932 film), American action film
