= Clara Horton =

American actress

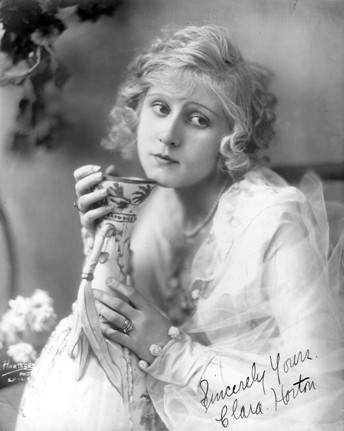
- Horton, ca. 1920
- Born: Clara Marie Horton; July 29, 1904; Brooklyn, New York, U.S.
- Died: December 4, 1976 (aged 72); Encino, California, U.S.
- Other name: "The Eclair Kid"
- Occupation: Actress
- Years active: 1912–1942

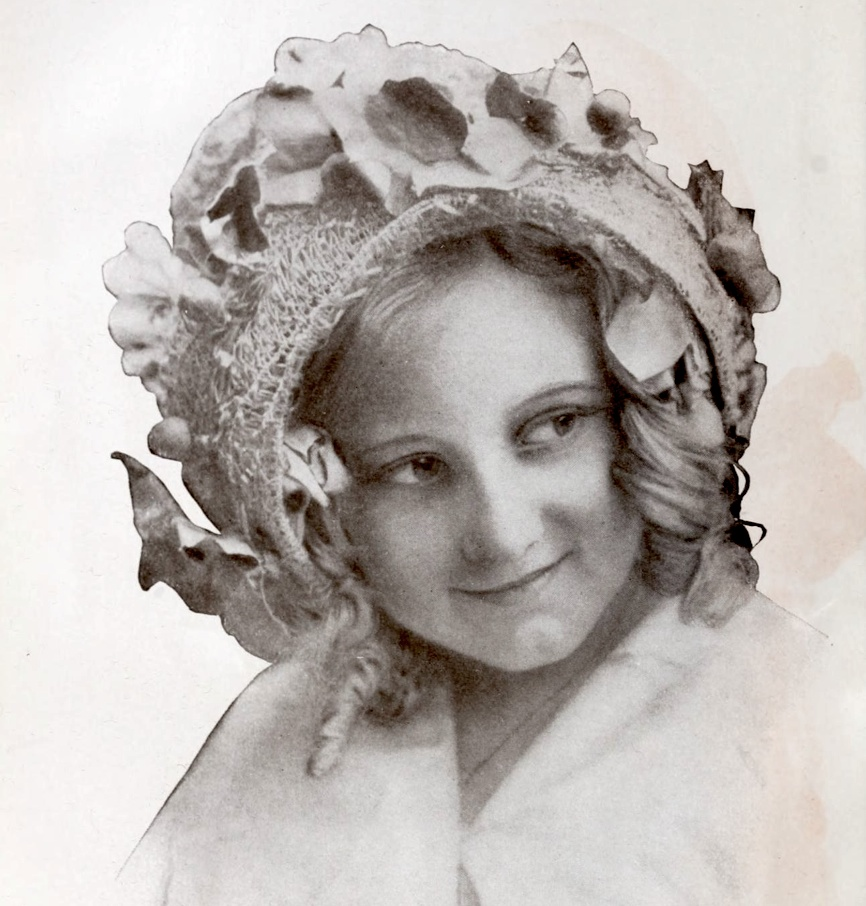
Clara Horton, for Eclair, in 1914.

Clara Marie Horton (July 29, 1904 – December 4, 1976) was an American actress of the silent film era.

Horton was born in Brooklyn. Her mother gave up a career as a piano soloist and instructor to raise her baby. She planned for Clara to have a career as a pianist and began teaching her when she had to lift the girl to the piano bench. When Clara was five years old, however, a director employed by the Eclair Company saw the girl and asked her mother to let her appear in a film. Her mother signed a contract, and the Hortons moved to Tucson, Arizona. When Eclair went out of business, they moved to Los Angeles, where work with other studios was available. She appeared in more than 80 films between 1912 and 1942.

When Horton was 17, she got married and left the film business. The marriage did not last, and she returned to working in films. She joined the Warner stock company and as of 1934 she was playing bit parts and was a stand-in for stars.

After her work in films ended, Horton was a saleslady in Whittier, California. She is buried in Rose Hills Memorial Park.

== Selected filmography ==
Year	Title	Role	Notes
1912	The Homecoming	Little Miss Langdon	
1912	Darling of the Mounted	The Darling	
1913	The Spectre Bridegroom	Master Van Altenberg	
1913	The Little Mother of Black Pine Trail	Marie	
1914	The Greatest of These	Peter's Little Friend	
1914	The Violinist	Ethel, age 7	
1915	The Little Band of Gold		
1915	The Vengeance of Guido		
1916	Under the Lion's Paw		
1916	Us Kids		
1917	The Plow Woman	Mary, as a child	
1917	Tom Sawyer	Becky Thatcher	
1918	Huck and Tom	Becky Thatcher	
1918	The Yellow Dog	Kate Cummings	
1919	The Winning Girl	Vivian Milligan	Lost film
1919	The Girl from Outside	June Campbell	
1919	Everywoman	Youth	Lost film
1919	Almost a Husband	Jane Sheldon	Lost film
1920	The Little Shepherd of Kingdom Come	Margaret	Lost film
1920	Blind Youth	Bobo	
1921	The Servant in the House	Mary, The Drain Man's Daughter	Lost film
1921	Action	Molly Casey	Alternative title: Let's Go, Lost film
1922	Penrod	Marjorie Jones	Lost film
1923	Mind Over Motor	Bettina Bailey	
1923	Judy Punch	Judy Wilcox	
1924	Wrongs Righted		
1925	Speed Madness	Alice Carey	
1925	The Wheel	Nora Malone	Lost film
1925	All Around Frying Pan	Jean Dawson	
1925	Makers of Men	Lillian Gilman	
1926	The Broadway Gallant	Helen Stuart	
1926	Beyond the Trail	Clarabell Simpkins	
1927	The Fortune Hunter	Betty Graham	Lost film
1927	Sailor Izzy Murphy	Cecile	Lost film
1936	Bengal Tiger	Hospital Secretary	Uncredited
1938	Girls on Probation	Prisoner	Uncredited
1942	Who Is Hope Schuyler?	Secretary	Uncredited
1942	Time to Kill	Maid	Uncredited
