= The Fifty-Fifty Girl =

1928 film directed by Clarence Badger

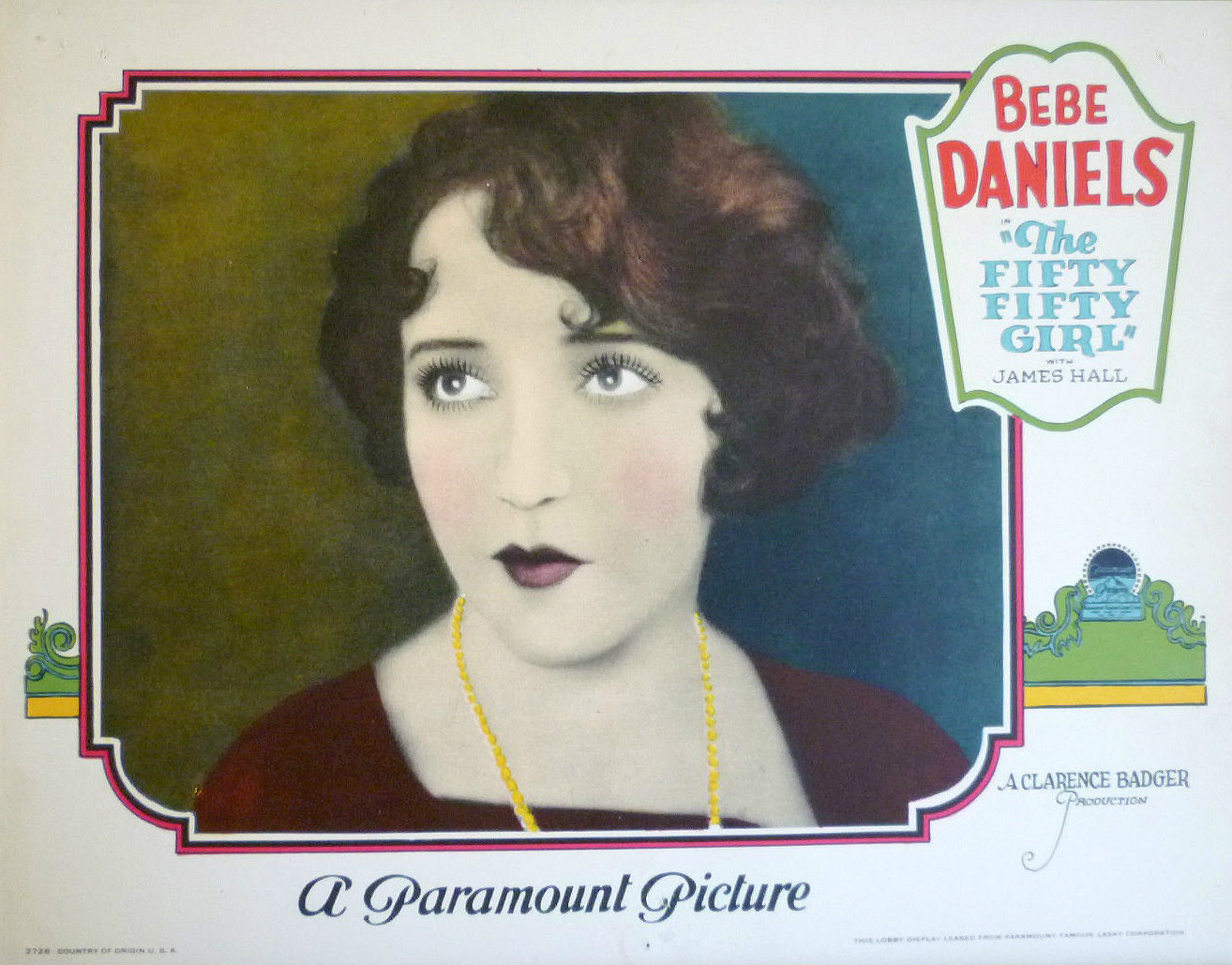
- Lobby card
- Directed by: Clarence Badger
- Written by: Lloyd Corrigan (adaptation); Ethel Doherty
- Story by: John McDermott
- Produced by: Adolph Zukor; Jesse Lasky
- Starring: Bebe Daniels
- Cinematography: J. Roy Hunt
- Distributed by: Paramount Pictures
- Release date: May 12, 1928
- Running time: 70 minutes
- Country: United States
- Language: Silent (English intertitles)

The Fifty-Fifty Girl is a lost 1928 American silent comedy film directed by Clarence Badger and starring Bebe Daniels and James Hall as co-owners of a gold mine.

== Cast ==
- Bebe Daniels as Kathleen O'Hara
- James Hall as Jim Donahue
- Harry T. Morey as Arnold Morgan
- William Austin as Engineer
- George Kotsonaros as Buck
- Johnnie Morris as Oscar, a thug
- Alfred Allen as Kathleen's Uncle
- Jack O'Hara
- Constantine Romanoff (uncredited)

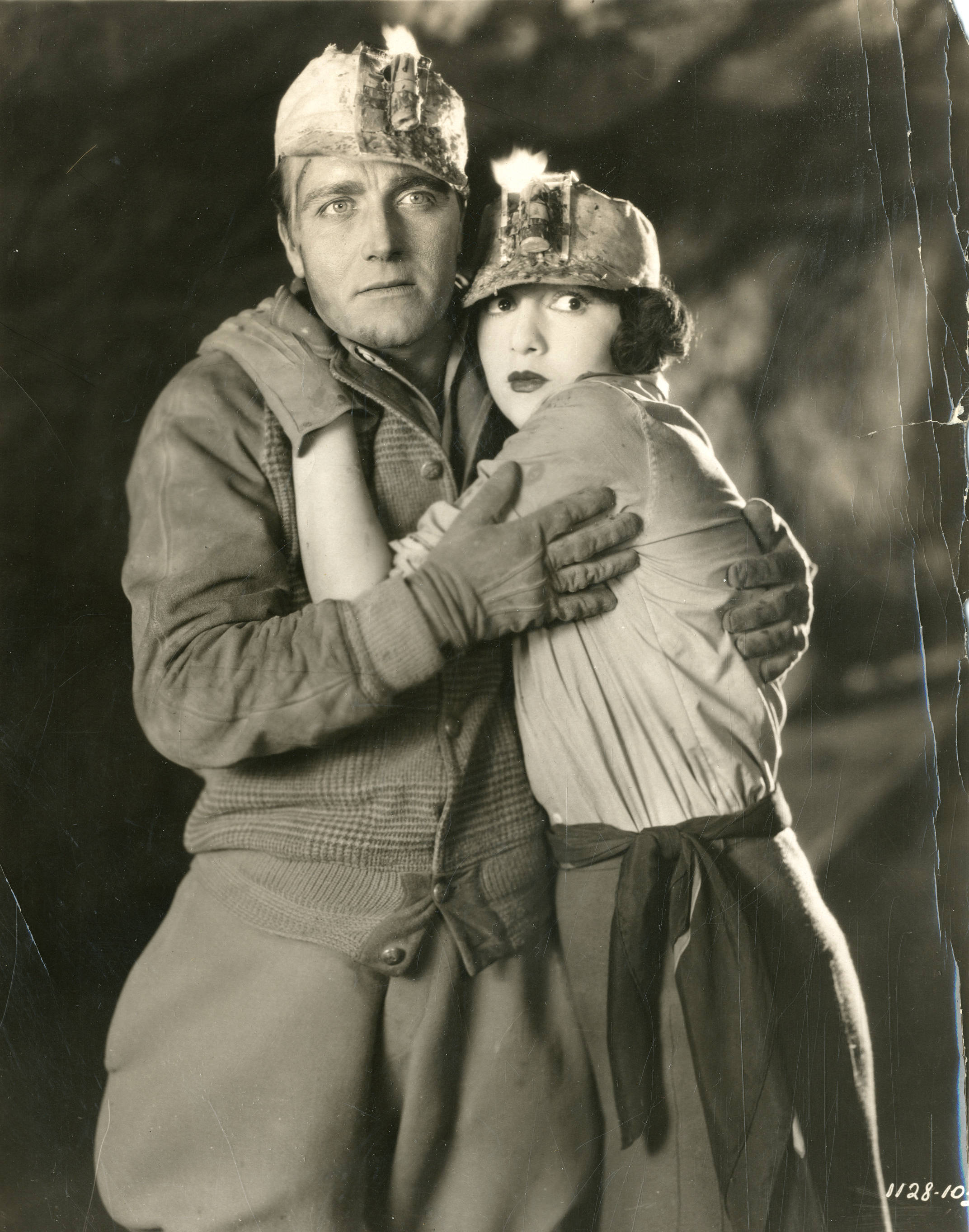
Scene from the movie
