= Wildcat Jordan =

1922 film

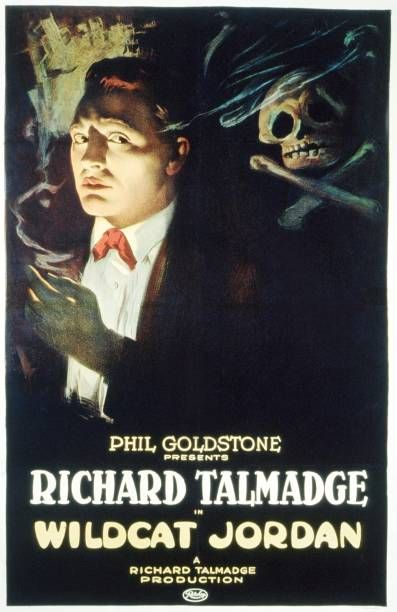
- Directed by: Alfred Santell
- Produced by: Phil Goldstone
- Starring: Richard Talmadge; Eugenia Gilbert; Harry von Meter
- Cinematography: Harry M. Fowler
- Production company: Phil Goldstone Productions
- Release date: July 1, 1922
- Running time: 50 minutes
- Country: United States
- Languages: Silent; English intertitles

Wildcat Jordan is a 1922 American silent comedy action film directed by Alfred Santell and starring Richard Talmadge, Eugenia Gilbert and Harry von Meter.

== Cast ==
- Richard Talmadge as Dick Jordan
- Eugenia Gilbert as Sylvia Grant
- Harry von Meter as Roger Gale
- Jack Waltemeyer as Billy Talbot

== Bibliography ==
- Rainey, Buck. Those Fabulous Serial Heroines: Their Lives and Films. Scarecrow Press, 1990.
