= Savages of the Sea =

1925 film

- Directed by: Bruce Mitchell
- Written by: William E. Wing
- Produced by: Bud Barsky
- Starring: Frank Merrill; Melbourne MacDowell; Marguerite Snow
- Cinematography: E.M. MacManigal
- Edited by: Grace Harrison
- Production company: Hercules Film Productions
- Distributed by: Bud Barsky Corporation
- Release date: February 17, 1925
- Running time: 50 minutes
- Country: United States
- Languages: Silent; English intertitles

Savages of the Sea is a 1925 American silent action film directed by Bruce Mitchell and starring Frank Merrill, Melbourne MacDowell and Marguerite Snow. It was produced by independent Bud Barsky as a supporting feature.

== Synopsis ==
Yacht owner Daniel Rawley, his ward Stella and a stowaway Saunders are shipwrecked in the South Seas. They are rescued by a ship run by a tyrannical captain.

== Cast ==
- Frank Merrill as Silent Saunders
- Melbourne MacDowell as Daniel Rawley
- Marguerite Snow as Stella Rawley
- Danny Hoy as Ginger
- Clarence Burton as Black Brock

== Bibliography ==
- Connelly, Robert B. The Silents: Silent Feature Films, 1910-36, Volume 40, Issue 2. December Press, 1998.
- Munden, Kenneth White. The American Film Institute Catalog of Motion Pictures Produced in the United States, Part 1. University of California Press, 1997.
