= Bud Barsky =

Ukrainian-born film producer (1891–1967)

Isidor "Bud" Barsky
- Born: June 19, 1891; Odesa, Kherson Governorate, Russian Empire
- Died: December 18, 1967 (aged 76); Westwood, California, United States
- Other name: Isador J. Barsky
- Occupations: Producer, Writer
- Years active: 1923–1937

Isidor "Bud" Barsky (June 19, 1891 – December 18, 1967) was a screenwriter and film producer active mainly during the silent era.

== Biography and career ==
Born in Ukraine in what was then part of the Russian Empire, he emigrated to the United States as a young man and grew up in New York. At age 15, he toured Alaska's gold fields with a musical troupe. During the First World War, he served in the Signal Corps. He founded the eponymous Bud Barsky Corporation in 1924, which concentrated mainly on action and western films. He also directed one film, The Coast Patrol, in 1925. In the 1930s he was the general manager of Columbia Pictures, and he was a producer at MGM, Warner Bros., and Grand National. He died at the UCLA Medical Center in 1967.

== Selected filmography ==
- Slow as Lightning (1923)
- South of the Equator (1924)
- Pride of Sunshine Alley (1924)
- The Coast Patrol (1925)
- Savages of the Sea (1925)
- The Speed Demon (1925)
- Makers of Men (1925)
- He Who Laughs Last (1925)
- The Law of the Snow Country (1926)
- Blue Streak O'Neil (1926)
- The Roaring Road (1926)
- The Fighting Ranger (1926)
- Shadows of Chinatown (1926)
- Rider of the Law (1927)
- Roaring Guns (1927)
- The Star Witness (1931)
- Wallaby Jim of the Islands (1937)

== Bibliography ==
- Slide, Anthony. The New Historical Dictionary of the American Film Industry. Routledge, 2014. ISBN 978-1578860159
