= A Fighting Heart =

1924 film directed by Jack Nelson

- Directed by: Jack Nelson
- Written by: Jack Nelson
- Starring: Frank Merrill; Margaret Landis; Otto Lederer
- Production company: Hercules Film Productions
- Distributed by: Bud Barsky Corporation
- Release date: July 28, 1924
- Running time: 60 minutes
- Country: United States
- Languages: Silent; English intertitles

A Fighting Heart is a 1924 American silent action film directed by Jack Nelson and starring Frank Merrill, Margaret Landis and Otto Lederer.

== Cast ==
- Frank Merrill as Jack Melford
- Margaret Landis as Rae Davis
- Milburn Morante as Cloudy Day
- May Sherman as Julia Cunningham
- Otto Lederer as Dr. Logan
- Alphonse Martell as Dr. Dehli
- Cathleen Calhoun as Blanche Renault

== Bibliography ==
- Connelly, Robert B. The Silents: Silent Feature Films, 1910-36, Volume 40, Issue 2. December Press, 1998.
- Munden, Kenneth White. The American Film Institute Catalog of Motion Pictures Produced in the United States, Part 1. University of California Press, 1997.
