= The Valley of Bravery =

1926 film

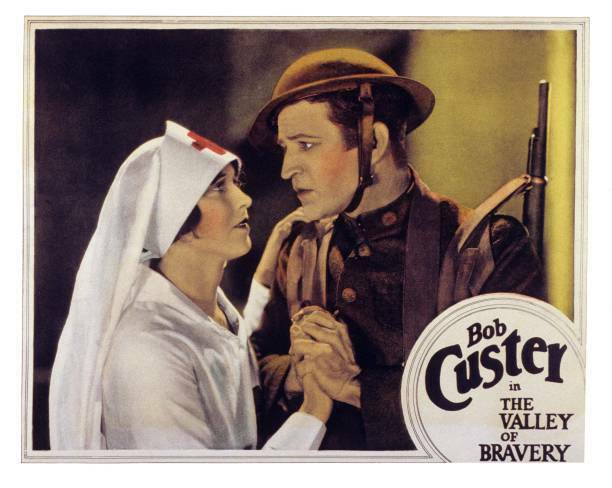
- Directed by: Jack Nelson
- Written by: E. Lanning Masters; Carl Krusada; James Ormont
- Produced by: Jesse J. Goldburg
- Starring: Bob Custer; Eugenia Gilbert; Artie Ortego
- Cinematography: Ernest Miller
- Production company: Independent Pictures
- Distributed by: Film Booking Offices of America
- Release date: May 16, 1926
- Running time: 50 minutes
- Country: United States
- Languages: Silent; English intertitles

The Valley of Bravery is a lost 1926 American silent Western film directed by Jack Nelson and starring Bob Custer, Eugenia Gilbert and Artie Ortego.

== Synopsis ==
Two veterans of World War I return home and help a young woman fend off a man who is trying to steal her ranch.

== Cast ==
- Bob Custer as Steve Tucker
- Tom Bay as Jim Saunders
- Eugenia Gilbert as Helen Coburn
- William Gillespie as Percy Winthrop
- Ernie Adams as Valet
- Artie Ortego as Joe
- Nelson McDowell as Missouri
- Bobby Nelson as Young Boy

== Preservation ==
With no holdings located in archives, The Valley of Bravery is considered a lost film.

== Bibliography ==
- Munden, Kenneth White. The American Film Institute Catalog of Motion Pictures Produced in the United States, Part 1. University of California Press, 1997.
