= The Man from Blankley's =

1930 film

- Theatrical release poster
- Directed by: Alfred E. Green
- Written by: Harvey F. Thew
- Screenplay by: Joseph Jackson (and titles)
- Based on: The Man from Blankley's (1903 play) by "F. Anstey" (Thomas Anstey Guthrie)
- Starring: John Barrymore; Loretta Young; William Austin; Albert Gran
- Cinematography: James Van Trees
- Production company: Warner Bros. Pictures
- Distributed by: Warner Bros. Pictures
- Release date: March 28, 1930 (US)
- Running time: 67 minutes
- Country: United States
- Language: English
- Budget: $422,000
- Box office: $358,000

The Man from Blankley's is a lost 1930 American pre-Code comedy film, directed by Alfred E. Green. It starred John Barrymore and Loretta Young. The film was based on the 1903 play by Thomas Anstey Guthrie, writing under the pseudonym "F. Anstey". The film was Barrymore's second feature length all-talking film. A previous silent film version of Anstey's play by Paramount Pictures appeared in 1920 as The Fourteenth Man starring Robert Warwick. That version is also lost.

== Plot ==
The trouble begins when Lord Strathpeffer, who is on his way to visit an Egyptologist with a case of instruments used by entomologists, loses his way in the fog and wanders into the wrong home. Mr. and Mrs. Tidmarsh, a middle-class English couple, are giving a dinner party in honor of their wealthy uncle, Gabriel Gilwattle, hoping to receive his financial aid in their struggle to keep up appearances.

As a result of many of the invitees informing Mrs. Tidmarsh that they could not attend her party, she believes that only 13 guests will show up. As Gilwattle is a superstitious man, Mrs. Tidmarsh sends to the Blankley Employment Agency to send them a distinguished looking man to serve as a guest. In the meantime, some other guests inform Fitzroy that they won't be able to come and the hired man is no longer needed. She informs the agency that the man is no longer needed. Nevertheless, when Barrymore arrives at the door, they automatically assume that he was sent by the agency and invite him in to dinner.

Mayhem ensues. Margery Seaton, one of the dinner guests, recognizes Barrymore as a former lover, and therefore assumes him to be an impostor. Sobering, Strathpeffer realizes he has come to the wrong party and asserts his right to his title; but Gwennie hides her father's watch in Strathpeffer's pocket as he is renewing his romance with Margery. A police inspector arrives hunting for the missing lord, establishing his authenticity and the fact that he is not, after all, the hired guest.

== Cast ==
- John Barrymore as Lord Strathpeffer
- Loretta Young as Margery Seaton
- William Austin as Mr. Poffley
- Albert Gran as Uncle Gabriel Gilwattle
- Emily Fitzroy as Mrs. Tidmarsh
- Yorke Sherwood as Mr. Bodfish
- Dale Fuller as Miss Flinders
- D'Arcy Corrigan as Mr. Ditchwater
- Louise Carver as Mrs Gilwattle
- Dick Henderson as Mr. Tidmarsh
- Edgar Norton as Dawes
- Diana Hope as Mrs. Bodfish
- May Milloy as Mrs. Ditchwater
- Angella Mawby as Gwennie
- Gwendolyn Logan as Maid
- Sybil Grove as Maid

== 1903 play ==
The play premiered in London in 1903 at the Prince of Wales Theatre and was revived in 1906 at the Haymarket Theatre to much success. It played on Broadway at the Criterion Theatre, from September 16 to November 1903, for 79 performances, before playing in Washington DC, Detroit and Chicago. It starred the British actors Sir Charles Hawtrey, Arthur Playfair and Faith Stone.

== Reception ==
=== Box office ===
According to Warner Bros. records, the film earned $311,000 in the U.S. and $47,000 in other markets.

=== Critical ===
The Outlook and Independent praised the film, stating that Barrymore had "reverted to type" and contributed in making a film that was a "highly entertaining and fantastic farse" and "one of the strangest and most delightfully insane comedies to reach the screen in years".

== Preservation ==
The film is now considered to be a lost film. It was not available for television in the 1950s when Warners prepared many of their early talkies for 16mm acquisition by Associated Artists Productions. The soundtrack survives on Vitaphone discs, but all visual elements (print, negative, trailers and outtakes) are believed to be lost, with the exception of photographs (or stills) taken on the set during production. In December 1967, this film was included to AFI's "rescue list".

== See also ==
- List of lost films
- List of incomplete or partially lost films
