= Unknown Dangers =

1926 American silent comedy action film

- Directed by: Grover Jones
- Written by: Grover Jones
- Produced by: Peter Kanellos
- Starring: Frank Merrill; Gloria Grey; Eddie Boland
- Production company: Hercules Film Productions
- Distributed by: Independent Film Corporation; Ideal Films (UK)
- Release date: April 15, 1926
- Running time: 50 minutes
- Country: United States
- Languages: Silent; English intertitles

Unknown Dangers is a 1926 comedy action film directed by Grover Jones and starring Frank Merrill, Gloria Grey and Eddie Boland.

== Cast ==
- Frank Merrill as Frank Carter
- Gloria Grey as Corliss McHenry
- Eddie Boland as David Parker
- Marcin Asher
- Emily Gerdes
- Theodore Lorch

== Bibliography ==
- Connelly, Robert B. The Silents: Silent Feature Films, 1910-36, Volume 40, Issue 2. December Press, 1998.
- Munden, Kenneth White. The American Film Institute Catalog of Motion Pictures Produced in the United States, Part 1. University of California Press, 1997.
