= Half Way to Heaven (1929 film) =

1929 film

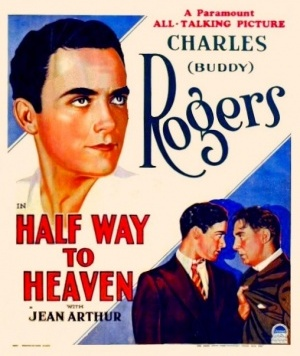
- Theatrical release poster
- Directed by: George Abbott
- Screenplay by: George Abbott; Henry Leyford Gates; Gerald Geraghty
- Starring: Charles "Buddy" Rogers; Jean Arthur; Paul Lukas; Helen Ware; Oscar Apfel; Irving Bacon
- Cinematography: Alfred Gilks; Charles Lang
- Edited by: William Shea
- Music by: Gene Lucas
- Production company: Paramount Pictures
- Distributed by: Paramount Pictures
- Release date: December 14, 1929
- Running time: 66 minutes
- Country: United States
- Language: English

Half Way to Heaven (1929)

Half Way to Heaven is a 1929 American Pre-Code drama film directed by George Abbott and written by Abbott, Henry Leyford Gates, and Gerald Geraghty. The film stars Charles "Buddy" Rogers, Jean Arthur, Paul Lukas, Helen Ware, Oscar Apfel, and Irving Bacon. The film was released on December 14, 1929, by Paramount Pictures. As was common during the early years of sound before dubbing became more established, several multiple-language versions were produced at the Joinville Studios in Paris including a Swedish-language version Half Way to Heaven.

== Cast ==
- Charles "Buddy" Rogers as Ned Lee
- Jean Arthur as Greta Nelson
- Paul Lukas as Nick Pogli
- Helen Ware as Madame Elsie
- Oscar Apfel as Circus Manager
- Irving Bacon as Slim
- Al Hill as Blackie
- Guy Oliver as Farmer at Railroad Station
- Ford West as Stationmaster

== See also ==
- List of early sound feature films (1926–1929)
