= Olaf—An Atom =

1913 film

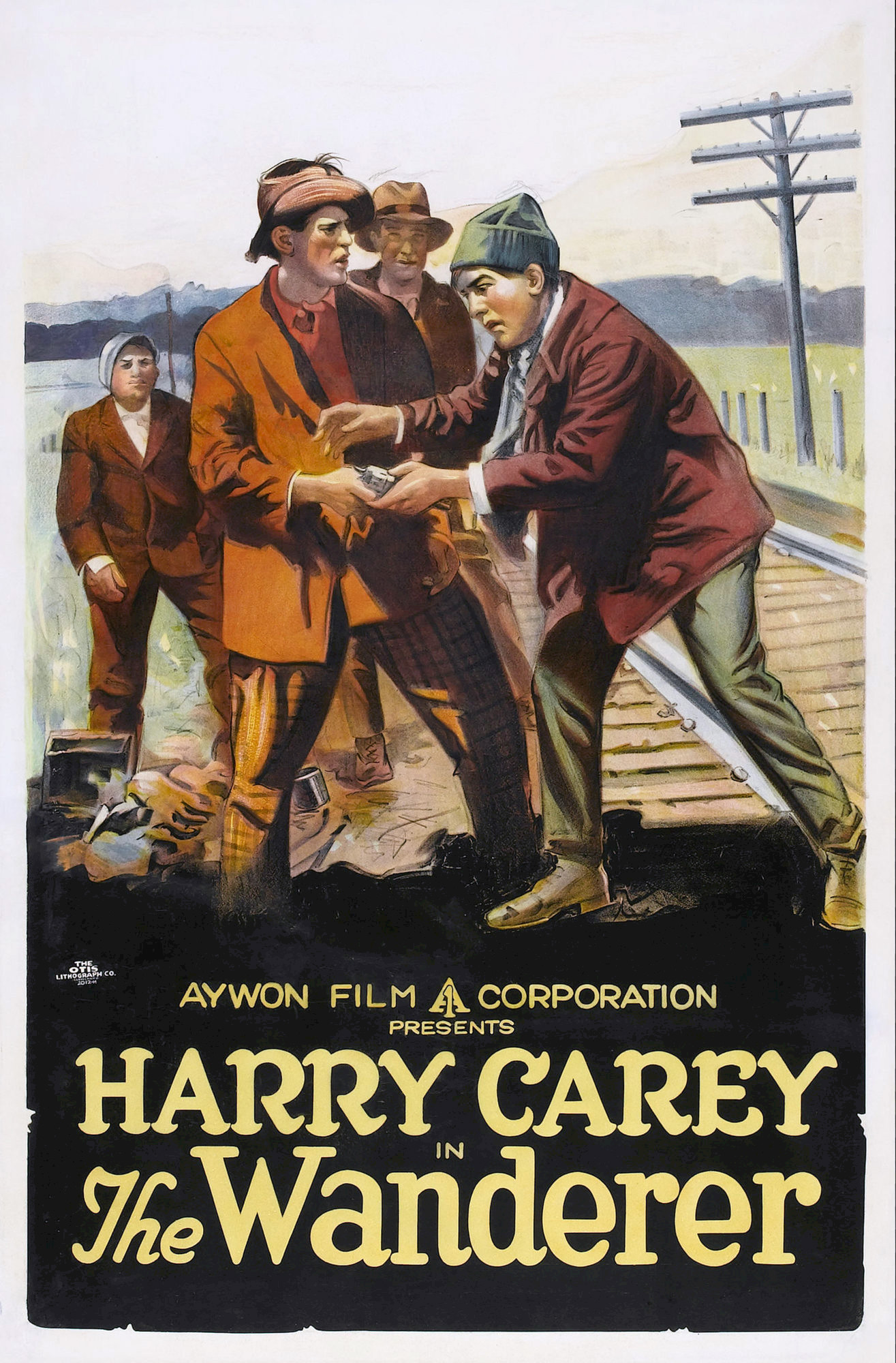
- Aywon Film Corporation re-release poster for the film, retitled The Wanderer
- Directed by: Anthony O'Sullivan
- Written by: William E. Wing
- Starring: Harry Carey
- Cinematography: G. W. Bitzer
- Production company: Biograph Company
- Release date: May 19, 1913
- Running time: 17 minutes (16 frame/s); 1,003 feet
- Country: United States
- Language: Silent with English intertitles

Olaf—An Atom is a 1913 American film directed by Anthony O'Sullivan and featuring Harry Carey.

== Plot ==
Broken by grief after his mother's death, Olaf becomes a wanderer. He is treated cruelly until he is given a meal by a woman at the homestead where she lives with her husband and baby. Olaf is able to return her kindness when he overhears a plot to rob the settlers of their home. He alerts the couple and delays the would-be thieves long enough for the husband to file a claim on his land. Olaf is injured by the claim jumpers but he recovers, alone and forgotten by those he has helped. He then moves aimlessly along.

== Cast ==
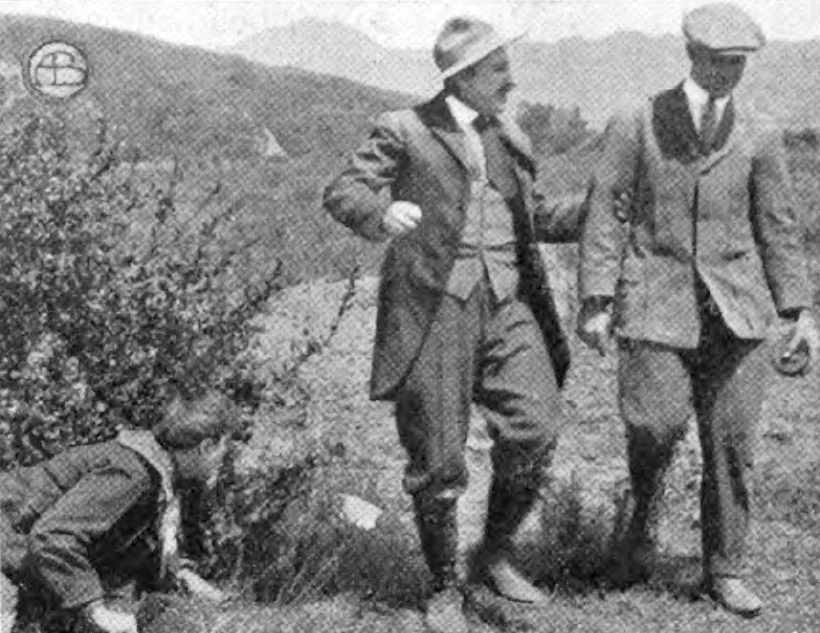
Olaf (Harry Carey, left) overhears a plot to seize the homestead of a couple that has been kind to him.

- Harry Carey as Olaf
- Kate Bruce as Olaf's Mother
- Charles Hill Mailes as A Parent
- Claire McDowell as A Parent
- Donald Crisp as The Beggar
- Frank Evans as The Blacksmith
- John T. Dillon as The Claim Jumper
- Thomas Jefferson as The Doctor (unconfirmed)

== Production ==
Directed by Anthony O'Sullivan and written by William E. Wing, Olaf—An Atom was produced by the Biograph Company and released May 19, 1913, in the United States. The drama was released August 4, 1913, in the United Kingdom.

The film was retitled The Wanderer and re-released by the Aywon Film Corporation, a New York City company formed in early 1919. Aywon reissued films including the Biograph Company short films, which were often lengthened by the addition of intertitles.

== See also ==
- Harry Carey filmography
