= Eddie Boland =

American actor (1885–1935)

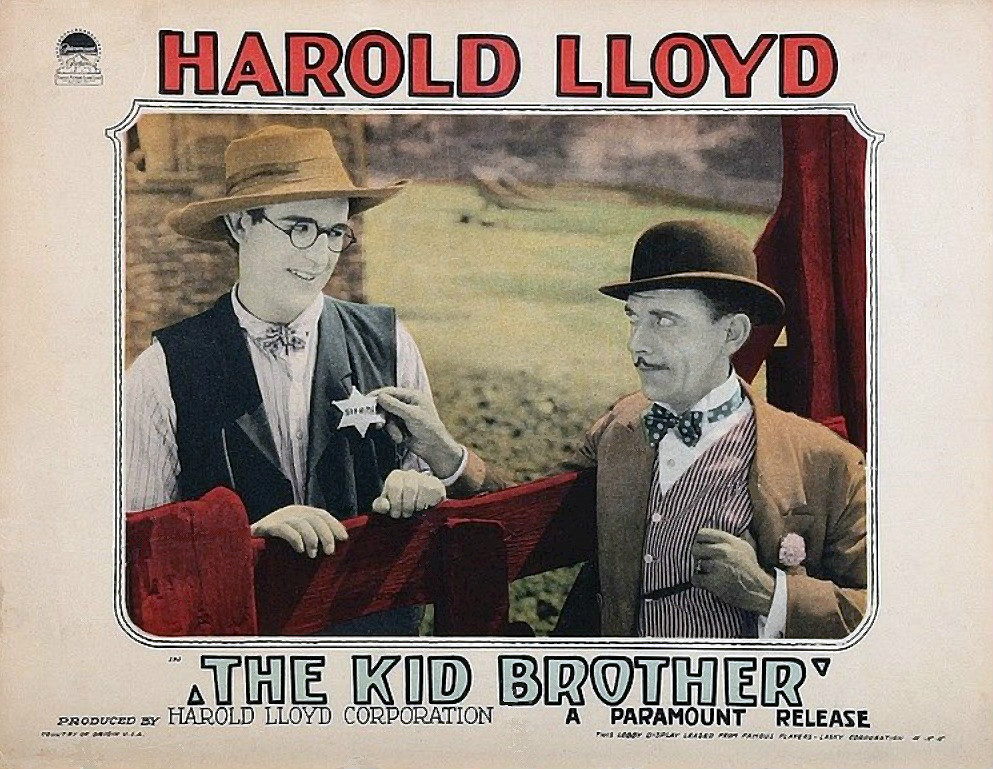
- Lobby card from The Kid Brother (1927) with Harold Lloyd and Eddie Boland
- Born: December 27, 1885; San Francisco, California
- Died: February 3, 1935 (aged 49); Santa Monica, California
- Years active: 1912–1935

Eddie Boland (December 27, 1885 – February 3, 1935) was an American film actor. He appeared in more than 110 films from 1912 to 1937, mostly in comedic supporting roles. Among his best-known roles were "The Obliging Gentleman" in F. W. Murnau's silent film Sunrise: A Song of Two Humans (1927) and a criminal showman in the Harold Lloyd comedy The Kid Brother (1927). He was born in San Francisco and died in Santa Monica, California from a heart attack.

== Filmography ==
Year	Title	Role	Notes
1914	Lucille Love, Girl of Mystery	Government Aviator	Lost film
1914	The Mysterious Rose	Yeen Kee	short Lost film
1919	Don't Shove		short
1920	All Lit Up	The Drunk	
1920	Thoughtless Women	Mr. Marnet	Lost film
1920	Greek Meets Greek		Lost film
1922	Oliver Twist	Toby Crackit	
1923	Within the Law	Darcy	
1923	Long Live the King	Chief Guard	
1924	Little Robinson Crusoe	Wireless Operator	
1925	A Gentleman Roughneck		Lost film
1926	Unknown Dangers	David Parker	Lost film
1926	Hard Boiled	Second Crook	Lost film
1927	The Kid Brother	'Flash' Farrell	
1927	Sunrise: A Song of Two Humans	The Obliging Gentleman	
1928	Manhattan Knights	Chick Watson	Lost film
1929	The Last Performance	Agent	
1930	City Girl	Reaper	uncredited
1930	Wings of Adventure	Viva	
1931	The Lightning Flyer	Slats	
1931	The Miracle Woman	Collins	
1931	The Guilty Generation	Willie	
1932	Murder at Dawn	Freddie	
1932	Vanity Street	Joe	
1932	The Death Kiss	Bill	uncredited
1932	The Secrets of Wu Sin	Eddie Morgan	uncredited
1933	King Kong	Reporter / Cameraman	uncredited
1933	I Have Lived	Sidney Cook	
1933	Flying Down to Rio	Airplane Mechanic	uncredited
1933	The Cat's-Paw	Photographer	uncredited
1937	Hit the Saddle	Pete	
