= The Fighting Doctor =

1926 film

- Directed by: Robert N. Bradbury
- Written by: Grover Jones
- Produced by: Peter Kanellos
- Starring: Frank Merrill; Edward Cecil; George Kotsonaros
- Cinematography: Bert Longenecker; Ernest F. Smith
- Production company: Hercules Film Productions
- Distributed by: Hercules Film Productions
- Release date: July 1, 1926
- Running time: 50 minutes
- Country: United States
- Languages: Silent; English intertitles

The Fighting Doctor is a 1926 action film directed by Robert N. Bradbury and starring Frank Merrill, Edward Cecil and George Kotsonaros.

== Cast ==
- Frank Merrill as Dr. Frank Martin
- Edward Cecil as George Stafford
- J.C. Fowler as Malcolm Sanders
- George Kotsonaros as Scissors Lomski, the Bull from Montana
- Jack P. Pierce as 'Chug' Wilson
- Florence Ulrich as Susie Sanders
- Monty O'Grady as Little Boy

== Bibliography ==
- Connelly, Robert B. The Silents: Silent Feature Films, 1910-36, Volume 40, Issue 2. December Press, 1998.
- Munden, Kenneth White. The American Film Institute Catalog of Motion Pictures Produced in the United States, Part 1. University of California Press, 1997.
