= Hair-Trigger Baxter =

1926 film

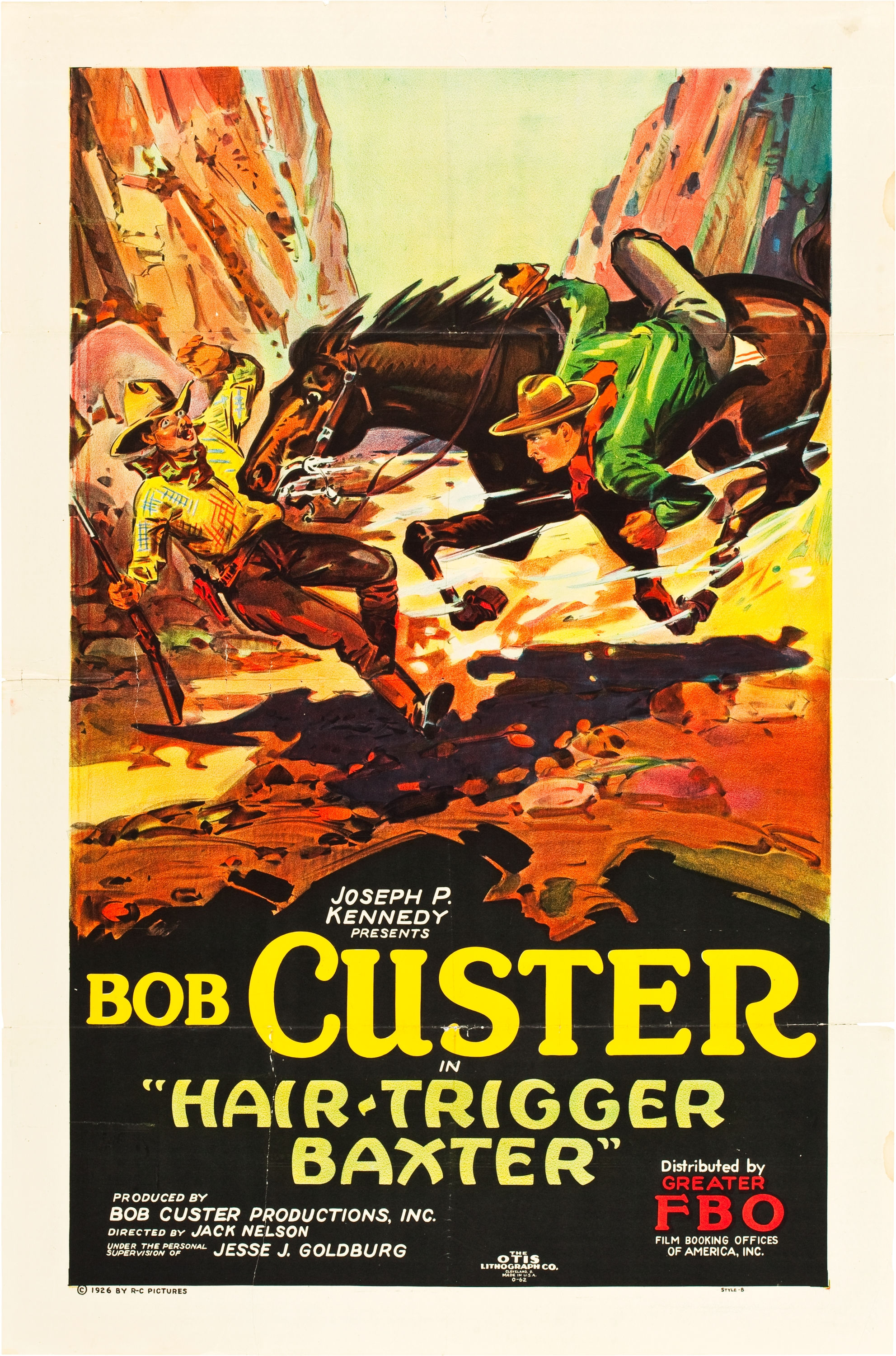
- Directed by: Jack Nelson
- Written by: Paul M. Bryan; James Ormont
- Produced by: Jesse J. Goldburg; Joseph P. Kennedy
- Starring: Bob Custer; Eugenia Gilbert; Lew Meehan
- Cinematography: Ernest Miller
- Production company: Independent Pictures
- Distributed by: Film Booking Offices of America; Ideal Films (UK)
- Release date: September 1926
- Running time: 50 minutes
- Country: United States
- Languages: Silent; English intertitles

Hair-Trigger Baxter is a 1926 American silent Western film directed by Jack Nelson and starring Bob Custer, Eugenia Gilbert and Lew Meehan.

== Cast ==
- Bob Custer as Baxter Brant
- Eugenia Gilbert as Rose Moss
- Lew Meehan as Mont Blake
- Murdock MacQuarrie as Joe Craddock
- Fanny Midgley as Mrs. Craddock
- Jim Corey as Jim Dodds
- Ernie Adams as Shorty Hillis
- Hugh Saxon as Silas Brant
