= The Wizard (1927 film) =

1927 film

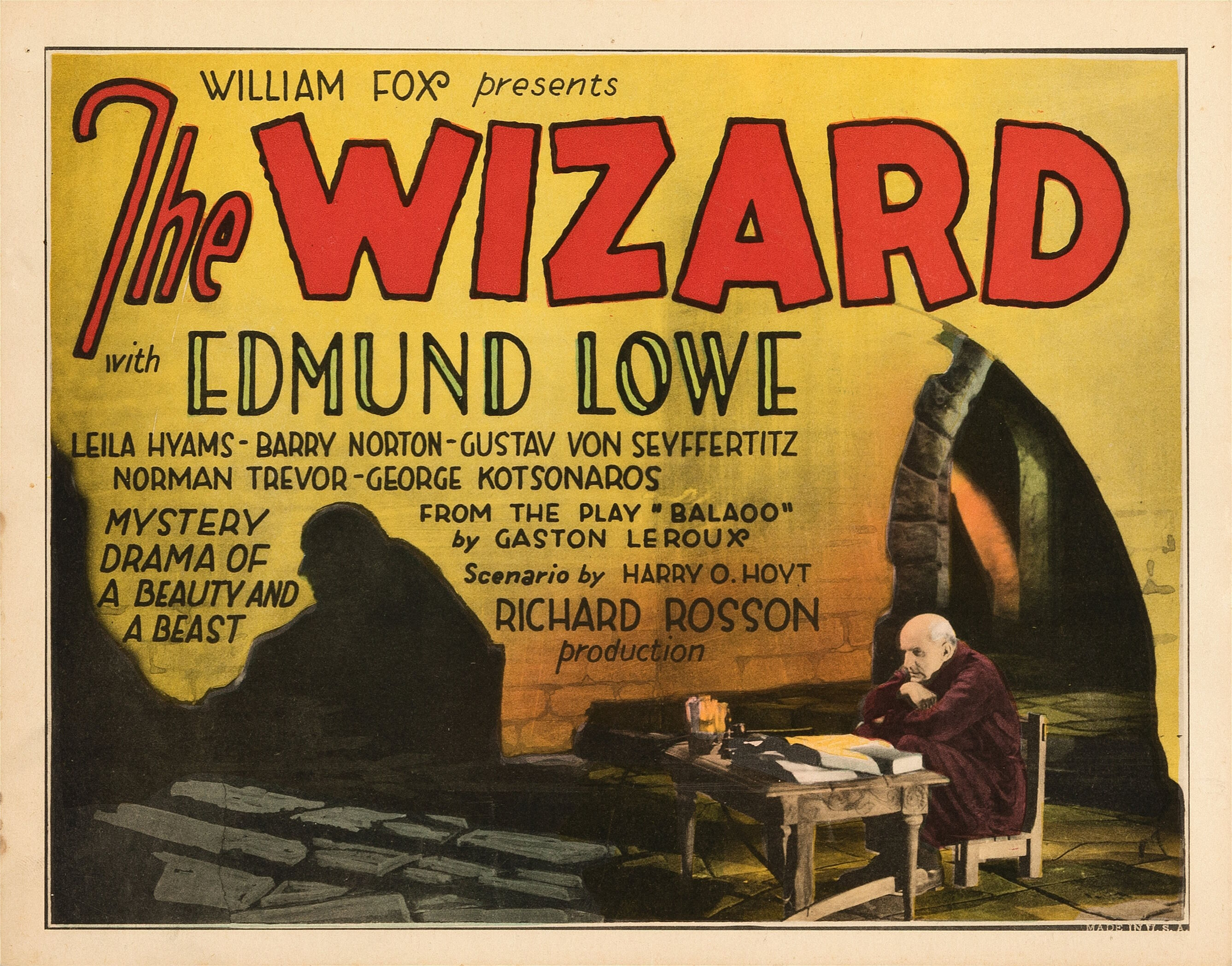
- Directed by: Richard Rosson
- Screenplay by: Harry O. Hoyt; Andrew Bennison
- Based on: Balaoo by Gaston Leroux
- Starring: Edmund Lowe; Leila Hyams; Gustav von Seyffertitz; E. H. Calvert; Barry Norton
- Cinematography: Frank Good
- Production company: Fox Film Corporation
- Release date: 27 October 1927 (New York)
- Country: United States

The Wizard is a lost 1927 American mystery film directed by Richard Rosson. The film is based on the 1911 story Balaoo by Gaston Leroux. The film is about Dr. Paul Coriolos who has grafted a human face onto an ape, and sends it out to capture people and bring them back to his home to be tortured and killed. Reporter Stanley Gordon is booked to a write-up on the mystery, and finds that Anne Webster and her father have been mysteriously disappeared from their dinner home. Gordon follows the clues to discover them at Coriolos's home.

The film received mixed reviews on its release and is now considered a lost film.

== Plot ==
As this is a lost film, the plot is adapted from a summary from Harrison's Reports.

Dr. Paul Coriolos who has grafted the face of a friend onto the face of an ape to make it appear like a human being. He teaches him to recognize the scent of things like cigars and perfume and then gives his victims cigars to smoke or spraying perfume on them to make them recognizable to the ape, who pulls his victims to Coriolos's home to be tortured and then killed.

Stanley Gordon, a reporter, is told to keep his job, he needs to get a report on these mysterious murders. Gordon tricks a Detective Murphy into handcuffing himself, while Gordon answers the phone calls to learn from Anne Webster’s father, Judge Webster, that a friend of his had disappeared from his house while at dinner, and requests this to be investigated.

Gordon then rushes to the Judge’s house to find the Judge and her daughter have been taken to Coriolo's home. Gordon suspects the criminologist and eventually brings to light the fact that he was the murderer and saves Webster and her father from a horrible death. Having enraged the ape, Coriolos is torn to pieces while Webster shoots and kills the ape just before he is about to attack Gordon.

== Cast ==
- Edmund Lowe as Stanley Gordon
- Leila Hyams as Anne Webster
- Gustav von Seyffertitz as Prof. Paul Coriolos
- E. H. Calvert as Edwin Palmer
- Barry Norton as Reginald Van Lear
- Oscar Smith as Sam
- Perlie Marshall as Detective Murphy
- Norman Trevor as Judge Webster
- George Kotsonaros as The Gorilla
- Maude Turner Gordon as Mrs. Van Lear

== Production ==
The Wizard was announced by the Los Angeles Times on November 7, 1927. It is adapted from Balaoo (1911) by Gaston Leroux. The story had previously been adapted by in 1913 as Balaoo, The Demon Baboon. The film was co-written by Harry O. Hoyt who had previously directed the film The Lost World (1925). Malcolm Stuart Boylan provided the intertitles.

In 1928, the Warren Tribune of Pennsylvania reviewed the film Something Always Happens (1928) and compared it The Bat (1926) and The Wizard (1927) and "other films of the same type" in an article titled "Horror Film Thrills Audience at Columbia." Rhodes noted that different descriptions were used for films like The Bat, The Wizard, and The Cat and the Canary (1927), but they were most commonly referred to as mystery films."

== Release ==
The Wizard premiered in New York on November 27, 1927. The film is considered a lost film.

Balaoo was adapted again in 1942 as Dr. Renault's Secret.

== Reception ==
The authors of American Silent Horror, Science Fiction and Fantasy Feature Films, 1913-1929 (2012) noted that the film received mixed reviews. Movie Picture World stated that the film "offers an excellent ensemble of high-class fantastic mystery, sometimes of the 'creepy' sort, with romance woven into the skein of things in liberal measure." and that the film was "quite from thee average run of 'mystery thrillers,' this one brings sustained interested coupled with laughs, excellent direction and a well told story." Sidne Silverman of Variety dismissed the film declaring it a "Silly and a waste of time" stating that "This picture hasn't got enough sense to it to even create an illusion of horror. All it can do is keep some imaginative youngers awake for a couple of nights." The Washington Post declared it "an especially eerie picture so packed with ominous episodes and appalling apparitions prowling around the home of a renegade scientist at midnight that nobody's nerves are safe." while Harrison's Reports declared the film "a thriller mystery melodrama" and "it was a 'wee bit' gruesome [...] Yet those who love stronger melodramas should get their life's enjoyment out of it." The New York Times wrote two reviews of the film, the first declaring it "quite a good entertainment weakened by the levity forced upon it [...] the subject really has enough of a story to deserve more serious treatment." The second review, from a week later declared that "This subject possesses some good ideas, but the comedy is a bit too low to suit the story."

Reviews commented on the acting in the film, with Edmund Lowe The New York Times stating he was "over-smiling" while Moving Picture World declared that the role "calls for nothing exceptional from him, brings out, nevertheless, all of the qualities for quick action and sudden fights that have endeared him to audiences throughout the world." Wrestler and actor George Kotsonaros, who specialized in roles with names like "battling Roff", Butch" and "Iron Mike" was described by Variety as giving "the best performance in the picture. He waddles, glowers, fights and gets shot." while the New York Times stated that Kotsonaros "does everything well".

== See also ==
- List of early color feature films
- List of lost films
- 1937 Fox vault fire
