= The Mysterious Airman =

1928 film

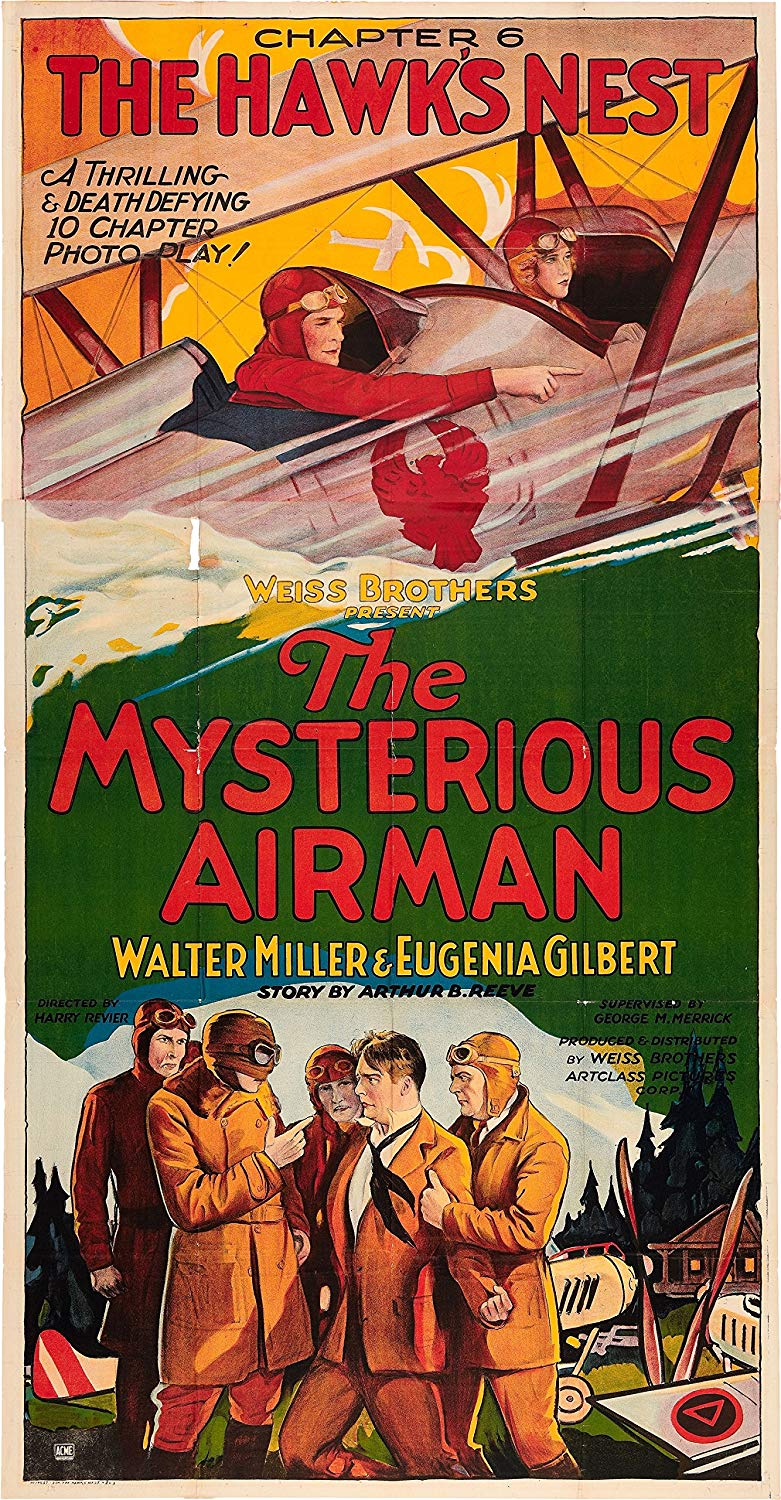
- Chapter 6 theatrical release poster
- Directed by: Harry Revier
- Written by: Arthur B. Reeve (story); Harry Revier (screenplay)
- Produced by: Louis Weiss
- Starring: Walter Miller; Eugenia Gilbert; Robert Walker
- Cinematography: Frank Kesson
- Edited by: Holbrook N. Todd
- Music by: Andrew Earle Simpson. (composer; original music performer)
- Production company: Weiss Brothers Artclass Pictures
- Distributed by: Weiss Brothers Artclass Pictures
- Release date: June 1, 1928 (U.S.)
- Running time: 10 chapters (185 minutes) (serial)
- Country: United States
- Language: Silent (English intertitles)

The Mysterious Airman (a.k.a. Mysterious Airman and The Mystery Airman ) is a 1928 American black-and-white 10-chapter silent film serial from Weiss Brothers Artclass Pictures. The serial involves a mysterious airman who is after the aviation inventions from a new aircraft company.The Mysterious Airman was one of the last Hollywood silent film serials and, until recently, thought to be a lost film.

== Plot ==
Jack Baker (Walter Miller) is an aviation engineer, pilot, and president of the Baker Aircraft Company. He has invented new aviation innovations to be mounted on his company's aircraft.

The owners of Globe Air Corporation, a rival aviation company, are after these new inventions. Their president, William Craft (Robert Walker), hires a masked and mysterious airman, known only as "Pilot X", who also makes plans to steal those inventions for his own use. He uses a trained monkey to steal one of them, a radio-controlled "flying torpedo", that was in engineer Baker's workshop. In the air, his gang of "Air Hawks" pose serious peril to the Baker Aircraft Company.

The attacks are largely aimed at stealing Baker's exclusive rights to the "Aerometer", invented by James B. Joyce (C. H. Allen), a new navigational instrument that makes flying safer in all sorts of weather, even at night. The inventor's daughter, Shirley (Eugenia Gilbert), is an aviatrix who is Baker's fiancée.

"World-famous aviatrix" Fawn Nesbitt (Dorothy Talcott), who hopes to become the first female pilot to fly around the world, becomes concerned when Baker's aircraft begin crashing. She is to be married to Albert Orren (Eugene Burr), the owner of a rival aircraft company.

As the air attacks mount, Baker and Shirley are in constant danger, both on the ground and above the clouds. Their efforts always seem to be known to the mysterious Pilot X, and suspicion falls on Perkins (Arthur Morrison), Joyce's butler, who is always nearby when plans are being discussed.

== Chapter titles ==
1. The Winged Avenger (16 minutes)
2. The Sky Writer (20 minutes)
3. The Girl Who Flew Alone (20 minutes)
4. The Smoke Screen (20 minutes)
5. Test Flight (20 minutes)
6. The Hawk's Nest (20 minutes)
7. The Faker Pilot (20 minutes)
8. The Air Raft (20 minutes)
9. The Hidden Hangar (20 minutes)
10. Mystery Pilot X (20 minutes)

== Cast ==
- Walter Miller as Jack Baker
- Eugenia Gilbert as Shirley Joyce
- Robert Walker as William Craft
- Eugene Burr as Albert Orren
- Dorothy Tallcot as Fawn Nesbitt
- James A. Fitzgerald as Barney Madden
- C.H. Allen as James Joyce
- Ray Childs as Henry Knight
- Hugh Blair as Detective Mullens
- Arthur Morrison as Perkins
- Hamilton Morse as Mardos Kartoff

== Production ==
The Mysterious Airman was written by famed mystery novelist Arthur B. Reeve of Craig Kennedy, Scientific Detective fame. The serial was the last silent serial produced by poverty row producers, the Weiss Brothers, and came at the end of the silent film era. Although production values were modest, a number of aircraft were featured, both on the ground and in the air. These aircraft included a Waco ATO, fitted with a machine gun and was flown by Pilot X.

== Reception ==
A modern appraisal of The Mysterious Airman was published in the Schenectady (NY) Gazette and notes that it is "Superior to the usual run of serials ... full of thrills ...”

== Preservation status ==
The Mysterious Airman was thought to be a “lost” silent film. In 2004, after producer Kit Parker (of Kit Parker Films) purchased the holdings of Weiss Global International, Parker was approached by film archivist Jeff Joseph of SabuCat Productions. Joseph offered to loan Parker his near-complete original 35mm tinted nitrate film print of the serial. His print was missing only the first reel of Chapter Nine, due to reel's decomposition.

Once restored (including recreating the missing reel from film stills and plot synopses) and digitally restored, (Note: a new piano score was commissioned from silent film accompanist Dr. Andrew Earle Simpson. Simpson is main accompanist of the Library of Congress (Packard Campus) in Culpeper, Virginia.) The Mysterious Airman was released October 17, 2017 on DVD by VCI Video (Sprocket Vault). Additional features include a commentary track by historian Richard M. Roberts, Flying Cadets (1928), a 2-reel United States Army Air Corps documentary film short, and a gallery of original The Mysterious Airman posters and lobby cards.

== See also ==
- List of film serials by year
- List of film serials by studio
