= The Swell-Head =

1927 film

- Directed by: Ralph Graves
- Written by: Robert Lord
- Produced by: Harry Cohn
- Starring: Ralph Graves; Johnnie Walker; Eugenia Gilbert
- Cinematography: Conrad Wells
- Production company: Columbia Pictures
- Distributed by: Columbia Pictures
- Release date: August 7, 1927
- Running time: 59 minutes
- Country: United States
- Language: Silent (English intertitles)

The Swell-Head is a lost 1927 American silent drama film directed by Ralph Graves and starring Graves, Johnnie Walker and Eugenia Gilbert.

== Cast ==
- Ralph Graves as Lefty Malone
- Johnnie Walker as Bill O'Rourke
- Eugenia Gilbert as Molly O'Rourke
- Mildred Harris as Kitty
- Mary Carr as Mother Malone
- Tom Dugan as Malone's Manager
