= Mind Over Motor =

1923 film

- Directed by: Ward Lascelle
- Written by: Bennett Cohen; H. Landers Jackson
- Produced by: Ward Lascelle
- Starring: Trixie Friganza; Ralph Graves; Clara Horton
- Production company: Ward Lascelle Productions
- Distributed by: Principal Distributing
- Release date: January 15, 1923
- Running time: 50 minutes
- Country: United States
- Languages: Silent; English intertitles

Mind Over Motor is a 1923 American silent comedy film directed by Ward Lascelle and starring Trixie Friganza, Ralph Graves and Clara Horton.

== Cast ==
- Trixie Friganza as Tish
- Ralph Graves as Jasper McCutcheon
- Clara Horton as Bettina Bailey
- Lucy Handforth as Lizzie
- Caroline Rankin as Aggie
- Grace Gordon as Marie
- Pietro Sosso as Officer
- George Guyton as Gardiner
- Mrs. Lee as Mother
- Larry Steers as Ellis
- Edward Hearn as Starter

== Bibliography ==
- Goble, Alan. The Complete Index to Literary Sources in Film. Walter de Gruyter, 1999.
