= The Kid Brother =

1927 silent comedy film

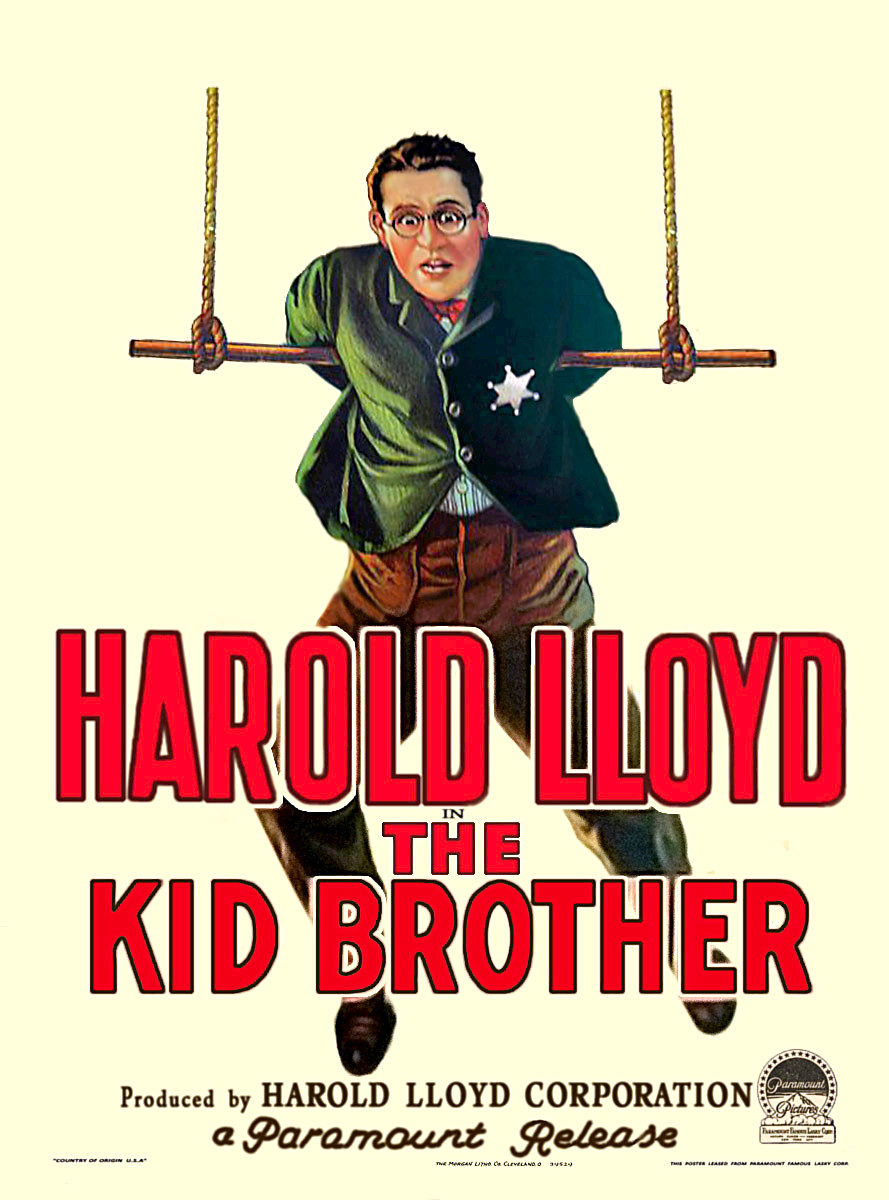
- The Kid Brother poster
- Directed by: Ted Wilde; J.A. Howe (co-director); Harold Lloyd (uncredited); Lewis Milestone (uncredited)
- Written by: Howard J. Green
- Produced by: Harold Lloyd
- Starring: Harold Lloyd; Jobyna Ralston
- Cinematography: Walter Lundin
- Edited by: Allen McNeil
- Distributed by: Paramount Pictures
- Release date: January 22, 1927 (U.S.)
- Running time: 84 minutes
- Country: United States
- Language: Silent (English intertitles)

The Kid Brother is a 1927 American silent comedy film starring Harold Lloyd. It was successful and popular upon release and today is considered by critics and fans to be one of Lloyd's best films, integrating elements of comedy, romance, drama, and character development. Its storyline is an homage to a 1921 film called Tol'able David, although it is essentially a re-make of the 1924 Hal Roach feature, The White Sheep, starring Glenn Tryon. The film entered the public domain in 2023.

== Plot ==
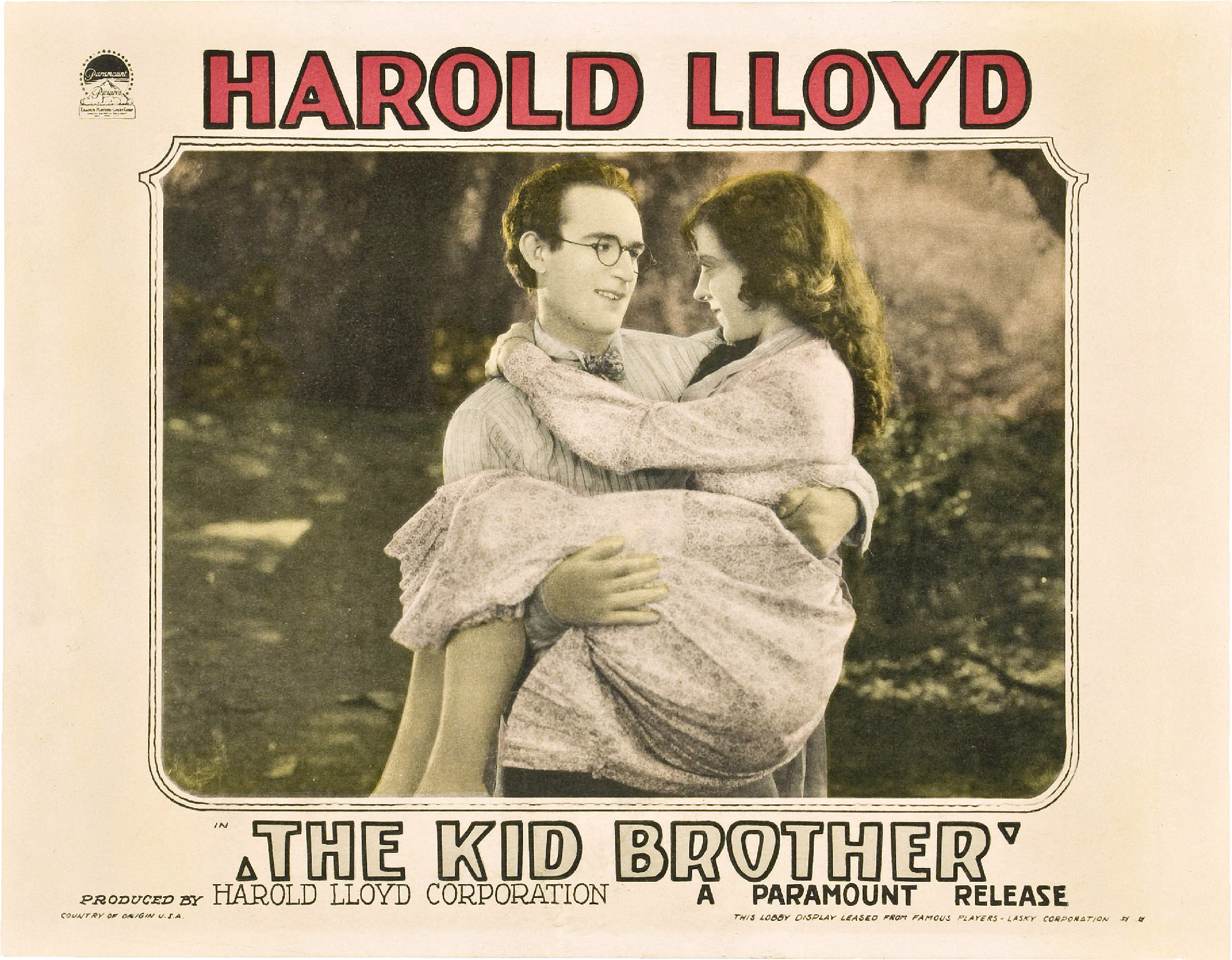
Harold and Mary

The Kid Brother (1927)

The Hickorys are a respected family in Hickoryville. Sheriff Jim and his big, strong sons Leo and Olin have little respect for the youngest son, Harold, who does not have their muscles.

When Jim, Leo and Olin go to an important town meeting to discuss a dam, Harold is left behind. He puts on his father's gun and badge and is mistaken for the sheriff by "Flash" Farrell, who runs a traveling medicine show for Mary after the death of her father. Farrell talks Harold into signing a permit to let him, strongman Sandoni and dancer Mary perform. Later, Mary tries to avoid the unwanted attentions of Sandoni and encounters Harold. They are attracted to each other.

When Jim finds out that Harold authorized the medicine show, he orders his son to shut down the performance. Harold tries, but Farrell makes a fool of him, then has him tied up. Harold's sworn enemy, Hank Hooper, pelts him and accidentally starts a fire that consumes the medicine show wagon. Harold invites Mary to spend the night in the family home. Jim is asleep, so Harold cannot get his permission, Harold has to use his wits to overcome the opposition of his brothers. However, Mrs. Hooper and her son Hank show up and take Mary with them, as it would not be decent for Mary to spend the night in a house without "womenfolk."

The next day is a town celebration, where Jim is supposed to turn over to a state official the funds raised by the residents to help build the dam. However, the money is gone. Jim strongly suspects Farrell and Sandoni of being responsible, but Sam Hooper accuses him of the theft and refuses to let him go after them. Jim sends Leo and Olin, but not Harold, after them. When they return empty-handed, Jim allows himself to be tied up. There is talk of lynching.

Harold confesses to Mary that he is not the person he pretended to be, but she tells him she has faith in him. Then Hank accuses her of being in on the robbery. Harold fights back when some men grab her, only to have Hank knock him out and set him adrift in a rowboat. He awakens after the boat reaches an abandoned, beached ship. Aboard he finds the real thieves. Sandoni disposes of Farrell after they argue over the division of the loot. Then the strongman spots Harold and chases him all over the ship. Eventually, Harold subdues Sandoni and races back to town with his prisoner and the money to save his father. An impressed Jim tells him, "Son, you're a real Hickory." As Harold and Mary walk away, they encounter Hank. Harold musters the courage to fight his longtime nemesis and beats him up.

== Cast ==
- Harold Lloyd as Harold Hickory
- Jobyna Ralston as Mary Powers
- Walter James as Jim Hickory
- Olin Francis as Olin Hickory
- Leo Willis as Leo Hickory (also appeared in The White Sheep)
- Constantine Romanoff as Sandoni
- Eddie Boland as "Flash" Farrell
- Frank Lanning as Sam Hooper
- Ralph Yearsley as Hank Hooper (also appeared in Tol'able David)

== Production ==
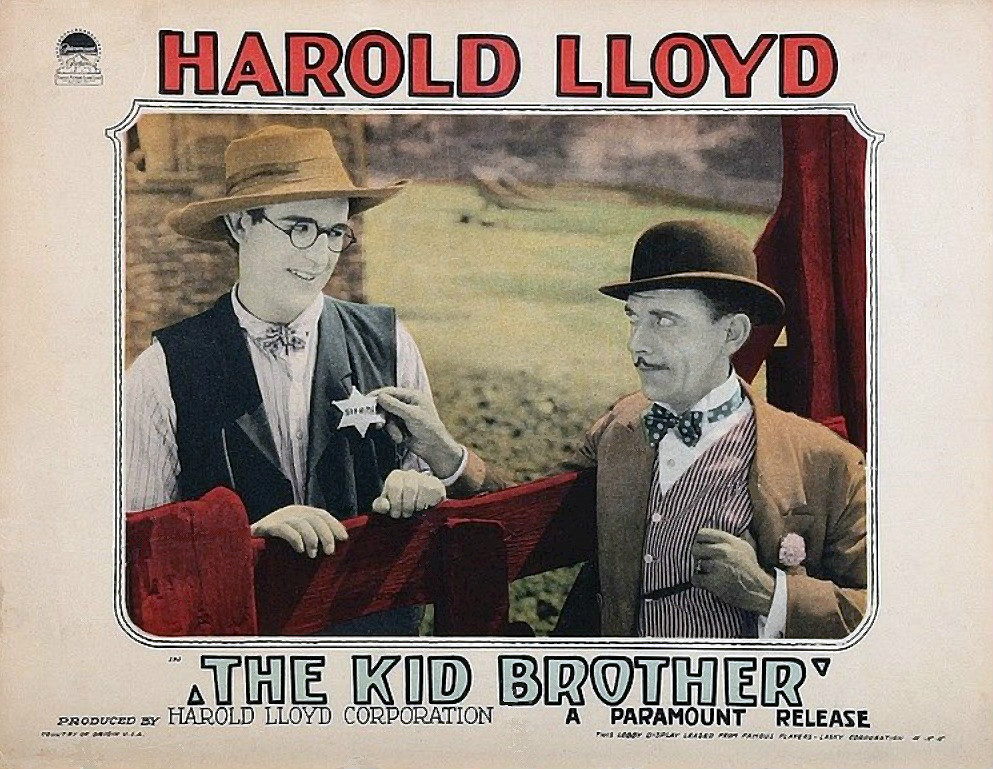
Lobby card

This was the last of Lloyd's features to star Jobyna Ralston, who starred as leading lady in five of his previous films. She would go on to play a supporting part in Wings.

Lloyd wanted the film to have more gags than any of his previous features, so around eight writers and gagmen worked on the script. Many of these bits were cut from the finished film, and some were incorporated into Lloyd's subsequent films. The rural setting was a contrast to most of Lloyd's urban films of the mid to late 1920s. It was filmed in the then-rural California towns of Glendale, Burbank, and Altadena (near current-day Pasadena), and the derelict ship scenes were filmed at Catalina Island. The ship was the Palmyra, its keel laid in 1870 in Bath, Maine. As reported in the San Pedro Daily pilot, "The Harold Lloyd Motion Picture Corporation has purchased the old ship to take part In some comedy."

Due to contract problems with another studio, director Lewis Milestone left the production after having helmed a majority of the film in an uncredited capacity. (Note: Milestone, however, does appear to have reaped at least one important benefit from his efforts, on which basis, it was reported, he subsequently landed the job directing Howard Hughes World War I comedy Two Arabian Knights (1927).)

== Home media ==
A restored version of The Kid Brother with a new score by Carl Davis was prepared by Kevin Brownlow and David Gill for Thames Television in the early 1990s. For the 2019 Criterion Collection Blu-ray release, a new 4K transfer was done at the Packard Humanities Institute using a 35mm fine grain which was struck from the original camera negative and preserved by the UCLA Film & Television Archive. The image was then restored by L’Immagine Ritrovata in Bologna, Italy. Like the older Brownlow & Gill restoration, this new restoration for Criterion also uses the Carl Davis score, and also includes an alternate organ score by Gaylord Carter.

== See also ==
- Harold Lloyd filmography
- List of United States comedy films
- The House That Shadows Built (1931 promotional film by Paramount)
