= Slow as Lightning =

1923 silent film

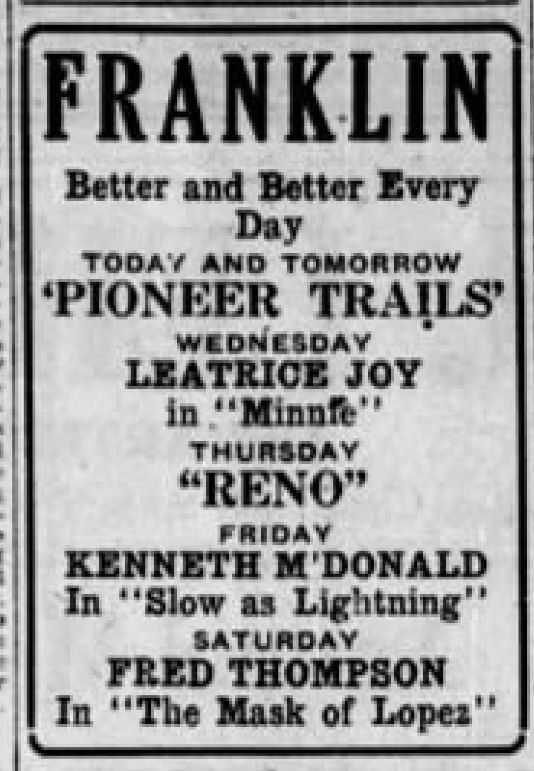
- Advertisement for upcoming films including Slow as Lightning
- Directed by: Grover Jones
- Written by: Suzanne Avery; Bud Barsky
- Produced by: Anthony J. Xydias
- Starring: Kenneth MacDonald; Billy 'Red' Jones; Edna Pennington
- Cinematography: Bert Longenecker
- Production company: Sunset Productions
- Distributed by: Aywon Film Corporation
- Release date: December 19, 1923
- Running time: 57 minutes
- Country: United States
- Language: Silent (English intertitles)

Slow as Lightning is a 1923 American silent action film directed by Grover Jones and starring Kenneth MacDonald, Billy 'Red' Jones, and Edna Pennington.

== Cast ==
- Kenneth MacDonald as Jimmie March
- Billy 'Red' Jones as Jimmie March as a Child
- Edna Pennington as Eleanor Philips
- Gordon Sackville as E.J. Philips
- William Lester as Mortimer Fenton
- William Malan as Pat Mc Guire, the Irishman
- Joe Bonner as Tony Guasti, the Italian
- Max Asher as Isaac Cohen, the Hebrew
- Otto Metzetti as Chief of Crooks

== Bibliography ==
- Munden, Kenneth White. The American Film Institute Catalog of Motion Pictures Produced in the United States, Part 1. University of California Press, 1997.
