= Don't Shove =

1919 film

- Directed by: Alfred J. Goulding
- Written by: H. M. Walker
- Produced by: Hal Roach
- Starring: Harold Lloyd
- Cinematography: Walter Lundin
- Production company: Rolin Films
- Distributed by: Pathé Exchange
- Release date: August 31, 1919
- Running time: 11 minutes
- Country: United States
- Language: Silent (English intertitles)

Don't Shove is a 1919 American short comedy film featuring Harold Lloyd. Prints of the film exist at the Library of Congress, the UCLA Film & Television Archive, the Museum of Modern Art, and the Cinémathèque québécoise.

== Cast ==
- Harold Lloyd as Harold
- Bebe Daniels as Bebe
- Bud Jamison as Harold's rival
- Noah Young as Tough guy
- Eddie Boland
- Sammy Brooks as Party Guest
- Lige Conley (as Lige Cromley)
- Wallace Howe (as W. Howe)
- Dee Lampton as Fat Rival
- Marie Mosquini
- Fred C. Newmeyer (as Fred Newmeyer)
- James Parrott
- Snub Pollard
- Gus Leonard as Old man (uncredited)

== Plot ==
Harold arrives as Bebe's birthday party bearing a large gift. His rival, however, changes the box's contents so that when Bebe opens the box it contains a pipe and a whisky flask. Upset, she orders Harold to leave the party. Upon leaving the premises, Harold gets into a prolonged scuffle with another party guest who wants to make sure Harold does leave. A teenage boy eventually knocks out Harold's pursuer. Harold asks the boy to teach him boxing basics. In doing so, Harold accidentally strikes a policeman. Harold flees from the officer and ends up in a roller rink. By coincidence, the attendees at Bebe's birthday party visit the same roller rink. Harold ends up back in Bebe's good graces after he wins a "hurdle race" on roller skates that features numerous obstacles, jumps and ramps.

== See also ==
- List of American films of 1919
- Harold Lloyd filmography
