= Dynamite Dan (film) =

1924 film

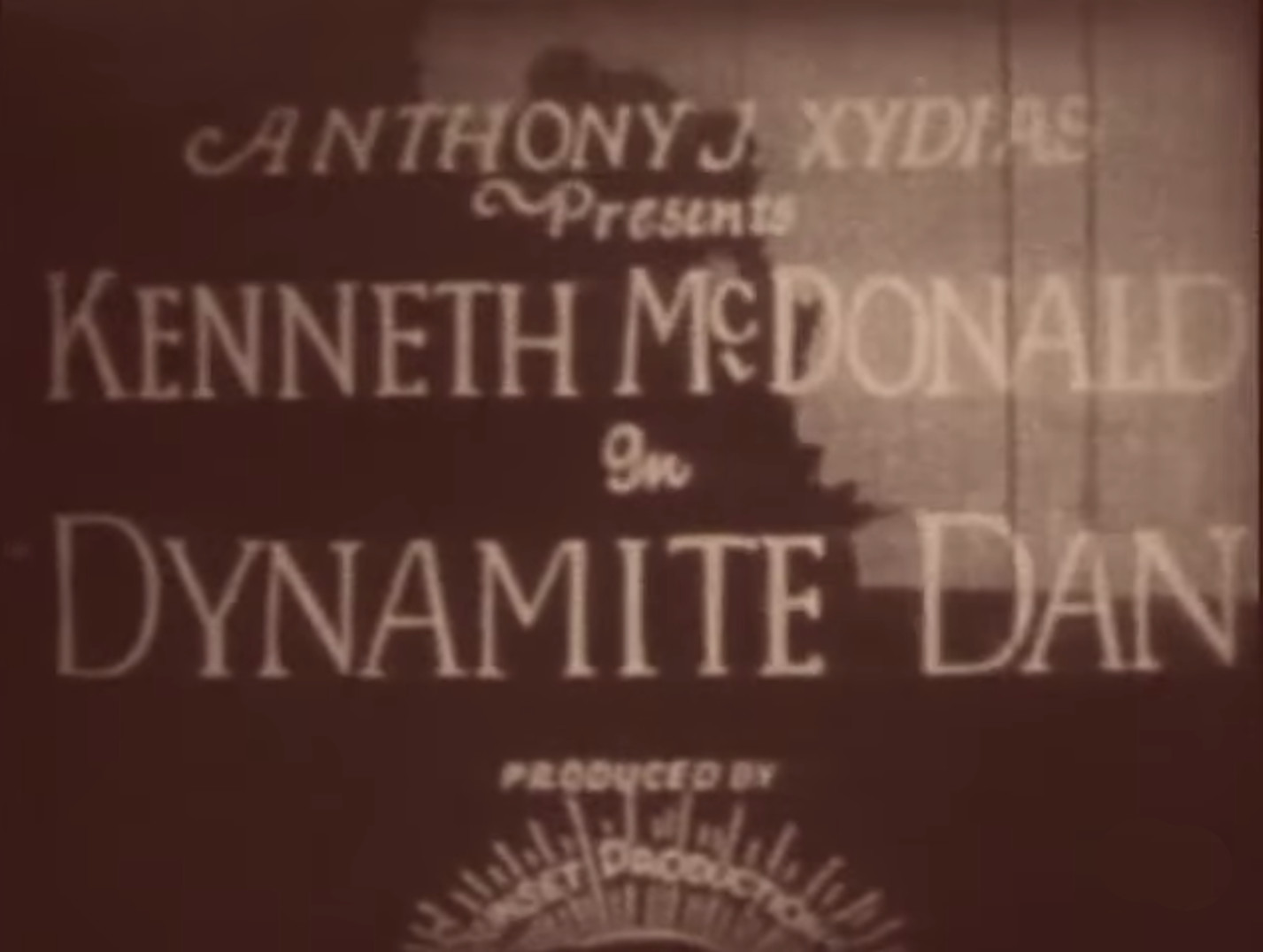
- Film title card
- Directed by: Bruce M. Mitchell
- Written by: Bruce M. Mitchell (screenplay); Enoch Van Pelt (titles)
- Produced by: Anthony J. Xydias
- Starring: Kenneth MacDonald; Frank Rice; Boris Karloff; Eddie Harris; Harry Woods
- Cinematography: Bert Longenecker
- Distributed by: Aywon Film Corporation
- Release date: October 3, 1924
- Running time: 5 reels (66 minutes)
- Country: United States
- Language: Silent with English intertitles

Dynamite Dan is a 1924 American drama film directed by Bruce M. Mitchell and featuring Kenneth MacDonald and Boris Karloff. The film is about a young dockworker who is framed for a robbery he did not commit by his foreman, gangster Tony Garcia. Prints of this film survive and are available on DVD. Boris Karloff, who plays the gangster, only appears in the beginning and end of the film.

== Plot ==
A young dockworker named Dan McLeod is accused of a robbery at his job on the loading dock that was actually committed by his foreman Tony Garcia. Dan escapes from the police and a comical detective named Sherlock Jones sets out to track him down and recapture him. Dan gets a job as a gym teacher at his girlfriend Helen's school, but gets fired soon after. Next he becomes a professional boxer and calls himself Dynamite Dan. Dan asks his girlfriend to spy for him at his old job and learn who it was that framed him for the robbery. In the film's finale, Dan has to box a gangster named Brute Lacy in the ring for the championship as his girlfriend is being menaced by gangster Tony Garcia.

== Cast ==
- Kenneth MacDonald as Dynamite Dan McLeod
- Frank Rice as Boss
- Boris Karloff as Tony Garcia
- Eddie Harris as Sherlock Jones
- Diana Alden as Helen Havens (Dan's girlfriend)
- Harry Woods as Brute Lacy the boxer
- Jack Richardson as Spike Moran
- Emily Gerdes as Toodles
- Jack Waltemeyer as Tim O'Rourke
- Max Asher (credited as Max Aschert)
- Carrie Daumery as The School Principal
- Mrs. Harold Lockwood as School Teacher

== See also ==
- List of American films of 1924
