= Wild to Go =

1926 film

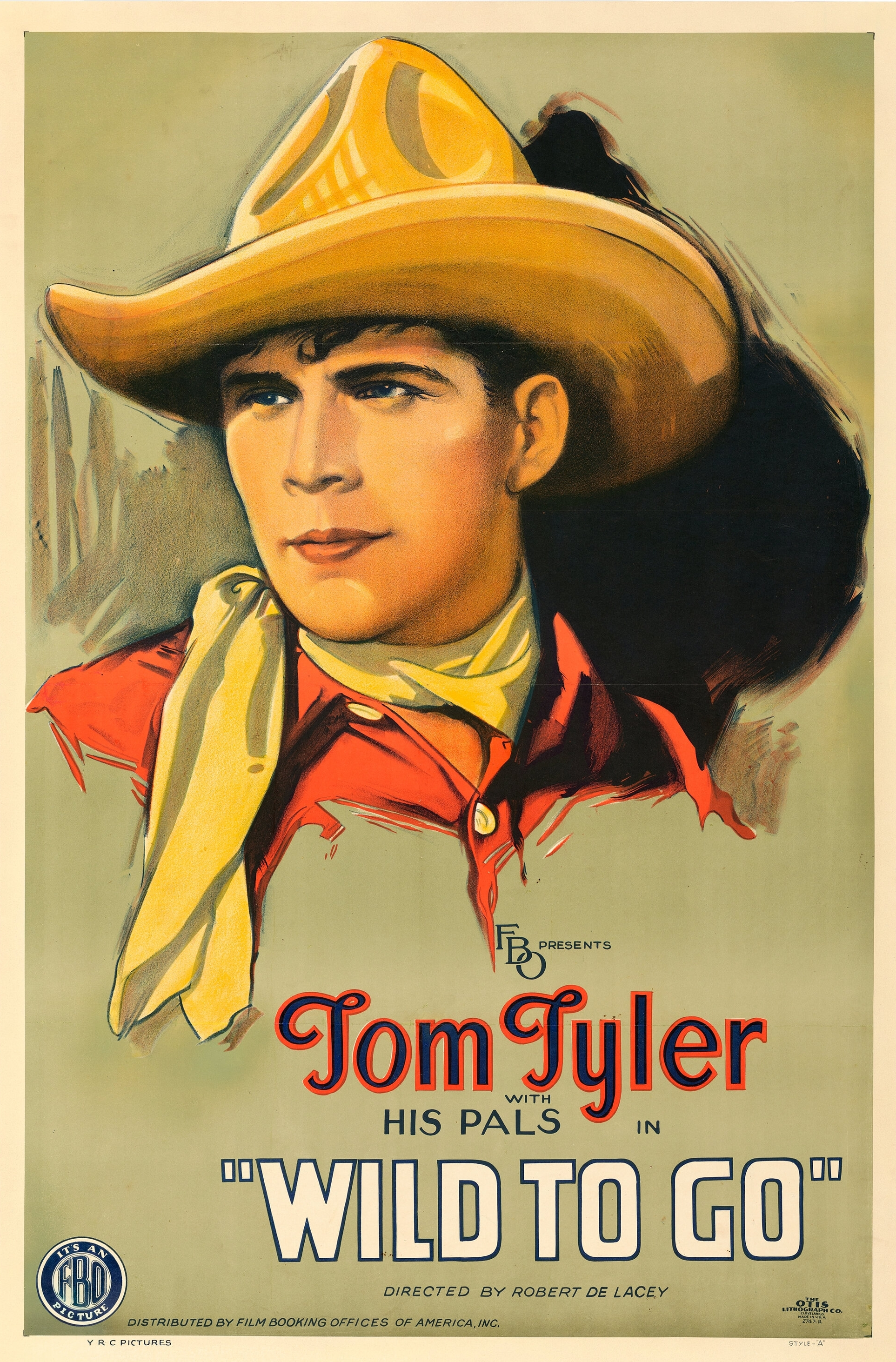
- Film poster
- Directed by: Robert De Lacey
- Written by: F.A.E. Pine
- Starring: Tom Tyler; Frankie Darro; Eugenia Gilbert
- Cinematography: John W. Leezer
- Production company: Robertson-Cole Pictures Corporation
- Distributed by: Film Booking Offices of America
- Release date: April 18, 1926
- Running time: 5 reels
- Country: United States
- Language: Silent (English intertitles)

Wild to Go is a 1926 American silent Western film directed by Robert De Lacey and starring Tom Tyler, Frankie Darro, and Eugenia Gilbert.

== Plot ==
As described in a film magazine, Tom Blake, on his way to get money from the bank to pay off the mortgage on his boss's ranch, is intercepted by Jake Trumbull, the foreman of Simon Purdy, the man who holds the mortgage. Tom is shanghaied, but escapes and swims ashore to a school for young women, where he meets Marjorie Felton, his boss's daughter. Jake then kidnaps Tom and Marjorie and forces Tom to state where he left the check. Frankie, Tom's younger brother, slips off, gets the check, and delivers it to Purdy just in time. Tom frees himself and rescues the young woman.

== Cast ==
- Tom Tyler as Tom Blake
- Frankie Darro as Frankie Blake
- Fred Burns as Simon Purdy
- Ethan Laidlaw as Jake Trumbull
- Earl Haley as Henchman 'Baldy'
- Eugenia Gilbert as Marjorie Felton

== Preservation ==
A print of Wild to Go is held in the collection of CINEMATEK in Brussels.

== Bibliography ==
- Munden, Kenneth White. The American Film Institute Catalog of Motion Pictures Produced in the United States, Part 1. University of California Press, 1997.
