= Ford West =

American actor and vaudeville performer

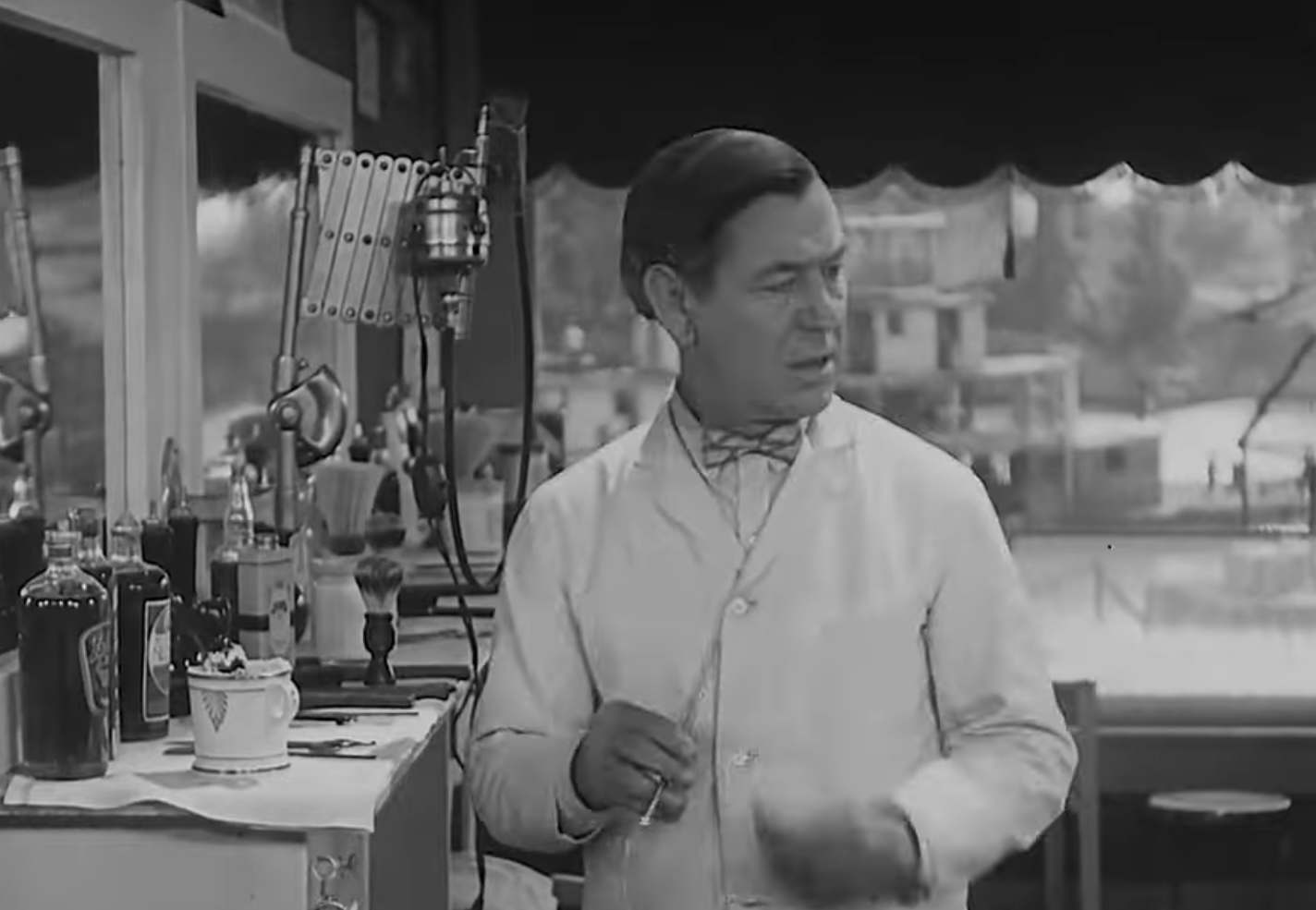
- West in Steamboat Bill, Jr., 1928
- Born: Crawford Jennings West; March 27, 1873; Texas, U.S.
- Died: January 3, 1936 (aged 62); California, U.S.
- Occupations: Actor, vaudeville performer
- Years active: 1896–1935
- Spouse: May Milloy (m. 1915–1936, his death)

Ford West (born Crawford Jennings West; March 27, 1873 – January 3, 1936) was an American actor and vaudeville performer. He appeared in numerous silent and early sound films, including Sherlock Jr. (1924), Steamboat Bill, Jr (1928). Before transitioning to film, he was a well-known vaudeville performer, often partnering with comedian Foster Ball.

== Vaudeville career ==
Ford West began his career in vaudeville in the late 19th century, his first steps in vaudeville can be traced back to 1896.

He specialized in comedy duos, often playing the straight man.

His first duo was "Dot and Ford West" in 1898. He would remain steadily present in the vaudeville circuit in the following years, but he would have to wait until 1911 to find success in a successful comedic duo with veteran comic actor Foster Ball.

Their act, Since the Days of '61, was a character comedy based on Civil War veterans. They performed extensively on the Orpheum Circuit and gained a reputation for their patriotic humor and sharp character work. The duo was widely praised by critics and audiences, with reviews stating that they "registered the hit of the show" at venues like the Majestic Theatre in Chicago.

In 1915, Ball and West officially dissolved their partnership, even though they continued to occasionally perform their successful play in the following years, West went on to perform independently with various stage partners, including his wife May Milloy, Fred Taylor, and Bud Hale, but he never achieved the same level of success.

== Film career ==
In 1920, Ford West transitioned from vaudeville to film, joining Fox Studios. Unsurprisingly, he mostly performed in comedies, taking on supporting roles alongside comic actors such as Slim Summerville (Ten Night Without a Barroom), Al St. John (All Wet), Ben Turpin (The Mariage Circus), Buster Keaton (Sherlock Jr and Steamboat Bill, Jr), The Three Stooges (Uncivil Warrios)

== Personal life ==
Ford West married actress May Milloy on November 22, 1915, in St. Paul, Minnesota. They remained married until his death in 1936.

== Filmography ==
- 1920: Ten Nights Without a Barroom
- 1921: Fighting Fate as Lew Muggins
- 1921: Grief
- 1921: The Playhouse
- 1922: All Wet
- 1923: Post No Bills
- 1924: Sherlock Jr. as Theater Manager / Gillette
- 1925: The Marriage Circus as Wedding Guest
- 1925: Duped as Marshal
- 1926: The Broadway Gallant as Hiram Weatherby
- 1927: Kid Tricks
- 1928: Steamboat Bill, Jr. as Barber
- 1929: Half-Way to Heaven as Stationmaster
- 1931: Cimarron
- 1931: Three Hollywood Girls
- 1931: Everything’s Rosie as Judge Wall
- 1933: King of the Wild Horses as Dr. Anderson
- 1935: The Little Colonel as Village hanger-on
- 1935: Uncivil Warriors as Lieutenant Colonel

== Sources ==
- AFI Catalog – Ford West
- Variety – Ball and West Performance Reviews
- Variety – Ball and West Partnership Dissolution
- Review of Ford West's Comedy Act (1920)
