= The Coast Patrol =

1925 American silent film

- The film
- Directed by: Bud Barsky
- Written by: William E. Wing
- Produced by: Bud Barsky
- Starring: Kenneth MacDonald; Fay Wray
- Cinematography: Ernest Miller
- Edited by: Grace Harrison
- Distributed by: Bud Barsky (State's Rights)
- Release date: March 20, 1925
- Running time: 63 minutes; 6 reels
- Country: United States
- Language: Silent (English intertitles)

The Coast Patrol is a 1925 American silent action drama film directed by Bud Barsky and starring Kenneth MacDonald with an early appearance by Fay Wray. This film is an independent programmer picture.

Prints are held at Cineteca Del Friuli, Germona, UCLA Film & Television Archive, and the Library of Congress.

== Cast ==
- Kenneth MacDonald as Dale Ripley
- Claire de Lorez as Valerie Toske
- Fay Wray as Beth Slocum
- Spottiswoode Aitken as Captain Slocum
- Gino Corrado as Eric Marmont
