= Battling Mason =

1924 film

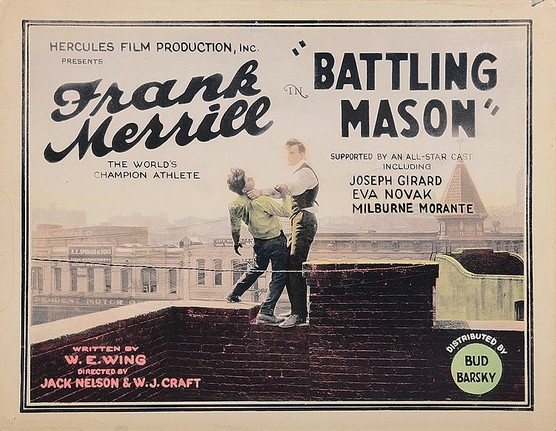
- Directed by: William James Craft; Jack Nelson
- Written by: William E. Wing
- Starring: Frank Merrill; Eva Novak; Joseph W. Girard
- Production company: Hercules Film Productions
- Distributed by: Bud Barsky Corporation
- Release date: December 24, 1924
- Running time: 50 minutes
- Country: United States
- Languages: Silent; English intertitles

Battling Mason is a 1924 American silent comedy drama film directed by William James Craft and Jack Nelson and starring Frank Merrill, Eva Novak and Joseph W. Girard.

== Synopsis ==
Mason a young New Yorker, who loves a fight, runs for public office. As part of his election campaign he agrees not to get involved in any fights and refuses to respond with violence to even the most heavy provocation. All this disappoints his wealthy uncle who mistakenly believes that it is due to cowardice.

== Cast ==
- Frank Merrill as Mason
- Eva Novak
- Joseph W. Girard
- Milburn Morante
- William Elmer
- Dick Sutherland

== Preservation ==
With no holdings located in archives, Battling Mason is considered a lost film.

== Bibliography ==
- Connelly, Robert B. The Silents: Silent Feature Films, 1910-36, Volume 40, Issue 2. December Press, 1998.
- Munden, Kenneth White. The American Film Institute Catalog of Motion Pictures Produced in the United States, Part 1. University of California Press, 1997.
