= William E. Wing =

American screenwriter

- Born: July 4, 1869; Maine, USA
- Died: March 10, 1947 (aged 77); Los Angeles, California, USA
- Occupation: Screenwriter
- Years active: 1912–1927

William Everett Wing (born William Ernett Wing; July 4, 1869 – March 10, 1947) was an American screenwriter of the silent era. He wrote "scenarios" for at more than 90 films between 1912 and 1927. Born in Gardiner, Maine, he died in Los Angeles, California.

== Selected filmography ==
- Olaf—An Atom (1913)
- Red Hicks Defies the World (1913)
- Death's Marathon (1913)
- A Woman in the Ultimate (1913)
- Casey at the Bat (1916)
- Sold for Marriage (1916)
- The Brazen Beauty (1918)
- Lure of the Circus (1918)
- The Iron Man (1924)
- The Riddle Rider (1924)
- Reckless Speed (1924)
- The Breathless Moment (1924)
- Battling Mason (1924)
- Speed Madness (1925)
- The Coast Patrol (1925)
- Makers of Men (1925)
- Savages of the Sea (1925)
- Vic Dyson Pays (1925)
- Glenister of the Mounted (1926)
- Born to Battle (1926)
- The Two-Gun Man (1926)
- The Masquerade Bandit (1926)
- Hands Across the Border (1926)
- Tarzan and the Golden Lion (1927)
