= Tarzan the Mighty =

1928 film

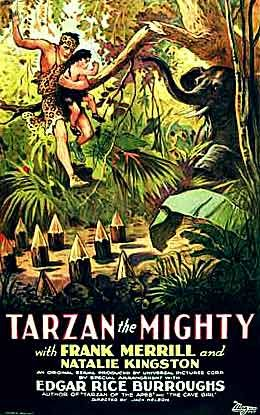
- Theatrical poster to Tarzan the Mighty (1928)
- Directed by: Jack Nelson; Ray Taylor
- Written by: Ian McClosky Heath; Jack Nelson
- Based on: Jungle Tales of Tarzan by Edgar Rice Burroughs
- Starring: Frank Merrill; Al Ferguson; Natalie Kingston; Bobby Nelson
- Distributed by: Universal Pictures
- Release date: October 29, 1928
- Running time: 15 episodes
- Country: United States
- Language: Silent (English intertitles)

Tarzan the Mighty is a 1928 American silent action film serial directed by Jack Nelson and Ray Taylor. It was nominally based on the collection Jungle Tales of Tarzan by Edgar Rice Burroughs. The film is now considered to be lost.

== Cast ==
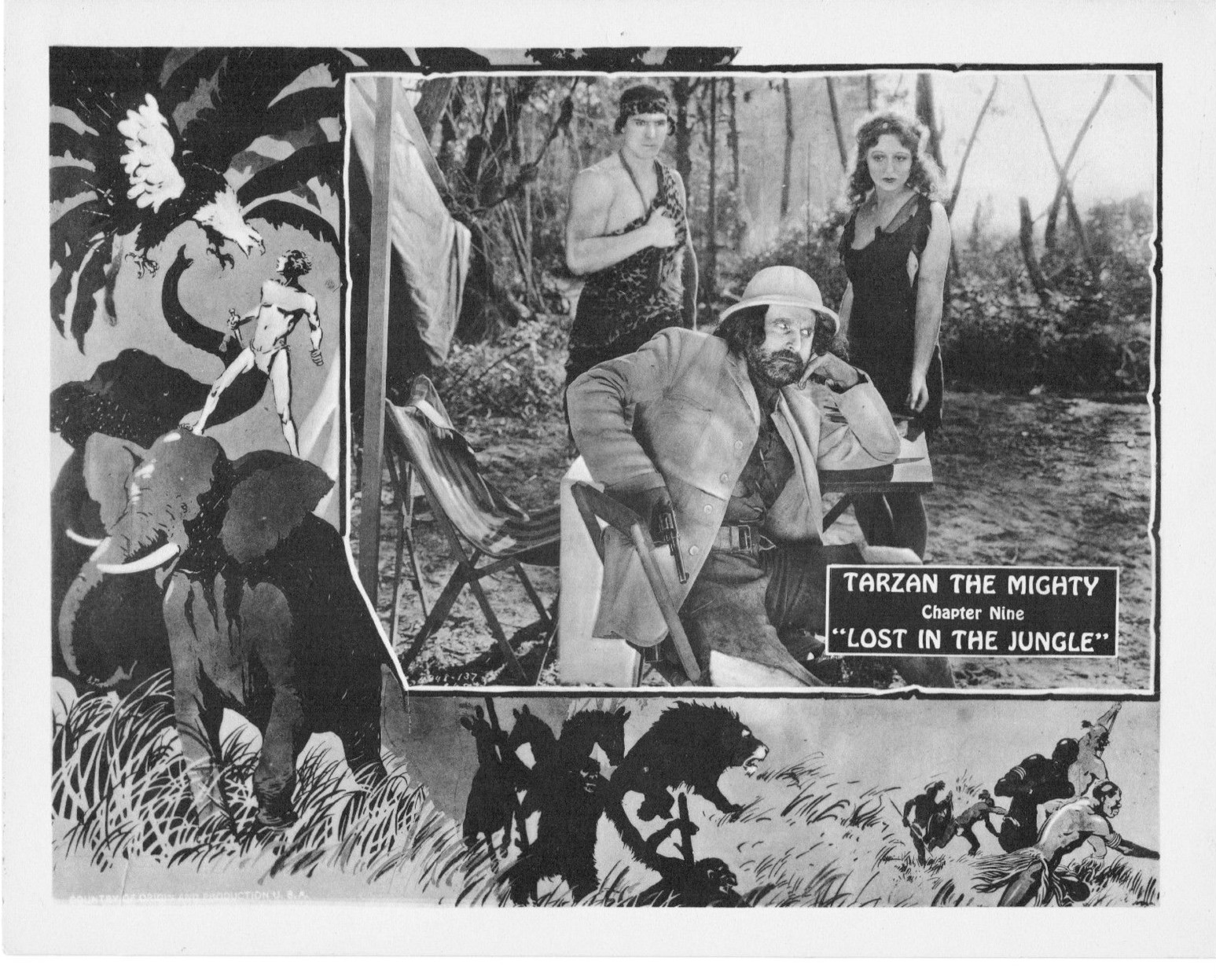
Lobby card for Chapter Nine

- Frank Merrill as Tarzan. Joe Bonomo was cast as Tarzan but, while filming Perils of the Wild, fractured his left leg and severely injured his sacroiliac joint while performing a stunt. Director Jack Nelson remembered Frank Merill from working with him on an earlier production, either Perils of the Jungle (1927) or The Adventures of Tarzan (1921). Whichever production it was, he felt that Merrill was a natural replacement and the new lead actor started filming the next morning.
- Al Ferguson as Black John, village ruler of Pirates' descendants
- Natalie Kingston as Mary Trevor. There was no Jane in this production. Kingston was cast as the castaway and love interest Mary Trevor.
- Bobby Nelson as Bobby Trevor, Mary's younger brother
- Lorimer Johnston as Lord Greystoke, Tarzan's uncle

== Production ==
After the failure of Tarzan and the Golden Lion, starring "Big Jim" Pierce, FBO did not make a sequel. Universal Pictures paid Burroughs an undisclosed sum to make a new Tarzan serial based on Jungle Tales of Tarzan. This serial was later re-titled Tarzan the Mighty.

Merrill, who was the National Gymnastics champion from 1916 to 1918, came up with the vine-swinging technique. Merrill actually swung on a "vine" (a rope) with Kingston in one arm. The footage was later studied by MGM for Tarzan the Ape Man (1932) and the subsequent series of Tarzan films with Johnny Weissmuller.

Production began on April 12 and finished on October 28, 1928. The serial was originally intended to be 12 chapters long but it was so successful that it was extended to 15 chapters in length. Tarzan the Mighty was successful enough for a sequel, Tarzan the Tiger (1929), to be put into production with many of the cast returning (in slightly different roles in some cases).

== Chapter titles ==
1. The Terror of Tarzan
2. The Love Cry
3. The Call of the Jungle
4. The Lion's Leap
5. Flames of Hate
6. The Fiery Pit
7. The Leopard's Lair
8. The Jungle Traitor
9. Lost in the Jungle
10. Jaws of Death
11. A Thief in the Night
12. The Enemy of Tarzan
13. Perilous Paths
14. Facing Death
15. The Reckoning

== Novel ==
Tarzan the Mighty
- Series: Tarzan (book series)
- Publisher: Arthur B. Reeve
- Publication date: 2005
- Pages: 130
- ISBN: 978-1-4357-4971-9
- Preceded by: The Dark Heart of Time (1999)
- Followed by: The Adventures of Tarzan (2006)

Originally written as a 15-part serial for newspapers in 1926, it was collected and published as a trade-paperback (ISBN 978-1-4357-4971-9) by ERBville Press in 2005. The book became available as a hardcover via Lulu.com in 2008.

=== Chapters ===
1. Jungle King
2. Queen of His Kind
3. Black John Plots
4. A Pawn of Passion
5. Tantor Trumpets
6. Giant Emotions
7. Flaming Hate
8. Mock Marriage
9. Black John's Revenge
10. The Imposter
11. The Stolen Heritage
12. Treachery Higher Up
13. A Thief in the Night
14. Momentary Triumph
15. The Day of Reckoning

== See also ==
- List of film serials
- List of film serials by studio
- Tarzan in film and other non-print media
- List of lost films
