= The Broadway Gallant =

1926 film

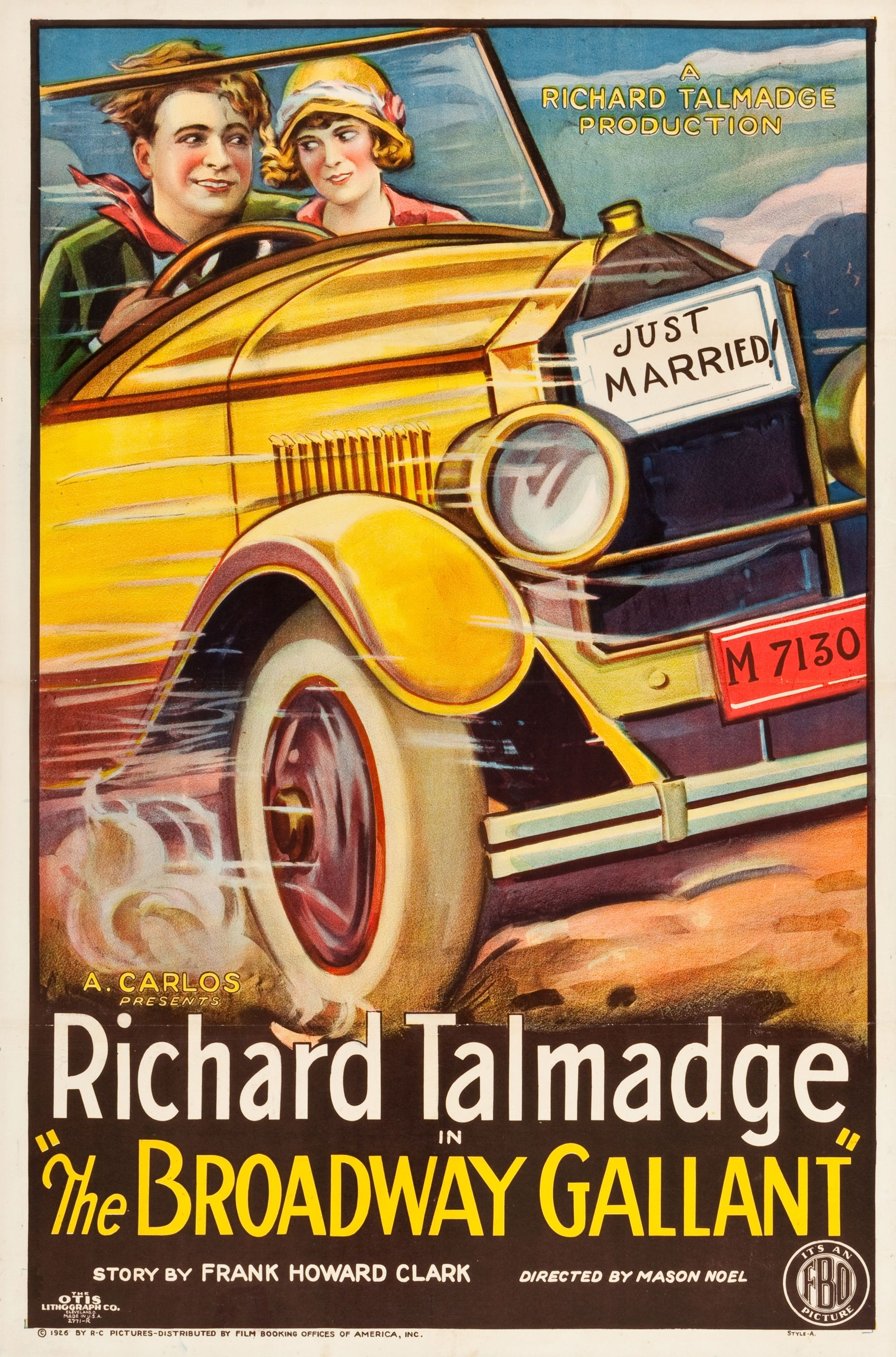
- Theatrical release poster
- Directed by: Noel M. Smith
- Screenplay by: Frank Howard Clark
- Produced by: Richard Talmadge
- Starring: Richard Talmadge; Clara Horton; Joseph Harrington; Jack Richardson; Cecile Cameron; Ford West
- Cinematography: Jack Stevens
- Edited by: Doane Harrison
- Production companies: Richard Talmadge Productions; Carlos Productions
- Distributed by: Film Booking Offices of America
- Release date: April 25, 1926
- Running time: 60 minutes
- Country: United States
- Language: English

The Broadway Gallant is a 1926 American action film directed by Noel M. Smith and written by Frank Howard Clark. The film stars Richard Talmadge, Clara Horton, Joseph Harrington Jack Richardson, Cecile Cameron and Ford West. The film was released on April 25, 1926, by Film Booking Offices of America.

== Plot ==
Heiress Helen Stuart and restless young man Monty Barnes are engaged to be married. Since Helen is not yet 21 years old, her guardian and uncle, Jack Peasley, controls her estate. Jack is not above using Helen's money for his own purposes, such as buying a block of worthless railroad stock. Red Sweeney, who sold him the stock, assures him that should Helen marry before turning 21, she'll never discover the missing money because the estate will revert to her guardian. They force her to marry Monty, who is none the wiser.

== Cast ==
- Richard Talmadge as Monty Barnes
- Clara Horton as Helen Stuart
- Joseph Harrington as Jake Peasley
- Jack Richardson as Red Sweeney
- Cecile Cameron as Rita Delroy
- Ford West as Hiram Weatherby
