= Emily Gerdes =

American actress

- Born: December 29, 1890; Montgomery County, Kansas, U.S.
- Died: September 17, 1974 (aged 83); Los Angeles, California, U.S.
- Occupation: Actress
- Years active: 1917–1940

Emily Gerdes (sometimes credited as Emma Gerdes) was an American character actress active primarily during Hollywood's silent era.

== Biography ==
Gerdes was born near Independence, Kansas, to Herman Eden Gerdes (a veterinarian) and Mary Ellen Glaze. The family soon moved to Missouri and then Arizona before later settling in Glendale, California. Her parents later divorced. In Los Angeles, Gerdes began appearing in films; her first known credit was in 1917's Rebecca of Sunnybrook Farm.

== Selected filmography ==
- Rebecca of Sunnybrook Farm (1917)
- A Lady's Name (1918)
- How Could You, Jean? (1918)
- Puppy Love (1919)
- Once to Every Woman (1920)
- Bell Boy 13 (1923)
- Dynamite Dan (1924)
- Behind Two Guns (1924)
- Heir-Loons (1925)
- Ella Cinders (1926)
- Unknown Dangers (1926)
- Daniel Boone Thru the Wilderness (1926)
- Heroes of the Wild (1927)
- Never the Twins Shall Meet (1932)
- Banjo on My Knee (1936)
- The Grapes of Wrath (1940)
