= While London Sleeps =

1926 film by Howard Bretherton

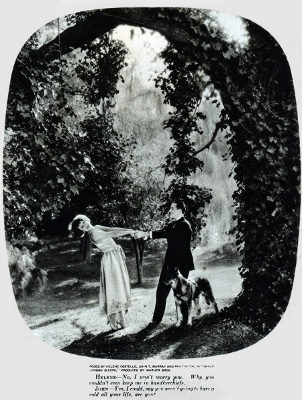
- Still from the film
- Directed by: Howard Bretherton
- Written by: Walter Morosco
- Starring: Rin Tin Tin; Helene Costello; Walter Merrill
- Cinematography: Frank Kesson
- Production company: Warner Bros. Pictures
- Distributed by: Warner Bros. Pictures
- Release date: November 27, 1926
- Running time: 66 minutes 52 minutes (edited British print)
- Country: United States
- Language: Silent (English Intertitles)
- Budget: $119,000
- Box office: $332,000

While London Sleeps is a silent 1926 Warner Bros. film about a police-dog, Rinty, who helps Scotland Yard defeat a dangerous criminal organisation known as the Mediterranean Brotherhood that operates out of the Limehouse district of London. Walter Morosco wrote the screenplay. It was the first of many films directed by Howard Bretherton, and one of several created for Rin Tin Tin, a German Shepherd dog used in films during the 1920s and 1930s. The film appears to be lost. The British release prints censored the more horrific aspects of the film.

George Kotsonaros only appeared in two horror films, this one and The Wizard (1927), and he played a beast-man in both movies. He died in a car accident in Alabama in 1933.

== Plot ==
Inspector Burke of Scotland Yard concentrates all his forces on the capture of London Letter, a notorious criminal leader in the Limehouse district who possesses both Rinty, a splendid dog, and a man-beast monster called The Monk who ravages and kills at his master's command. Burke almost apprehends the gang in the midst of an attempted theft, but Rinty's uncanny perceptions foil Burke's coup, and Foster is killed for betraying the gang. When Rinty loses in a fight against another dog, Burke's daughter, Dale, rescues Rinty from London Letter's abuse, and he becomes devoted to his new mistress. At the criminal's order, the monster kidnaps Dale and imprisons her. Burke and his men wound London Letter while on his trail, and Rinty finds him dying. In a ferocious battle, Rinty kills the monster by tearing out his throat.

== Cast ==
- Rin Tin Tin as Rinty
- Helene Costello as Dale Burke
- Walter Merrill as Thomas Hallard
- John Patrick as Foster
- Otto Matieson as London Letter
- George Kotsonaros as The Monk
- De Witt Jennings as Inspector Burke
- Carl Stockdale as Stokes
- Les Bates as Long Tom

== Box office ==
According to Warner Bros records the film earned $235,000 domestically and $97,000 foreign.

== Preservation status ==
No prints of this film are known to survive suggesting it is lost. It is on the Lost Film Files list for missing Warner Bros.

== See also ==
- List of early Warner Bros. sound and talking features
