= Makers of Men =

1925 film directed by Forrest Sheldon

- Directed by: Forrest Sheldon
- Written by: William E. Wing
- Produced by: Bud Barsky
- Starring: Kenneth MacDonald; Clara Horton; J.P. McGowan
- Cinematography: E.M. MacManigal
- Edited by: Grace Harrison
- Production company: Bud Barsky Corporation
- Distributed by: Bud Barsky Corporation; Woolf and Freedman (UK)
- Release date: May 8, 1925
- Running time: 60 minutes
- Country: United States
- Languages: Silent; English intertitles

Makers of Men is a 1925 American silent war drama film directed by Forrest Sheldon and starring Kenneth MacDonald, Clara Horton and J.P. McGowan.

== Synopsis ==
The easily disturbed Jimmy Jones suffers from a nervous disorder that provokes mockery about his cowardice from the fellow inhabitants of his small town even Lillian the woman he is in love with. When the First World War breaks out he volunteers for the Army. After serving in France along with an utterly fearless Sergeant, he returns home completely cured.

== Cast ==
- Kenneth MacDonald as Jimmy Jones
- Clara Horton as Lillian Gilman
- J.P. McGowan as Sgt. Banks
- W.H. Burton as Hiram Renfrew
- William Lowery as Steppling
- Ethan Laidlaw as Shiftless Poole

== Bibliography ==
- Connelly, Robert B. The Silents: Silent Feature Films, 1910-36, Volume 40, Issue 2. December Press, 1998.
- Munden, Kenneth White. The American Film Institute Catalog of Motion Pictures Produced in the United States, Part 1. University of California Press, 1997.
