= Jack Nelson (actor) =

American actor

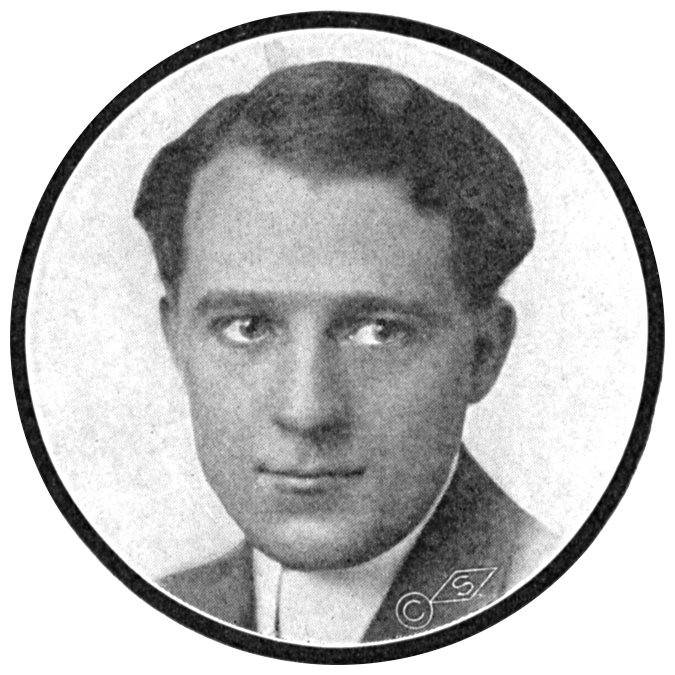
- Born: Jack Claude Nelson; October 15, 1888; Memphis, Tennessee, U.S.
- Died: March 18, 1969 (aged 80); Los Angeles, California, U.S.
- Occupations: Actor, film director
- Years active: 1910-1935
- Children: Bobby

Jack Claude Nelson (October 15, 1888 – March 18, 1969) was an American actor and film director of the silent era. He appeared in more than 80 films between 1910 and 1935. He also directed 58 films between 1920 and 1935.

== Selected filmography ==
- If My Country Should Call (1916)
- Undine (1916)
- Pasquale (1916)
- A Jewel in Pawn (1917)
- The Spotted Lily (1917)
- The Lash of Power (1917)
- The Flash of Fate (1918)
- Winner Takes All (1918)
- When Do We Eat? (1918)
- The Haunted Bedroom (1919)
- Rose of the West (1919)
- Love Madness (1920)
- I Am Guilty (1921)
- Rough Riding Romance (1924)
- The Covered Trail (1924)
- Battling Mason (1924)
- Midnight Secrets (1924)
- A Fighting Heart (1924)
- After a Million (1924)
- The Wall Street Whiz (1925)
- He Who Laughs Last (1925)
- The Mysterious Stranger (1925)
- Sunshine of Paradise Alley (1926)
- Hair-Trigger Baxter (1926)
- The Valley of Bravery (1926)
- The Mile-a-Minute Man (1926)
- The Devil's Gulch (1926)
- The Dead Line (1926)
- The Call of the Wilderness (1926)
- Beyond the Rockies (1926)
- Say It with Diamonds (1927)
- Life of an Actress (1927)
- The Fighting Hombre (1927)
- Bulldog Pluck (1927)
- The Shamrock and the Rose (1927)
- Tarzan the Mighty (1928)
- The Diamond Master (1929)
- Two-Gun Caballero (1931)
