= Cupid's Knockout =

1926 film

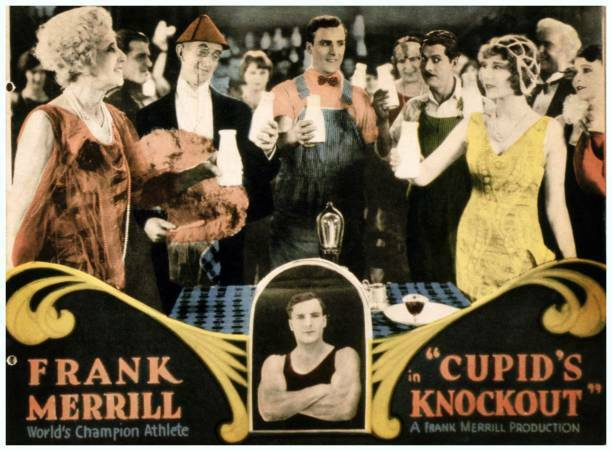
- Directed by: Bruce Mitchell
- Written by: Grover Jones
- Produced by: Peter Kanellos
- Starring: Frank Merrill; Andrée Tourneur; George B. French
- Production company: Hercules Film Productions
- Distributed by: Independent Film Corporation
- Release date: August 1, 1926
- Running time: 50 minutes
- Country: United States
- Languages: Silent; English intertitles

Cupid's Knockout is a 1926 American silent comedy action film directed by Bruce Mitchell and starring Frank Merrill, Andrée Tourneur and George B. French.

== Synopsis ==
Milkman Frank Gibson rescues Sally Hibbard who is under pressure from a corrupt city boss to marry her.

== Cast ==
- Frank Merrill as Frank Gibson
- Andrée Tourneur as Sally Hibbard
- Don Fuller as David Manning
- Marco Charles as 'Measles' Martin
- George B. French as George Hibbard
- Mathilde Brundage as Mrs. Hibbard
- William T. Hayes as 'Rubber Chin' Smith

== Bibliography ==
- Connelly, Robert B. (1998). The Silents: Silent Feature Films, 1910-36. Vol. 40. December Press. ISBN 978-0-913204-36-8.
- Munden, Kenneth White (1997). The American Film Institute Catalog of Motion Pictures Produced in the United States, Part 1. University of California Press. ISBN 978-0-520-20969-5.
