= Speed Madness (1925 film) =

1925 film

- Directed by: Bruce Mitchell
- Written by: William E. Wing
- Produced by: Peter Kanellos
- Starring: Frank Merrill; Clara Horton; Joseph W. Girard
- Production company: Hercules Film Productions
- Distributed by: Hercules Film Productions
- Release date: October 3, 1925
- Running time: 57 minutes
- Country: United States
- Languages: Silent; English intertitles

Speed Madness is a 1925 American silent action film directed by Bruce Mitchell and starring Frank Merrill, Clara Horton and Joseph W. Girard.

== Plot ==
Ted Bromley an automobile enthusiast and inventor, develops a revolutionary new engine valve design. He falls in love with Alice Carey and prevents her being swindled by another potential suitor. Ted eventually earns dividens from his invention, using it to support Alice's family, and thereby earn her admiration in the process.

== Cast ==
- Frank Merrill as Ted Bromley
- Clara Horton as Alice Carey
- Evelyn Sherman
- Garry O'Dell
- Joseph W. Girard
- James Quinn
- Gino Corrado

== Bibliography ==
- Connelly, Robert B. (1998). The Silents: Silent Feature Films, 1910-36. Vol. 40. December Press. ISBN 978-0-913204-36-8.
- Munden, Kenneth White (1997). The American Film Institute Catalog of Motion Pictures Produced in the United States, Part 1. University of California Press. ISBN 978-0-520-20969-5.
