= Frank Merrill (actor) =

American title-winning gymnast, police officer, stuntman, and actor (1893–1966)

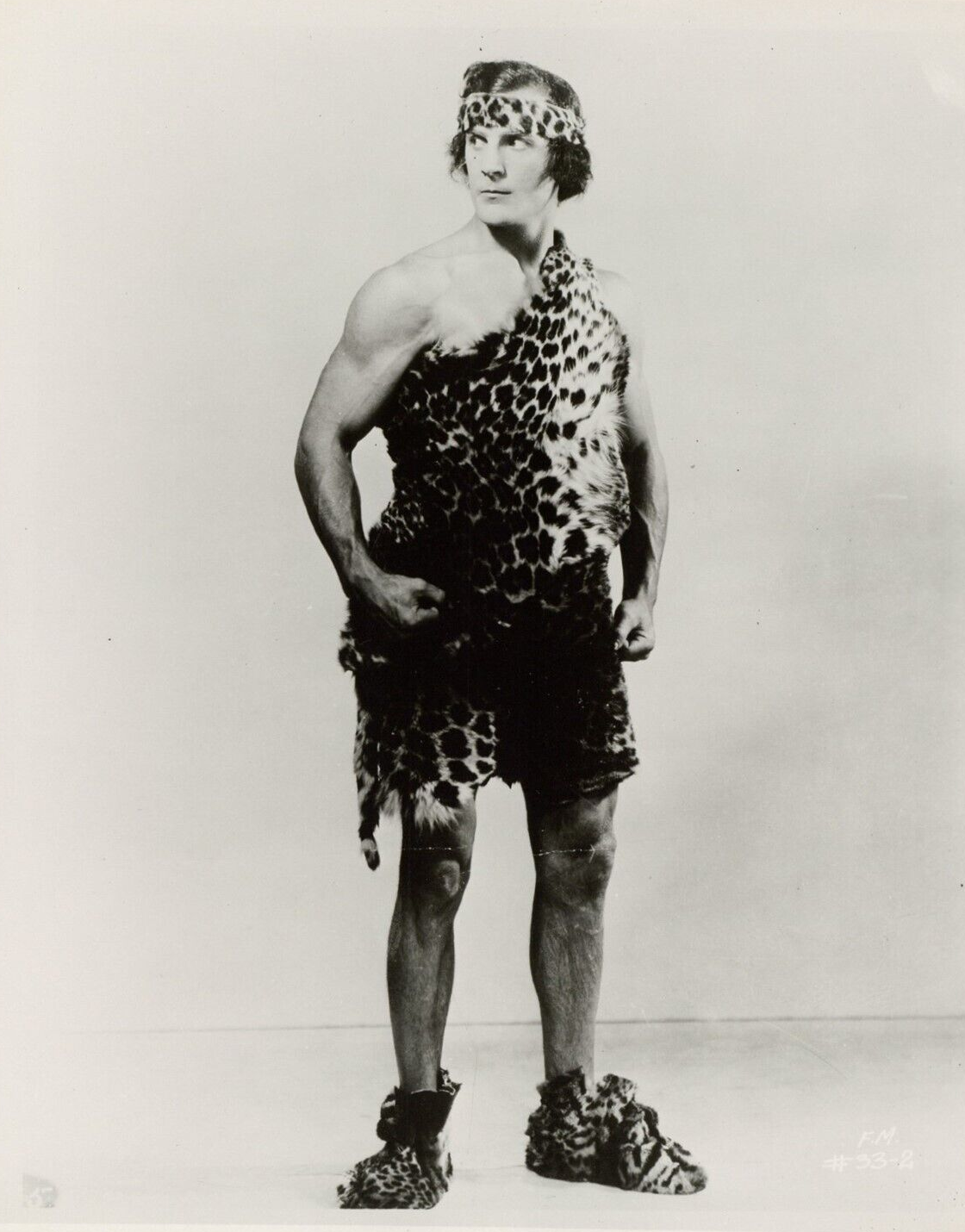
- Merrill as Tarzan circa 1930
- Born: Otto Adolph Stephan Poll; March 21, 1893; Newark, New Jersey, U.S.
- Died: February 12, 1966 (aged 72); Los Angeles, California, U.S.
- Resting place: Hollywood Forever Cemetery
- Occupations: Gymnast; police officer; stuntman; actor
- Years active: 1921–1929

Frank Merrill (born Otto Adolph Stephan Poll; March 21, 1893 – February 12, 1966) was an American national title-winning gymnast (with over 58 titles to his credit), police officer, stuntman, and actor, most famous for being the fifth actor to portray Tarzan on film.

== Tarzan Films ==
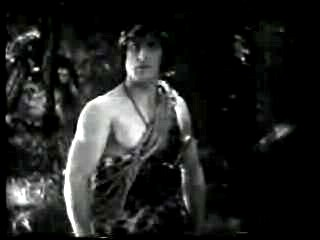
Frank Merrill as Tarzan in Tarzan the Tiger (1929)

Merrill had doubled for the screen's first Tarzan, Elmo Lincoln, in the 1921 movie serial The Adventures of Tarzan, and was cast in the role himself in the 1928 movie serial Tarzan the Mighty. A year later, he starred in the movie serial Tarzan the Tiger, which, though shot as a silent feature, was partially dubbed into sound. Merrill was thus the first actor to voice Tarzan's "victory cry" on film.

== Later life ==
With the coming of sound films, it was decided that Merrill's voice was unsuitable for the "talkies," and he was not asked back in the role. This suited Merrill fine, as he had so enjoyed meeting youngsters via his tenure as Tarzan that he devoted the rest of his life to working with children in the Los Angeles city administration, the Los Angeles Parks Commission, as a recreation director and as a volunteer gymnastics instructor with the YMCA.

== Death ==
Merrill died on February 12, 1966, in Hollywood, California at age 72. His mausoleum is in Hollywood Forever Cemetery.

== Selected filmography ==
- Battling Mason (1924)
- Reckless Speed (1924)
- A Fighting Heart (1924)
- Savages of the Sea (1925)
- Speed Madness (1925)
- A Gentleman Roughneck (1925)
- Cupid's Knockout (1926)
- The Fighting Doctor (1926)
- Unknown Dangers (1926)
- The Hollywood Reporter (1926)
- The Little Wild Girl (1928)
- Tarzan the Mighty (1928)
- Tarzan the Tiger (1929)
