= May Milloy =

American actress

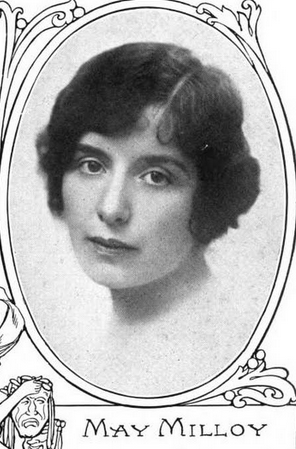
- May Milloy, from a 1914 publication.
- Born: January 25, 1875 either Dublin or Montreal
- Died: November 18, 1967 (aged 92); Santa Barbara, California
- Occupation: actress

May Milloy (January 25, 1875 – November 18, 1967) was an American actress on Broadway, in vaudeville, and in several films.

== Early life ==
May Milloy is usually described as Dublin-born, however some reviews mentioned Montreal as her home. She had acted in Montreal by 1896, before moving to the United States. Her brother Richard Milloy was also an actor and vaudeville performer, and he was also described as being from Montreal.

== Career ==
Milloy was in two Broadway shows in 1912, The Fatted Calf and The Point of View. Other shows she acted in included My Geraldine (1896, in Montreal), Mr. Hopkinson (1909 tour, including Seattle and San Francisco) and More Sinned Against Than Usual (1912–1913), "a high-class travesty sketch". She performed in vaudeville in an all-woman show called Beauty is Only Skin Deep (1914–1915). In 1916, she was still in vaudeville, in an act with her husband, Texas actor Ford West.

Milloy's advice to women, as recorded in a 1914 interview, was this: "Women should read, study, make an effort to have their mental equipment modern and useful. It can only be done by work; but if women worked as hard at their minds as they do at their complexions and their clothes, the world would be a more amusing and satisfactory place in which to live."

Milloy was cast in several films including Souls for Sale (1923), Hurdy Gurdy (1929, with Thelma Todd), Dad's Day (1929), and The Man from Blankley's (1930, starring Loretta Young and John Barrymore).

== Personal life ==
May Milloy married Ford West in 1915, in Minnesota; he died in 1936. She died in Santa Barbara, California, in 1967, aged 92 years.
