= Trail of the Horse Thieves =

1929 film

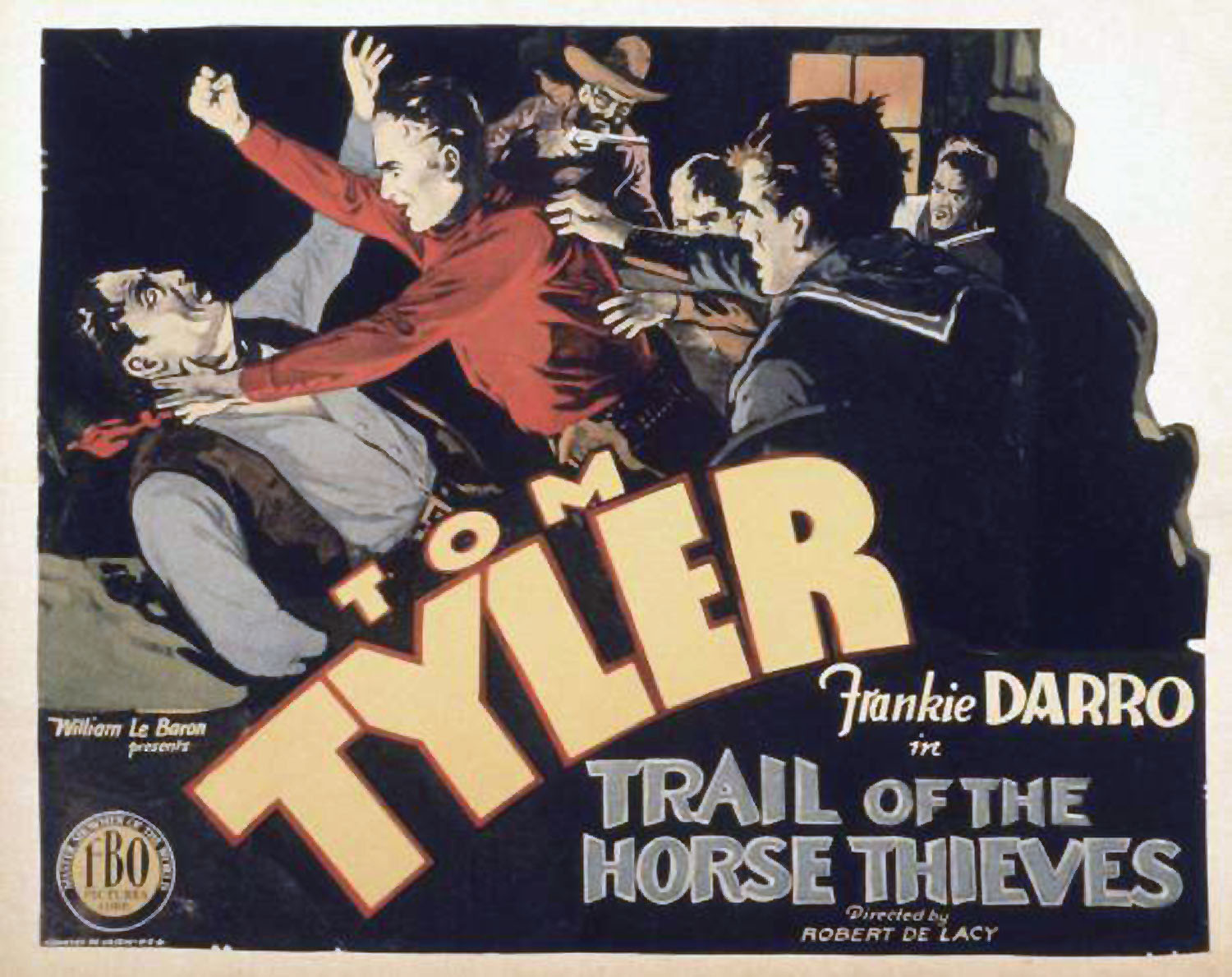
- Theatrical release poster
- Directed by: Robert De Lacey
- Screenplay by: Frank Howard Clark; Helen Gregg
- Starring: Tom Tyler; Betty Amann; Harry O'Connor; Frankie Darro; Barney Furey; Bill Nestell
- Cinematography: Nicholas Musuraca
- Edited by: Jack Kitchin
- Production company: Film Booking Offices of America
- Distributed by: Film Booking Offices of America
- Release date: January 13, 1929
- Running time: 50 minutes
- Country: United States
- Languages: Silent; English intertitles

Trail of the Horse Thieves is a 1929 American silent Western film directed by Robert De Lacey and written by Frank Howard Clark and Helen Gregg. The film stars Tom Tyler, Betty Amann, Harry O'Connor, Frankie Darro, Barney Furey and Bill Nestell. The film was released on January 13, 1929, by Film Booking Offices of America.

== Cast ==
- Tom Tyler as Vic Stanley
- Betty Amann as Amy Taggart
- Harry O'Connor as Clint Taggart
- Frankie Darro as Buddy
- Barney Furey as The Eagle
- Bill Nestell as Babcock
- Victor Allen as Sheriff
- Ray Childs as Rustler
- Leo Willett as Curtis
