= The Amazing Vagabond =

1929 film

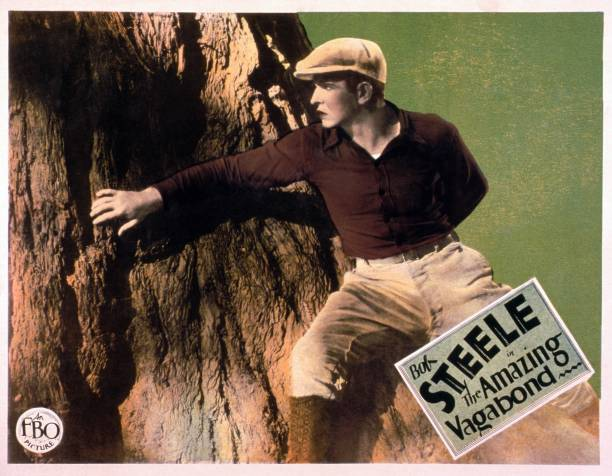
- Theatrical release poster
- Directed by: Wallace Fox
- Screenplay by: Frank Howard Clark; Helen Gregg
- Starring: Bob Steele; Thomas G. Lingham; Jay Morley; Perry Murdock; Lafe McKee; Thelma Daniels
- Cinematography: Virgil Miller
- Edited by: Della M. King
- Production company: Film Booking Offices of America
- Distributed by: Film Booking Offices of America
- Release date: April 7, 1929
- Running time: 50 minutes
- Country: United States
- Languages: Silent; English intertitles

The Amazing Vagabond is a 1929 American silent Western film directed by Wallace Fox and written by Frank Howard Clark and Helen Gregg. The film stars Bob Steele, Thomas G. Lingham, Jay Morley, Perry Murdock, Lafe McKee and Thelma Daniels. The film was released on April 7, 1929, by Film Booking Offices of America.

== Cast ==
- Bob Steele as Jimmy Hobbs
- Thomas G. Lingham as George Hobbs
- Jay Morley as Bill Wharton
- Perry Murdock as Haywire
- Lafe McKee as Phil Dunning
- Thelma Daniels as Alice Dunning
- Emily Gerdes as Myrtle

== Preservation ==
With no holdings located in archives, The Amazing Vagabond is considered a lost film.
