= Terror Mountain =

1928 film

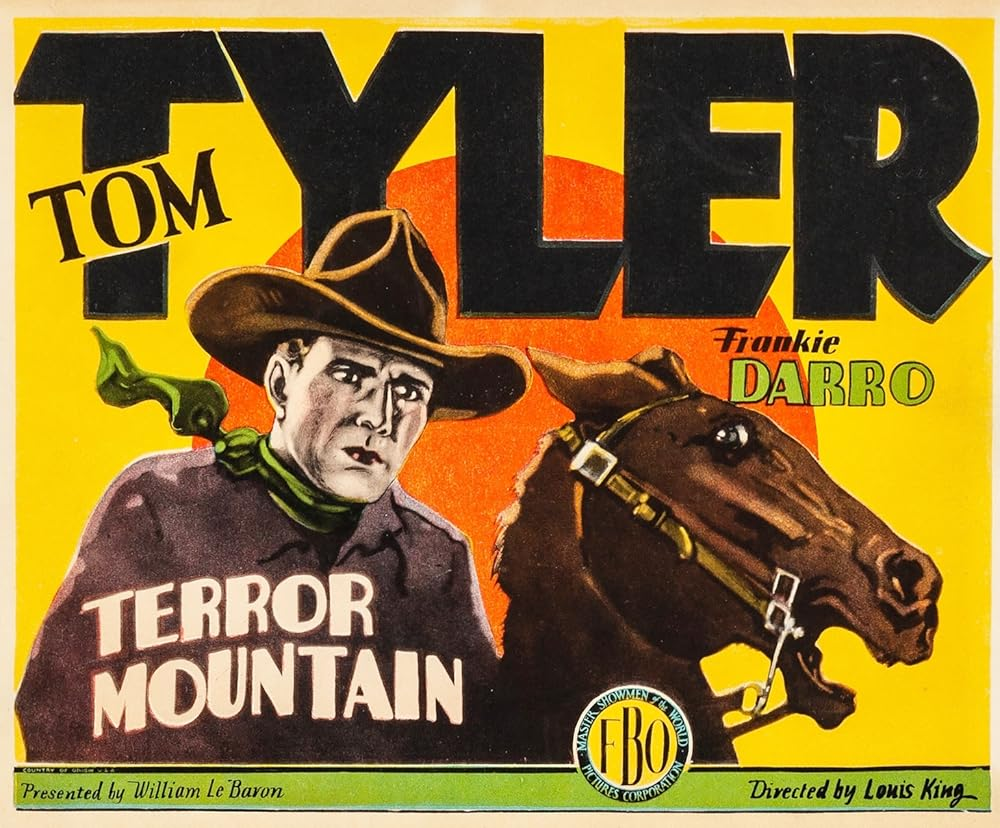
- Directed by: Louis King
- Screenplay by: Frank Howard Clark; Helen Gregg
- Story by: Wyndham Gittens
- Starring: Tom Tyler; Jane Reid; Al Ferguson; Jules Cowles; Frankie Darro
- Cinematography: Nicholas Musuraca
- Edited by: Della M. King
- Production company: Film Booking Offices of America
- Distributed by: Film Booking Offices of America
- Release date: August 19, 1928
- Running time: 60 minutes
- Country: United States
- Languages: Silent; English intertitles

Terror Mountain is a 1928 American silent Western film directed by Louis King and written by Frank Howard Clark and Helen Gregg. The film stars Tom Tyler, Jane Reid, Al Ferguson, Jules Cowles and Frankie Darro. The film was released on August 19, 1928, by Film Booking Offices of America. It was also released as Terror and Tom's Vacation.

== Plot ==
Two young orphans, Buddy and Lucille Roberts, living in an old dark mansion atop a mountain are assailed regularly by ghostly apparitions and mysterious death threats. They enlist the aid of a famous Hollywood Western movie star named Tom Tyler (with Tyler actually playing himself in the film) to investigate the situation and help them discover who is menacing them. It turns out a bunch of crooks have been using the old house as a hideout, and they were the ones trying to scare the kids into leaving so that the children would never discover the valuable cache of silver hidden years before in the house by their deceased uncle. Tyler captures the gang and turns them over to the authorities, then makes sure the siblings get their uncle's valuable stash. He caps off the film by adopting the two misfortunates and relocating them to his beautiful Hollywood estate.

== Cast ==
- Tom Tyler as Tom Tyler
- Jane Reid as Lucille Roberts
- Al Ferguson as Luke Thorne
- Jules Cowles as Jed Burke
- Frankie Darro as Buddy Roberts
