= Shadow Ranch (film) =

1930 film

- Theatrical release poster
- Directed by: Louis King
- Written by: Frank Howard Clark (screenplay); George M. Johnson (story "Shadow Ranch"); Clarke Silvernail (dialogue)
- Produced by: Sol Lesser (producer); Harry Cohn (executive producer) (uncredited)
- Cinematography: Ted D. McCord
- Edited by: James Sweeney
- Distributed by: Columbia Pictures
- Release date: September 28, 1930
- Running time: 64 minutes
- Country: United States
- Language: English

Shadow Ranch is a 1930 American pre-Code Western film directed by Louis King.

The Library of Congress Packard holds a print of the film.

== Cast ==
- Buck Jones as Sim Baldwin (as Charles 'Buck' Jones)
- Marguerite De La Motte as Ruth Cameron
- Kate Price as Maggie Murphy
- Albert J. Smith as Dan Blake (as Al Smith)
- Robert McKenzie as Lawyer
- Frank Rice as Ranny Williams
- Ben Corbett as Cowhand Ben
- Ernie Adams as Henchman Joe
- Slim Whitaker as Henchman Curley
