= Laughing at Death =

1929 film

- Directed by: Wallace Fox
- Written by: Frank Howard Clark; Helen Gregg
- Starring: Bob Steele; Natalie Joyce
- Cinematography: Virgil Miller
- Edited by: Della M. King
- Distributed by: Film Booking Offices of America
- Release date: June 9, 1929
- Running time: 60 minutes
- Country: United States
- Language: Silent

Laughing at Death is a 1929 American film directed by Wallace Fox for Film Booking Offices of America. The script was written by Frank Howard Clark and Helen Gregg, and the film stars Bob Steele and Natalie Joyce.

== Plot ==
A young American college athlete meets the prince of a European country while spending time on an ocean liner over his summer vacation. The two look practically identical, and he agrees to help the prince escape a plot against him by switching places for a period of time. Trouble ensues.

== Cast ==
- Bob Steele as Bob Thornton
- Natalie Joyce as Sonia Petrovich
- Captain Vic as Alexis
- Kai Schmidt as Emil Orloff
- Ethan Laidlaw as Karl Petrovich
