= Trail of Courage =

1928 film

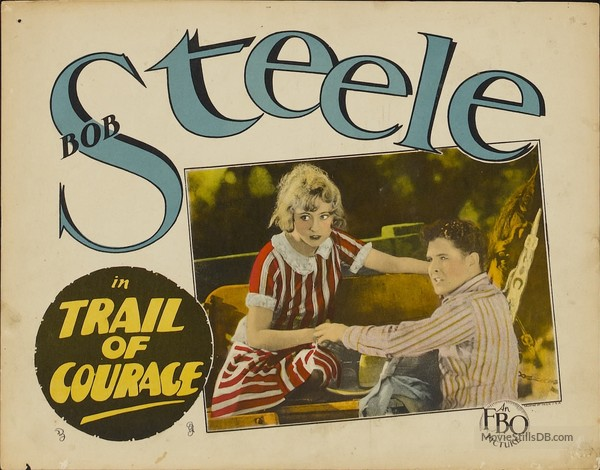
- Directed by: Wallace Fox
- Written by: Frank Howard Clark; Helen Gregg
- Starring: Bob Steele; Marjorie Bonner; Thomas G. Lingham
- Cinematography: Roy Eslick
- Edited by: Della M. King
- Production company: Film Booking Offices of America
- Distributed by: Film Booking Offices of America
- Release date: July 8, 1928
- Running time: 50 minutes
- Country: United States
- Languages: Silent; English intertitles

Trail of Courage is a 1928 American silent Western film directed by Wallace Fox and starring Bob Steele, Marjorie Bonner, and Thomas G. Lingham.

== Cast ==
- Bob Steele as Tex Reeves
- Marjorie Bonner as Ruth Tobin
- Thomas G. Lingham as Jack Tobin
- Jay Morley as Chili Burns
