= The Little Savage (1929 film) =

- Directed by: Louis King
- Written by: Frank Howard Clark
- Starring: Buzz Barton; Milburn Morante; Willard Boelner
- Cinematography: Virgil Miller
- Edited by: George Marsh
- Production company: Film Booking Offices of America
- Distributed by: RKO Pictures
- Release date: May 19, 1929
- Running time: 6 reels
- Country: United States
- Language: Silent (English intertitles)

The Little Savage is a 1929 western film directed by Louis King. It was produced by Film Booking Offices of America.

== Cast ==
- Buzz Barton as Red
- Milburn Morante as Hank
- Willard Boelner as Baby
- Margaret Gibson as Kitty
- Sam Nelson as Norton
- Ethan Laidlaw as Blake

== Reception ==
A contemporary review in the Bangor Daily Commercial called it a "thrilling story" that Buzz Barton fans would enjoy.

A Contemporary review in Variety was more critical. The reviewer called the story "sloppy and quickie". Furthermore, the reviewer thought the action was "so slow that a couple of reels seem to be centered on a few stills".
