= Wild Horse Valley =

Wild Horse Valley may refer to:

- Wild Horse Valley (film), 1940 American B-Western with Bob Steele
- Wild Horse Valley AVA, 1968 American Viticultural Area in Northern California
