= The Slingshot Kid =

1927 film

- Directed by: Louis King
- Screenplay by: Oliver Drake
- Story by: John Twist; Jean DuPont Miller
- Starring: Buzz Barton; Frank Rice; Jean Fenwick; Buck Connors; Jay Morley; Arnold Gray
- Cinematography: Roy Eslick; William Nobles
- Production company: Film Booking Offices of America
- Distributed by: Film Booking Offices of America
- Release date: December 4, 1927
- Running time: 50 minutes
- Country: United States
- Languages: Silent; English intertitles

The Slingshot Kid is a 1927 American silent Western film directed by Louis King and written by Oliver Drake. The film stars Buzz Barton, Frank Rice, Jean Fenwick, Buck Connors, Jay Morley, and Arnold Gray. The film was released on December 4, 1927, by Film Booking Offices of America.

== Cast ==
- Buzz Barton as Red Hepner
- Frank Rice as Toby
- Jean Fenwick as Betty
- Buck Connors as Clem Windloss
- Jay Morley as Santa Fe Sullivan
- Arnold Gray as Foreman
