= Rough Ridin' Red =

1928 film

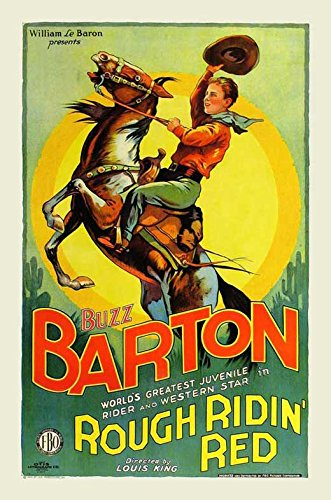
- Directed by: Louis King
- Written by: Frank Howard Clark; Helen Gregg
- Produced by: William LeBaron
- Starring: Buzz Barton; Frank Rice; Ethan Laidlaw
- Cinematography: Nicholas Musuraca
- Production company: Film Booking Offices of America
- Distributed by: Film Booking Offices of America
- Release date: November 4, 1928
- Running time: 50 minutes
- Country: United States
- Languages: Silent; English intertitles

Rough Ridin' Red is a 1928 American silent Western film directed by Louis King and starring Buzz Barton, Frank Rice and Ethan Laidlaw.

== Cast ==
- Buzz Barton as David 'Red' Hepner
- Frank Rice as Hank Robbins
- Jim Welch as Pap Curtis
- Bert Moorhouse as Sheriff Jerry Martin
- Ethan Laidlaw as Cal Rogers
- Betty Welsh

== Bibliography ==
- Langman, Larry. A Guide to Silent Westerns. Greenwood Publishing Group, 1992.
