= Pals of the Prairie =

1929 film

- Directed by: Louis King
- Written by: Frank Howard Clark, Oliver Drake
- Starring: Duncan Renaldo, Natalie Joyce
- Cinematography: Virgil Miller
- Edited by: George Marsh
- Music by: RCA Photophone
- Distributed by: Film Booking Offices of America
- Release date: 1929
- Running time: 57 minutes
- Country: United States
- Languages: Sound (Synchronized); English Intertitles

Pals of the Prairie is a 1929 American sound Western film intertwined with the romance of the mayor's daughter Dolores (Joyce) and Franciseo (Renaldo). While the film has no audible dialog, it was released with a synchronized musical score with sound effects using both the sound-on-disc and sound-on-film process. The sound was recorded using the RCA Photophone process and then transferred to sound-on-disc format for those theatres who could only play the sound-on-disc format.

== Plot ==
Red Hepner (Buzz Barton), a lively western youth, and his older sidekick Hank Robbins (Frank Rice), amble into Cajon, a dusty little Mexican village. The townsfolk live in fear of a masked outlaw known only as El Lobo, whose raids and threats have paralyzed the community.

While resting in the plaza, Red and Hank notice a tender meeting between Dolores (Natalie Joyce), the lovely daughter of a respected townsman, and Francisco Valencia (Duncan Renaldo), son of the proud mayor Don José Valencia (Thomas G. Lingham). The two young lovers’ happiness is shadowed by Don José’s disapproval—he favors instead the wealthy American suitor, Peter Sangor (Bill Patton), whose sinister demeanor fails to impress the spirited Red.

When Sangor arrogantly intrudes upon Dolores and Francisco, Red mischievously pelts him with tomatoes from a nearby cart. The prank causes an uproar in the square. Sangor, seething with humiliation, demands the mayor punish the strangers. Red and Hank are promptly thrown into the town jail, still grinning at their audacity.

Sangor, scheming to eliminate Francisco as a rival, convinces Don José of a ruse: if Francisco were “kidnapped” by El Lobo, Dolores would despair and consent to marry him instead. The mayor reluctantly agrees. To carry out the trick, Sangor arranges for Red and Hank’s release on the condition that they lure Francisco to a secluded spot.

But the pals, loyal at heart, immediately warn Francisco of the plot and pledge to protect him. Their warning comes too late—Sangor’s men ambush them, and Francisco is captured.

Sangor rushes to Don José with fabricated evidence that Red and Hank betrayed Francisco to El Lobo. Soon after, the outlaw chief demands 20,000 pesos ransom. The townsfolk believe the Americans are complicit in the crime. Red and Hank narrowly fight their way out of custody, determined to clear their names by rescuing Francisco themselves.

Disguising themselves as rough riders, the two pals infiltrate the bandit camp in the hills. To their shock, they discover the truth—Sangor and El Lobo are one and the same man. His duplicity exposed, Sangor unmasks before them, laughing cruelly, and orders his henchmen to throw the intruders into the cell where Francisco languishes.

Before Francisco is dragged away again, he whispers that he has loosened one of the iron bars on the cell window. Red and Hank seize the chance, slipping through the opening to freedom. Red races back toward Cajon for help, while Hank stays behind to shadow the bandits.

At the Valencia hacienda, Sangor presses his suit violently upon Dolores, who resists his advances. In the adjoining room, Francisco, bound to a chair, struggles in vain to free himself. Hank bursts in, knocks Sangor sprawling, and slashes Francisco’s bonds. Just as freedom seems within reach, Sangor’s henchmen pour in.

A furious melee erupts. Francisco is struck down and rendered unconscious in the fray. Hank, outnumbered, battles valiantly until Red arrives with Don José and a troop of rurales (mounted police). The rurales rout the outlaws and Sangor/El Lobo is finally unmasked before the whole town.

In gratitude, Don José tells Red and Hank to name their reward for saving his son and capturing the bandit chief. The two refuse riches or honors, instead asking only that Don José consent to Francisco and Dolores’s marriage.

Reluctantly, but with pride, the mayor agrees, blessing the young couple’s union. With their mission accomplished, Red and Hank mount their horses and ride off cheerfully toward the border, ready for their next adventure.

== Cast ==
- Natalie Joyce as Dolores
- Duncan Renaldo as Francisco
- Bill Patton as Pete Sangor
- Buzz Barton as Red Hepner
- Frank Rice as Hank Robbins
- Thomas G. Lingham as Don José Valencia

== See also ==
- List of early sound feature films (1926–1929)
