= Helen Gregg =

American screenwriter

- Occupation: Screenwriter

Helen Gregg was an American screenwriter active in the late 1920s. She was primarily responsible for writing intertitles on Westerns.

== Selected filmography ==
- Pals of the Prairie (1929)
- The Pride of Pawnee (1929)
- Laughing at Death (1929)
- Idaho Red (1929)
- The Vagabond Cub (1929)
- The Amazing Vagabond (1929)
- Gun Law (1929)
- The One Man Dog (1929)
- Outlawed (1929)
- Trail of the Horse Thieves (1929)
- Orphan of the Sage (1928)
- Stolen Love (1928)
- King Cowboy (1928)
- Rough Ridin' Red (1928)
- Tracked (1928)
- Young Whirlwind (1928)
- Dog Law (1928)
- Terror Mountain (1928)
- Trail of Courage (1928)
