= Headin' for Danger =

1928 film

- Directed by: Robert N. Bradbury
- Written by: Frank Howard Clark
- Starring: Bob Steele; Jola Mendez; Al Ferguson
- Cinematography: Virgil Miller
- Edited by: Della M. King
- Production company: Film Booking Offices of America
- Distributed by: Film Booking Offices of America
- Release date: December 16, 1928 (United States)
- Country: United States
- Languages: Silent; English intertitles

Headin' for Danger (also known as Asking for Trouble) is a 1928 American silent Western film directed by Robert N. Bradbury for Film Booking Offices of America (FBO) and commercially released in the United States on December 16, 1928. The film was written by Frank Howard Clark and stars Bob Steele, Jola Mendez and Al Ferguson.

== Cast ==
- Bob Steele as Jimmy Marshall
- Jola Mendez as Chiquita Ramerez
- Al Ferguson as Edward Thorpe
- Tom B. Forman as Bill Braxton/ El Toro
- Frank Rice as Andy Johnson
- Harry DeRoy as Pedro

== See also ==
- Bob Steele filmography
