= George Metcalf Johnson =

American writer (1885–1965)

George Metcalf Johnson (February 13, 1885 – December 14, 1965) was an American writer of mystery and western stories. Many of his westerns were published under the name George Metcalf.

He was born in Yankton, South Dakota, and was educated at Yale University. He taught school in New Haven, Connecticut. In 1910, two of his stories—Surelock Homes' Waterloo, a Sherlock Holmes parody, and The Crimson Call—were published in Top-Notch Magazine. In 1911, his stories At Rattlesnake Pool and Jumbo - Catching Fish with Brains appeared in The American Boy. Other stories were published in various pulp magazines, such as Popular Detective, Soldier of Fortune, Rangeland Love Stories, Romance Round-Up, Riders of the Range, People's Magazine, Munsey's Magazine. Dime Sports Magazine, Ace-High Magazine and Thrilling Ranch Stories. He married Marjorie Thatcher in 1917.

Johnson published his first book, The Gunslinger, in 1927. This was followed by Jerry Rides the Range and Riders of the Trail in 1927, Open Range in 1935 and The Saddle Bum in 1936. He also continued to produce short stories.

His story Shadow Ranch was the basis for a 1930 film of the same name directed by Louis King.
