= The Pinto Kid =

The Pinto Kid may refer to:

- The Pinto Kid (1928 film), a silent western film directed by Louis King
- The Pinto Kid (1941 film), a western film directed by Lambert Hillyer
