= Frank Rice (actor) =

American actor (1892–1936)

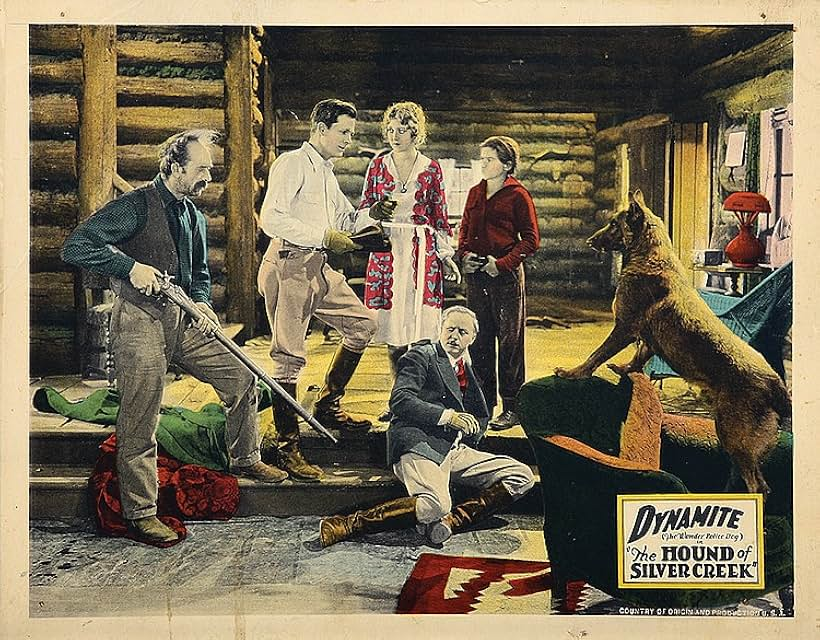
- Lobby card showing Rice (at left) in The Hound of Silver Creek (1928)
- Born: May 13, 1892; Muskegon, Michigan, US
- Died: January 9, 1936 (aged 43); Los Angeles, California, US
- Years active: 1912-1936

Frank Rice (May 13, 1892 – January 9, 1936) was an American film actor. He appeared in more than 120 films between 1912 and 1936. He was born in Muskegon, Michigan, and died in Los Angeles, California of hepatitis. Rice was educated in Portland, Oregon.

== Selected filmography ==
- Richelieu (1914) - Huget
- A Man from Nowhere (1920) - Toby Jones
- Riders of the Law (1922) - Toby Jones
- The Forbidden Trail (1923) - Toby Jones
- Blood Test (1923)
- Desert Rider (1923) - Toby Jones
- The Ghost City (1923) - Sagebrush Hilton
- The Red Warning (1923) - Toby Jones
- Wanted by the Law (1924) - Jerry Hawkins
- The Galloping Ace (1924) - Knack Williams
- Wolves of the North (1924) - Dan Martin
- Dynamite Dan (1924) - Boss
- The Ridin' Kid from Powder River (1924) - Cal Huxley
- The Air Hawk (1924) - Hank
- The Cloud Rider (1925) - Hank Higgins
- Ridin' Pretty (1925) - Barb Wire
- Just Plain Folks (1925)
- Riders of Mystery (1925) - Jerry Jones
- Moccasins (1925) - 'Hard Tack' Avery, the sheriff
- The Speed Demon (1925) - Col. Warren's butler
- The Gold Rush (1925) - Man in Dance Hall (uncredited)
- Spook Ranch (1925) - Sheriff
- Two-Fisted Jones (1925) - Old Bill
- The Call of Courage (1925) - Slim
- The Fighting Buckaroo (1926) - Any Parker
- The Border Sheriff (1926) - Marsh Hewitt
- Daniel Boone Thru the Wilderness (1926) - Hank Vaughan
- The Fighting Peacemaker (1926) - Sheriff
- With Davy Crockett at the Fall of the Alamo (1926) - Lige Beardsley
- Flying High (1926) - Haines - the Mechanic
- Red Signals (1927) - The Professor
- Tom's Gang (1927) - Andy Barker
- Three Miles Up (1927) - Professor
- The Boy Rider (1927) - Hank Robbins
- Wolf Fangs (1927) - Pete
- The Slingshot Kid (1927) - Toby
- Won in the Clouds (1928) - Percy Hogan
- The Pinto Kid (1928) - Hank Robbins
- The Hound of Silver Creek (1928) - Slim Terwilliger
- A Thief in the Dark (1928)
- The Bantam Cowboy (1928) - Sidewinder Steve
- Young Whirlwind (1928) - Hank
- Rough Ridin' Red (1928) - Hank Robbins
- Headin' for Danger (1928) - Andy Johnson
- Orphan of the Sage (1928) - Hank Robbins
- The Vagabond Cub (1929) - Hank Robbins
- The Lawless Legion (1929) - Flapjack
- The Royal Rider (1929) - Wild West Show Member
- The Overland Telegraph (1929) - Easy
- Stairs of Sand (1929) - Stage Driver
- Pals of the Prairie (1929) - Hank Robbins
- The Wagon Master (1929) - Grasshoper Jim
- Parade of the West (1930) - Snuffy
- The Fighting Legion (1930) - Cloudy Jones
- The Arizona Kid (1930) - Stage Driver (uncredited)
- Mountain Justice (1930) - Man at Dance (uncredited)
- Song of the Caballero (1930) - Andrea
- Sons of the Saddle (1930) - Cowhand (uncredited)
- The Storm (1930) - Pool Player (uncredited)
- Shadow Ranch (1930) - Ranny Williams
- Whoopee! (1930) - Cowhand Cook (uncredited)
- The Conquering Horde (1931) - Spud Grogan
- Riders of the North (1931) - The Parson
- The Squaw Man (1931) - Grouchy
- Border Law (1931) - Thunder Rogers
- Freighters of Destiny (1931) - Rough
- Shotgun Pass (1931) - Sagebrush
- Corsair (1931) - Fish Face
- Mounted Fury (1931) - Sandy McNab
- The False Madonna (1931) - Bus Driver (uncredited)
- The Sunset Trail (1932) - Taterbug Watson
- The Menace (1932) - Jim (uncredited)
- Polly of the Circus (1932) - Billboard Poster (uncredited)
- Love Affair (1932) - Eddie - Aviator (uncredited)
- The Wet Parade (1932) - Expectant Father / Bootleg Thug (uncredited)
- Sky Bride (1932) - House Detective (uncredited)
- Strangers of the Evening (1932) - Policeman (uncredited)
- Mystery Ranch (1932) - Tex - Barfly (uncredited)
- Hello Trouble (1932) - Hardpan - the Cook
- Horse Feathers (1932) - Doorman at Speakeasy (uncredited)
- Pack Up Your Troubles (1932) - Perkins (uncredited)
- Tess of the Storm Country (1932) - Thug (uncredited)
- Forbidden Trail (1932) - Sheriff Hibbs
- Robbers' Roost (1932) - Daniels (uncredited)
- The Thundering Herd (1933) - Blacksmith
- Phantom Thunderbolt (1933) - Nevady
- Somewhere in Sonora (1933) - Riley
- King of the Arena (1933) - Tin Star
- Horse Play (1933) - Farmer (uncredited)
- The Fiddlin' Buckaroo (1933) - Banty
- Her First Mate (1933) - Sailor on Whaler (uncredited)
- The Trail Drive (1933) - Thirsty
- Penthouse (1933) - Unknown Man on Phone (uncredited)
- Wheels of Destiny (1934) - Pinwheel
- David Harum (1934) - Robinson (uncredited)
- Wharf Angel (1934) - Sailor on 'The Coyote' (uncredited)
- The Fighting Ranger (1934) - Thunder, Texas Ranger
- The Last Round-Up (1934) - Shrimp
- Charlie Chan's Courage (1934) - Prospector
- The Red Rider (1934, Serial) - Deputy Harp Harris [Chs. 1-2, 15] (uncredited)
- The Notorious Sophie Lang (1934) - Cop (uncredited)
- You Belong to Me (1934) - Stagehand (uncredited)
- Wagon Wheels (1934) - Settler (uncredited)
- Belle of the Nineties (1934) - Best Man at Wedding (uncredited)
- Terror of the Plains (1934) - Banty - Tom's Sidekick
- One Hour Late (1934) - Engineer (uncredited)
- Loser's End (1935) - Amos Butts
- Ruggles of Red Gap (1935) - Hank Adams (uncredited)
- Princess O'Hara (1935) - Laramie Pink (uncredited)
- Stone of Silver Creek (1935) - Tom Lucas
- Public Hero No. 1 (1935) - Cab Driver (uncredited)
- Border Brigands (1935) - Rocky O'Leary, RCMP
- Hard Rock Harrigan (1935) - McClintock - Superindendant
- Trails of the Wild (1935) - Missouri
- Cheers of the Crowd (1935) - (uncredited)
- The Public Menace (1935) - Policeman (uncredited)
- Powdersmoke Range (1935) - Sourdough Jenkins (uncredited)
- She Couldn't Take It (1935) - Milkman (uncredited)
- Barbary Coast (1935) - Miner (uncredited)
- Valley of Wanted Men (1935) - Ned (Storekeeper)
- The Ivory-Handled Gun (1935) - Pike
- Nevada (1935) - Shorty
- Too Tough to Kill (1935) - Swede Mulhauser (uncredited)
- The Oregon Trail (1936) - Red
- The Trail of the Lonesome Pine (1936) - Zeke Denker
