= The Vagabond Cub =

1929 film

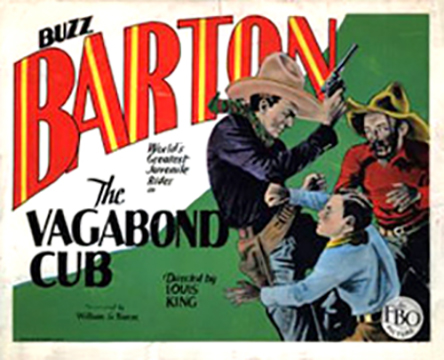
- Directed by: Louis King
- Written by: Oliver Drake; Helen Gregg
- Starring: Buzz Barton; Frank Rice; Sam Nelson
- Cinematography: Virgil Miller
- Edited by: Jack Kitchin
- Production company: Film Booking Offices of America
- Distributed by: Film Booking Offices of America
- Release date: February 10, 1929
- Running time: 60 minutes
- Country: United States
- Languages: Silent; English intertitles

The Vagabond Cub is a 1929 American silent Western film directed by Louis King and starring Buzz Barton, Frank Rice and Sam Nelson.

== Cast ==
- Buzz Barton as David 'Red' Hepner
- Frank Rice as Hank Robbins
- Sam Nelson as Bob McDonald
- Al Ferguson as James Sykes
- Bill Patton as Pete Hogan
- Milburn Morante as Dan Morgan
- Ione Holmes as June Morgan

== Bibliography ==
- Munden, Kenneth White. The American Film Institute Catalog of Motion Pictures Produced in the United States, Part 1. University of California Press, 1997.
