= Breed of the West =

1930 film

- Lobby card
- Directed by: Alan James
- Screenplay by: Alan James
- Story by: Alan James; Henry Taylor
- Starring: Hal Taliaferro; Virginia Brown Faire; Buzz Barton
- Cinematography: William Nobles
- Edited by: Ethel Davey
- Production companies: National Players; Big 4 Film Corp.
- Distributed by: Big 4 Film Corp.
- Release date: November 12, 1930 (US)
- Running time: 6 reels
- Country: United States
- Language: English

Breed of the West is a 1930 American pre-Code Western film directed by Alan James, starring Hal Taliaferro, Virginia Brown Faire, and Buzz Barton.

== Plot ==
Wally Weldon works as a ranch hand on Colonel Jim Sterner's ranch, reporting in to Longrope Wheeler, the foreman, and someone who Sterner trusts implicitly. One day while out on the range, Weldon comes across Jim Bradley, a young man who Weldon learns is searching for his father. Taking pity on the youth, he brings him back to the ranch, where he knows there's an opening as a cook's helper.

One day, Bradley walks in on Longrope and the cook trying to open Sterner's safe and rob him. Bradley attempts to get away, but is shot by the cook, who then attempts to flee himself. Weldon hunts the cook down and captures him, delivering him to the local sheriff. Back at the ranch, seeing Bradley in bed, Sterner realizes that he is his long lost son.

In jail the cook admits to shooting Bradley, and also tells the sheriff that he knows that Longrope was the man who murdered a cattle association representative. Weldon rushes back to the ranch, where he finds Longrope trying once again to open the safe. Weldon overpowers him, and takes him back to the sheriff.

== Cast ==
- Hal Taliaferro (credited Wally Wales) as Wally Weldon
- Virginia Brown Faire as Betty Sterner
- Buzz Barton as Jim Sterner
- Robert Walker as Longrope Wheeler
- Lafe McKee as Colonel Sterner
- Bobby Dunn as Shorty
- George Gerwin as The cook
- Hank Bell as Sheriff Cole
- Edmund Cobb as Tom Hardy
- Bud Osborne as Harry Barnes
- Ben Corbett as Deputy
- Frank Ellis as Deputy
- Slim Whitaker as Henchman Slim
- Art Mix as Henchman Art
- Bob Burns as Cowboy Bob
- Fred Burns as Townsman

== Production ==
Big 4 began casting the film in Mid-September 1930, in which Wally Wales was scheduled to star. They selected Bud Osborne and Edmund Cobb to join the cast. The picture was originally scheduled to be released on October 6. In early October the release date got pushed back to October 30, and finally pushed back again to November 12, which was the actual release date.
