= The Lawless Legion =

1929 film

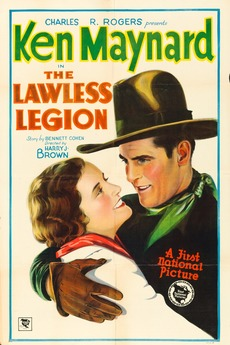
- Theatrical release poster
- Directed by: Harry Joe Brown
- Screenplay by: Bennett Cohen; Fred Allen; Leslie Mason
- Story by: Bennett Cohen
- Produced by: Charles R. Rogers
- Starring: Ken Maynard; Nora Lane; Paul Hurst; J. P. McGowan; Frank Rice; Howard Truesdale
- Cinematography: Frank B. Good
- Edited by: Fred Allen
- Production company: First National Pictures
- Distributed by: Warner Bros. Pictures
- Release date: February 17, 1929
- Running time: 70 minutes
- Country: United States
- Languages: Sound (Synchronized); English Intertitles

The Lawless Legion is a 1929 American synchronized sound Western film directed by Harry Joe Brown and written by Bennett Cohen, Fred Allen and Leslie Mason. While the film has no audible dialog, it was released with a synchronized musical score with sound effects using the Vitaphone sound-on-disc sound process. The film stars Ken Maynard, Nora Lane, Paul Hurst, J. P. McGowan, Frank Rice and Howard Truesdale. The film was released by Warner Bros. Pictures on February 17, 1929.

== Plot ==
In the vast cattle country, settlers face ruin as a prolonged drought withers the ranges and their cattle perish. The only hope lies in driving the herd across dangerous badlands to Grass Valley. However, the notorious cattle thief Ramirez and his gang make the journey perilous.

Flapjack suggests his friend Cal Stanley, currently jailed for disturbing the peace, as the man for the job. Although reluctant, Stanley agrees when Sheriff Jim Reiver's daughter Mary promises to marry him if he succeeds. Matson, secretly allied with Ramirez, opposes the plan and plots sabotage.

On the first night out, Stanley and his loyal horse Tarzan keep watch while the others rest. Matson drugs Stanley's coffee, causing him to pass out; his companions find him soaked in whiskey and suspect drunkenness. Ramirez's gang then ties up the men and steals the cattle.

With help from Flapjack, Stanley escapes and pursues the thieves alone. The other settlers, believing Stanley a deserter, return to town in anger. Disguised as a cattle buyer, Stanley confronts Ramirez, sparking a fierce fight. Though captured and tied to a wild horse, Tarzan rescues him just in time.

Stanley returns to Ramirez's camp, rounding up the cattle and his enemies. As he meets the returning ranchers, they initially mistake his herd for stolen stock but soon realize he has saved their livelihood. Stanley exposes Matson's betrayal, clearing his name. Mary understands and their love is rekindled, signaling a new beginning for the settlers.

== Cast ==
- Ken Maynard as Cal Stanley
- Nora Lane as Mary
- Paul Hurst as Ramirez
- J. P. McGowan as Matson
- Frank Rice as Flapjack
- Howard Truesdale as Sheriff Keiver
- Tarzan as Tarzan

== See also ==
- List of early sound feature films (1926–1929)
