= Desert Rider =

1923 Western film by Robert Bradbury

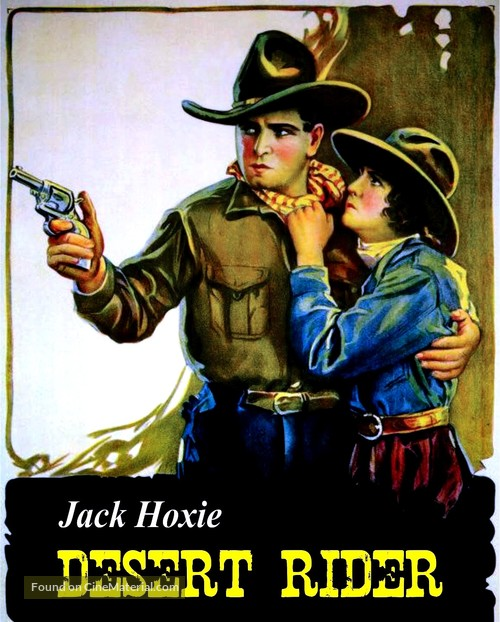
- Directed by: Robert N. Bradbury
- Written by: Frank Howard Clark
- Produced by: Anthony J. Xydias
- Starring: Jack Hoxie; Frank Rice; Evelyn Nelson
- Cinematography: Bert Longenecker
- Production company: Sunset Productions
- Distributed by: Aywon Film Corporation
- Release date: June 1923
- Running time: 50 minutes
- Country: United States
- Languages: Silent; English intertitles

Desert Rider is a 1923 American silent Western film directed by Robert N. Bradbury and starring Jack Hoxie, Frank Rice and Evelyn Nelson.

== Cast ==
- Jack Hoxie as Jack Sutherland
- Frank Rice as Toby Jones
- Evelyn Nelson as Carolyn Grey
- Claude Payton as Rufe Kinkaid
- Thomas G. Lingham as Dan Baird
- Walter Wilkinson as Mickey Baird
