= The Little Buckaroo =

1928 film

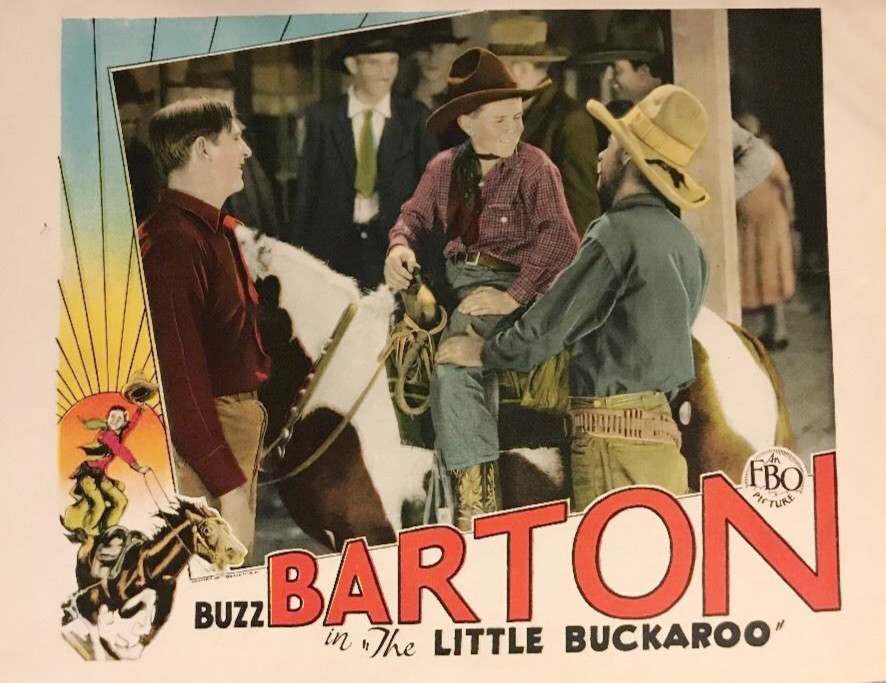
- Directed by: Louis King
- Written by: Frank Howard Clark; Oliver Drake
- Produced by: Robert N. Bradbury
- Starring: Buzz Barton; Milburn Morante; Peggy Shaw
- Cinematography: Roy Eslick
- Edited by: Della M. King
- Production company: Film Booking Offices of America
- Distributed by: Film Booking Offices of America
- Release date: February 25, 1928
- Running time: 50 minutes
- Country: United States
- Languages: Silent; English intertitles

The Little Buckaroo is a 1928 American silent Western film directed by Louis King and starring Buzz Barton, Milburn Morante and Peggy Shaw.

== Cast ==
- Buzz Barton as David 'Red' Hepner
- Milburn Morante as Toby Jones
- Peggy Shaw as Ann Crawford
- Kenneth MacDonald as Jack Pemberton
- Al Ferguson as Luke Matthews
- Walter Maly as Sam Baxter
- Bob Burns as Sheriff Al Durking
- Florence Lee as Mrs. Durking
- Jim Welch as Jim Crawford

== Preservation ==
With no holdings located in archives, The Little Buckaroo is considered a lost film.
