= The Busher =

1919 silent film by Jerome Storm

- Directed by: Jerome Storm
- Written by: R. Cecil Smith; Earle Snell
- Produced by: Thomas H. Ince
- Starring: Charles Ray; Colleen Moore; John Gilbert; Jay Morley
- Cinematography: Chester A. Lyons
- Production company: Famous Players–Lasky
- Distributed by: Paramount Pictures
- Release date: May 18, 1919
- Running time: 63 minutes
- Country: United States
- Language: Silent (English intertitles)

The Busher is a 1919 American drama film directed by Jerome Storm featuring Colleen Moore, and produced by Thomas H. Ince. The film still exists and is available on DVD from Kino Video, running 55 minutes. There is an alternate edition available from Grapevine Video. This version runs 63 minutes, including a longer opening exposition sequence, and more frequent original intertitles, which help to clarify the story. A print is also held by Gosfilmofond Russian State Archives.

== Plot ==
When the train transporting the St. Paul Pink Sox is delayed outside of Brownsville, the players exit the train for some exercise and end up playing a game with the locals. The manager is impressed with Ben Harding, inexperienced but talented pitcher for the Brownsville baseball team. Ben joins the team and leaves for the big city, promising his sweetheart Mazie Palmer that he will return for her.

However, success goes to his head and he forgets about his small-town roots. He ignores the hometown folk, including Mazie, when they come to the big city to see him play. Because he lives the fancy life, his pitching suffers and soon he is sent back home in shame. Ben vows never to play ball again, but discovering that Mazie's brother has bet their house on the championship game, with the home team behind, Ben returns to the mound, wins the game, the respect of the town, the love of Mazie, and a new contract from a Pink Sox representative who had been waiting for Ben to lose his conceit.

== Cast ==
- Charles Ray as Ben Harding
- Colleen Moore as Mazie Palmer
- Jack Gilbert as Jim Blair (credited as Jack Gilbert)
- Jay Morley as Billy Palmer
- Otto Hoffman as Deacon Nasby
- Jack Nelson (uncredited)
- Louis Durham (uncredited)
- Margaret Livingston (uncredited)

== See also ==
- List of baseball films
