= The Border Sheriff =

1926 film

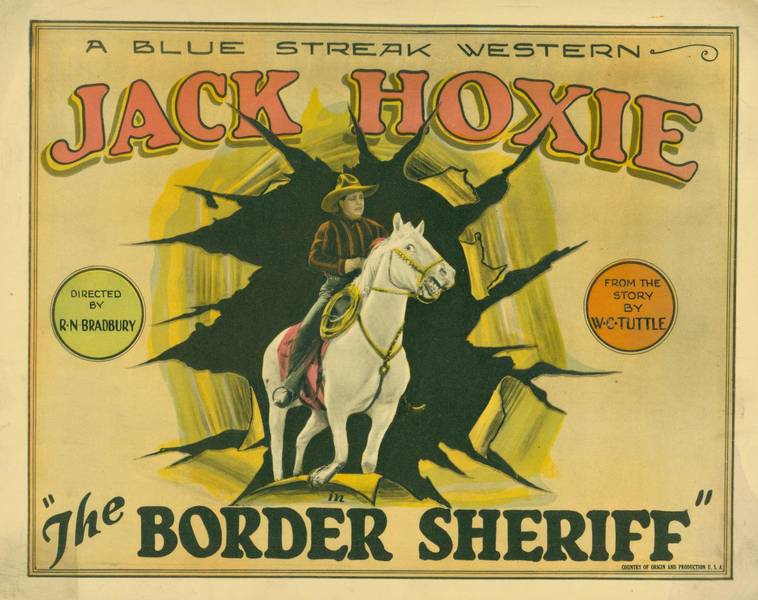
- Lobby card
- Directed by: Robert N. Bradbury
- Written by: Robert N. Bradbury
- Based on: "Straight Shootin'" by W. C. Tuttle
- Produced by: Carl Laemmle
- Starring: Jack Hoxie; Olive Hasbrouck; S.E. Jennings
- Cinematography: William Nobles; Harry Mason
- Production company: Universal Pictures
- Distributed by: Universal Pictures
- Release date: April 25, 1926
- Running time: 5 reels
- Country: United States
- Language: Silent (English intertitles)

The Border Sheriff is a 1926 American silent Western film directed by Robert N. Bradbury and starring Jack Hoxie, Olive Hasbrouck, and S.E. Jennings. A print of The Border Sheriff exists.

== Plot ==
As described in a film magazine review, Cultus Collins, the sheriff of Cayuse County, confers with the United States Secret Service in Washington regarding a gang smuggling dope from Mexico. The trail leads to Carter Brace in San Francisco, who is the business representative of Henry Belden. Sheriff Collins becomes acquainted with Henry and his daughter Joan, and foils an attempt to kidnap them in Chinatown. Later in Cayuse County, Collins frustrates the schemes of the gang, again saves both of the Beldens, and wins the affection of Joan.

== Cast ==
- Jack Hoxie as Sheriff Cultus Collins
- Olive Hasbrouck as Joan Belden
- S.E. Jennings as Carter Brace
- Gilbert Holmes as Tate 'Tater-bug' Cooper
- Buck Moulton as Limpy Peel
- Thomas G. Lingham as Henry Belden
- Bert De Marc as Joe Martinez
- Frank Rice as Marsh Hewitt
