= Jay Morley =

American actor

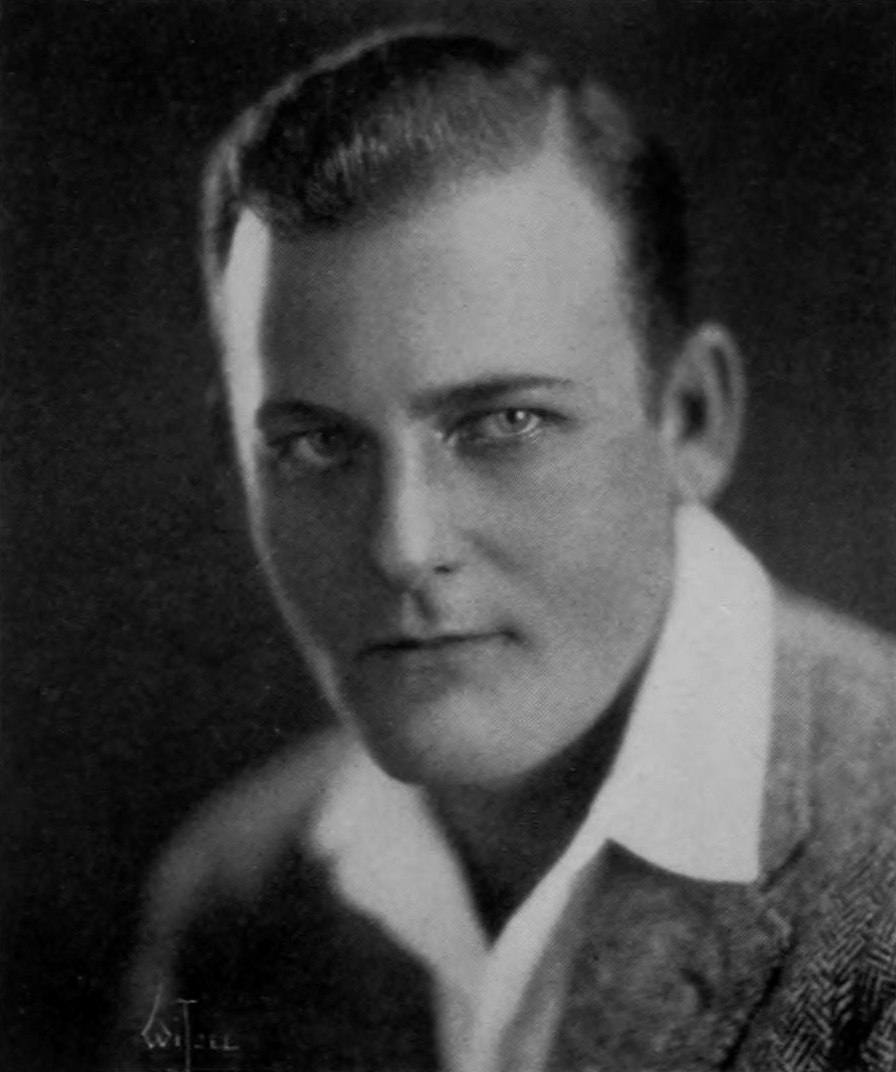
- Morley, photographed by Witzel Studios
- Born: July 14, 1890; Port Orange, Florida, U.S.
- Died: November 9, 1976 (aged 86); Santa Monica, California, U.S.
- Occupation: Actor
- Years active: 1913–1931, 1950–1951

Jay Morley (July 14, 1890 – November 9, 1976), was an American actor, active in silent films.

== Career ==
Morley began his acting career in a traveling vaudeville act and performed in dramas with stock theater companies for five years. He had success in silent films, but retired at the beginning of the sound era to serve as sheriff of Malibu. He returned to films and television in the early 1950s.

== Filmography ==
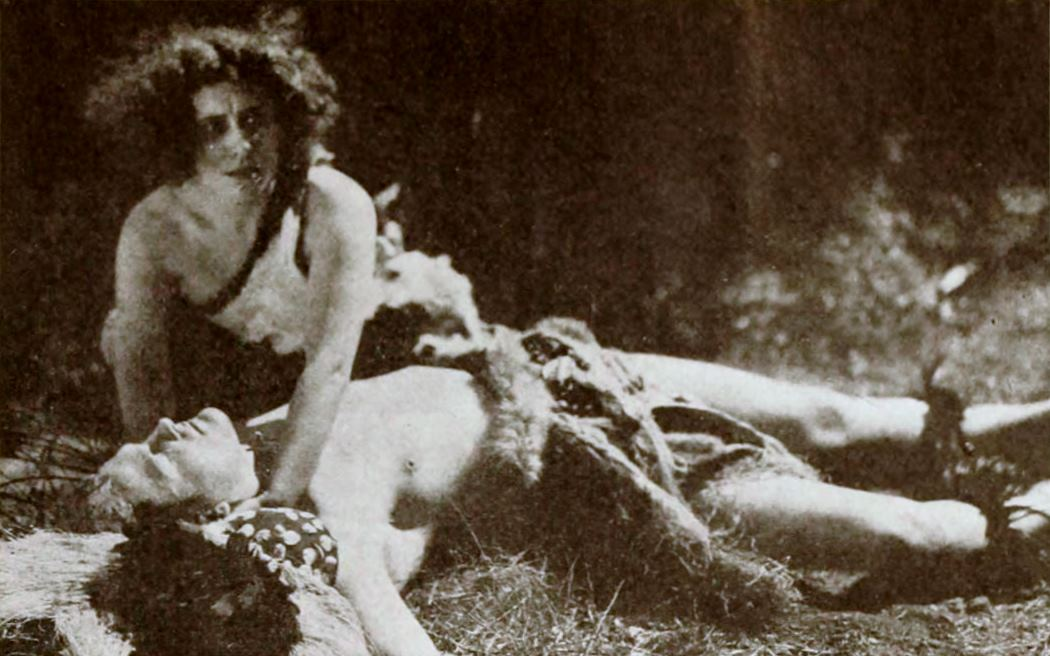
The Woman Untamed (1920)

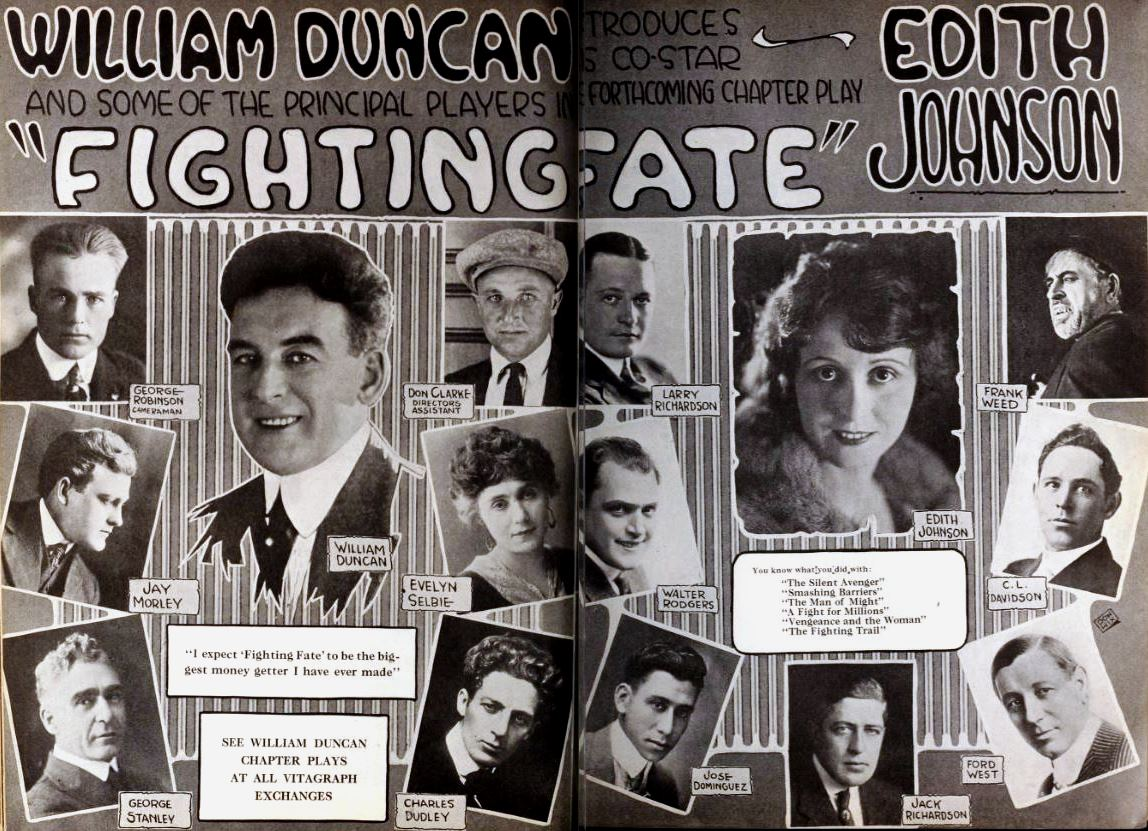
Fighting Fate (1921)

- The Man Who Tried to Forget (1913)
- Elsie Venner (1914)
- The Getaway (1914)
- The City (1914)
- Man to Man (1914)
- The Best Man (1914)
- The School Teacher at Angel Camp (1914)
- In the Background (1915)
- What Money Will Do (1915)
- The Discontented Man (1915)
- The Taunt (1915)
- The Red Virgin (1915)
- When the Wires Crossed (1915)
- The Emerald God (1915)
- The Lonely Fisherman (1915)
- A Night in Old Spain (1915)
- Margie of the Underworld (1915)
- The Death Web (1915)
- The Palace of Dust (1915)
- The New Adventures of Terence O'Rourke (1915)
- Meg o' the Cliffs (1915)
- When a Queen Loved O'Rourke (1915)
- The Legend of the Poisoned Pool (1915)
- With Stolen Money (1915)
- The Road to Paradise (1915)
- Saved from the Harem (1915)
- The Convict King (1915)
- The Lost Bracelet (1916)
- The Old Watchman (1916)
- The Little Sister of the Poor (1916)
- Two News Items (1916)
- A Modern Paul (1916)
- The Repentant (1916)
- At the Doors of Doom (1916)
- A Sister to Cain (1916)
- The Return of James Jerome (1916)
- One of the Pack (1916)
- The Candle (1916)
- The Beggar King (1916)
- The Half Wit (1916)
- By Right of Love (1916)
- Their Mother (1916)
- Who Knows? (1917)
- Loyalty (1917)
- Humility (1918)
- Blindfolded (1918)
- An Alien Enemy (1918)
- Ace High (1918)
- Todd of the Times (1919)
- The Usurper (1919)
- The Busher (1919)
- The Little Boss (1919)
- Over the Garden Wall (1919)
- A Fighting Colleen (1919)
- The Invisible Hand (1920)
- Pegeen (1920)
- Telemachus, Friend (1920)
- The Green Flame (1920)
- The Woman Untamed (1920)
- The Roads We Take (1920)
- The Call Loan (1920)
- Fighting Fate (1921)
- The Honor of Rameriz (1921)
- The Heart of Doreon (1921)
- Trailin' (1921)
- The Verdict (1922)
- In the Days of Buffalo Bill (1922)
- The Man Who Waited (1922)
- Crimson Gold (1923)
- Out of Luck (1923)
- Rustlin' (1923)
- Face to Face (1923)
- The Wolf Trapper (1923)
- No Tenderfoot (1923)
- The Twilight Trail (1923)
- Waterfront Wolves (1924)
- Paying the Limit (1924)
- Wanted by the Law (1924)
- Getting Her Man (1924)
- Three Days to Live (1924)
- Behind Two Guns (1924)
- Reckless Courage (1925)
- With Buffalo Bill on the U. P. Trail (1926)
- Daniel Boone Thru the Wilderness (1926)
- With Davy Crockett at the Fall of the Alamo (1926)
- Sitting Bull at the Spirit Lake Massacre (1927)
- The Mojave Kid (1927)
- The Slingshot Kid (1927)
- Driftin' Sands (1928)
- Man in the Rough (1928)
- Trail of Courage (1928)
- Come and Get It! (1929)
- The Amazing Vagabond (1929)
- Near the Trail's End (1931)
- The Lone Ranger (1950) – TV series
- Sunset Boulevard (1950)
- Dark City (1950)
- Mr. Music (1950)
- The Enforcer (1951)
- A Place in the Sun (1951)
