= The Lone Rider =

1930 film

- Directed by: Louis King
- Written by: Frank Howard Clark; Forrest Sheldon
- Produced by: Sol Lesser
- Starring: Buck Jones; Vera Reynolds; Harry Woods
- Cinematography: Ted D. McCord
- Edited by: James Sweeney
- Production company: Beverly Pictures
- Distributed by: Columbia Pictures
- Release date: 13 July 1930
- Running time: 57 minutes
- Country: United States
- Language: English

The Lone Rider is a 1930 American western film directed by Louis King and starring Buck Jones, Vera Reynolds and Harry Woods. It was remade twice by Columbia first as The Man Trailer (1934) and then The Thundering West (1939).

== Cast ==
- Buck Jones as Jim Lanning (as Charles 'Buck' Jones)
- Vera Reynolds as Mary Stevens
- Harry Woods as Ed Farrell
- George C. Pearce as Judge Stevens (as George Pearce)
- Tom Bay as Henchman Bull
- Buck Bucko as Henchman
- Roy Bucko as Henchman
- Bob Burns as Henchman
- Buck Connors as Townsman
- Jim Corey as Henchman
- Rube Dalroy as Pipe-Smoking Townsman
- Jack Kirk as Henchman
- Charles Le Moyne as Stage Guard
- Cliff Lyons as Henchman
- Jim Mason as Henchman
- Lafe McKee as Corwin
- Tex Phelps as Townsman
- George Plues as Henchman
- Blackjack Ward as Williams

== Bibliography ==
- Fetrow, Alan G. . Sound films, 1927-1939: a United States Filmography. McFarland, 1992.
- Pitts, Michael R. Western Movies: A Guide to 5,105 Feature Films. McFarland, 2012.
