= Danger Patrol (1928 film) =

1928 film

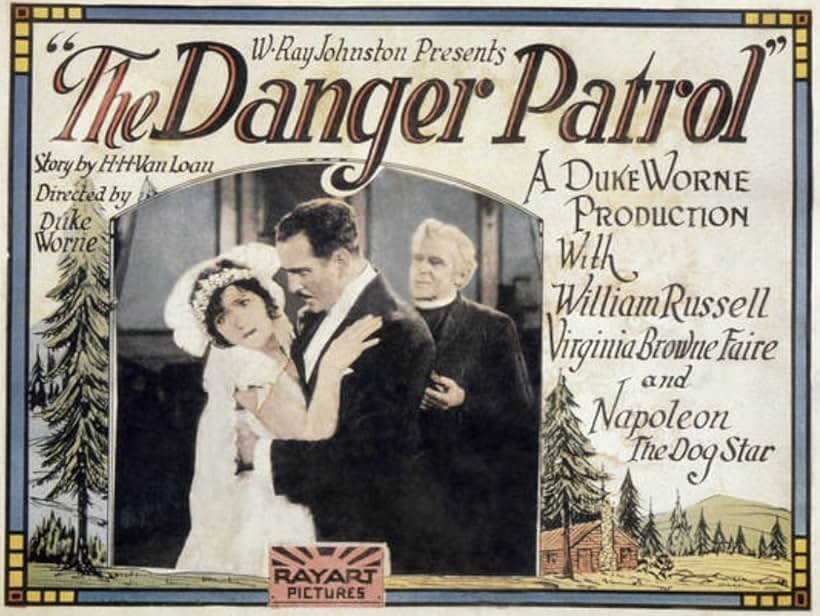
- Directed by: Duke Worne
- Written by: Arthur Hoerl; H.H. Van Loan
- Produced by: Duke Worne
- Starring: William Russell; Virginia Brown Faire; Wheeler Oakman
- Cinematography: Malcolm Sweeney
- Edited by: Walter L. Griffin
- Production company: Duke Worne Productions
- Distributed by: Rayart Pictures
- Release date: April 1928
- Running time: 50 minutes
- Country: United States
- Languages: Silent; English intertitles

Danger Patrol is a 1928 American silent Western film directed by Duke Worne and starring William Russell, Virginia Brown Faire and Wheeler Oakman.

== Cast ==
- William Russell as Sgt. John Daley
- Virginia Brown Faire as Céleste Gambier
- Wheeler Oakman as George Gambler
- Rhea Mitchell as Gladys Lawlor
- Ethan Laidlaw as 'Regina Jim' Lawlor
- S.D. Wilcox as André
