= Young Whirlwind =

1928 film

- Directed by: Louis King
- Written by: Ethel Hill; Helen Gregg; H.C. Schmidt
- Produced by: William LeBaron
- Starring: Buzz Barton; Edmund Cobb; Frank Rice
- Cinematography: Virgil Miller
- Edited by: George Marsh
- Production company: Film Booking Offices of America
- Distributed by: Film Booking Offices of America
- Release date: September 16, 1928
- Running time: 50 minutes
- Country: United States
- Languages: Silent; English intertitles

Young Whirlwind is a 1928 American silent Western film directed by Louis King and starring Buzz Barton, Edmund Cobb and Frank Rice.

== Cast ==
- Buzz Barton as David 'Red' Hepner
- Edmund Cobb as Jack
- Frank Rice as Hank
- Alma Rayford as Molly
- Thomas G. Lingham as Sheriff
- Eddy Chandler as Johnson
- Bill Patton as Bart
- Tex Phelps as Bandit

== Bibliography ==
- Darby, William. Masters of Lens and Light: A Checklist of Major Cinematographers and Their Feature Films. Scarecrow Press, 1991.
