= A Fighting Colleen =

1919 silent film by David Smith

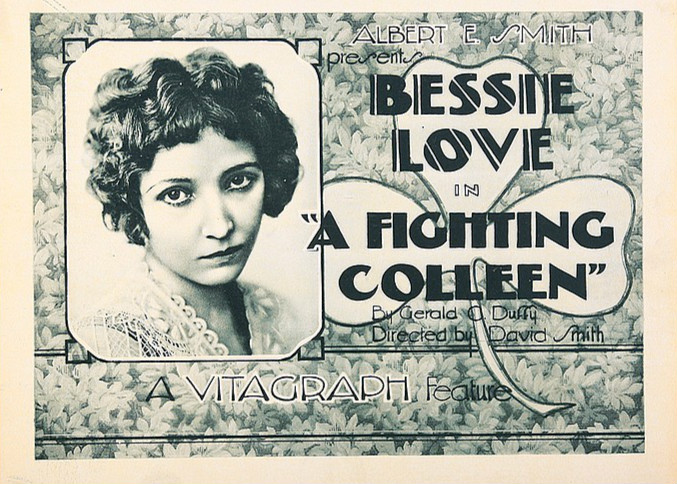
- Lobby card
- Directed by: David Smith
- Screenplay by: Gerald C. Duffy
- Story by: Gerald C. Duffy
- Starring: Bessie Love; Charles Spere
- Cinematography: Charles R. Seeling
- Production company: Vitagraph Company of America
- Release date: November 16, 1919 (U.S.)
- Running time: 5 reels; 4,471 feet
- Country: United States
- Language: Silent (English intertitles)

A Fighting Colleen is a 1919 American silent comedy-drama film directed by David Smith and produced by Vitagraph Company of America. It stars Bessie Love and Charles Spere.

The film is presumed lost.

== Plot ==
Alannah Malone, an Irish immigrant living in a tenement, who sells newspapers to make a living. When her mother dies, she engages in fistfights to defend her territory from newsboys. One particular newsboy falls for her after she beats him up. The tenement in which Alannah lives is owned by the city's unjust mayor. When the District Attorney announces his candidacy for mayor, Alannah aids his campaign by gathering evidence to expose the mayor as a hypocrite.

== Cast ==
- Bessie Love as Alannah Malone
- Anne Schaefer as Mother Malone
- Charles Spere as Jimmy Meehan
- Jay Morley as Stanton Colby
- George Kunkel as Mortimer Wall
- Beulah Clark as Maggie O'Higgins

== Reception ==
Press for the film likened it to Mary Pickford's Daddy Long Legs and Mabel Normand's Mickey. The film received positive reviews, and did well at the box office.
