= Wanted by the Law =

1924 film

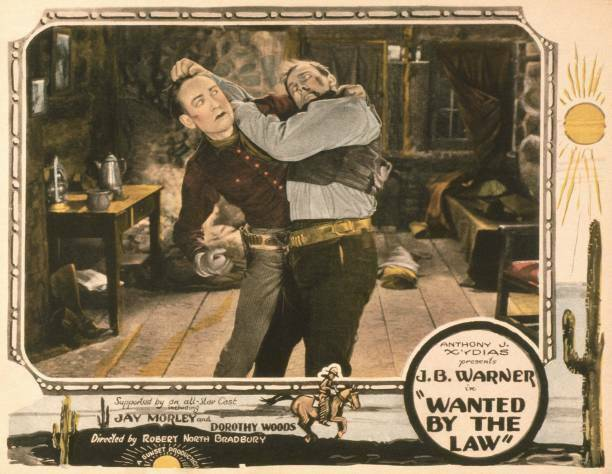
- Directed by: Robert N. Bradbury
- Written by: Robert N. Bradbury
- Produced by: Anthony J. Xydias
- Starring: J.B. Warner; Jay Morley; William McCall
- Cinematography: E.M. MacManigal
- Production company: Sunset Productions
- Distributed by: Aywon Film Corporation
- Release date: March 15, 1924
- Running time: 63 minutes
- Country: United States
- Languages: Silent; English intertitles

Wanted by the Law is a 1924 American silent Western film directed by Robert N. Bradbury and starring J.B. Warner, Jay Morley and William McCall.

== Cast ==
- J.B. Warner as Jim Loraine
- Jay Morley as Bill Baxter
- William McCall as Henchman Bush McGraw
- Frank Rice as Jerry Hawkins
- Thomas G. Lingham as Sheriff Rufe Matlock
- Dorothy Wood as Jessie Walton
- Jay Hunt as Sandy Walton
- Billie Bennett as Mrs. Loraine
- Ralph McCullough as Bud Loraine
- Jack Waltemeyer as Idaho Sheriff

== Bibliography ==
- Langman, Larry. A Guide to Silent Westerns. Greenwood Publishing Group, 1992.
