= Orphan of the Sage =

1928 film

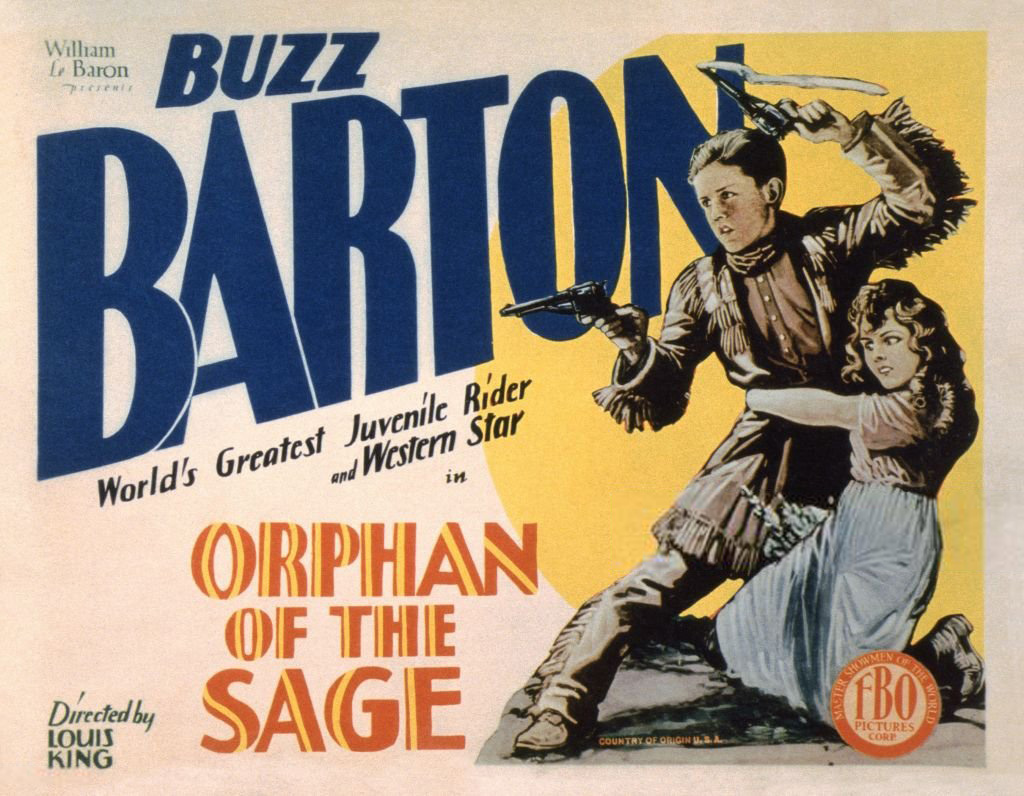
- Directed by: Louis King
- Written by: Oliver Drake; Helen Gregg
- Produced by: William LeBaron; Robert N. Bradbury
- Starring: Buzz Barton; Frank Rice; Thomas G. Lingham
- Cinematography: Nicholas Musuraca
- Edited by: Della M. King; Jack Kitchin
- Production company: Film Booking Offices of America
- Distributed by: Film Booking Offices of America
- Release date: December 23, 1928
- Running time: 60 minutes
- Country: United States
- Languages: Silent; English intertitles

Orphan of the Sage is a 1928 American silent Western film directed by Louis King and starring Buzz Barton, Frank Rice and Thomas G. Lingham.

== Cast ==
- Buzz Barton as David 'Red' Hepner
- Frank Rice as Hank Robbins
- Thomas G. Lingham as Jeff Perkins
- Annabelle Magnus as Mary Jane Perkins
- Bill Patton as 'Nevada' Naldene

== Bibliography ==
- Langman, Larry. A Guide to Silent Westerns. Greenwood Publishing Group, 1992.
