= The Boy Rider =

1927 film

- Directed by: Louis King
- Written by: Frank Howard Clark; Oliver Drake
- Produced by: Joseph P. Kennedy
- Starring: Buzz Barton; Lorraine Eason; Sam Nelson
- Cinematography: E.M. MacManigal
- Production company: Film Booking Offices of America
- Distributed by: Film Booking Offices of America
- Release date: October 23, 1927
- Running time: 50 minutes
- Country: United States
- Languages: Silent; English intertitles

The Boy Rider is a 1927 American silent Western film directed by Louis King and starring Buzz Barton, Lorraine Eason and Sam Nelson.

== Cast ==
- Buzz Barton as David Hepner
- Lorraine Eason as Sally Parker
- Sam Nelson as Terry McNeil
- David Dunbar as Bill Hargus
- Frank Rice as Hank Robbins
- William Ryno as Jim Parker

== Preservation ==
With no holdings located in archives, The Boy Rider is considered a lost film.
