= The Fighting Buckaroo (1926 film) =

1926 film

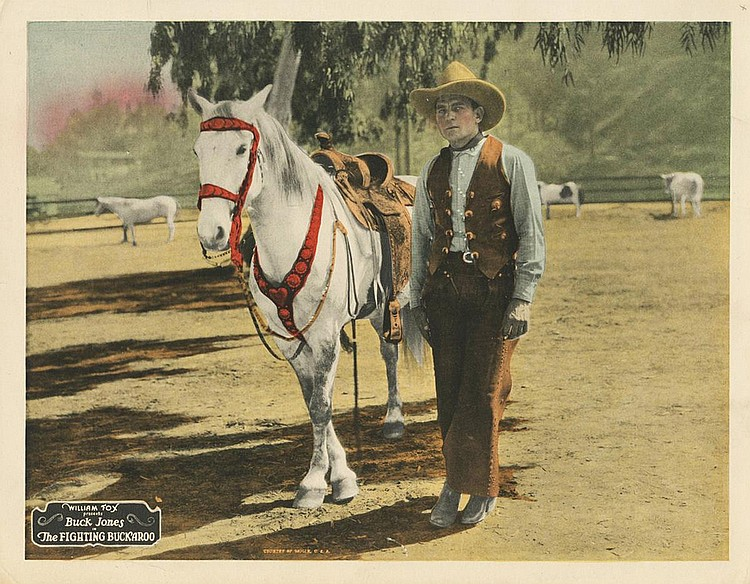
- Lobby card
- Directed by: Roy William Neill
- Written by: Frank Howard Clark; Charles Darnton
- Produced by: William Fox
- Starring: Buck Jones; Sally Long; Lloyd Whitlock
- Cinematography: Reginald Lyons
- Production company: Fox Film
- Distributed by: Fox Film
- Release date: April 4, 1926
- Running time: 50 minutes
- Country: United States
- Language: Silent (English intertitles)

The Fighting Buckaroo is a 1926 American silent Western film directed by Roy William Neill and starring Buck Jones, Sally Long, and Lloyd Whitlock.

== Plot ==
As described in a film magazine review, Larry Crawford, in an endeavor to stop a car which runs over a boy, halts Judge Richard Gregory through error and is arrested. During this mishap he falls in love with the judge’s daughter Betty. He is sent to take up an option on the judge’s land, on which gold has been found. Another wants the land and the young woman. His gang steals the young woman’s pearls and Larry saves her. After a wild ride, they arrive in time to take up the option on the land and win the judge’s consent to their marriage.

== Cast ==
- Buck Jones as Larry Crawford
- Sally Long as Betty Gregory
- Lloyd Whitlock as Glenmore Bradley
- Frank Butler as Percy M. Wellington
- E.J. Ratcliffe as Judge Richard Gregory
- Ben Hendricks Jr. as First Crook
- Ray Thompson as Second Crook
- Frank Rice as Any Parker

== Preservation ==
The Fighting Buckaroo is a lost film.

== Bibliography ==
- Solomon, Aubrey. The Fox Film Corporation, 1915-1935: A History and Filmography. McFarland, 2011.
