= Milburn Morante =

American actor (1887–1964)

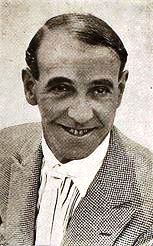
- Milburn Morante
- Born: April 6, 1887; San Francisco, California, United States
- Died: January 28, 1964 (aged 76); Pacoima, California, United States
- Occupations: Actor, Director
- Years active: 1920-1953 (film)

Milburn Morante (April 6, 1887 – January 28, 1964) was an American actor, film director and makeup artist.

== Partial filmography ==
- The Covered Trail (1924)
- Battling Mason (1924)
- The Terror of Pueblo (1924)
- A Fighting Heart (1924)
- The Right Man (1925)
- Wolf Blood (1925)
- The Desperate Game (1926)
- Bucking the Truth (1926)
- Blue Blazes (1926)
- The Escape (1926)
- Chasing Trouble (1926)
- The Grey Devil (1926)
- Daring Deeds (1927)
- The Little Buckaroo (1928)
- Wizard of the Saddle (1928)
- The Fightin' Redhead (1928)
- The Pinto Kid (1928)
- The Freckled Rascal (1929)
- The Little Savage (1929)
- The Vagabond Cub (1929)
- Sundown Saunders (1935)
- Skull and Crown (1935)
- Pals of the Range (1935)
- Cyclone of the Saddle (1935)
- Wild Mustang (1935)
- Blazing Justice (1936)
- Ghost-Town Gold (1936)
- Bar-Z Bad Men (1937)
- Mystery Range (1937)
- Sing, Cowboy, Sing (1937)
- Law of the Timber (1941)
- Trail of the Silver Spurs (1941)
- Buzzy and the Phantom Pinto (1941)
- Boot Hill Bandits (1942)
- Drifting Along (1946)
- Crossed Trails (1948)
- Hidden Danger (1948)
- Cowboy Cavalier (1948)
- The Fighting Ranger (1948)
- Haunted Trails (1949)
- Law of the Panhandle (1950)
- West of Wyoming (1950)
- Abilene Trail (1951)
- Blazing Bullets (1951)

== Bibliography ==
- George A. Katchmer. A Biographical Dictionary of Silent Film Western Actors and Actresses. McFarland, 2009.
