= Wizard of the Saddle =

1928 film

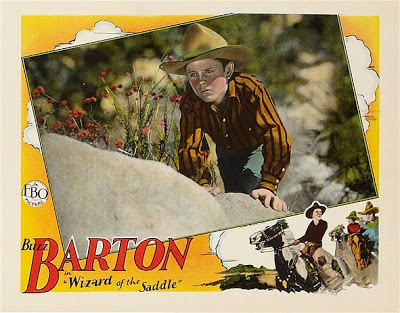
- Directed by: Frank Howard Clark
- Written by: Randolph Bartlett; Frank Howard Clark
- Starring: Buzz Barton; Milburn Morante; James Ford
- Cinematography: Roy Eslick
- Production company: Film Booking Offices of America
- Distributed by: Film Booking Offices of America
- Release date: January 22, 1928
- Running time: 50 minutes
- Country: United States
- Languages: Silent; English intertitles

Wizard of the Saddle is a 1928 American silent Western film directed by Frank Howard Clark and starring Buzz Barton, Milburn Morante and James Ford.

== Cast ==
- Buzz Barton as Red Hepner
- Milburn Morante as Hank Robbins
- James Ford as Tom Ellis
- Duane Thompson as Jenny Adams
- Jim Welch as 'Pop' Adams
- Bert Appling as Kirk McGrew

== Preservation ==
Today, the film is considered to be lost.

== Bibliography ==
- Munden, Kenneth White. The American Film Institute Catalog of Motion Pictures Produced in the United States, Part 1. University of California Press, 1997.
