= The Speed Demon =

1925 film

- Directed by: Robert N. Bradbury
- Written by: Samuel M. Pyke; Robert E. Hopkins
- Produced by: Bud Barsky
- Starring: Kenneth MacDonald; Peggy Montgomery; Clark Comstock
- Cinematography: Della M. King
- Edited by: Della M. King
- Production company: Bud Barsky Corporation
- Distributed by: Bud Barsky Corporation; Woolf and Freedman Film Service (UK)
- Release date: June 25, 1925
- Running time: 50 minutes
- Country: United States
- Languages: Silent; English intertitles

The Speed Demon is a 1925 American silent sports action film directed by Robert N. Bradbury and starring Kenneth MacDonald, Peggy Montgomery and Clark Comstock.

== Cast ==
- Kenneth MacDonald as Speed Sherman
- Peggy Montgomery as Enid Warren
- Wayne Lamont as Joe Blake
- Art Manning as Ed Norton
- Clark Comstock as Col. Warren
- Jack P. Pierce as Pickles Rankin
- Frank Rice as Col. Warren's butler
- Barney Oldfield as Barney Oldfield

== Bibliography ==
- Connelly, Robert B. The Silents: Silent Feature Films, 1910-36, Volume 40, Issue 2. December Press, 1998.
- Munden, Kenneth White. The American Film Institute Catalog of Motion Pictures Produced in the United States, Part 1. University of California Press, 1997.
