= Tracked =

1928 film

- Directed by: Jerome Storm
- Written by: Frank Howard Clark; Helen Gregg; John Twist
- Starring: Sam Nelson; Caryl Lincoln
- Cinematography: Robert De Grasse
- Edited by: Ted Cheesman
- Production company: Film Booking Offices of America
- Distributed by: Film Booking Offices of America
- Release date: November 4, 1928
- Running time: 55 minutes
- Country: United States
- Languages: Silent; English intertitles

Tracked is a 1928 American silent Western film directed by Jerome Storm and starring Sam Nelson and Caryl Lincoln. A sheepdog is wrongly accused of being a sheep-killer.

== Cast ==
- Ranger the Dog as Lobo
- Sam Nelson as Jed Springer
- Caryl Lincoln as Molly Butterfield
- Albert J. Smith as Lem Hardy
- Jack Henderson as The Rustler
- Art Robbins as The Herder
- Clark Comstock as Nathan Butterfield

== Bibliography ==
- Langman, Larry. A Guide to Silent Westerns. Greenwood Publishing Group, 1992.
