= Son of the Golden West =

1928 film

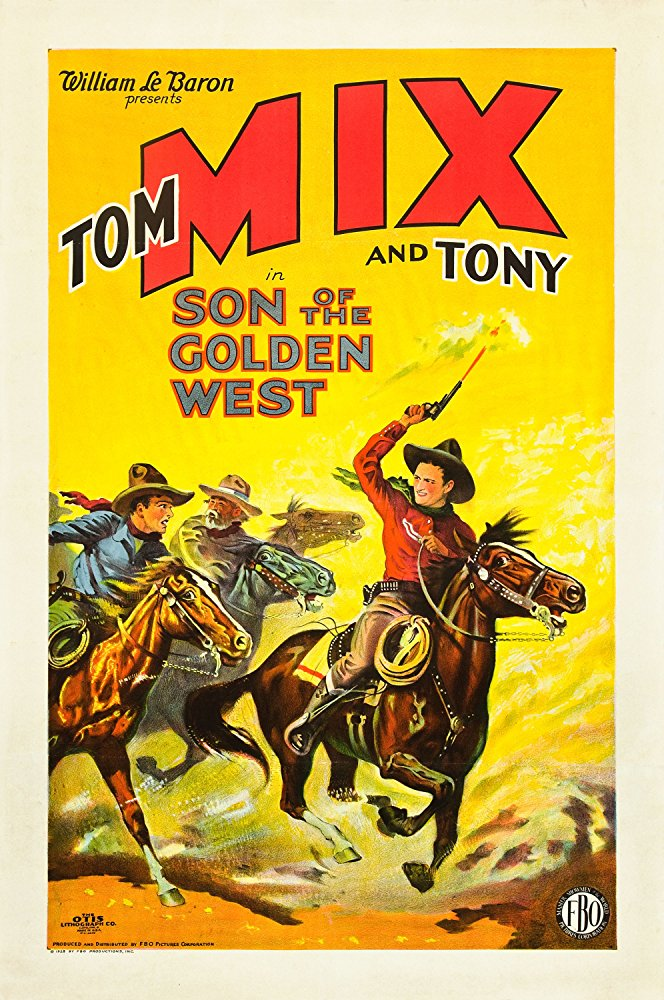
- Directed by: Eugene Forde
- Written by: George W. Pyper; Randolph Bartlett
- Starring: Tom Mix; Sharon Lynn; Thomas G. Lingham
- Cinematography: Norman Devol
- Edited by: Henry Weber
- Production company: Film Booking Offices of America (FBO)
- Distributed by: FBO
- Release date: October 1, 1928
- Running time: 60 minutes
- Country: United States
- Languages: Silent; English intertitles

Son of the Golden West is a 1928 American silent Western film directed by Eugene Forde and starring Tom Mix, Sharon Lynn and Thomas G. Lingham. A complete copy of Son of the Golden West exists.

== Cast ==
- Tom Mix as Tom Hardy
- Tony the Horse as Tony, Tom's Horse
- Sharon Lynn as Alice Calhoun
- Thomas G. Lingham as Jim Calhoun
- Duke R. Lee as Slade
- Lee Shumway as Tennessee
- Fritzi Ridgeway as Rita
- Joey Ray as Keller
- Mark Hamilton as Kane
- Wynn Mace as Slade's Henchman

== Bibliography ==
- Jensen, Richard D. The Amazing Tom Mix: The Most Famous Cowboy of the Movies. 2005.
