= The Fightin' Redhead =

1928 film

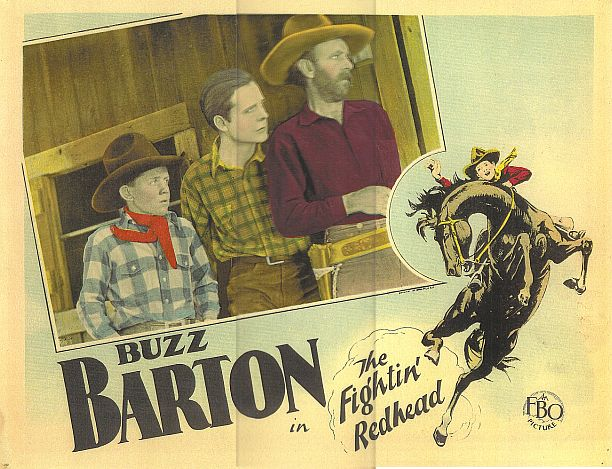
- Directed by: Louis King
- Written by: Frank Howard Clark; Frank T. Daugherty; E.A. Patterson
- Starring: Buzz Barton; Duane Thompson; Milburn Morante
- Cinematography: Roy Eslick
- Edited by: Della M. King
- Production company: Film Booking Offices of America
- Distributed by: Film Booking Offices of America
- Release date: July 1, 1928
- Running time: 50 minutes
- Country: United States
- Languages: Silent; English intertitles

The Fightin' Redhead is a 1928 American silent Western film directed by Louis King and starring Buzz Barton, Duane Thompson and Milburn Morante.

== Cast ==
- Buzz Barton as Red Hepner
- Duane Thompson as Jane Anderson
- Milburn Morante as Sidewinder Steve
- Bob Fleming as Bob Anderson
- Edmund Cobb as Tom Reynolds
- Edward Hearn as Jim Dalton

== Preservation ==
With no holdings located in archives, The Fightin' Redhead is considered a lost film.
