= Riders of Mystery =

1925 film

- Directed by: Robert N. Bradbury
- Written by: George W. Pyper
- Produced by: Jesse J. Goldburg
- Starring: Bill Cody; Frank Rice; Thomas G. Lingham
- Cinematography: Bert Longenecker
- Production company: Independent Pictures
- Distributed by: Independent Pictures
- Release date: May 29, 1925
- Running time: 50 minutes
- Country: United States
- Languages: Silent; English intertitles

Riders of Mystery is a 1925 American silent Western film directed by Robert N. Bradbury and starring Bill Cody, Frank Rice, and Thomas G. Lingham.

== Plot ==
As described in a film magazine review, the Sheriff is shot while trying to capture a band of robbers. Bob takes him to a shack for shelter. While bringing back his belt for identification by his daughter, Bob is framed by the villain John and taken to jail. He escapes and captures the bandits.

== Cast ==
- Bill Cody as Bob Merriwell
- Frank Rice as Jerry Jones
- Thomas G. Lingham as John Arliss
- Peggy O'Day as Helen Arliss
- Mack V. Wright as Dan Blair

== Bibliography ==
- Munden, Kenneth White. The American Film Institute Catalog of Motion Pictures Produced in the United States, Part 1. University of California Press, 1997.
