= Della M. King =

American film editor

- Born: 1890; Ireland
- Died: Unknown
- Occupation: Film editor
- Spouse: Thomas Hatch King

Della M. King was an Irish-born film editor active in Hollywood in the late 1910s and through the 1920s. She began working as a film cutter in the late 1910s, and her first known credit was on 1924's Behind Two Guns. She spent most of her career employed at Film Booking Offices of America. She also received a sole credit as cinematographer on 1925's The Speed Demon, and sole credit as a screenwriter on 1924's The Air Hawk. Her date of death is unknown.

== Selected filmography ==
As editor:

- Laughing at Death (1929)
- The Amazing Vagabond (1929)
- Come and Get It! (1929)
- Fury of the Wild (1929)
- Orphan of the Sage (1928)
- Headin' for Danger (1928)
- The Avenging Rider (1928)
- Dog Law (1928)
- Lightning Speed (1928)
- Terror Mountain (1928)
- The Bantam Cowboy (1928)
- Trail of Courage (1928)
- The Fightin' Redhead (1928)
- Man in the Rough (1928)
- The Pinto Kid (1928)
- Breed of the Sunsets (1928)
- The Little Buckaroo (1928)
- The Riding Renegade (1928)
- Driftin' Sands (1928)
- Better Days (1927)
- Sitting Bull at the Spirit Lake Massacre (1927)
- Dog of Dogs (1926)
- Dog Scents (1926)
- Fangs of Vengeance (1926)
- With Davy Crockett at the Fall of the Alamo (1926)
- The Wolf (1926)
- Daniel Boone Thru the Wilderness (1926)
- Who's Your Friend (1925)
- The Speed Demon (1925)
- The Air Hawk (1924)
- Dynamite Dan (1924)
- Behind Two Guns (1924)

As writer:

- The Air Hawk (1924)

As cinematographer:

- The Speed Demon (1925)
