= The Desert Pirate =

1927 film

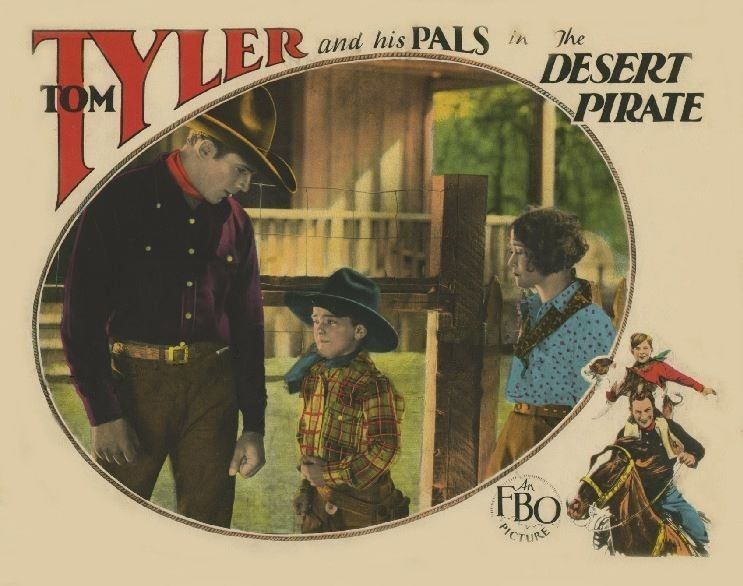
- Directed by: James Dugan
- Written by: Frank Howard Clark; Oliver Drake
- Produced by: Joseph P. Kennedy
- Starring: Tom Tyler; Frankie Darro; Duane Thompson
- Cinematography: Nicholas Musuraca
- Production company: Film Booking Offices of America
- Distributed by: Film Booking Offices of America; Ideal Films (UK)
- Release date: December 25, 1927
- Running time: 62 minutes
- Country: United States
- Languages: Silent; English intertitles

The Desert Pirate is a 1927 American silent Western film directed by James Dugan and starring Tom Tyler, Frankie Darro and Duane Thompson.

== Cast ==
- Tom Tyler as Tom Corrigan
- Frankie Darro as Jimmy Rand
- Duane Thompson as Ann Farnham
- Edward Hearn as Norton
- Thomas G. Lingham as Shorty Gibbs
- Vester Pegg as Henchman

== Preservation ==
With no holdings located in archives, The Desert Pirate is considered a lost film.

== Bibliography ==
- George A. Katchmer. Eighty Silent Film Stars: Biographies and Filmographies of the Obscure to the Well Known. McFarland, 1991.
