= Stolen Love (1928 film) =

1928 film

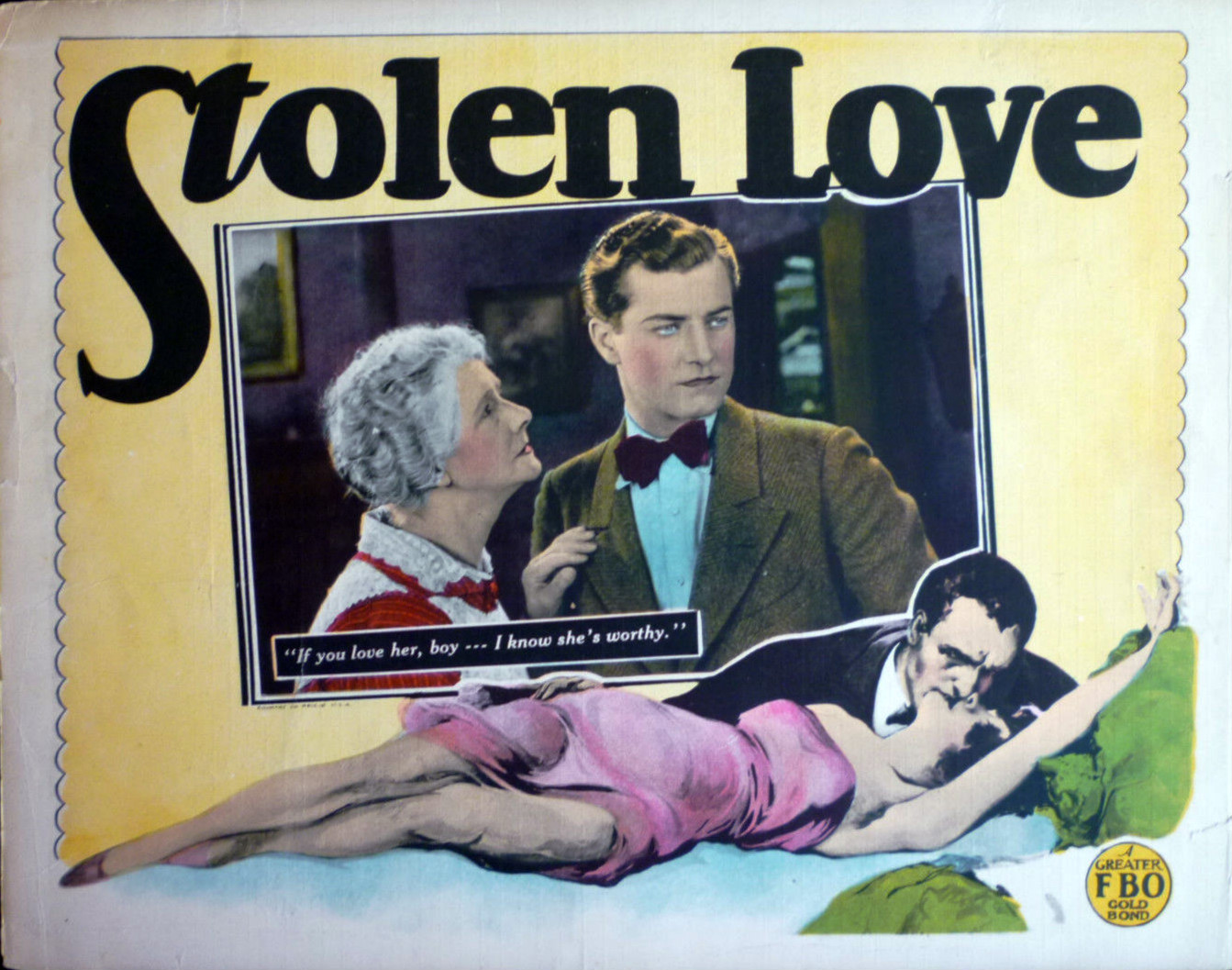
- Lobby card
- Directed by: Lynn Shores; Walter Daniels (asst.)
- Written by: Winifred Day; Helen Gregg
- Based on: Stolen Love by Hazel Livingston
- Produced by: FBO
- Starring: Marceline Day; Rex Lease
- Cinematography: Ted Pahle
- Edited by: Ann McKnight
- Distributed by: Film Booking Offices of America
- Release date: December 2, 1928
- Running time: 7 reels
- Country: United States
- Language: Silent (English intertitles)

Stolen Love is a 1928 American silent drama film directed by Lynn Shores and starring Marceline Day and Rex Lease. The plot was adapted from a serial story by Hazel Livingston published in Hearst Corporation newspapers.

== Plot ==
As noted in a film review, Joan Hastings, a 17-year old young woman, has never had a boy friend owing to the strict supervision by a pair of spinster aunts. She falls for Bill, a young garage mechanic with the invention bug. After her aunts quash the romance, she runs off to San Francisco to become a model under the sponsorship of the menacing Curtis Barlow. Barlow plays the game carefully, waiting until he has Joan alone with him at his mountain cabin to make his move to take her. Bill rushes in at the last moment and engages in a fist fight.

== Cast ==
- Marceline Day as Joan Hastings
- Rex Lease as Bill
- Owen Moore as Curtis Barlow
- Helen Lynch as Ruth
- Blanche Frederici as Aunt Evvie
- Joy Winthrop as Aunt Babe
- Betty Blythe as Modiste

== Critical reception ==
A review in Harrison's Reports summarized the film as "Only fair . . . an old story, told in a conventional way". It complimented Day's "very good performance" and described Lease as "likeable as the hero", but it described Moore's acting as "in colorless manner".

== Preservation ==
With no prints of Stolen Love located in any film archives, it is a lost film.
