= Behind Two Guns =

1924 film

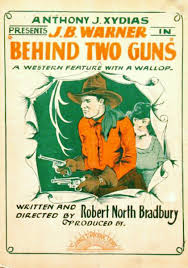
- Directed by: Robert North Bradbury
- Story by: Robert North Bradbury; Enoch O. Van Pelt
- Produced by: Anthony J. Xydias
- Starring: J. B. Warner; Hazel Newman; Marin Sais
- Cinematography: Bert Longenecker
- Edited by: Della M. King
- Production company: Sunset Productions
- Distributed by: Aywon Film Corporation
- Release date: May 15, 1924 (U.S.)
- Running time: 5 reels
- Country: United States
- Languages: Silent; English intertitles

Behind Two Guns is a 1924 American silent Western film, directed by Robert North Bradbury. It stars J. B. Warner, Hazel Newman, and Marin Sais, and was released on May 15, 1924.

== Plot ==
Dr. Elijah Cutter and his Indian assistant Eagle Slowfoot are called upon to investigate a series of stagecoach robberies. The stages arrive at their destination never having been held up, but when the locked cashbox is opened, all of the money is missing.

Dr. Betz is a hypnotist. He has been hypnotizing Myrtle Baxter and using her to commit the crimes. Jessie Nash asks Cutter to help prove that her grandfather, who is accused of the crime, is innocent.

Cutter watches from afar to determine how the money is being taken, and he and Eagle Slowfoot set out to capture the perpetrators. Betz is killed during the ensuing struggle.

== Cast ==
- J. B. Warner as Dr. Elijah Cutter
- Hazel Newman as Jessie Nash
- Marin Sais as Myrtle Baxter
- Jay Morley as Ward Baxter
- Jim Welch as Scout Nash
- Otto Lederer as Olaf Ludovic/Dr. Betz
- Guillermo Calles as Eagle Slowfoot
- Jack Waltemeyer as Sheriff Joe Haynes
- Emily Gerdes as Esmeralda Perkins
- Bartlett Carré as Jake Watkins
- Robert North Bradbury

== Production ==
Behind Two Guns is one of the few surviving films to prominently feature Guillermo Calles. He wears pasty makeup and long braids, and performs a stereotypical Indian dance wearing a feathered outfit.

== Preservation ==
With no holdings located in archives, Behind Two Guns is considered a lost film.
