= Buzz Barton =

American actor (1913–1980)

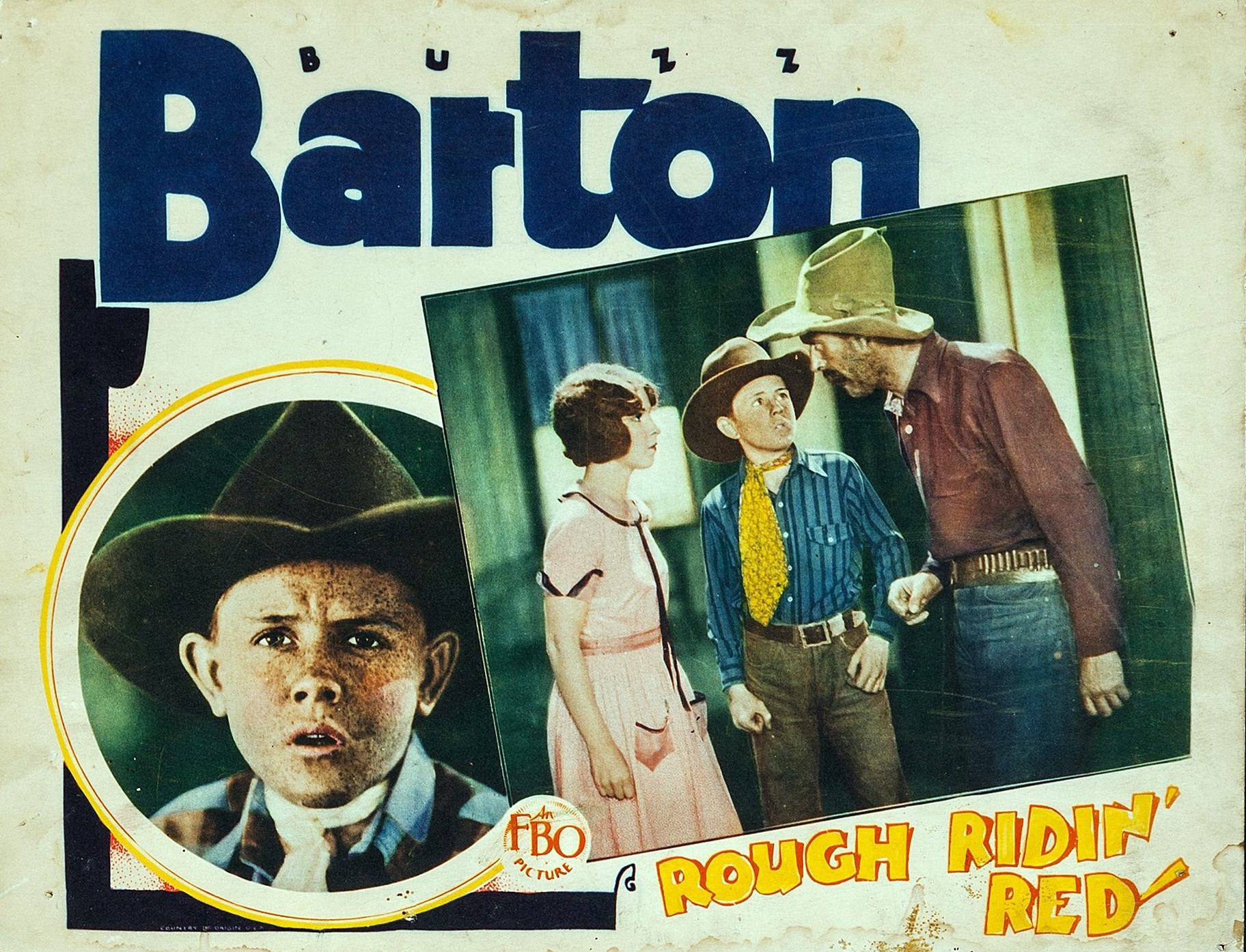
- Lobby card featuring Barton
- Born: September 3, 1913; Gallatin, Missouri, U.S.
- Died: November 20, 1980 (aged 67); Reseda, California, U.S.
- Occupation: Actor
- Years active: 1924-1942 (film)

Buzz Barton (1913–1980) was an American film actor. He is predominantly known for his roles as a child actor in a number of silent westerns made by the FBO studios during the 1920s. Following the introduction of sound, he mainly played supporting roles.

Working for M. G. M. and Universal, Barton made more than 50 feature films. He also made a serial, Wild Horse Barton.

In 1933, Barton headed the Buzz Barton Wild West traveling show.

== Selected filmography ==
- The Knockout Kid (1925)
- Splitting the Breeze (1927)
- The Boy Rider (1927)
- The Slingshot Kid (1927)
- Thunderbolt's Tracks (1927)
- The Fightin' Redhead (1928)
- The Pinto Kid (1928)
- The Bantam Cowboy (1928)
- Rough Ridin' Red (1928)
- Wizard of the Saddle (1928)
- The Little Buckaroo (1928)
- Young Whirlwind (1928)
- Orphan of the Sage (1928)
- The Vagabond Cub (1929)
- The Freckled Rascal (1929)
- Pals of the Prairie (1929)
- The Little Savage (1929)
- The Lone Defender (1930)
- Breed of the West (1930)
- The Cyclone Kid (1931)
- So This Is Arizona (1931)
- Wild West Whoopee (1931)
- Riders of the Cactus (1931)
- Flying Lariats (1931)
- Human Targets (1932)
- Tangled Fortunes (1932)
- The Tonto Kid (1935)
- Powdersmoke Range (1935)
- The Reckless Buckaroo (1935)
- Saddle Aces (1935)
- Fighting Pioneers (1935)
- Feud of the West (1936)
- The Riding Avenger (1936)
- Romance Rides the Range (1936)
- Rolling Caravans (1938)
- Phantom Gold (1938)
- The Painted Trail (1938)
- Frontiers of '49 (1939)
- Wild Horse Valley (1940)

== Bibliography ==
- Munden, Kenneth White. The American Film Institute Catalog of Motion Pictures Produced in the United States, Part 1. University of California Press, 1997.
