= Driftin' Sands =

1928 film

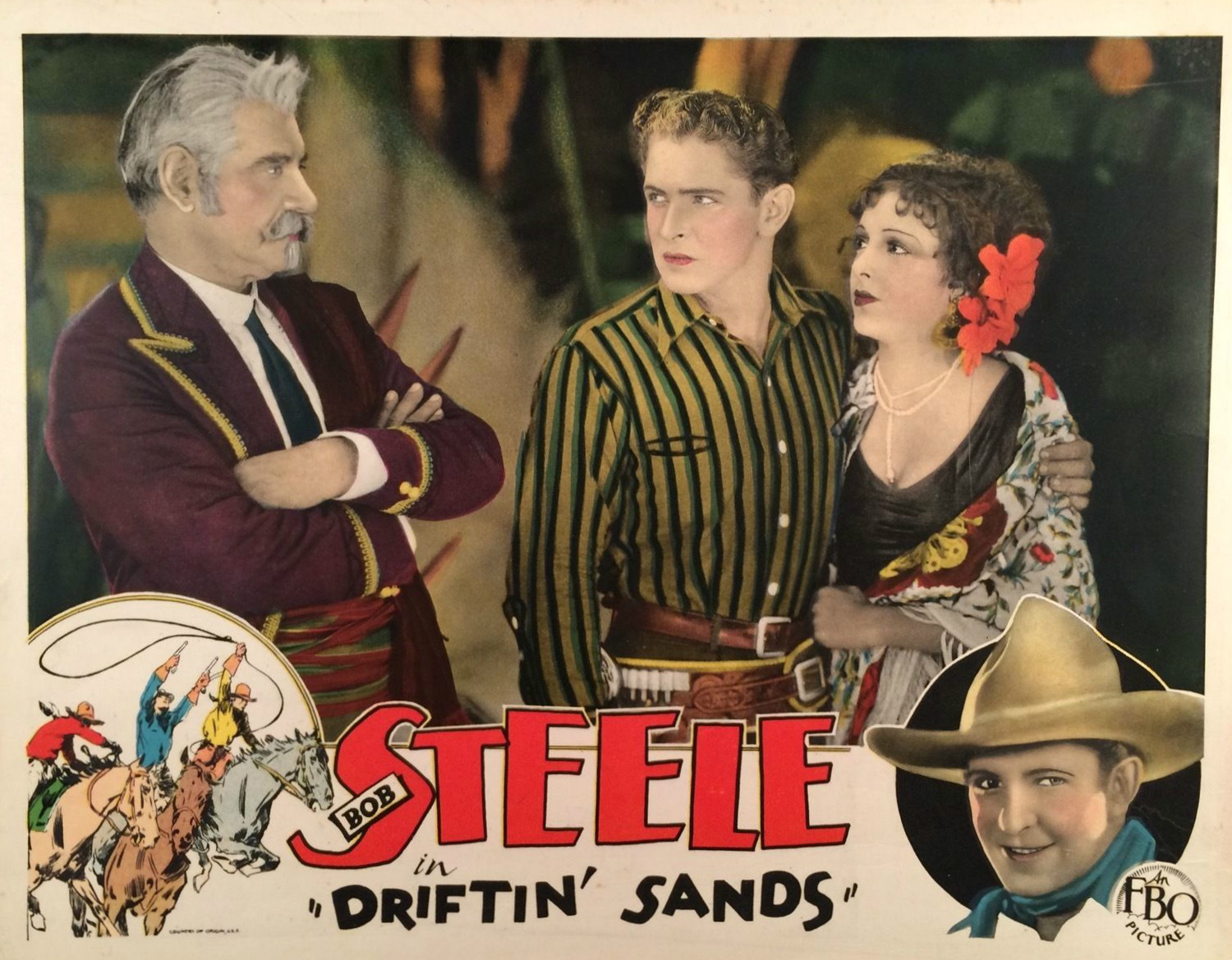
- Directed by: Wallace Fox
- Written by: Frank T. Daugherty; Oliver Drake; W.C. Tuttle
- Produced by: Robert N. Bradbury; Joseph P. Kennedy
- Starring: Bob Steele; Nina Quartero; William H. Turner
- Cinematography: Allen G. Siegler
- Edited by: Della M. King
- Production company: Film Booking Offices of America
- Distributed by: Film Booking Offices of America
- Release date: January 1, 1928
- Running time: 50 minutes
- Country: United States
- Languages: Silent; English intertitles

Driftin' Sands is a 1928 American silent Western film directed by Wallace Fox and starring Bob Steele, Nina Quartero, and William H. Turner.

== Cast ==
- Bob Steele as 'Driftin' Sands
- Nina Quartero as Nita Aliso
- William H. Turner as Don Roberto Aliso
- Gladden James as Benton
- Jay Morley
- Carl Axzelle

== Preservation ==
With no holdings located in archives, Driftin' Sands is considered a lost film.
