= The Avenging Rider (1928 film) =

1928 film

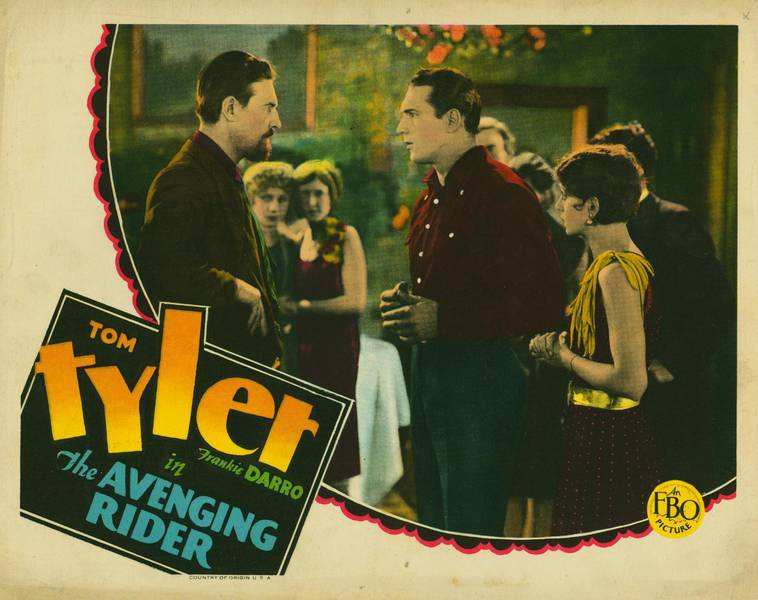
- Directed by: Wallace Fox
- Written by: Randolph Bartlett; Adele Buffington; Frank Howard Clark
- Starring: Tom Tyler; Florence Allen; Frankie Darro
- Cinematography: Nicholas Musuraca
- Edited by: Della M. King
- Production company: Film Booking Offices of America
- Distributed by: Film Booking Offices of America
- Release date: October 7, 1928
- Running time: 60 minutes
- Country: United States
- Languages: Silent; English intertitles

The Avenging Rider is a 1928 American silent Western film directed by Wallace Fox and starring Tom Tyler, Florence Allen and Frankie Darro.

== Plot ==
According to Billboard magazine, "the story concerns rivalry between two ranch owners in a boundary dispute, with the result that one is murdered by the other. The deceased leaves his ranch to his niece, played by Florence Allen, and the foreman Tom Tyler. The girl owner of one-half of the ranch brings out a load of her friends and tries to make a dancing academy out of the place, but meets opposition by Tyler. The villain in his attempt to play up to the attractive girl, tries to blame Tyler for the murder of the ranch owner. However, the hero unearths evidence that eventually lands the real murderer in the pen."

== Cast ==
- Tom Tyler as Tom Larkin
- Florence Allen as Sally Sheridan
- Frankie Darro as Frankie Sheridan
- Al Ferguson as Bob Gordon
- Bob Fleming as Sheriff
- Arthur Thalasso as Dance professor

== Reception ==
Billboard's review was positive towards the film, stating that "it is sure to please the action-craving kids and adults."

The Film Daily gave the film a positive review, despite saying "There is nothing about it to lift it out of the usual run of westerns built to get the vote of the younger fans."

Variety gave the film a poor review, with the reviewer calling the film "monotonous" and "generally nonsensical and abnormally hacked."

== Preservation ==
A fragment of the film is held by the Gosfilmofond.
