= The Freckled Rascal =

1929 film

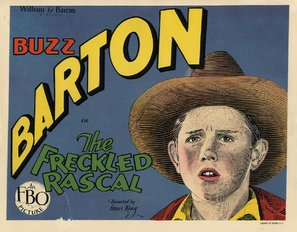
- Directed by: Louis King
- Written by: Frank Howard Clark
- Produced by: William LeBaron
- Starring: Buzz Barton; Milburn Morante; Lotus Thompson
- Cinematography: Nicholas Musuraca
- Edited by: George Marsh
- Production company: Film Booking Offices of America
- Distributed by: Film Booking Offices of America
- Release date: March 31, 1929
- Running time: 50 minutes
- Country: United States
- Languages: Silent; English intertitles

The Freckled Rascal is a lost 1929 American silent Western film directed by Louis King and starring Buzz Barton, Milburn Morante and Lotus Thompson.

== Cast ==
- Buzz Barton as Red Hepner
- Milburn Morante as Hank Robbins
- Thomas G. Lingham as Follansbee
- Lotus Thompson as Sally
- Pat J. O'Brien as Jim Kane
- Bill Patton as Bill Latham

== Preservation ==
With no holdings located in archives, The Freckled Rascal is considered a lost film.
