= The Bantam Cowboy =

1928 film

- Directed by: Louis King
- Written by: Robert N. Bradbury; Frank Howard Clark; Frank T. Daugherty
- Produced by: Robert N. Bradbury
- Starring: Buzz Barton; Frank Rice; Nancy Drexel
- Cinematography: Roy Eslick
- Edited by: Della M. King
- Production company: Film Booking Offices of America
- Distributed by: Film Booking Offices of America
- Release date: August 12, 1928
- Running time: 60 minutes
- Country: United States
- Languages: Silent; English intertitles

The Bantam Cowboy is a 1928 American silent Western film directed by Louis King and starring Buzz Barton, Frank Rice and Nancy Drexel.

== Cast ==
- Buzz Barton as David 'Red' Hepner
- Frank Rice as Sidewinder Steve
- Thomas G. Lingham as John Briggs
- Nancy Drexel as Nan Briggs
- Bob Fleming as Sheriff Jason Todd
- Bill Patton as Chuck Rogers
- Sam Nelson as Jim Thornton

== Preservation ==
With no holdings located in archives, The Bantam Cowboy is considered a lost film.
