= Reckless Courage =

1925 film

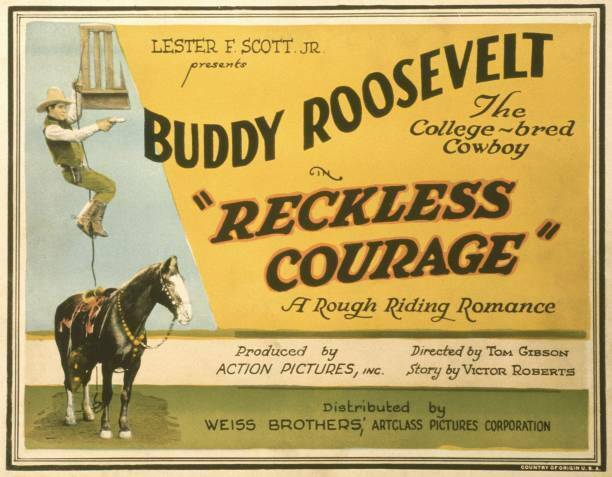
- Directed by: Tom Gibson
- Written by: Betty Burbridge; Victor Roberts
- Produced by: Lester F. Scott Jr.
- Starring: Buddy Roosevelt; Helen Foster; Jay Morley
- Cinematography: Ray Ries
- Production company: Action Pictures
- Distributed by: Weiss Brothers
- Release date: May 8, 1925
- Running time: 50 minutes
- Country: United States
- Languages: Silent; English intertitles

Reckless Courage is a 1925 American silent Western film directed by Tom Gibson and starring Buddy Roosevelt, Helen Foster and Jay Morley.

== Cast ==
- Buddy Roosevelt as Bud Keenan
- J.C. Fowler as Jasper Bayne
- Helen Foster as Doris Bayne
- William McIllwain as Butler
- Jay Morley as Jim Allen
- John M. O'Brien as Scar Degan
- N.E. Hendrix as Shorty Baker
- Merrill McCormick as Chuck Carson
- Eddie Barry as Slim Parker
- Neola May as Winona
- Bob Burns as The Law

== Bibliography ==
- Connelly, Robert B. The Silents: Silent Feature Films, 1910-36, Volume 40, Issue 2. December Press, 1998.
- Munden, Kenneth White. The American Film Institute Catalog of Motion Pictures Produced in the United States, Part 1. University of California Press, 1997.
