= The Pinto Kid (1928 film) =

1928 film

- Directed by: Louis King
- Written by: Frank T. Daugherty; Oliver Drake; Jean DuPont Miller; John Twist
- Produced by: Robert N. Bradbury
- Starring: Buzz Barton; Frank Rice; Jim Welch
- Cinematography: Roy Eslick
- Edited by: Della M. King
- Production company: Film Booking Offices of America
- Distributed by: Film Booking Offices of America
- Release date: April 29, 1928
- Running time: 50 minutes
- Country: United States
- Languages: Silent; English intertitles

The Pinto Kid is a 1928 American silent Western film directed by Louis King and starring Buzz Barton, Frank Rice and Jim Welch.

== Cast ==
- Buzz Barton as David 'Red' Hepner
- Frank Rice as Hank Robbins
- Jim Welch as Andy Bruce
- Gloria Lee as Janet Bruce
- Milburn Morante as Pat Logan
- Hugh Trevor as Dan Logan
- Bill Patton as Rufe Sykes
- Walter Shumway as Bert Lowery

== Production ==
The Pinto Kid was partially shot on location at Big Tujunga.

== Bibliography ==
- Pitts, Michael R. Western Movies: A Guide to 5,105 Feature Films. McFarland, 2012.
