= Wild Horse Valley (film) =

1940 film

- Directed by: Ira Webb
- Written by: Harry Gordon; Carl Krusada
- Produced by: Harry S. Webb
- Starring: Bob Steele; Phyllis Adair; Lafe McKee
- Cinematography: Edward A. Kull
- Edited by: S. Roy Luby
- Music by: Frank Sanucci
- Production company: Metropolitan Pictures
- Distributed by: Metropolitan Pictures
- Release date: March 13, 1940
- Running time: 55 minutes
- Country: United States
- Language: English

Wild Horse Valley is a 1940 American Western film directed by Ira Webb and starring Bob Steele, Phyllis Adair and Lafe McKee.

== Plot ==
After his stallion is stolen, Bob Evans and his sidekick pursue the horse thieves.

== Cast ==
- Bob Steele as Bob Evans
- Phyllis Adair as Ann Kimball
- Lafe McKee as Elmer Kimball
- Jimmy Aubrey as Shag Williams
- Ted Adams as Baker - Ranch Foreman
- Bud Osborne as Henchman Winton
- George Chesebro as Henchman Raymer
- Buzz Barton as Cowhand Joe
- Victor Adamson as Henchman

== Bibliography ==
- Pitts, Michael R. Western Movies: A Guide to 5,105 Feature Films. McFarland, 2012.
