= Jack Kitchin =

British film editor and producer

- Born: 1901; Burton Joyce, Nottinghamshire, England
- Died: 5 December 1983 (aged 81–82); Vancouver, British Columbia, Canada
- Occupations: Editor and producer
- Years active: 1928–1947

Jack Kitchin (1901–1983) was a British film editor and producer. Kitchin worked as editor on over thirty films, and as producer on a further five. He worked in Hollywood for much of his career before returning to Britain where he was employed by Ealing Studios. At Ealing he headed a special unit which made George Formby comedy films.

== Selected filmography ==
=== Editor ===
- Captain Careless (1928)
- Tropic Madness (1928)
- Dog Justice (1928)
- Law of Fear (1928)
- Orphan of the Sage (1928)
- Sporting Life (1929)
- A Swift Lover (1929)
- The Yellowback (1929)
- Double Lives (1929)
- The Vagabond Cub (1929)
- The Woman I Love (1929)
- The Pride of Pawnee (1929)
- The Three Brothers (1929)
- Framed (1930)
- Escape (1930)
- Birds of Prey (1930)
- The Lady Refuses (1931)
- Laugh and Get Rich (1931)
- Three Who Loved (1931)
- The Penguin Pool Murder (1932)
- Flying Down to Rio (1933)
- Little Women (1933)
- Melody Cruise (1933)
- Lorna Doone (1934)
- The Show Goes On (1937)

=== Producer ===
- Keep Fit (1937)
- It's in the Air (1938)
- Trouble Brewing (1939)
- Come on George! (1939)
- Mine Own Executioner (1947)

== Bibliography ==
- Richards, Jeffrey. The Age of the Dream Palace: Cinema and Society in 1930s Britain. I.B. Tauris, 2010.
