= Powdersmoke Range =

1935 film by Wallace Fox

- Theatrical release poster
- Directed by: Wallace Fox
- Screenplay by: Adele Buffington
- Based on: Powdersmoke Range; 1934 novel by William Colt MacDonald
- Produced by: Cliff Reid
- Starring: Harry Carey; Hoot Gibson; Guinn Williams; Bob Steele
- Cinematography: Harold Wenstrom
- Edited by: James B. Morley
- Music by: Alberto Colombo
- Production company: RKO Radio Pictures
- Distributed by: RKO Radio Pictures
- Release date: August 27, 1935 (United States)
- Running time: 72 minutes
- Country: United States
- Language: English

Powdersmoke Range is a 1935 black-and-white Western film directed by Wallace Fox starring Harry Carey, Hoot Gibson, Guinn Williams and Bob Steele. It is based on the 1934 novel of the same name by William Colt MacDonald with characters who would later appear in Republic's The Three Mesquiteers film series.

== Cast ==
- Harry Carey as Tucson Smith
- Hoot Gibson as Stony Brooke
- Bob Steele as Jeff Ferguson aka Guadalupe Kid
- Tom Tyler as Sundown Saunders
- Guinn "Big Boy" Williams as Lullaby Joslin
- Boots Mallory as Carolyn Sibley
- Ray Mayer as Chan Bell
- Sam Hardy as Big Steve Ogden
- Adrian Morris as Deputy Brose Glascow
- Buzz Barton as Buck
- Hal Taliaferro as Aloysius 'Bud' Taggart (as Wally Wales)
- Art Mix as Rube Phelps
- Jay Wilsey as Tex Malcolm (as Buffalo Bill Jr.)
- Buddy Roosevelt as Henchman Barnett

== See also ==
- Harry Carey filmography
- Hoot Gibson filmography
- Bob Steele filmography
