= Ethan Laidlaw =

American actor (1899–1963)

Ethan Allen Laidlaw
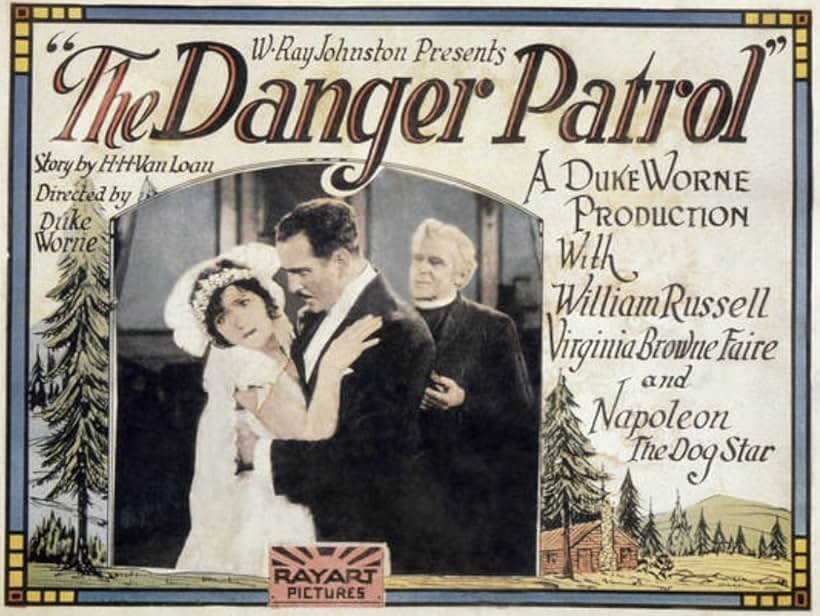
- Lobby card from Danger Patrol (1928) with Virginia Brown Faire and Laidlaw
- Born: November 25, 1899; Butte, Montana, U.S.
- Died: May 25, 1963 (aged 63); Los Angeles, California, U.S.
- Education: University of Michigan
- Occupation: Actor
- Years active: 1923-1962
- Spouse(s): Mildred A. Carter (1922-1947) (her death); Mabelle Anne Ward (1948-1963) (his death)

Ethan Allen Laidlaw (November 25, 1899 – May 25, 1963) was an American film actor. He appeared in more than 350 films and made more than 500 appearances on television, mainly uncredited in Westerns, from 1923 to 1962.

Laidlaw was born in Butte, Montana, and died in Los Angeles, California. He was the son of Charles Porter Laidlaw and Nellie Laidlaw (née Otis). Laidlaw was a graduate of the University of Michigan, and he worked as an engineer, then ventured into acting when he lived in Chicago. He was a U.S. Navy veteran.

Laidlaw was married to Mildred Carter, an actress. He died on May 25, 1963 in Los Angeles, California, at the age of 63.

== Filmography ==
- The Hunchback of Notre Dame (1923)
- Makers of Men (1925)
- The Temptress (1926)
- Danger Patrol (1928)
- The Little Savage (1929)
- The Virginian (1929)
- Bride of the Desert (1929)
- The Big House (1930)
- Cimarron (1931)
- Dishonored (1931)
- City Streets (1931)
- Monkey Business (1931)
- The Beast of the City (1932)
- Murders in the Zoo (1933)
- King Kong (1933)
- Broadway Thru a Keyhole (1933)
- Bachelor Bait (1934)
- The Mighty Barnum (1934)
- The Whole Town's Talking (1935)
- Les Misérables (1935)
- The Arizonian (1935)
- The Magnificent Brute (1936)
- Hearts in Bondage (1936)
- The Last of the Mohicans (1936)
- Come and Get It (1936)
- You Only Live Once (1937)
- This Is My Affair (1937)
- The Toast of New York (1937)
- The Cowboy and the Lady (1938)
- Jesse James (1939)
- Hotel Imperial (1939)
- Union Pacific (1939)
- Man of Conquest (1939)
- Frontier Marshal (1939)
- Dust Be My Destiny (1939)
- Virginia City (1940)
- Dark Command (1940)
- North West Mounted Police (1940)
- The Sea Wolf (1941)
- The Big Store (1941)
- Reap the Wild Wind (1942)
- The Great Man's Lady (1942)
- The Outlaw (1943)
- The Desperadoes (1943)
- Ali Baba and the Forty Thieves (1944)
- Mr. Skeffington (1944)
- Saratoga Trunk (1945)
- The Body Snatcher (1945)
- Road to Utopia (1946)
- The Stranger (1946)
- The Killers (1946)
- Magnificent Doll (1946)
- California (1947)
- The Perils of Pauline (1947)
- The Secret Life of Walter Mitty (1947)
- Down to Earth (1947)
- Lured (1947)
- The Wistful Widow of Wagon Gap (1947)
- Joan of Arc (1948) - Jean d'Aulon
- The Paleface (1948)
- Alias Nick Beal (1949)
- The Beautiful Blonde from Bashful Bend (1949)
- Roseanna McCoy (1949)
- Samson and Delilah (1949)
- Winchester '73 (1950)
- The Flame and the Arrow (1950)
- Union Station (1950)
- Frenchie (1950)
- Iron Man (1951)
- The Greatest Show on Earth (1952)
- The Miracle of Our Lady of Fatima (1952)
- Against All Flags (1952)
- Sangaree (1953)
- Calamity Jane (1953)
- Prince of Players (1955)
- The Scarlet Coat (1955)
- Ransom! (1956)
- The Court Jester (1956)
- The Maverick Queen (1956)
- The Ten Commandments (1956)
- Gunfight at the O.K. Corral (1957)
- The Buster Keaton Story (1957)
- The Buccaneer (1958)
- Alias Jesse James (1959)
- The Man Who Shot Liberty Valance (1962)
- To Kill a Mockingbird (1962)
- Son of Flubber (1963)
- Irma la Douce (1963)
- Wall of Noise (1963)
