= Thomas G. Lingham =

American actor (1870–1950)

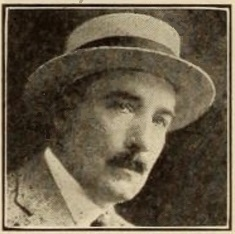
- Motion Picture News, 1916
- Born: Thomas Glessing Lingham; April 7, 1870; Indianapolis, Indiana, U.S.
- Died: February 19, 1950 (aged 79); Woodland Hills, Los Angeles, U.S.
- Occupations: Actor, operatic singer
- Years active: 1894–1934
- Spouse(s): Alberta Katherine Boardman (stage name Katherine Goodrich) (m. 1907-?)

Thomas G. Lingham (April 7, 1870 – February 19, 1950; also credited as Thomas Lingham, Tom Lingham, and as T. G. Lingham) was an American stage performer and then a film actor during both the silent and early sound eras. He appeared in more than 100 motion pictures between 1914 and 1934, often portraying villains, which in the film industry at that time were also called "heavies". During his 20-year screen career, Lingham was cast in productions for Kalem Company, Signal Film Corporation, Pathé, Universal Pictures, Mascot Pictures, Lone Star Film Company, and for other studios in and around Hollywood.

== Early life and stage career ==
Born in Indianapolis, Indiana, Thomas was the son of actress Katherine Fletcher and Matheis ("Matt") V. Lingham, who was also a well known stage actor and leading player on Broadway in the late 1870s and 1880s. Thomas Lingham began his own entertainment career performing in operatic productions in 1894 and then acting for five years with theatrical star James Neill, initially serving as a supporting character in the 1895 stage production Monte Cristo. Then, during the early 1900s, Lingham acted with several stock companies in Indianapolis, Buffalo, Louisville, and Boston as well as being featured in a variety of Broadway plays, including an "all-star cast" adaptation of The Three Musketeers.

== Film career ==
In 1913, after nearly 20 years singing and acting on stage, he and his wife Alberta (née Boardman), who used the name Katherine Goodrich in her own acting career, moved to California to begin working in the rapidly expanding motion picture industry in and around Los Angeles. Lingham soon found work with Kalem Company in east Hollywood, where in 1914 he was cast and credited as T. G. Lingham in dramas such as the two-reeler The Shadow of Guilt and the much longer five-reeler Shannon of the Sixth in which he portrayed Shah, the king of Dehli.

By 1916, Lingham had established a reputation at Kalem, Signal Film Corporation, and at other California studios as a reliable supporting player and as one particularly skilled in portraying villains on screen. In fact, in the 1916 "Motion Picture Studio Directory" published in the trade publication Motion Picture News, a section of several pages is devoted to profiling actors who specialize in roles as villains or "heavies". Lingham is listed and pictured among those actors. His directory entry even includes a basic description of him: "Hght., 6ft.; wght. 185; complexion brunette, green eyes, dark brown hair, is ice skater." His birth year in the entry is noted 1874, which represents him to be four years younger than his actual age.

In May 1916, Lingham and his wife Katherine Goodrich joined Signal cast and crew on location, traveling to Honolulu and Hilo, Hawaii to film the five-reeler crime drama The Diamond Runners. In the film, Lingham portrays Sir Thomas Holstead; Goodrich, the character Lady Holstead. That same year, in its July 8 issue, the "photoplay" critic for Motion Picture News gives a complimentary review to the Western Medicine Bend, Signal's sequel to its popular release Whispering Smith. In his review, William Esty alludes to Lingham, identifying him as part of the film's "competent" supporting cast. Then, in its August 12 issue, MPN reports that Lingham was injured during the filming of the "railroad picture" The Manager of the B. and A.:

...The set was burned to the ground amid exciting scenes. In a fight scene between [Paul] Hurst and Lingham, the latter was thrown to the floor of the printing office so violently that he received a bad scalp wound. He was supposed to be unconscious when the scene ended, and it was not until the camera had stopped running that players discovered he actually was unconscious.

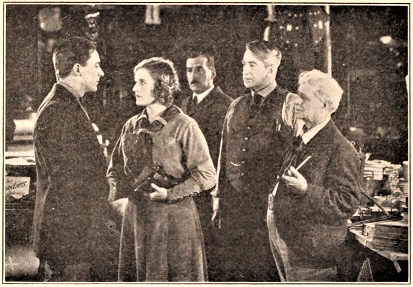
Lingham (center) in scene from the Universal serial The Red Glove (1919)

In the 15-episode Pathé serial Ruth of the Rockies in 1920, Lingham remained among the industry's favorite villains for casting directors and audiences. The widely read trade paper Wid's Daily in its review of the serial once again recognizes him as that production's "chief heavy". In an earlier issue of Wid's Daily, in 1919, the paper's advice columnist "Polly Perkins" shares with her readers Lingham's ideas about what makes the portrayal of a "heavy" successful on screen, along with his suggestions on how to be a dapper dresser on a tight budget:

Advice even from a villain can be a good thing. Thomas G. Lingham says that to be a successful villain one must be a nifty dresser. "For how," he asks, "is the city slicker going to beguile the country lassie unless he dazzles her?" Speaking from long experience in this—in the movies, he gives a few hints to young men on how to preserve their wardrobe. "Buy two suits and two pairs of shoes at the same time and wear them alternately. Cut a little of the small end of your necktie at intervals." Who couldn't be a Beau Brummel!

Throughout the rest of the 1920s and into the early years of the sound era, Lingham continued to perform regularly in pictures for various studios, often again as a "true-to-type villain" in Westerns, which remained very popular with American moviegoers. Some of the features in which he was cast and credited in the late 1920s and early 1930s include The Bandit's Son (1927), Son of the Golden West (1928), The Trail of Courage (1928), The Cowboy and the Outlaw (1929), The Invaders (1929), Two Sisters (1929), The Oklahoma Sheriff (1930), and Hunted Men (1930). In the final years of Lingham's career, up to 1935, he was cast in several uncredited parts. His final credited role, at least the one consistently cited in Lingham's available filmographies, is in the 1934 Western or "oater" The Star Packer starring John Wayne. In that release presented by Lone Star Productions, "Tom Lingham" plays Sheriff Al Davis, whose time on the screen is short-lived, for the character is shot and killed in the first 10 minutes of the 54-minute film.

By 1940, Lingham identified himself as fully retired from the motion picture industry. The United States Census for that year documents that he and his wife Alberta, who was long retired from her acting career, were still living in California, residing together in a $30-a-month apartment on Fountain Avenue in Los Angeles. In that federal survey of the nation's population, Lingham classifies himself as retired and also documents that he was not seeking employment in 1940 and had not worked for wages at all in the preceding year. The couple's living arrangements at that time suggest the two former actors were living modestly off investments or remaining income they had accrued during their many years performing on stage and in films. Sometime during the next decade, though, either for financial or medical reasons, Lingham relocated to the Motion Picture Country House, a retirement community for former film-industry employees in nearby Woodland Hills.

== Personal life and death ==
In Columbus, Ohio on February 4, 1907, Lingham married Alberta Katherine Boardman Brisk (stage name Katherine Goodrich). Thomas's obituary, however, in the Los Angeles Times in 1950 indicates that he may have been married a second time late in life. At the time of his death his surviving wife was identified in the newspaper simply as "Mary". Published three days after his death, Lingham's full obituary reads as follows:

Funeral services for Thomas G. Lingham, 79, former stage and screen actor will be conducted at Pierce Bros. Hollywood Chapel, followed by in[ter]ment in the Chapel of the Pines. Born in Indiana, he came to Southern California 37 years ago and lived at 23430 Ventura Blvd., Woodland Hills. He died Sunday in the Motion Picture Country Home and leaves his widow Mary.

== Partial filmography ==
- The Shadow of Guilt (1914)
- The Bond Eternal (1914)
- The Barrier of Ignorance (1914)
- The Potter and the Clay (1914)
- The Strangler's Cord (1915)
- The Dream Seekers (1915)
- The Pitfall (1915)
- Stingaree (1915)
- The Taking of Stingaree (1915)
- A Bushranger at Bay (1915)
- The Master Swindlers (1916)
- Medicine Bend (1916)
- The Manager of the B. and A. (1916)
- The Social Pirates (1916)
- Judith of the Cumberlands (1916)
- Lass of the Lumberlands (1916)
- The Lost Express (1917)
- The Railroad Raiders (1917)
- The Lion's Claws (1918)
- The Red Glove (1919)
- The Adventures of Ruth (1919)
- The Vanishing Dagger (1920)
- Ruth of the Rockies (1920)
- The Fire Eater (1921)
- The Honor of Rameriz (1921)
- My Lady Friends (1921)
- The Spirit of the Lake (1921)
- Riders of the Law (1922)
- The Crow's Nest (1922)
- Wolf Tracks (1923)
- The Forbidden Trail (1923)
- Itching Palms (1923)
- Desert Rider (1923)
- Desert Driven (1923)
- The Lightning Rider (1924)
- Wanted by the Law (1924)
- Riders of Mystery (1925)
- Heartless Husbands (1925)
- Where Was I? (1925)
- Sky High Corral (1926)
- The Border Sheriff (1926)
- Daniel Boone Thru the Wilderness (1926)
- The Set-Up (1926)
- Splitting the Breeze (1927)
- Tom's Gang (1927)
- Daring Deeds (1927)
- The Desert Pirate (1927)
- The Bandit's Son (1927)
- The Trail of Courage (1928)
- The Rawhide Kid (1928)
- Son of the Golden West (1928)
- The Bantam Cowboy (1928)
- Man in the Rough (1928)
- Young Whirlwind (1928)
- Fangs of the Wild (1928)
- Into the Night (1928)
- Orphan of the Sage (1928)
- The Cowboy and the Outlaw (1929)
- The Invaders (1929)
- The Fatal Warning (1929)
- The Freckled Rascal (1929)
- Two Sisters (1929)
- Pals of the Prairie (1929)
- The Oklahoma Sheriff (1930)
- Firebrand Jordan (1930)
- Hunted Men (1930)
- The Star Packer (1934)
