= Louis King =

American actor and movie director (1898–1962)

- Born: June 28, 1898; Christiansburg, Virginia, U.S.
- Died: September 7, 1962 (aged 64); Los Angeles, California, U.S.
- Resting place: Westwood Memorial Park
- Occupations: Film director, actor
- Relatives: Henry King (brother)

Louis King (June 28, 1898 – September 7, 1962) was an American actor and film director of westerns and adventure movies in the 1920s, 1930s, and 1940s.

== Early years ==
King was born in 1898 in Christiansburg, Virginia. His name was also written as L.H. King and Lewis King. A brother of director Henry King, he grew up on a tobacco farm. Their parents died in 1918, after which he moved to California, where his brother was already working in films.

== Career ==
King first worked for his brother, who was acting and directing for the Balboa Film Company. Then he became a "general handy man" for American Film Company.

He entered the film business in 1919 as a character actor. He specialized in villains and blusterers. He began his career as a director of a series of Westerns in the 1920s as Lewis King: The Bantam Cowboy (1928), The Fightin' Redhead (1928), The Pinto Kid (1928), The Little Buckaroo (1928), The Slingshot Kid (1927), The Boy Rider (1927), Montana Bill (1921), Pirates of the West (1921) and The Gun Runners (1921).

He directed Hollywood action adventures and Westerns in the 1930s and 1940s and 20th Century-Fox wartime film Chetniks! The Fighting Guerrillas in 1943. In the 1950s, he directed Westerns on television, including episodes of Gunsmoke in 1957, the Zane Grey Theater in 1958, The Adventures of Wild Bill Hickok and The Deputy in 1960–61.

== Death ==
King died of undisclosed causes on September 7, 1962, in Hollywood, California, at the age of 64. King is interred at Westwood Village Memorial Park and Mortuary in Los Angeles.

== Partial filmography ==
- Rosemary Climbs the Heights (1918)
- The Valley of Tomorrow (1920)
- The Gun Runners (1921)
- Ever Since Eve (1921)
- Singing River (1921)
- Peaceful Peters (1922)
- Watch Your Step (1922)
- Main Street (1923)
- Let's Go (1923)
- The Law Rustlers (1923)
- Spawn of the Desert (1923)
- The Printer's Devil (1923)
- The Devil's Cargo (1925)
- The Boy Rider (1927)
- The Pinto Kid (1928)
- The Little Buckaroo (1928)
- Orphan of the Sage (1928)
- The Bantam Cowboy (1928)
- Young Whirlwind (1928)
- The Fightin' Redhead (1928)
- Rough Ridin' Red (1928)
- The Freckled Rascal (1929)
- The Little Savage (1929)
- The Vagabond Cub (1929)
- Mexicali Rose (1929)
- Men Without Law (1930)
- The Lone Rider (1930)
- The Mask Falls (1931)
- Desert Vengeance (1931)
- Police Court (1932)
- The Arm of the Law (1932)
- Drifting Souls (1932)
- The County Fair (1932)
- Life in the Raw (1933)
- Bachelor of Arts (1934)
- Murder in Trinidad (1934)
- Charlie Chan in Egypt (1935)
- Angelina o el honor de un brigadier (1935) in Spanish
- Bengal Tiger (1936)
- Bulldog Drummond Comes Back (1937)
- Bulldog Drummond's Revenge (1937)
- Draegerman Courage (1937)
- Wine, Women and Horses (1937)
- Tom Sawyer, Detective (1938)
- The Way of All Flesh (1940)
- Typhoon (1940)
- Young America (1942)
- Chetniks! The Fighting Guerrillas (1943)
- Thunderhead, Son of Flicka (1945)
- Smoky (1946)
- Thunder in the Valley (1947)
- Green Grass of Wyoming (1948)
- Sand (1949)
- Mrs. Mike (1949)
- Powder River (1953)
- Sabre Jet (1953)
- Dangerous Mission (1954)
- Massacre (1956)
