= Frank Howard Clark =

American screenwriter

- Born: 1888; Pittsburgh, Pennsylvania, USA
- Died: January 19, 1962 (aged 73-74); Los Angeles, California, USA
- Years active: 1913-1946

Frank Howard Clark (1888 – January 19, 1962) was an American screenwriter. He wrote for 100 films between 1913 and 1946. He was born in Pittsburgh, Pennsylvania and died in Los Angeles, California.

== Selected filmography ==
- Bull's Eye (1917)
- The Fighting Grin (1918)
- The Magic Eye (1918)
- Nobody's Wife (1918)
- The Midnight Man (1919)
- Yvonne from Paris (1919)
- Flame of Youth (1920)
- Prairie Trails (1920)
- The Mother Heart (1921)
- Hands Off! (1921)
- Dusk to Dawn (1922)
- Billy Jim (1922)
- Conquering the Woman (1922)
- Her Dangerous Path (1923)
- Desert Rider (1923)
- American Manners (1924)
- Stepping Lively (1924)
- Laughing at Danger (1924)
- Wolves of the North (1924)
- $50,000 Reward (1924)
- Blue Blood (1925)
- Jimmie's Millions (1925)
- Youth and Adventure (1925)
- Under Fire (1926)
- The Flying Mail (1926)
- The Night Patrol (1926)
- The Fighting Buckaroo (1926)
- The Prairie King (1927)
- Tom's Gang (1927)
- The Boy Rider (1927)
- The Desert Pirate (1927)
- Splitting the Breeze (1927)
- The Texas Tornado (1928)
- The Little Buckaroo (1928)
- The Bantam Cowboy (1928)
- Trail of Courage (1928)
- Dog Law (1928)
- Phantom of the Range (1928)
- Rough Ridin' Red (1928)
- Wizard of the Saddle (1928)
- Tracked (1928)
- The Fightin' Redhead (1928)
- The Avenging Rider (1928)
- Idaho Red (1929)
- Fury of the Wild (1929)
- The Freckled Rascal (1929)
- The Pride of Pawnee (1929)
- The Utah Kid (1930)
- The Lone Rider (1930)
- The Fighting Marshal (1931)
- The Fighting Fool (1932)
