= Rider of Mystery Ranch =

1924 film directed by Denver Dixon

- Directed by: Denver Dixon
- Produced by: Denver Dixon
- Starring: Art Mix
- Production company: Bennett Productions
- Distributed by: Aywon Film Corporation
- Release date: May 3, 1924 (US)
- Running time: 5 reels
- Country: United States
- Language: English

Rider of Mystery Ranch is a 1924 American silent film directed by Denver Dixon, and starring Art Mix. It premiered on May 3, 1924, in Chillicothe, Missouri.

== Production ==
In early April 1924 it was announced that Los Angeles distributor R.D. Lewis had acquired the distribution rights to the film after relocating from Oklahoma City. This acquisition was part of a six-picture deal for Art Mix films, which included Ace of Cactus Range and South of Santa Fe.
