= Ace of Cactus Range =

1924 film by Denver Dixon and Malon Andrus

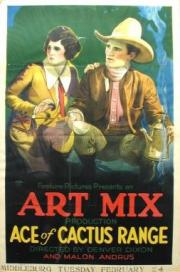
- Poster for the film
- Directed by: Denver Dixon; Malon Andrus
- Written by: Al Martin (titles); Nellie Whitefield (adaption)
- Story by: Irving Goldstein
- Starring: Pauline Starke; Virginia Warwick; Clifford Davidson
- Cinematography: Jack Fuqua
- Production company: Feature Pictures
- Distributed by: Aywon Film Corporation
- Release date: April 1924 (US)
- Running time: 5 reels
- Country: United States
- Language: Silent (English intertitles)

Ace of Cactus Range is a 1924 American silent Western film directed by Denver Dixon and Malon Andrus and starring Art Mix, Virginia Warwick, and Clifford Davidson. It was released in April 1924.

== Plot ==
U.S. Marshal Bob Cullen has infiltrated a gang of diamond thieves. When a local rancher discovers their operation, the gang's leader, Bull Davidson, begins to harass the rancher's daughter, Virginia Marsden. Attempting to escape the unwanted attention from Davidson, Marsden runs off to a remote cabin, but the gang follows. Cullen creates a diversion by overturning a lantern, then flees the cabin on horseback with Marsden. The gang pursues, and when Cullen's horse is injured in a fall, Cullen and Marsden are forced to spend the night on the open plain. The following morning the gang catches up. They capture Cullen and Marsden, tying Cullen up and leaving him suspended from a tree. Eventually Cullen escapes and makes it back to the gang's camp, where he able to rescue the girl.

== Cast list ==
- Art Mix as U. S. Marshal Bob Cullen
- Virginia Warwick as Virginia Marsden
- Clifford Davidson as Bull Davidson
- Harvey Stafford as Randolph Truthers
- Dorothy Chase as Cleora
- Charles Colby as Sheriff Buck Summers
- H. Paul Walsh as Markes
- A. W. Dearie as Sam
- Charles Mears as Quosmo

== Production ==
In early April 1924 it was announced that Los Angeles distributor R.D. Lewis had acquired the distribution rights to the film, after he moved there from Oklahoma City. It was part of a six-picture deal of Art Mix films, which included Rider of Mystery Ranch and South of Santa Fe.

== Preservation ==
A 16 mm print of the film is held by George Eastman Museum.
