= The Man from the Rio Grande =

The Man from the Rio Grande may refer to:

- The Man from the Rio Grande (1924 film), a film directed by Denver Dixon
- The Man from the Rio Grande (1943 film), a film directed by Howard Bretherton
