= South of Santa Fe =

South of Santa Fe may refer to:

- South of Santa Fe (1924 film), a silent film directed by Denver Dixon
- South of Santa Fe (1932 film), a film directed by Bert Glennon
- South of Santa Fe (1942 film), a film directed by Joseph Kane
- "South of Santa Fe", a song by Brooks & Dunn, from the album If You See Her
