= The Terror of Pueblo =

1924 film directed by Denver Dixon

- Directed by: Denver Dixon
- Written by: William Havens
- Produced by: Denver Dixon
- Starring: Art Mix; Alma Rayford
- Cinematography: Jack W. Fuqua
- Production company: Art Mix Productions
- Distributed by: State rights
- Release date: December 26, 1924 (US)
- Running time: 5 reels
- Country: United States
- Language: Silent (English intertitles)

The Terror of Pueblo is a lost 1924 American silent Western film directed by Denver Dixon, and starring Art Mix and Alma Rayford. It premiered on December 26, 1924, in Emporia, Kansas.

== Plot ==
As described in a film magazine review, Bill Hanley and Sam Hawkes still settle their disputes with guns. The arrival of Jack Hanley forces the issue, but Jack is averse to bloodshed. He becomes the laughing stock of the ranch, but turns on them finally and after rescuing his father, routs the enemy and wins the girl.

== Cast ==
- Art Mix as Jack Hanley (credited as George Kesterson)
- Alma Rayford as Anita
- Lafe McKee
- Jim Welch
- William Berke (credited as William Lester)
- Milburn Morante
- Mary Bruce

== Preservation ==
With no holdings located in archives, The Terror of Pueblo is considered a lost film.
