= Romance of the Wasteland =

1924 film starring Art Mix

- Starring: Art Mix; Alma Rayford
- Production company: Art Mix Productions
- Distributed by: Aywon Film Corporation
- Release date: October 10, 1924 (US)
- Running time: 5 reels
- Country: United States
- Language: English

Romance of the Wasteland, originally known as Hidden Law, is a 1924 American silent film starring Art Mix and Alma Rayford. It premiered on October 10, 1924.

== Cast list ==
- Art Mix as Ned Davis
- Alma Rayford as Virginia Fairfield
