= Salt Lake Trail =

1926 film directed by Denver Dixon

- Directed by: Denver Dixon
- Produced by: Denver Dixon
- Starring: Art Mix; Dorothy Lee
- Production company: Denver Dixon Productions
- Release date: June 5, 1926 (US)
- Running time: 5 reels
- Country: United States
- Language: English

Salt Lake Trail is a 1926 American silent film directed by Denver Dixon, and starring Art Mix and Dorothy Lee. It premiered on June 5, 1926, in Rushville, Indiana.
