= The Fighting Cowboy =

1933 film

- Directed by: Victor Adamson
- Written by: L. V. Jefferson
- Produced by: Victor Adamson
- Starring: Jay Wilsey; Genee Boutell; Allen Holbrook
- Cinematography: Brydon Baker
- Edited by: Frances Burroughs
- Production company: California Motion Picture Enterprises
- Distributed by: Superior Talking Pictures
- Release date: May 1, 1933
- Running time: 58 minutes
- Country: United States
- Language: English

The Fighting Cowboy is a 1933 American Western film directed by Victor Adamson and starring Jay Wilsey, Genee Boutell and Allen Holbrook.

== Cast ==
- Jay Wilsey as Bill Carson
- Genee Boutell as Lizabeth Horton
- Allen Holbrook as Duke Neill
- William Ryno as Cash Horton
- Marin Sais as Squaw Mary
- Tom Palky as Bugs
- Bartlett A. Carre as Pete Quimby
- Jack Evans as Buck
- William Barrymore as Red
- Ken Broeker as Sheriff
- Betty Butler as Duke's Girl
- Hamilton Steele as Storekeeper
- Clyde McClary as Irishman
- Ernest Scott as Desert Rat
- Bud Baxter as Deputy Sheriff

== Bibliography ==
- Michael R. Pitts. Poverty Row Studios, 1929–1940: An Illustrated History of 55 Independent Film Companies, with a Filmography for Each. McFarland & Company, 2005.
