= Shadow Ranger =

1926 film directed by Denver Dixon

- Directed by: Denver Dixon
- Produced by: Denver Dixon
- Starring: Art Mix
- Production company: Denver Dixon Productions
- Distributed by: Aywon Film Corporation
- Release date: June 14, 1926 (US)
- Running time: 5 reels
- Country: United States
- Language: English

Shadow Ranger is a 1926 American silent film directed by Denver Dixon, starring Art Mix. It premiered on June 14, 1926, in Poughkeepsie, New York.
