= Sagebrush Politics =

1930 film

- Directed by: Victor Adamson
- Written by: L.V. Jefferson
- Produced by: Dwain Esper; Victor Adamson
- Starring: Art Mix; Wally Merrill; Lilian Bond
- Cinematography: Brydon Baker
- Production company: Art Mix Productions
- Distributed by: Hollywood Pictures
- Release date: May 15, 1930 (US)
- Running time: 44 minutes
- Country: United States
- Languages: English (sound); English intertitles (silent)

Sagebrush Politics is a 1930 American silent Western film with sound sequences, directed by Denver Dixon, starring Art Mix, Wally Merrill, and Lilian Bond.

== Cast ==
- Art Mix as Tom Williams
- Lilian Bond as Sheriff's Daughter
- Gilbert Holmes as Joe Morgan
- William Ryno as Wolf
- Wally Merrill as Henchman
- Stuart Morgan Dancers
- Jim Campbell as Jim
- Tom Forman
