= Desert Mesa =

1935 film by Victor Adamson

- Directed by: Victor Adamson (as Art James)
- Screenplay by: Victor Adamson (as Van Johnson)
- Starring: Franklyn Farnum; Art Mix
- Cinematography: A.J. Fitzpatrick
- Edited by: Frances Burroughs
- Release date: 2 February 1935 (U.S.)

Desert Mesa is a seriously low-budget American B-movie Western directed by Victor Adamson for his independent production company. Some sources state that the film was re-released as Mormon Conquest in 1941, while others believe Mormon Conquest is a separate film from the same filmmakers.
