= With Buffalo Bill on the U. P. Trail =

1926 film

With Buffalo Bill on the U.P. Trail
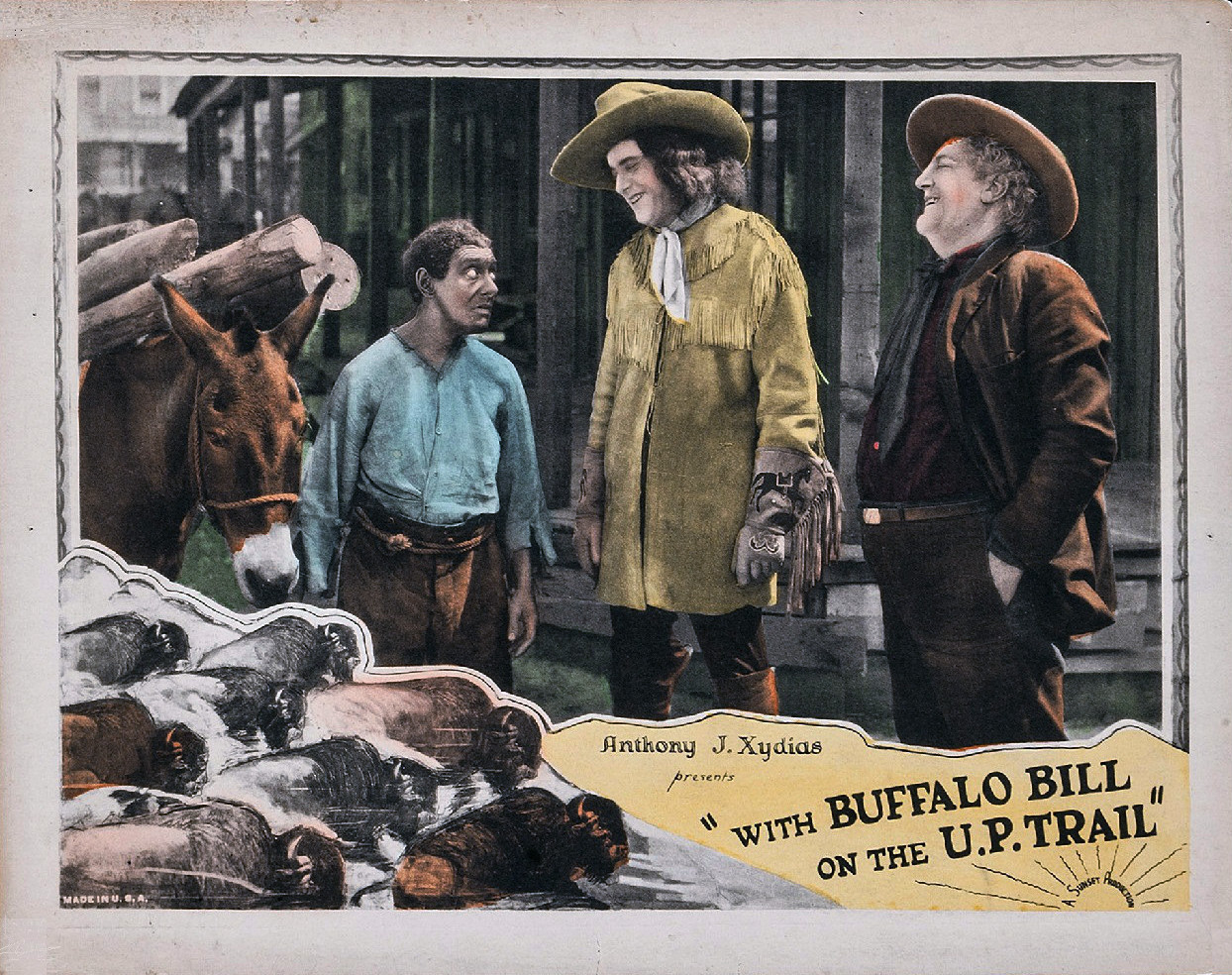
- Lobby card
- Directed by: Frank S. Mattison
- Produced by: Anthony J. Xydias; Sunset Productions
- Starring: Roy Stewart; Kathryn McGuire
- Cinematography: Bert Longenecker
- Edited by: Al Martin
- Production company: Sunset Productions
- Distributed by: Aywon Film Corporation
- Release date: March 1, 1926
- Running time: 6 reels
- Country: United States
- Languages: Silent; English intertitles

With Buffalo Bill on the U.P. Trail, alternately called Buffalo Bill on the U.P. Trail, is a 1926 American silent historical Western film starring Roy Stewart as Buffalo Bill Cody. It was directed by Frank Mattison and produced by Anthony J. Xydias.

This film is available from the Prelinger Archives, San Francisco and the Grapevine video, Phoenix, and is preserved at the Library of Congress.

Several members of the cast and crew of this film later worked on General Custer at the Little Big Horn (1926).

== Cast ==
- Roy Stewart as Buffalo Bill Cody
- Kathryn McGuire as Millie Connel
- Cullen Landis as Gordon Kent
- Sheldon Lewis as Major Mike Connel
- Earl Metcalfe as Sheriff
- Jay Morley as Parson Jim Hale
- Milburn Morante as Hearts Farrel (credited as Milburn Moranti)
- Eddie Harris as Mose
- Fred DeSilva as Bill Henry
- Hazel Howell as Katy Hale
- Felix Whitefeather as White Spear
- Dick La Reno as William Rose
- Harry Fenwick as Dr. Roy Webb

== See also ==
- In the Days of Buffalo Bill
- Fighting with Buffalo Bill
