= Lightning Range =

1933 film

- Directed by: Victor Adamson
- Written by: L. V. Jefferson
- Produced by: Victor Adamson
- Starring: Buddy Roosevelt; Patsy Bellamy; Lafe McKee
- Cinematography: Brydon Baker
- Production company: Victor Adamson Productions
- Distributed by: Superior Talking Pictures
- Release date: November 29, 1933
- Running time: 53 minutes
- Country: United States
- Language: English

Lightning Range is a 1933 American Western film directed by Victor Adamson and starring Buddy Roosevelt, Patsy Bellamy and Lafe McKee.

== Cast ==
- Buddy Roosevelt as Deputy Marshal Buddy
- Patsy Bellamy as Dorothy Horton
- Lafe McKee as Judge Williams
- Olin Francis as Black Pete
- Si Jenks as Hezekiah Simmons
- Anne Howard as Hester
- Bartlett A. Carre as Jim
- Ken Broeker as Sheriff
- William Barrymore as Boob
- Clyde McClary as Miner
- Betty Butler as Eastern Girl
- Jack Evans as Jack Knife
- Jack Bronston as Deputy Sheriff
- Victor Adamson as Bridegroom

== Bibliography ==
- Michael R. Pitts. Poverty Row Studios, 1929–1940: An Illustrated History of 55 Independent Film Companies, with a Filmography for Each. McFarland & Company, 2005.
