= Roped by Radio =

1925 film directed by Denver Dixon

- Directed by: Denver Dixon
- Produced by: Denver Dixon
- Starring: Art Mix; Dorothy Lee; Wilbur McGaugh
- Release date: April 22, 1925 (US)
- Running time: 5 reels
- Country: United States
- Language: English

Roped by Radio is a 1925 American silent film directed by Denver Dixon, and starring Art Mix, Dorothy Lee and Wilbur McGaugh. It premiered on April 22, 1925, in Galveston, Texas.

== Cast ==
- Art Mix (billed as George Kesterson) as Cal Roberts
- Dorothy Lee as Barbara Hutton
- Wilbur McGaugh as Steve Crosby
- Grace Weed as Olive Green
- Lafe McKee as Hard Coin Hoover
- Clyde McClary as Webb Crowler
- A. W. Dearie as Sheriff
