= Paths of Flame =

1926 film directed by Denver Dixon

- Directed by: Denver Dixon
- Produced by: Denver Dixon
- Starring: Art Mix; Dorothy Lee; Bill Patton
- Release date: July 2, 1926 (US)
- Running time: 5 reels
- Country: United States
- Language: English

Paths of Flame is a 1926 American silent film directed by Denver Dixon, and starring Art Mix, Dorothy Lee and Bill Patton. It premiered on July 2, 1926, in Poughkeepsie, New York.
