= Frances Burroughs =

American film editor

- Born: Frances May Burroughs; August 16, 1900; Illinois, USA
- Died: June 10, 1998 (aged 97); Lake Forest, California, USA
- Spouse: Donald Lewis (m. 1928)

Frances Burroughs was an American film editor who worked on Victor Adamson's low-budget Western B movies of the 1930s.

== Selected filmography ==
- Desert Mesa (1935)
- Boss Cowboy (1934)
- The Rawhide Terror (1934)
- Range Riders (1934)
- Rawhide Romance (1934)
- Riding Speed (1934)
- Circle Canyon (1933)
- The Fighting Cowboy (1933)
