= The Old Oregon Trail (film) =

1928 American silent film directed by Denver Dixon

- Directed by: Denver Dixon
- Written by: Denver Dixon
- Produced by: Denver Dixon
- Starring: F. C. Rose; Delores Booth
- Cinematography: Paul Allen
- Edited by: J. B. Sills
- Production company: Art Mix Productions
- Release date: 1928 (US)
- Running time: 50 minutes
- Country: United States
- Language: English

The Old Oregon Trail is a 1928 American silent film directed by Denver Dixon, starring F. C. Rose and Delores Booth.

== Cast ==
- F. C. Rose as Thomas Mercer
- Delores Booth as Billie Mercer
- Art Seales as The squatter
- Grace Underwood as The mother
- Sid Seales as The teamster
- Art Mix as The Cowboy from Pasco [aka Calamity Joe]
