= Boss Cowboy =

1934 film

- Directed by: Victor Adamson
- Screenplay by: Betty Burbridge
- Produced by: Victor Adamson
- Starring: Buddy Roosevelt; Frances Morris; Sam Pierce
- Cinematography: Brydon Baker
- Edited by: Frances Burroughs
- Production company: Victor Adamson Productions
- Distributed by: Superior Talking Pictures
- Release date: May 13, 1934
- Running time: 51 minutes
- Country: United States
- Language: English

Boss Cowboy is a 1934 Western B movie remake of Rough Ridin' (1924)produced and directed by low-budget independent filmmaker Victor Adamson and starring Buddy Roosevelt.

== Plot ==
Hard-riding ranch owner Dick Taylor hunts for a band of cattle rustlers in the Arizona ranch country.

== Cast ==
- Buddy Roosevelt as Dick Taylor
- Frances Morris as Mary Ross
- Sam Pierce as Tom Ross
- George Chesebro as Jack Kearns
- Fay McKenzie as Sally Nolan
- Lafe McKee as Nolan
- Clyde McClary as Tubby
- Merrill McCormick as Pete Larkin
- Allen Holbrook as Slim
- Bud Osborne as Sheriff

== Reception ==
Rodgers reportedly received a deluge of fan mail following the film's opening run, and critics generally deemed it a success.
