= William Barrymore =

William Barrymore may refer to:

- William Barrymore (stage actor) (1759–1830), British stage actor
- William Barrymore (film actor) (1899–1979), Russian-born American film actor
