= Riders of Border Bay =

1924 film directed by Denver Dixon

- Directed by: Denver Dixon
- Produced by: Denver Dixon
- Starring: Art Mix
- Release date: February 16, 1925
- Running time: 5 reels
- Country: United States
- Language: English

Riders of Border Bay is a 1925 American silent western film directed by Denver Dixon, and starring Art Mix. It premiered on February 16, 1925, in Indianapolis, Indiana.
