= The Rawhide Terror =

1934 film

- Theatrical release poster
- Directed by: Bruce M. Mitchell; Jack Nelson
- Screenplay by: Jack Nelson
- Story by: Victor Adamson
- Produced by: Victor Adamson
- Starring: Art Mix; Edmund Cobb; William Desmond; William Barrymore; Frances Morris
- Cinematography: A.J. Fitzpatrick; Bert Longenecker
- Edited by: Frances Burroughs
- Production company: Victor Adamson Productions
- Distributed by: Superior Talking Pictures (United States); Equity British Films (United Kingdom)
- Release dates: 2 December 1934 (United States); 22 October 1936 (London)
- Running time: 47 minutes
- Country: United States
- Language: English

The Rawhide Terror is a 1934 American horror Western film directed by Bruce M. Mitchell and Jack Nelson.

== Plot summary ==
A gang of renegades disguised as Native Americans murder the parents of two brothers, as a result, the brothers separate. Ten years later, a stranger known as the Rawhide Terror begins murdering the renegades, who have now become citizens of the local town called Red Dog. As the town attempts to track down the killer, the two brothers reenter each others' lives and the identity of the killer is soon revealed.

== Cast ==
- Art Mix as Al, a Blake ranch hand
- Edmund Cobb as Sheriff
- William Desmond as Tom Blake, Betty's older brother
- William Barrymore as Brent
- Frances Morris as Betty Blake
- George Holt as Renegade leader
- Bill Patton as Renegade
- Herman Hack as Deputy Hack
- Tommy Bupp as Jimmy Brent
- Fred Parker as Pappy / Banker

== Production ==
The Rawhide Terror was the final screen collaboration between Victor Adamson and George Kesterson (under his stage name Art Mix), the latter of whom Adamson's company was named after. Originally envisioned as a movie serial titled The Pueblo Terror, it was later cut from its original 52 minute length and converted into a 46–47 minute feature film when funding for the film fell through. In spite of this, the film has been incorrectly listed under its original 52 minute runtime.

== Release ==
=== Home media ===
The film was released on DVD by Image Entertainment as a part of its "Creepy Cowboys: Four Weird Westerns" film pack on April 25, 2006. It was later released by Alpha Video on January 31, 2011.

== Reception ==
The Rawhide Terror has received no attention from mainstream critics. Reviews that exist on the film have been mostly negative, with many calling the film "sloppy" and "crudely made". Author Michael R. Pitts criticized the film, calling it "a failed experiment in the mixing of two fairly distinct genres", and criticized the film's poor cinematography, and lack of plot continuity. Hans J. Wollstein from Allmovie called it "convincingly eerie, in no small measure due to a potent performance by the mystery killer". Max Sparber from Wildest West.com awarded the film 1/5 stars, writing, "A Poverty Row Western about a weird, revenging figure with a rawhide strap across his face, made by filmmakers who seemed to understand the pleasures of pulp fiction without having any idea how to put it on the screen."
