= Bill Nestell =

American actor

- Born: William Eugene Nestel; March 3, 1893; San Francisco California, U.S.
- Died: October 18, 1966 (aged 73); Bishop, California, U.S.
- Occupation: Actor
- Years active: 1926–1950
- Spouses: Sophie M. Prewitt (m. 1911; died 1922); Clara Butterbredt (m. 1923)
- Children: 2

Bill Nestell (born William Eugene Nestel or Eugene William Nestel; March 3, 1893 – October 18, 1966) was an American supporting actor seen most frequently in the westerns of Republic and Universal Studios, and also a radio singer. He appeared in more than 125 films between 1926 and 1950, uncredited in all but a handful.

== Early life and career ==
Born in San Francisco, California, Nestell was the son of Katherine "Katie" Drake and stage actor Edward "Ned" Westell, who died just two years later, at age 56. His mother remarried shortly thereafter, to blacksmith Alfred Connors. By 1910, however, Nestell had moved out. Having evidently picked up the essentials of blacksmithing and thus, at least temporarily, followed in the footsteps of his stepfather, he had nonetheless resumed use of his birth father's name.

During the late 1920s, Nestell gained some prominence as "California's singing cowboy." Initially heard as a solo act, featured at least semi-regularly on KELW in Burbank, California, he later expanded the act to what became known as the Trail Herd Quartet, led by Nestell and featuring Gilbert "Pee Wee" Holmes, Everett Cheetham, and Drew Stanfield. Aside from the radio station, the group was reportedly featured in the 1930 western Bar-L Ranch, both on the soundtrack and in assorted non-musical supporting roles onscreen.

== Personal life and death ==
From November 1911 until her death in 1922, Westell was married to Sophie M. Prewitt, with whom he had two children, a daughter and a son, prizefighter Robert Edward "Bob" Westell. In September 1923, he married Clara Butterbredt.

Following a series of strokes, Westell died at his home in Bishop, California on October 18, 1966 from a heart attack. He was survived by his wife and children.

== Selected filmography ==
- Sir Lumberjack (1926)
- When the Law Rides (1928)
- Cheyenne Trails (1928)
- The Fighting Legion (1930)
- Desert Vengeance (1931)
- The Night Riders (1939)
- New Frontier (1939)
- Three Faces West (1940)
