= Pony Express Rider (1926 film) =

1926 film

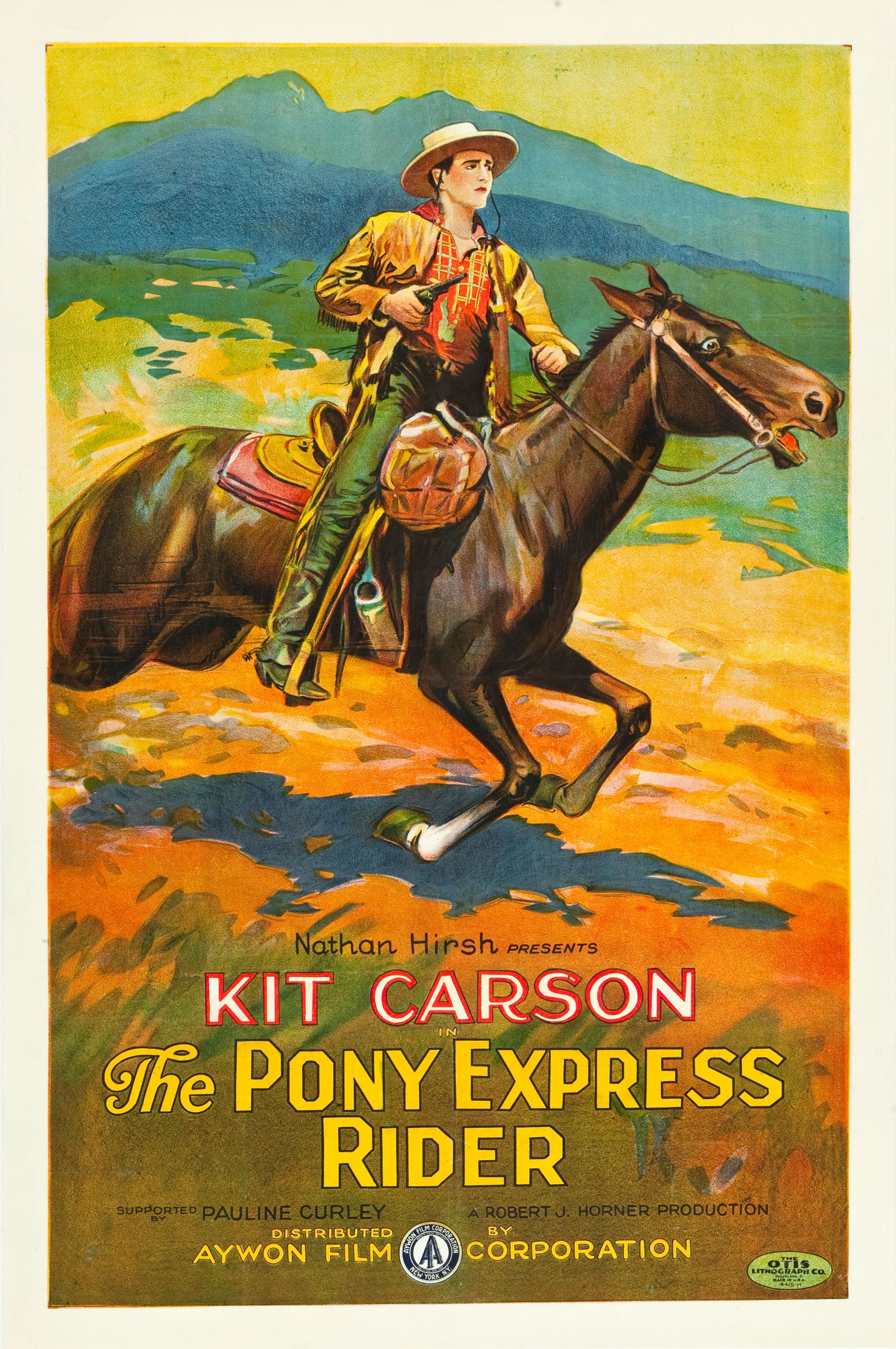
- Directed by: Robert J. Horner
- Produced by: Robert J. Horner
- Starring: William Barrymore; Pauline Curley
- Cinematography: Jack Draper
- Production company: Robert J. Horner Productions
- Distributed by: Aywon Film Corporation
- Release date: March 27, 1926
- Running time: 50 minutes
- Country: United States
- Languages: Silent; English intertitles

Pony Express Rider is a 1926 American silent Western film directed by Robert J. Horner and starring William Barrymore and Pauline Curley.

== Cast ==
- William Barrymore as Bill Miller
- Pauline Curley

== Bibliography ==
- Langman, Larry. A Guide to Silent Westerns. Greenwood Publishing Group, 1992.
