= The Passing of Wolf MacLean =

1924 film

- Directed by: Paul Hurst
- Written by: George Hively
- Story by: Bernard D. Russell
- Produced by: Jack Mower
- Starring: Jack Mower
- Production company: Ermine Productions
- Distributed by: Usla Company
- Release date: November 29, 1924
- Running time: 5 reels
- Country: United States
- Languages: Silent; English intertitles

The Passing of Wolf MacLean is a 1924 silent Western film directed by Paul Hurst and produced by and starring Jack Mower.

== Plot ==
As described in a review in a film magazine, Bert Granger (Fenton) gambles, drinks and runs a saloon in which his two children, Benny (Fox) and Alice (Rayford), are the entertainers. The Stranger (Mower) comes along, stops a drinking bout, gets into a fight and is victorious. After that he and Alice become interested in one another. Bert loses his property to card sharps. Young Benny sees a big reward for the arrest of “Wolf MacLean” and, as the Stranger tallies with the description, he arrests him. The old man reforms and makes Benny a partner in a new grocery business. Benny aids the Stranger to escape. The Stranger is just about to be hanged by the card sharks when Parson Williams (Hallett) makes known that he is the criminal and that the sharks are his confederates.

== Cast ==
- Jack Mower as Wolf MacLean, a stranger (credited as Jack Meehan)
- Johnny Fox as Benny Granger (credited as Johnnie Fox)
- Alma Rayford as Alice Granger
- Mark Fenton as Bert Granger
- Al Hallett as Parson Dan Williams

== Preservation ==
With no prints of The Passing of Wolf MacLean located in any film archives, it is a lost film.
