= The Way of the West =

1934 film by Robert Emmett Tansey

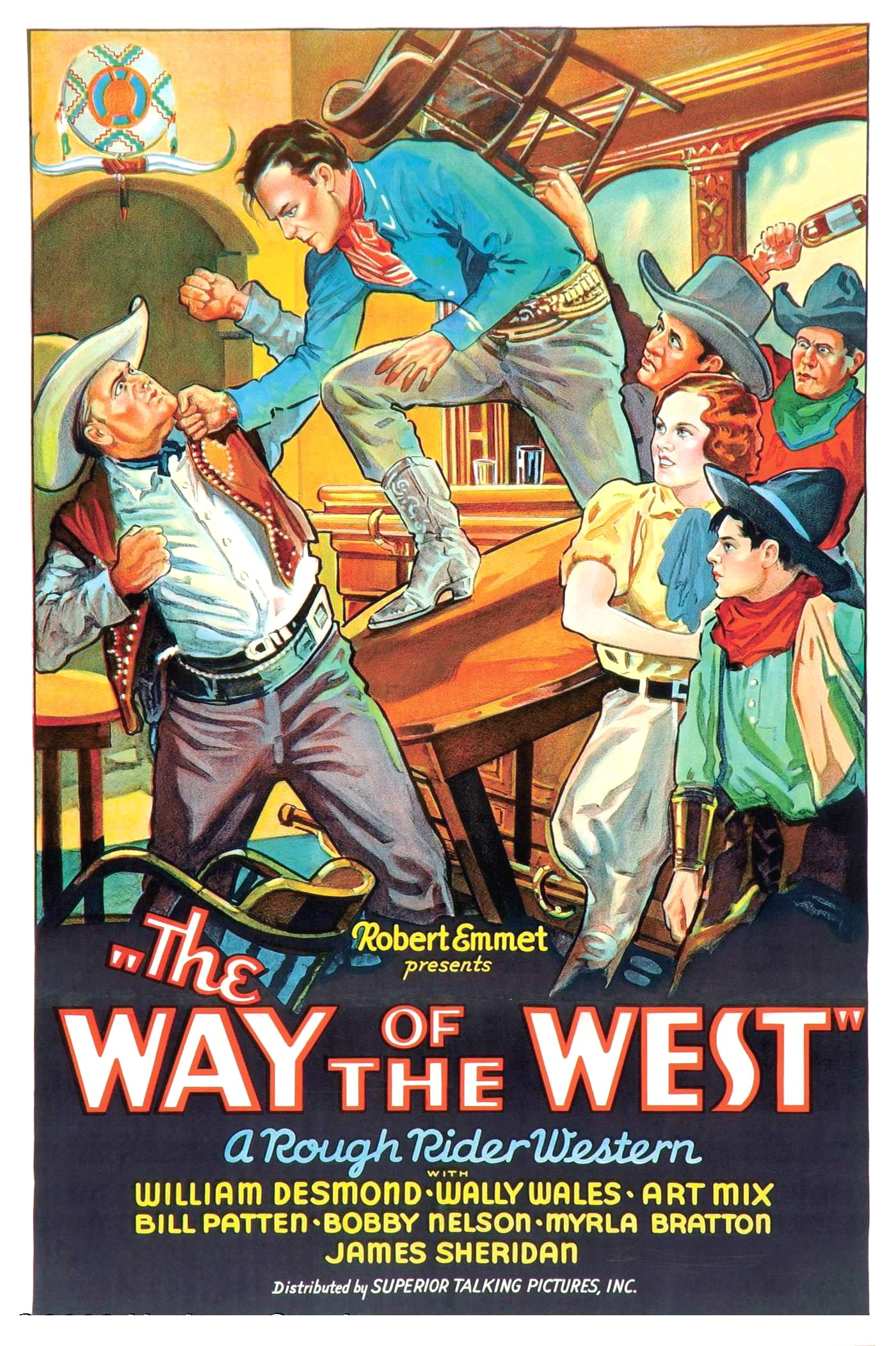
- Theatrical release poster
- Directed by: Robert Emmett Tansey
- Written by: Barry Barringer (writer); Robert Emmett Tansey (story)
- Produced by: Robert Emmett Tansey
- Starring: See below
- Cinematography: Brydon Baker
- Edited by: Arthur Cohen
- Release date: October 15, 1934
- Running time: 55 minutes
- Country: United States
- Language: English

The Way of the West is a 1934 American Western film directed by Robert Emmett Tansey. William Desmond, Wally Wales, and Myrla Brattan star.

== Plot ==
The story concerns "the ever-present fight between the cattlemen and the sheep-herders".

== Cast ==
- Wally Wales as Wally Gordon
- Bobby Nelson as Bobby Parker
- Myrla Brattan as "Fiery" Parker
- Fred Parker as Dad Parker
- William Desmond as 'Cash' Horton
- Art Mix as Henchman Tim
- James Sheridan as Henchman Skippy
- Bill Patton as Buck
- Jack Jones as Sheriff #2 - Jed Hampton
- Harry Beery as Older Cowhand
- Helen Gibson as Townswoman
- Tiny Skelton as Tiny (ranch hand)
- Gene Layman as Jeff Thompson
- Jimmy Aubrey as Sheriff #1 / Bartender Jim
