= The Lost Trail (1926 film) =

1926 film directed by J. P. McGowan

The Lost Trail is a 1926 American silent film made by Anchor Film Distributors. It was distributed by Rayart Pictures and released in May 1926. It was directed by J. P. McGowan and used a story by Charles Saxton. It starred Al Hoxie, Alma Rayford, Leon De La Mothe, Frank Ellis, Slim Whitaker, Andrew Waldron, and L.J. O'Connor.

== Preservation ==
With no holdings located in archives, The Lost Trail is considered a lost film.
