= Walloping Kid =

1926 film

- Directed by: Robert J. Horner
- Written by: Robert J. Horner
- Produced by: Robert J. Horner
- Starring: William Barrymore; Jack Richardson; Frank Whitson
- Cinematography: Bert Baldridge
- Production company: Robert J. Horner Productions
- Distributed by: Aywon Film Corporation
- Release date: January 5, 1926
- Running time: 50 minutes
- Country: United States
- Languages: Silent; English intertitles

Walloping Kid is a 1926 American silent Western film directed by Robert J. Horner and starring William Barrymore, Jack Richardson and Frank Whitson.

== Cast ==
- William Barrymore as The Walloping Kid
- Jack Richardson as Don Dawson
- Dorothy Ward as Sally Carter
- Frank Whitson as Sally's father
- Al Kaufman as Wild Cat McKee
- Jack Herrick as Battling Lewis
- Pauline Curley

== Bibliography ==
- Langman, Larry. A Guide to Silent Westerns. Greenwood Publishing Group, 1992.
