= Vanishing Hoofs =

1926 film

- Directed by: John P. McCarthy
- Written by: Betty Burbridge; L. V. Jefferson
- Production companies: Action Pictures, Inc
- Distributed by: Weiss Brothers Artclass Pictures
- Release date: March 28, 1926
- Running time: 5 reels
- Country: United States
- Languages: Silent; English intertitles

Vanishing Hoofs is a 1926 American silent Western film directed by John P. McCarthy and written by Betty Burbridge and L. V. Jefferson.

== Cast ==
- Hal Taliaferro as Wally Marsh
- Alma Rayford as Lucy Bowers
- William Ryno as Colonel Bowers
- Hazel Keener as Edith Marsh
- Frank Ellis as Jack Warren
- William Dunn as Jack Slade
- Jane Sherman as kate
- Slim Whitaker as the doctor
- W. J. Willett as the sheriff
