= Anthony J. Xydias =

American film producer

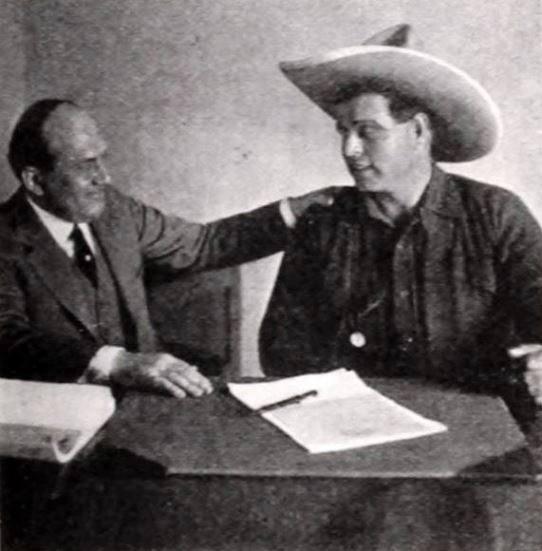
- Anthony J. Xydias and actor Jack Hoxie from a 1922 magazine
- Born: May 22, 1879; Tinos, Greece
- Died: October 27, 1952 (aged 73); Los Angeles
- Occupation: Film producer
- Years active: 1922–37

Anthony J. Xydias (May 22, 1882 – October 27, 1952) was a film producer for such films as Heroes of the Alamo (1937), Devil's Canyon (1935), and Five Bad Men (1935). His career took off after he opened a theater in Dallas, Texas, in 1906. From this came a chain of successful theaters. He founded the film production company Sunset Pictures in 1922.

== Career ==
A Greek-born American film executive, Anthony J. Xydias became a successful film exhibitor before founding Sunset Pictures in 1922. He wanted to produce inexpensive Westerns starring former rodeo rider Jack Hoxie beginning with Barb Wire (1922). Despite their meager budgets, the Hoxie oaters proved well above par for the period, but Xydias found himself without a star when Hoxie left Sunset Pictures in favor of Universal Pictures. Kenneth MacDonald, whom Xydias chose from the ranks of supporting players, did not fill the bill and was quickly replaced by J. B. Warner, a lanky cowboy from Nebraska. Warner died of tuberculosis after only six Westerns.

Xydias then turned his attention to saluting the country that had received him so warmly by producing a series of historical melodramas featuring heroes from America's past. In short order, Sunset released With Kit Carson Over the Great Divide (1925), With Buffalo Bill on the U. P. Trail (1926), Daniel Boone Through the Wilderness (1926), Davy Crockett at the Fall of the Alamo (1926), General Custer at the Little Big Horn (1926), and finally, Sitting Bull at the Spirit Lake Massacre (1927). He retired due to ill health in 1931.

Xydias returned to the scene six years later with the promise of remaking his six historical epics with sound. Only Heroes of the Alamo (1937) was actually produced to coincide with the Texas Centennial Exposition. It proved the slipshod affair expected from the veteran penny pincher. The film reused the silent battle scenes from Davy Crockett at the Fall of the Alamo and was later sold to Columbia Pictures with Xydias's name removed from the credits when Columbia released it in 1938.

Retired from the movie business following the less than spectacular reception of Heroes of the Alamo, Xydias was caught behind enemy lines while visiting the Philippines in 1941. He spent the duration of the war in the infamous Santo Tomas Internment Camp.

== Personal life ==
Xydias was born on Tinos, Greece. He died on October 27, 1952. He was married and had two children.

== Partial filmography ==
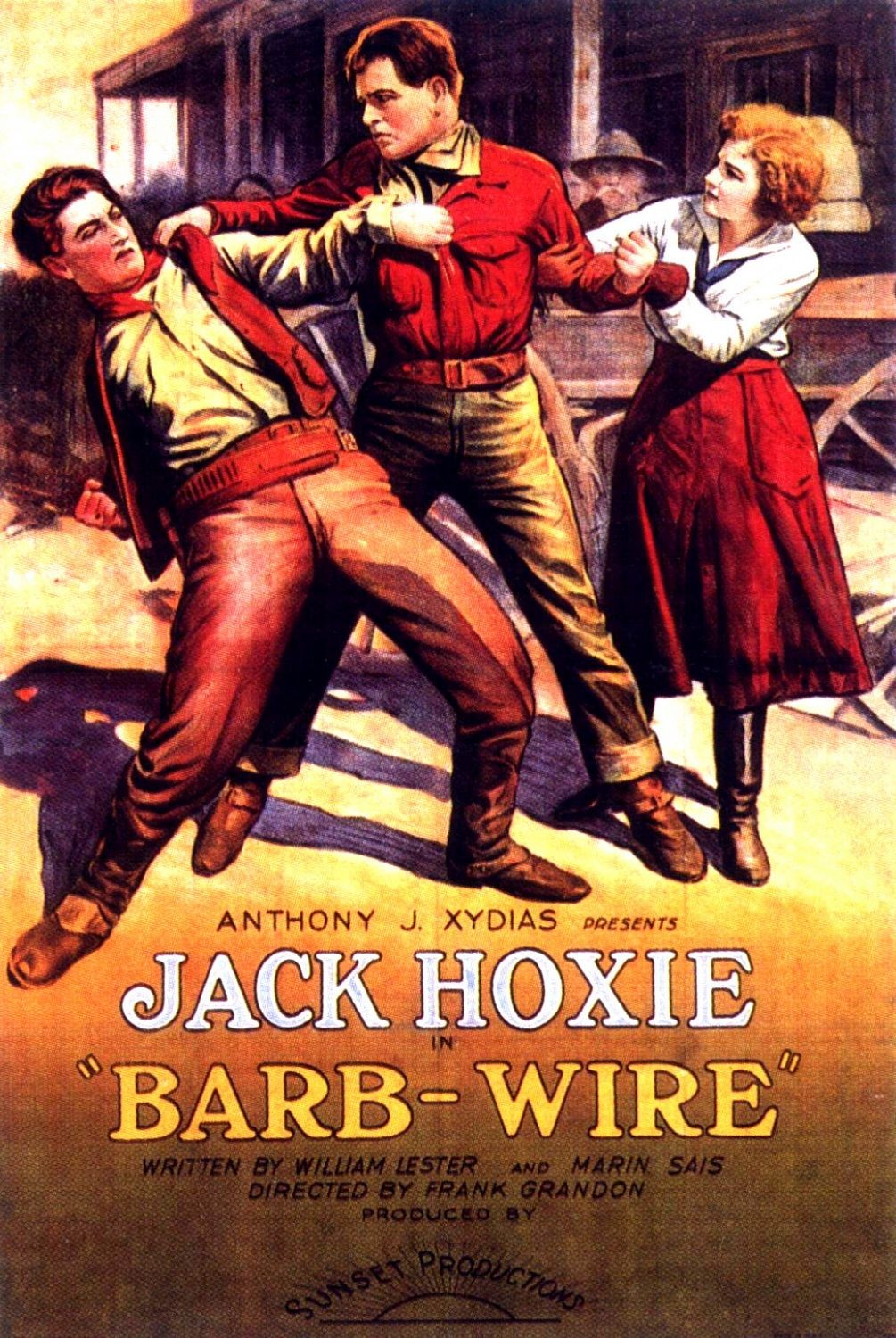
Barb Wire (1922) was the first Sunset Pictures release.

- Barb Wire (1922)
- Back Fire (1922)
- The Crow's Nest (1922)
- Gallopin' Through (1923)
- Desert Rider (1923)
- Lone Fighter (1923)
- Wolf Tracks (1923)
- Slow as Lightning (1923)
- After a Million (1924)
- The Covered Trail (1924)
- Behind Two Guns (1924)
- Wanted by the Law (1924)
- Yankee Speed (1924)
- The Hellion (1924)
- Dynamite Dan (1924)
- With Kit Carson Over the Great Divide (1925)
- With Davy Crockett at the Fall of the Alamo (1926)
- With Buffalo Bill on the U. P. Trail (1926)
- Daniel Boone Thru the Wilderness (1926)
- Davy Crockett at the Fall of the Alamo (1926)
- General Custer at the Little Big Horn (1926)
- Sitting Bull at the Spirit Lake Massacre (1927)
- Devil's Canyon (1935)
- Five Bad Men (1935)
- Heroes of the Alamo (1937)
