= Border Devils =

1932 film

- Directed by: William Nigh
- Written by: Harry L. Fraser
- Produced by: Louis Weiss; George M. Merrick; Alfred T. Mannon
- Starring: Harry Carey; Kathleen Collins; Gabby Hayes
- Cinematography: William H. Dietz
- Edited by: Holbrook Todd
- Production companies: Supreme Features, Inc.
- Distributed by: State Rights
- Release date: April 4, 1932
- Running time: 63 or 65 minutes
- Country: United States
- Language: English

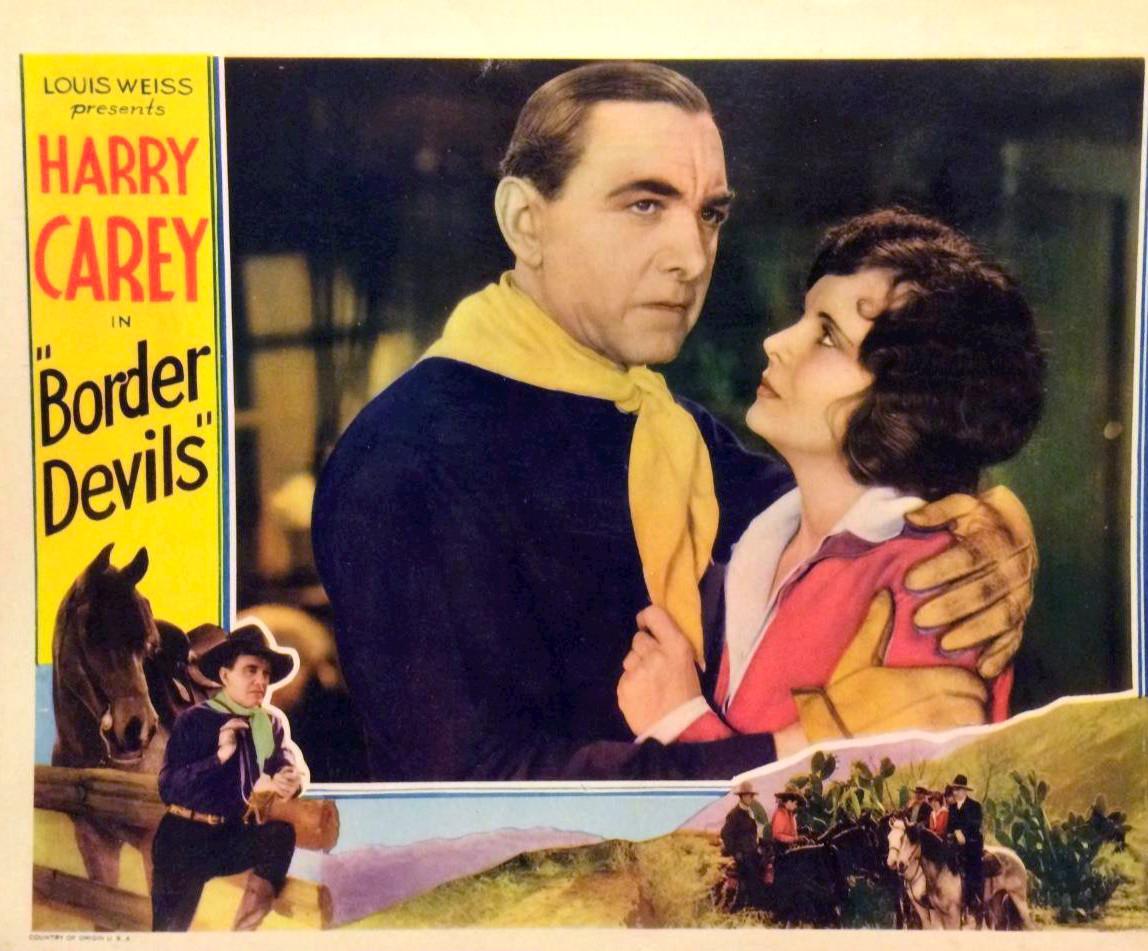
Lobby card for the American western film Border Devils (1932) with Harry Carey and Kathleen Collins (1903 – 1994).

Border Devils is a 1932 pre-Code American Western black and white sound film directed by William Nigh and starring Harry Carey, Kathleen Collins, and Gabby Hayes. The film is Collins's last role and her only sound film.

== Plot ==
A man, Jim Gray, is wrongfully put in jail; he escapes to prove his innocence and reveal the real criminal. In the process, Gray discovers a second criminal who has been working behind the scenes with the more obvious villain.

== Cast ==
- Harry Carey as Jim Gray
- Kathleen Collins as Marcia Brandon
- Gabby Hayes as Dude Sanders
- Niles Welch as Tom Hope
- Olive Carey as Ethel Denham
- Albert J. Smith as Inspector Bell
- Merrill McCormick as Jose Lopez
- Art Mix as Bud Brandon
- Tetsu Komai as The General

== Production ==
=== Script ===
The film was written by Harry P. Crist ( credited for "script and continuity' under this pen name is the American director Harry Fraser). The story was based upon the novel Dead Man's Shoes, by Murray Leinster.

=== Shooting ===
According to a contemporary issue of The Film Daily, certain scenes were filmed in Palm Springs, California.

== Cast ==
The film features Gabby Hayes in one of his earliest credited roles, a sidekick figure that would become his signature character.

== Release ==
Border Devils was theatrically released in the United States on April 4, 1932. The film was released on DVD in August 2011 by Alpha Video.

== Themes ==
This film has been noted for the unexpected presence in a Western, of Yellow Peril themes, embodied in the character of the villain, a mysterious 'oriental' criminal figure known as the General.

Commentators generally underline the weight of the original novel, a typical Leinster tale, in this adaptation: "the massive conspiracy that figures in his sci-fi, the shifting identity of the hero, and the generally peripatetic nature of the tale as our cowboy commandos shuttle hither and yon like horsing lot attendant."
