= Cheyenne Trails =

1928 film

- Directed by: Robert J. Horner
- Written by: Bert Ames; Robert J. Horner
- Produced by: Robert J. Horner
- Starring: Ted Wells; Bud Osborne; William Barrymore
- Cinematography: Jack Draper
- Edited by: William Austin
- Production company: Robert J. Horner Productions
- Distributed by: Associated Independent Producers
- Release date: November 28, 1928
- Running time: 50 minutes
- Country: United States
- Languages: Silent; English intertitles

Cheyenne Trails is a 1928 American silent Western film directed by Robert J. Horner and starring Ted Wells, Bud Osborne and William Barrymore.

== Cast ==
- Ted Wells
- Bud Osborne
- Ione Reed
- William Barrymore
- Bill Nestell
