= Barb Wire (1922 film) =

1922 film

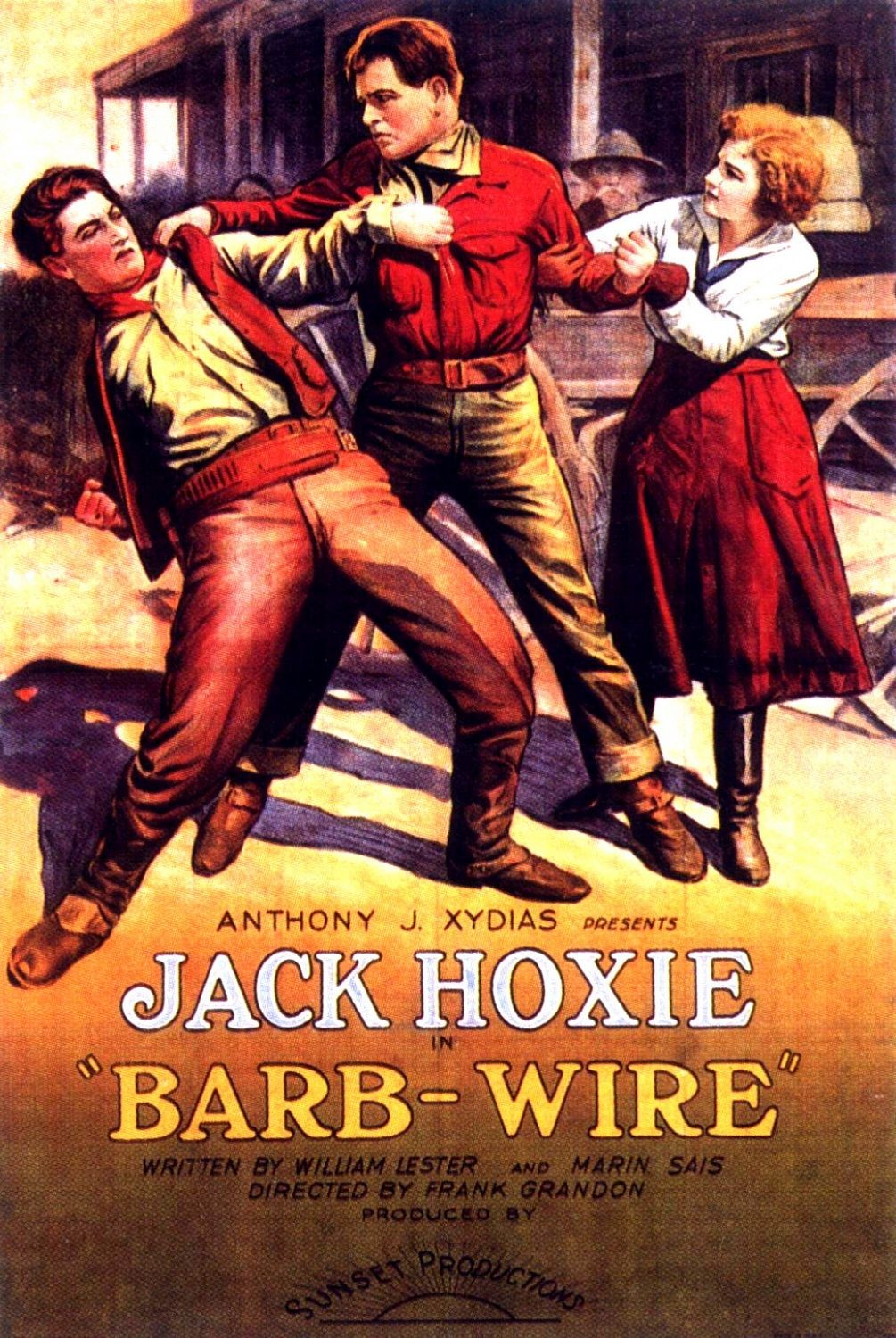
- Directed by: Francis J. Grandon
- Written by: William Berke; Marin Sais
- Produced by: Anthony J. Xydias
- Starring: Jack Hoxie; Jean Porter; Joseph McDermott
- Cinematography: William Nobles
- Production company: Sunset Productions
- Distributed by: Aywon Film Corporation
- Release date: June 1922
- Running time: 50 minutes
- Country: United States
- Languages: Silent; English intertitles

Barb Wire is a 1922 American silent Western film directed by Francis J. Grandon and starring Jack Hoxie, Jean Porter and Joseph McDermott.

== Plot ==
Jack Harding is a landowner who defies a gang headed by Bart Moseby. Jack fences in his land claim with barbed wire, which angers Bart and his gang. Jack hides in his sweetheart's room to overhear Bart's plans to get him. Bart commits a crime and leaves Jack's hat and gun as evidence. At the trial, Jack's mother distracts the court while Jack leaps from the window to his horse. A fight between Jack and Bart follows as Jack brings Bart to justice.

== Cast ==
- Jack Hoxie as Jack Harding
- Jean Porter as Joan Lorne
- Olah Norman as Martha Harding
- William Berke as Bart Moseby
- Joseph McDermott as Nick Lazarre
- Jim Welch as Bob Lorne

== Preservation ==
With no holdings located in archives, Barb Wire is considered a lost film.
