= The Man from the Rio Grande (1924 film) =

1924 film directed by Denver Dixon

The Man From the Rio Grande
- Directed by: Denver Dixon
- Starring: Pauline Starke; Dorothy Lee
- Production company: Denver Dixon Productions
- Distributed by: Aywon Film Corp.
- Release date: November 30, 1924 (US)
- Running time: 5 reels
- Country: United States
- Language: English

The Man From the Rio Grande is a 1924 American silent Western film directed by Denver Dixon and starring Art Mix and Dorothy Lee. It premiered on November 30, 1924, in Indianapolis, Indiana.

== Cast list ==
- Art Mix as George Kesterson
- Dorothy Lee

== Censorship ==
Before The Man from the Rio Grande could be exhibited in Kansas, the Kansas Board of Review required the elimination of a close-up depicting electric wires being cut, and a struggle between "Evelyn" and a Chinese man.
