= Bobby Nelson (actor) =

American film actor

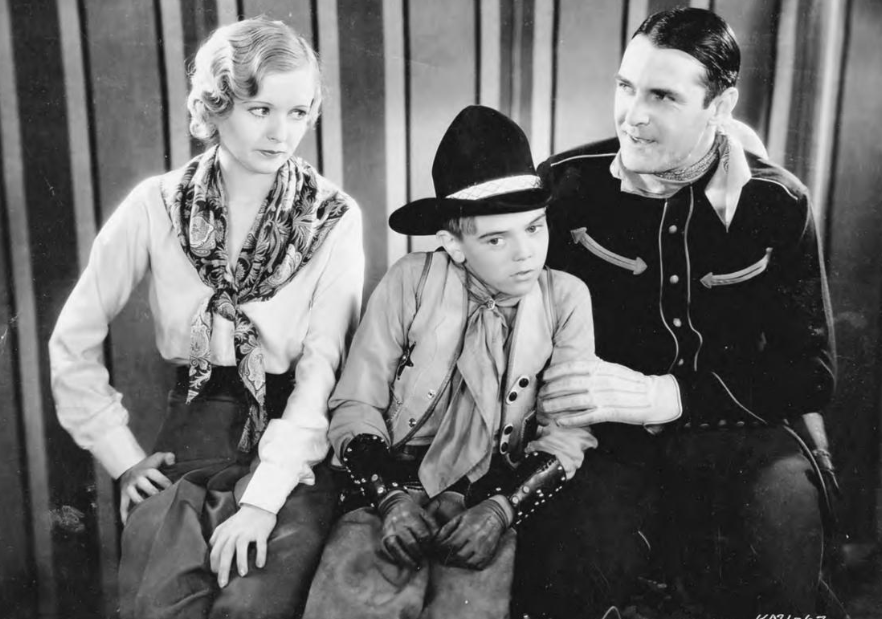
- Nelson (center) with Lucile Browne and Ken Maynard in King of the Arena, 1933
- Born: Robert Julius Nelson; January 17, 1922; Santa Monica, California, U.S.
- Died: December 5, 1974 (aged 52); Los Angeles, California, U.S.
- Occupation: Film actor
- Parent: Jack Nelson (father)

Robert Julius Nelson (January 17, 1922 – December 5, 1974) was an American film actor.

== Life and career ==
Nelson was born in Santa Monica, California, the son of Jack Nelson, an actor. He attended Lawler Private School. He began his screen career in 1926, appearing in the film The Fighting Boob. In the same year, he appeared in the films The Doughboy, The Border Whirlwind and Sunshine of Paradise Alley.

Later in his career, in 1928, Nelson starred as Mary Trevor's younger brother Bobby in the film Tarzan the Mighty, starring along with Frank Merrill, Al Ferguson and Natalie Kingston. He appeared in numerous films such as Bulldog Pluck, The Cowboy and the Bandit, The Spell of the Circus, Black Fury, Cyclone of the Saddle, The Ghost Rider, The Way of the West, The Gambling Terror, Heroes of the Flames, Two Fisted Justice, Oliver Twist and Gun Lords of Stirrup Basin.

Nelson retired from acting in 1937, last appearing in the film The Red Rope. After retiring from acting, he served as a private in the United States Army during World War II.

== Death ==
Nelson died of heart failure at the V.A. Wadsworth Hospital in Los Angeles, California on December 5, 1974, at the age of 52. He was buried at Los Angeles National Cemetery.
