= Sitting Bull at the Spirit Lake Massacre =

1927 film

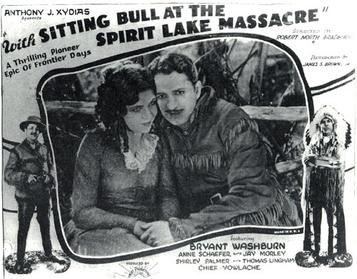
- Theatrical release poster
- Directed by: Robert N. Bradbury
- Written by: Ben Allah
- Produced by: Anthony J. Xydias
- Starring: Bryant Washburn; Chief Yowlachie; Anne Schaefer
- Cinematography: James S. Brown Jr.
- Edited by: Della M. King
- Production company: Sunset Productions
- Distributed by: Aywon Film Corporation
- Release date: June 15, 1927
- Country: United States
- Languages: Silent; English intertitles

Sitting Bull at the Spirit Lake Massacre (also known as With Sitting Bull at the Spirit Lake Massacre) is a 1927 American silent Western film directed by Robert N. Bradbury, and starring Bryant Washburn as Donald, Chief Yowlachie as Sitting Bull, and Anne Schaefer as Mame Mulcain.

== Cast ==
- Bryant Washburn as Donald Keefe
- Chief Yowlachie as Sitting Bull
- Anne Schaefer as Mame Mulcain
- Jay Morley as Paul Mulcain
- Shirley Palmer as Celia Moore
- James O'Neill as Little Bear
- Bob Steele as Bob Keefe (billed as Bob Bradbury Jr.)
- Fred Warren as "Happy" Hartz
- Leon Kent as John Mulcain
- Lucille Balart as Mary Moore
- Thomas Lingham as Parson Rogers

== See also ==
- Spirit Lake Massacre
