= Bulldog Pluck =

1927 film

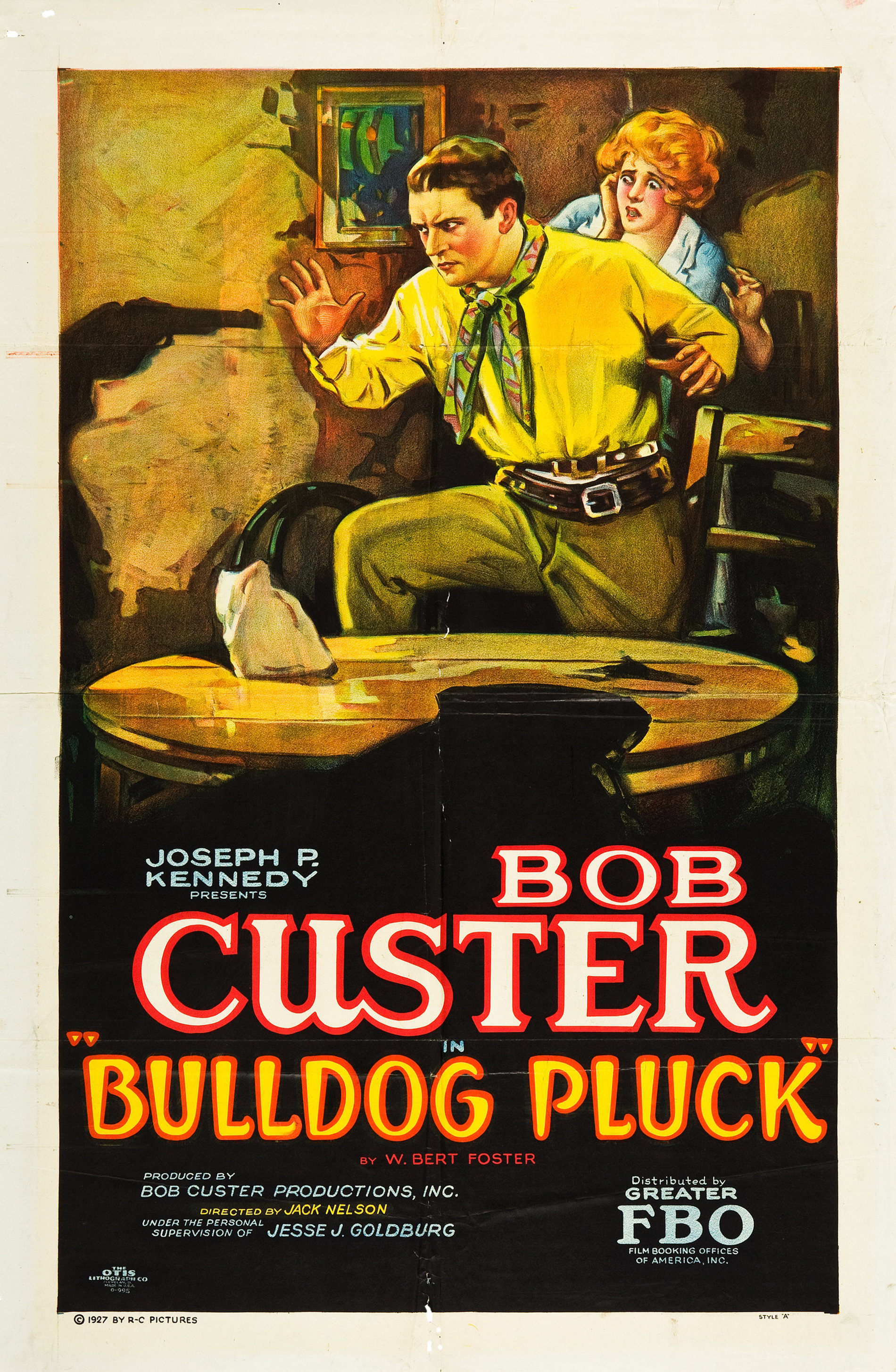
- Directed by: Jack Nelson
- Written by: Evanne Blasdale; Madeline Matzen
- Based on: story Harwick of Hambone by W. Bert Foster
- Produced by: Bob Custer; Jesse J. Goldburg; Joseph P. Kennedy
- Starring: Bob Custer; Viora Daniel; Bobby Nelson; Richard Neill
- Cinematography: Ernest Miller
- Production company: Bob Custer Productions
- Distributed by: Film Booking Offices of America; Ideal Films (UK)
- Release date: June 12, 1927
- Running time: 50 minutes
- Country: United States
- Languages: Silent; English intertitles

Bulldog Pluck is a 1927 American silent Western film directed by Jack Nelson and starring Bob Custer, Viora Daniel, Bobby Nelson and Richard Neill.

== Cast ==
- Bob Custer as Bob Hardwick
- Viora Daniel as Jess Haviland
- Bobby Nelson as Danny Haviland
- Richard Neill as Destin
- Walter Maly as Gillen
- Victor Metzetti as Curley Le Baste
- Hugh Saxon as Pa Haviland

== Bibliography ==
- Connelly, Robert B. The Silents: Silent Feature Films, 1910-36, Volume 40, Issue 2. December Press, 1998.
- Munden, Kenneth White. The American Film Institute Catalog of Motion Pictures Produced in the United States, Part 1. University of California Press, 1997.
