= Gun Smoke (1936 film) =

1936 film directed by Bartlett Carré

- Directed by: Bartlett Carré
- Story by: Clee Woods
- Produced by: Monte Montana
- Starring: Buck Coburn; Marion Shilling; Bud Osborne
- Cinematography: Harvey Gould
- Edited by: Roy Claire
- Production company: Willis Kent Productions
- Distributed by: State Rights
- Release date: January 1936 (US)
- Running time: 57 minutes
- Country: United States
- Language: English

Gun Smoke is a 1936 American Western film, directed by Bartlett Carré. It stars Buck Coburn, Marion Shilling, and Bud Osborne, and was released in January 1936.

== Cast ==
- Buck Coburn as Steve Branning
- Marion Shilling as Jean Culverson
- Bud Osborne as Haws McGee
- Ben Corbett as Shorty
- Henry Hall as George Culverson
- Roger Williams as Sam Parsons
- Dick Botiller as Felipe
- Nelson McDowell as Long Distance Jones
- Lloyd Ingraham as Eli Parker
- Tracy Layne as Pecos
- Philo McCullough as Abner Sneed
- Lafe McKee as Sheriff
- Phyllis Barrington as Mrs. Parker in Photo
