= Kathleen Collins (actress) =

American actress (1903–1994)

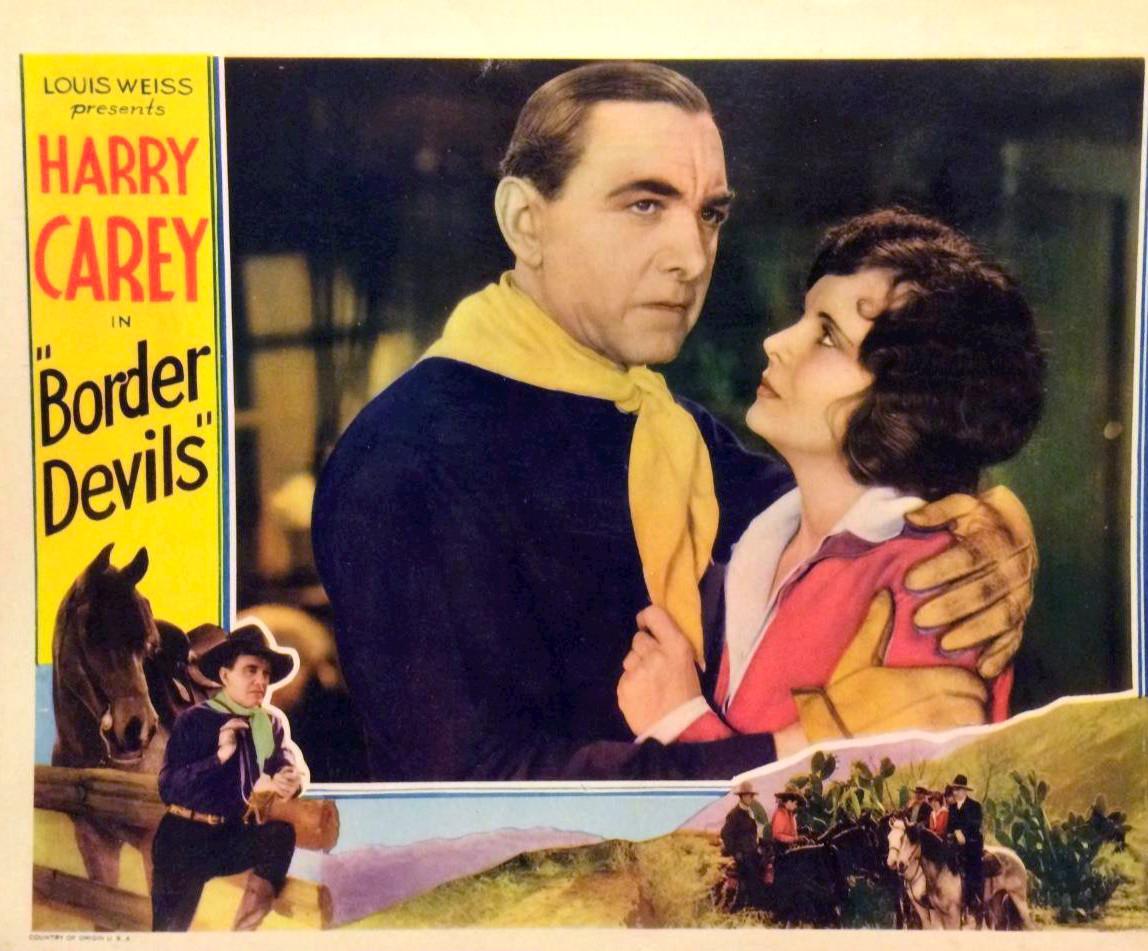
- Lobby card from Border Devils (1932) with Collins
- Born: September 22, 1903; San Antonio, Texas, United States
- Died: September 24, 1994 (aged 91); San Antonio, Texas, United States
- Occupation: Actress
- Years active: 1922–1932 (film)
- Spouse: Ralph Osborne (m. 1934)

Kathleen Collins (September 22, 1903 – September 24, 1994) was an American film actress of the silent era. Her final film, however, Border Devils, is a sound film (and for that matter her only 'talkie').

== Selected filmography ==
- The Country Flapper (1922)
- Cyclone Jones (1923)
- Wolfheart's Revenge (1925)
- Black Cyclone (1925)
- Satan Town (1926)
- Daniel Boone Thru the Wilderness (1926)
- The Unknown Cavalier (1926)
- The Overland Stage (1927)
- Quarantined Rivals (1927)
- Somewhere in Sonora (1927)
- The Devil's Saddle (1927)
- Burning Bridges (1928)
- The Valley of Hunted Men (1928)
- Fangs of Fate (1928)
- Two Outlaws (1928)
- The Border Patrol (1928)
- Grit Wins (1929)
- The Ridin' Demon (1929)
- Border Devils (1932)

== Bibliography ==
- Munden, Kenneth White. The American Film Institute Catalog of Motion Pictures Produced in the United States, Part 1. University of California Press, 1997.
