= The Outlaw Tamer =

1935 film directed by J. P. McGowan

- Directed by: J. P. McGowan
- Written by: J. Wesley Patterson; Kaye Northrup
- Produced by: Fred S. Hirsch; Nathan Hirsh
- Starring: Lane Chandler; Blanche Mehaffey; George 'Gabby' Hayes
- Cinematography: James Diamond
- Edited by: Charles Henkel Jr.
- Production company: Empire Pictures
- Distributed by: Empire Film Distributors
- Release date: March 15, 1935
- Running time: 56 minutes
- Country: United States
- Language: English

The Outlaw Tamer is a 1935 American Western film directed by J. P. McGowan and starring Lane Chandler, Blanche Mehaffey and George 'Gabby' Hayes.

== Plot ==
A posse on the trail of masked bandit loses the trail of the wounded man. He shelters at Jean Bennett's store and assists her and old gold prospector Cactus Barnes when they run into difficulties.

== Cast ==
- Lane Chandler as 'Tex' Broderick
- Blanche Mehaffey as Jean Bennett
- J.P. McGowan as Sheriff Jim Porter
- Slim Whitaker as Bowie Harris
- Ben Corbett as Deputy Bud McClure
- George 'Gabby' Hayes as Cactus Barnes
- Maston Williams as Blackie, Henchman
- Richard Cramer as Posse Sheriff
- Gertrude Chorre as Indian Servant

== Bibliography ==
- Pitts, Michael R. Poverty Row Studios, 1929–1940. McFarland & Company, 2005.
