= Two Outlaws =

1928 film directed by Henry MacRae

- Directed by: Henry MacRae
- Written by: Gardner Bradford; Henry MacRae; George Morgan
- Starring: Jack Perrin; Kathleen Collins
- Cinematography: Virgil Miller
- Edited by: Tom Malloy
- Production company: Universal Pictures
- Distributed by: Universal Pictures
- Release date: November 18, 1928
- Country: United States
- Languages: Silent; English intertitles

Two Outlaws is a 1928 American silent Western film directed by Henry MacRae and starring Jack Perrin and Kathleen Collins.

== Cast ==
- Jack Perrin as Phil Manners / The Lone Rider
- Rex the Wonder Horse as Rex, a Horse
- Starlight the Horse as Starlight, a Horse
- Kathleen Collins as Mary Ransome
- J.P. McGowan as Abner Whitcomb
- Cuyler Supplee as Other Man

== Bibliography ==
- Langman, Larry. A Guide to Silent Westerns. Greenwood Publishing Group, 1992.
