= The Eagle's Claw =

1924 film

- Directed by: Charles R. Seeling
- Written by: Donald I. Buchanan
- Produced by: Charles R. Seeling
- Starring: Guinn "Big Boy" Williams
- Edited by: Donald I. Buchanan
- Distributed by: Aywon Film Corporation
- Release date: February 10, 1924
- Running time: 56 minutes; 5 reels
- Country: United States
- Languages: Silent; English intertitles

The Eagle's Claw is a 1924 American silent Western film starring Guinn "Big Boy" Williams. It was produced and directed by Charles R. Seeling. Nathan Hirsh, of the Aywon Film Corporation, oversaw distribution.

The film is preserved in a foreign archive in Brussels. It is available on DVD from the Grapevine company in Phoenix, Arizona.

== Cast ==
- Guinn "Big Boy" Williams - Dan Carson (as Big Boy Williams)
- Lew Meehan - Zac Wilson (as Bill Guinn)
- Lafe McKee - John Sherwood

== Reception and release ==
Pictures and The Picturegoer called the film, "Fair entertainment for the unsophisticated."

The Eagle's Claw was released on Region 0 DVD-R by Alpha Video on July 7, 2015.
