= Nathan Hirsh =

American film producer

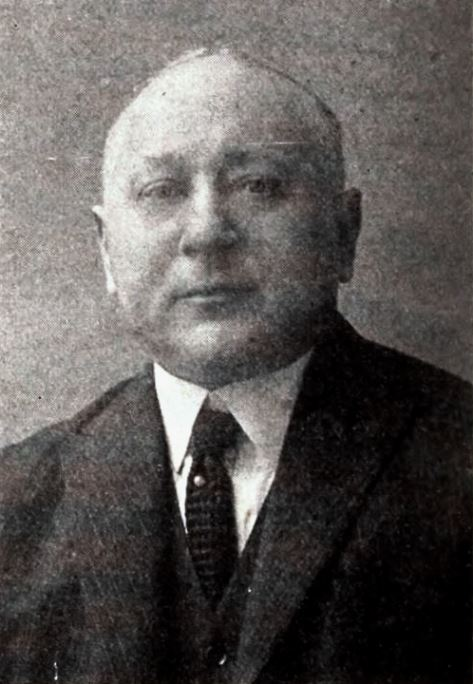
Hirsh in 1922

Nathan J. Hirsh (Romania, 1872 - New York City, March 19, 1956) was an American film producer who co-founded Aywon Film Corporation and Pioneer Film Corporation. He produced or co-produced twenty features of the 20s and 30s, and featured in a dozen movies as presenter.

== Selected filmography ==
- The Evolution of Man, also known as Jack the Man-Ape (1920)
- The Eagle's Claw (1924)
- Western Racketeers (1934)
- The Outlaw Tamer (1935)
