= Bartlett Carré =

American filmmaker, actor

- Born: July 10, 1897; Melrose, Massachusetts, United States
- Died: April 26, 1971 (aged 73); Hollywood, California, United States
- Occupations: Actor, director, stunt man, filmmaker
- Years active: 1924–1963

Bartlett Carré (July 10, 1897 – April 26, 1971) was involved in the film industry during five decades, spanning both the silent and sound film eras. He spent most of that time in production capacities, either as a production supervisor or manager, associate producer, or assistant director. He appeared in numerous films, mostly in small uncredited roles, or as a stunt man, but he did have one starring role in the 1925 silent film, Flying Hoofs, and directed the 1935 film, Gun Smoke. His first participation in film was in the small role of Jake Watkins in the 1924 silent film, Behind Two Guns. He last worked in films in 1963 where he was either the associate producer or production supervisor. He was the brother-in-law of the actress, Lenore Ulric.

== Partial filmography ==
- Behind Two Guns (1924)
- Flying Hoofs (1925) - actor
- The Texas Tornado (1932) - actor
- Battling Buckaroo (1932)
- The Reckless Rider (1932)
- Lightning Range (1933)
- The Fighting Cowboy (1933)
- The Pecos Dandy (1934)
- Adventures of Texas Jack (1934)
- Five Bad Men (1935)
- Gun Smoke (1936) - director
