= Alma Rayford =

American actress

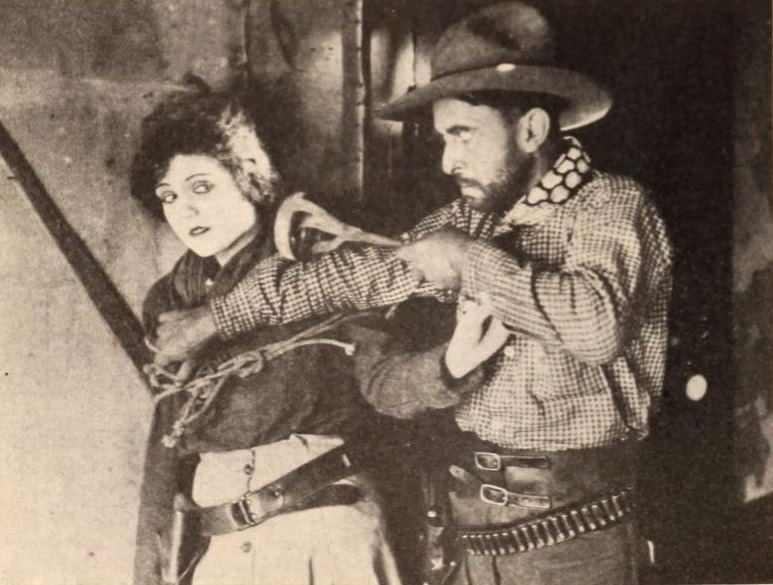
- Rayford with an unidentified actor in a scene from Hearts o' the Range (1921).
- Born: March 24, 1903; Muskogee, Oklahoma, U.S.
- Died: February 14, 1987 (aged 83); El Paso, Texas, U.S.
- Occupation: Actress
- Years active: 1921–1934 (film)

Alma Rayford (March 24, 1903 – February 14, 1987) was an American film actress of the silent era.

Rayford was born on a ranch in Oklahoma and learned to ride horses as she grew up there.

Rayford specialized in western films, appearing in 18 features and a number of two-reel films.

== Selected filmography ==
- The Passing of Wolf MacLean (1924)
- Romance of the Wasteland (1924)
- The Terror of Pueblo (1924)
- The Demon Rider (1925)
- Ace of Action (1926)
- Deuce High (1926)
- Vanishing Hoofs (1926)
- The Haunted Range (1926) a.k.a. The Haunted Ranch
- The Lost Trail (1926)
- The Phantom Buster (1927)
- Between Dangers (1927)
- The Valley of Hunted Men (1928)
- Young Whirlwind (1928)
