= Flying Hoofs =

1925 film

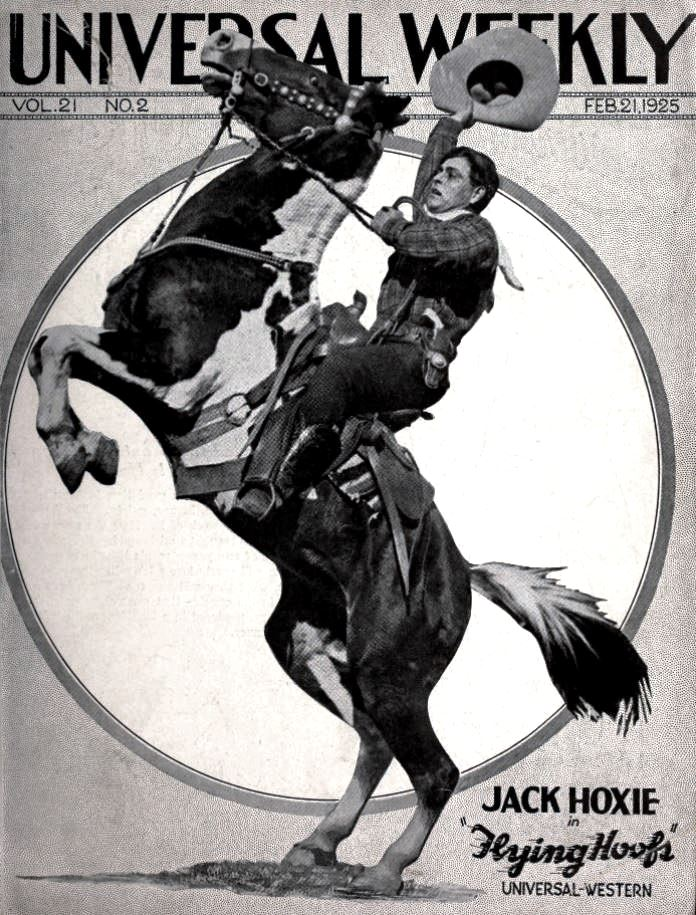
- Advertisement on magazine cover
- Directed by: Clifford S. Smith
- Story by: Clee Woods
- Starring: Jack Hoxie; Bartlett Carré; William Welsh
- Cinematography: Harry Neumann
- Production company: Universal Pictures
- Distributed by: Universal Pictures
- Release date: February 8, 1925 (US)
- Running time: 5 reels
- Country: United States
- Language: Silent (English intertitles)

Flying Hoofs is a 1925 American silent Western film, directed by Clifford S. Smith. It stars Jack Hoxie, Bartlett Carré, and William Welsh, and was released on February 8, 1925.

== Plot ==
Frank Moody is the sheriff in a small western town. The area has been plagued by a series of crimes perpetrated by a bandit called "The Raven", and his gang. Circumstantial evidence points to the sheriff's younger brother, Henry, as the bandit. Frank refuses to arrest him until Henry openly threatens the town's banker after the banker forecloses on the family ranch. This is the last straw and Frank is forced to arrest his brother. When his brother is convicted and sentenced to hang, Frank switches places with him at the last minute, his countenance hidden by the hangman's hood.

However, at the last minute the Raven's gang arrives to save him, unwilling to let an innocent man die, and it is revealed that the Raven is none other than the banker's clerk.

== Cast list ==
- Jack Hoxie as Frank Moody
- Bartlett Carré as Henry Moody
- William Welsh as Banker Conner
- J. Gordon Russell as James Perdee
- Charlotte Stevens as Emily Perdee
- Alys Murrell as Mary Conner
- Duke R. Lee as The Raven

== Reception ==
The Modesto Morning Herald gave the film a good review saying that it was "one of the best motion pictures of western life seen in a long, long time." They enjoyed the romantic and comedic elements of the picture, as well as its action. The Calgary Albertan also gave the film a positive review, especially praising Jack Hoxie for his acting and horsemanship skills. They said, "The plot of "Flying Hoofs" has more depth and power than the usual western story and is full of dramatic possibilities." The Shreveport Journal gave the film and Hoxie another good review, stating that "the big cowboy star does some of his most spectacular riding of his screen career on his beautiful horse, Scout, in the picture, which is a thrilling story of a man's devotion to duty."

== Preservation ==
A complete print of Flying Hoofs is reportedly held by a private collector.
