= The Cowboy and the Bandit =

1935 film directed by Albert Herman

- Theatrical release poster
- Directed by: Albert Herman
- Written by: Jack Jevne
- Produced by: Ralph M. Like
- Starring: Rex Lease; Bobby Nelson; Blanche Mehaffey
- Cinematography: Arthur Reed
- Edited by: Carl Himm
- Production companies: Stage and Screen Productions
- Distributed by: State Rights; Superior Talking Pictures
- Release date: November 1935 (US)
- Running time: 61 minutes
- Country: United States
- Language: English

The Cowboy and the Bandit is a 1935 American Western film directed by Albert Herman, starring Rex Lease, Bobby Nelson, and Blanche Mehaffey.

== Cast ==
- Rex Lease as Bill
- Bobby Nelson as Bobbie [Barton]
- Blanche Mehaffey (credited as Janet Morgan) as Alice
- Dick Alexander as Scarface
- Adabelle Driver as Mother Alexander Barton
- Bill Patton as Whitey
- Hal Taliaferro (credited as Wally Wales) as Chuck
- William Desmond as Sheriff
- Franklyn Farnum as Dealer
- Art Mix as Luke Short

== Reception ==
The Elizabethton Star gave the picture a good review, stating, "This new film is an extra special variety of action thrill drama for it has everything that a feature picture should have: drama, comedy and added to that stunt riding, hair trigger excitement." The felt the performances of Lease, Nelson and Desmond were excellent, and also commended the job of Nelson, Wally Wales, Mix, and Farnum, among several others in the cast. They also commended the story by Jevne. The Herald-Palladium also gave the film a good review. They called Jevne's script, "well constructed", stating that he did well to get "away from the usual trite Western themes". They complimented Herman's direction, and complimented the acting of Nelson, Potel and Morgan. They called the film, "one of the best pictures of its type that has come out of Hollywood in a long, long time." The Anniston Star gave the film a good review as well, stating that Jevne's script was a "well constructed plot".
