= The Overland Stage =

1927 film directed by Albert S. Rogell

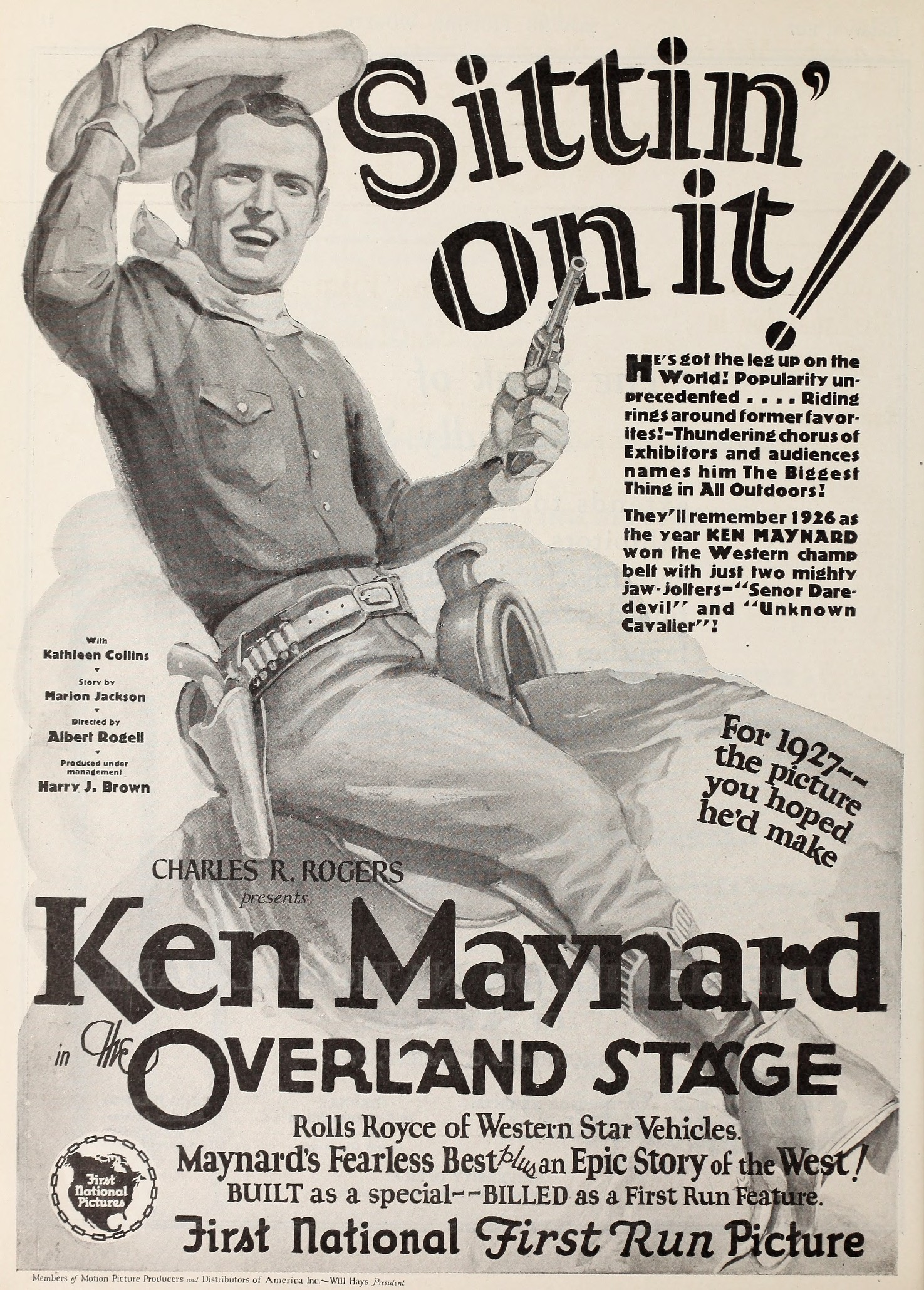
- Advertisement
- Directed by: Albert S. Rogell
- Screenplay by: Marion Jackson
- Story by: Marion Jackson
- Starring: Ken Maynard; Kathleen Collins; Tom Santschi; Sheldon Lewis; Dot Farley; Florence Turner
- Cinematography: Sol Polito
- Production company: Charles R. Rogers Productions
- Distributed by: First National Pictures
- Release date: January 31, 1927
- Running time: 70 minutes
- Country: United States
- Language: Silent (English intertitles)

The Overland Stage is a 1927 American silent Western film directed by Albert S. Rogell and written by Marion Jackson. The film stars Ken Maynard, Kathleen Collins, Tom Santschi, Sheldon Lewis, Dot Farley, and Florence Turner. The film was released on January 31, 1927, by First National Pictures.

== Cast ==
- Ken Maynard as Jack Jessup
- Kathleen Collins as Barbara Marshall
- Tom Santschi as Hawk Lespard
- Sheldon Lewis as Jules
- Dot Farley as Aunt Viney
- Florence Turner as Alice Gregg
- Jay Hunt as John Gregg
- William Malan as John Marshall
- Paul Hurst as Hell-A-Poppin' Casey
- Fred Burns as Butterfield

== Preservation ==
The Overland Stage is currently presumed lost. In February of 2021, the film was cited by the National Film Preservation Board on their Lost U.S. Silent Feature Films list.
