= Jack Jevne =

American screenwriter (1892–1972)

- Born: January 25, 1892; Provo, Utah, United States
- Died: May 25, 1972 (aged 80); Los Angeles, California, United States
- Other name: Tuthill Otto Jevne
- Occupation: Screenwriter
- Years active: 1919-1956

Jack Jevne (January 25, 1892 – May 25, 1972) was an American screenwriter. He also worked as an actor and served as sergeant first class during World War I. He wrote for 58 films between 1919 and 1956, notably working with Laurel and Hardy on several occasions. He was born in Provo, Utah, the son of Lloyd Jevne, a professional billiard player, and Anna Anderberg, a Swedish immigrant.

During the Hollywood blacklist era, Jean Rouverol Butler, wife of blacklisted screenwriter Hugo Butler, wrote Autumn Leaves (1956) with her husband based on her novella. Jack Jevne fronted for her, that is, feigned authorship.

Jevne died in Los Angeles, California.

== Selected filmography ==
- Air Raid Wardens (1943)
- Barnacle Bill (1941)
- The Housekeeper's Daughter (1939)
- Captain Fury (1939)
- Merrily We Live (1938)
- Topper (1937)
- Way Out West (1937)
- Our Relations (1936)
- The Ghost Rider (1935)
- The Cowboy and the Bandit (1935)
- Trails End (1935)
- Palooka (1934)
- I Cover the Waterfront (1933)
- Easy Millions (1933)
- Eve's Leaves (1926)
- The Jay Bird (1920)
- The Trail of the Holdup Man (1919)
- The Fighting Line (1919)
