= Daniel Boone Thru the Wilderness =

1926 film

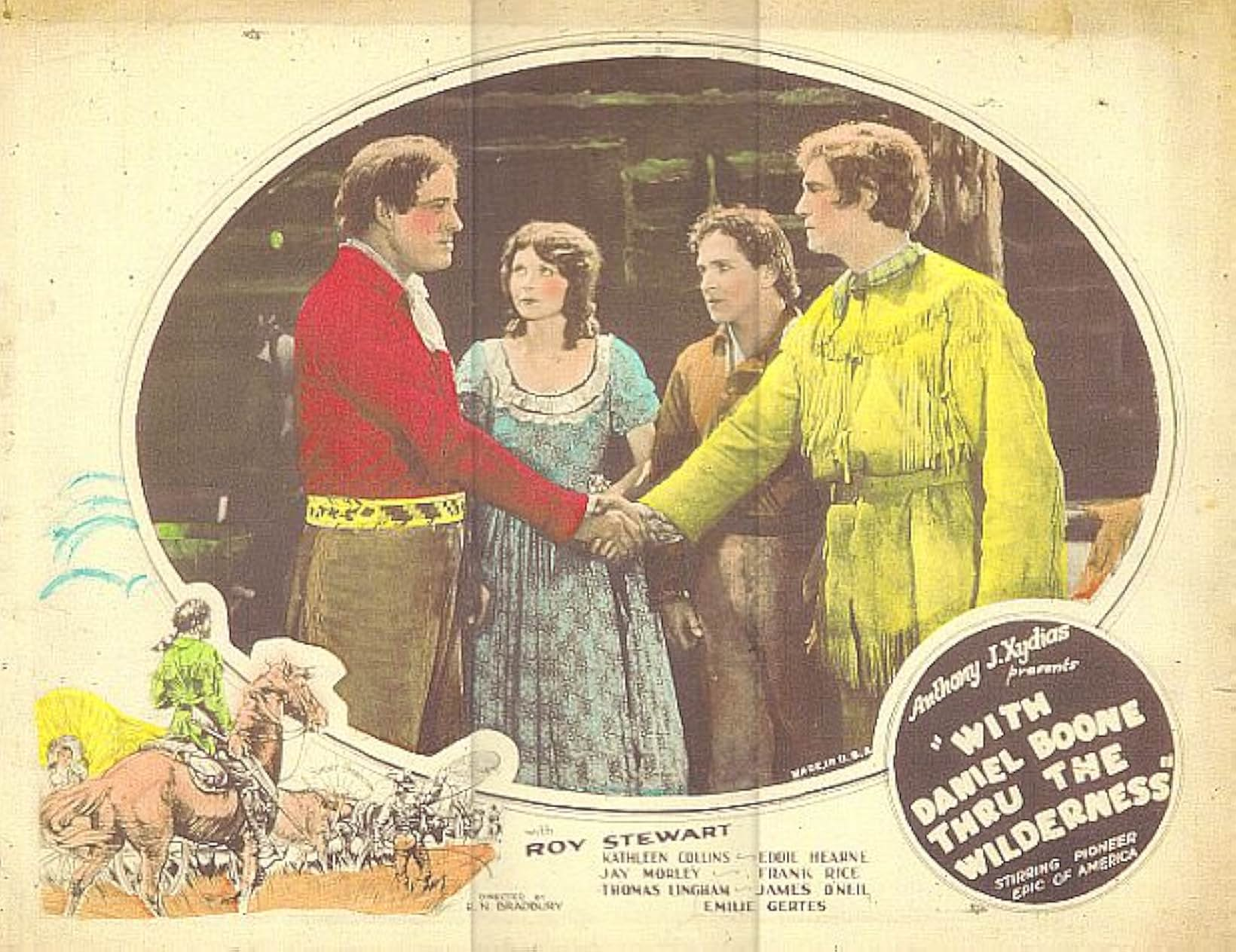
- Directed by: Robert N. Bradbury
- Written by: Frank S. Mattison; Robert N. Bradbury
- Produced by: Anthony J. Xydias
- Starring: Roy Stewart; Kathleen Collins; Edward Hearn
- Cinematography: James S. Brown Jr.
- Edited by: Della M. King
- Production company: Sunset Productions
- Distributed by: Aywon Film Corporation
- Release date: May 1, 1926
- Running time: 62 minutes
- Country: United States
- Languages: Silent (English intertitles)

Daniel Boone Thru the Wilderness is a 1926 American silent historical Western film directed by Robert N. Bradbury and starring Roy Stewart, Kathleen Collins and Edward Hearn. A print of this film exists.

== Plot ==
During the pre-revolutionary era, Daniel Boone apprehends Simon Gerty, a white renegade, but opts to release him. Upon Boone's relocation from North Carolina to settle in Kentucky, Gerty resurfaces. This time, Gerty murders the Chief's son, falsely attributing the act to a white man, inciting the Native Americans to retaliate with violence.

== Cast ==
- Roy Stewart as Daniel Boone
- Kathleen Collins as Rebe Bryan
- Edward Hearn as The Stranger
- Jay Morley as Simon Gerty
- Frank Rice as Hank Vaughan
- Thomas G. Lingham as Otis Bryan
- Jim O'Neill as Chief Grey Eagle
- Emily Gerdes as Mrs. Bryan
- Bob Steele as Jim Bryan

== Bibliography ==
- Bertil O. Österberg. Colonial America on Film and Television: A Filmography. McFarland, 2000.
