= Barry Barringer =

American screenwriter (1888–1938)

- Born: June 25, 1888; Mobile, Alabama, United States
- Died: May 21, 1938 (aged 49); Los Angeles, California, United States
- Occupations: Writer, Director
- Years active: 1922-1938 (film)

Barry Barringer (1888–1938) was an American screenwriter. He also directed three films during the silent era. He generally worked for low-budget Poverty Row companies.

== Filmography ==
- One Glorious Day (1922)
- Vengeance of the Deep (1923)
- Heads Up (1925)
- Smilin' at Trouble (1925)
- Frenzied Flames (1926)
- The Warning Signal (1926)
- Fire and Steel (1927)
- Hazardous Valley (1927)
- Duty's Reward (1927)
- Roaring Fires (1927)
- Riding to Fame (1927)
- Code of the Air (1928)
- Bye, Bye, Buddy (1929)
- Convicted (1931)
- Graft (1931)
- The Lightning Flyer (1931)
- The Face on the Barroom Floor (1932)
- Murder at Dawn (1932)
- Dynamite Denny (1932)
- The Death Kiss (1932)
- The Midnight Patrol (1932)
- Daring Daughters (1933)
- The Dude Ranger (1934)
- The Return of Chandu (1934)
- The Way of the West (1934)
- What's Your Racket? (1934)
- Sixteen Fathoms Deep (1934)
- Valley of Wanted Men (1935)
- Courage of the North (1935)
- Timber Terrors (1935)
- Northern Frontier (1935)
- Men of Action (1935)
- Red Blood of Courage (1935)
- Timber War (1935)
- Federal Agent (1936)
- Song of the Trail (1936)
- Held for Ransom (1938)

== Bibliography ==
- Michael R. Pitts. Poverty Row Studios, 1929–1940: An Illustrated History of 55 Independent Film Companies, with a Filmography for Each. McFarland & Company, 2005.
