= The Dude Ranger =

1934 film by Edward F. Cline

- Theatrical release poster
- Directed by: Edward F. Cline
- Written by: Zane Grey (novel The Dude Ranger); Barry Barringer (adaptation); Barry Barringer (screenplay)
- Produced by: Romer Grey (associate producer); Sol Lesser (producer); John Zanft (producer)
- Cinematography: Frank B. Good
- Edited by: W. Donn Hayes
- Production company: Sol Lesser Productions
- Distributed by: Fox Film
- Release date: September 21, 1934
- Running time: 65 minutes; 50 minutes (American DVD)
- Country: United States
- Language: English

The Dude Ranger is a 1934 American Western film directed by Edward F. Cline based on the 1931 novel by Zane Grey. Parts of the film were shot in Johnson Canyon, Springdale, Zion National Park, and the Virgin River in Utah. The Grand Canyon was also a filming location.

== Plot ==
An Easterner inherits some ranch property way out in 1930's Arizona. So he takes a train west. While there, he learns the historic ways of the land and its people. He becomes enamored with both. Moreover, he solves a baffling cattle-rustling mystery. This puts him in good stead with an old rancher and his beautiful daughter. In the end, he winds up with both a ranch and a wife to help him run it.

== Cast ==
- George O'Brien as Ernest "Dude" Selby
- Irene Hervey as Ann Hepburn
- LeRoy Mason as Dale Hyslip
- Syd Saylor as "Nebraska" Kemp
- Henry Hall as Sam Hepburn
- Jim Mason as "Hawk" Stevens
- Sid Jordan as Henchman Dunn
- Alma Chester as Martha (the Housekeeper)
- Lloyd Ingraham as Lawyer John Beckett
