= The Ghost Rider (1935 film) =

1935 film directed by Jack Jevne

- Theatrical release poster
- Directed by: Jack Jevne
- Written by: John West
- Produced by: Ralph M. Like
- Starring: Rex Lease; Bobby Nelson; Ann Carrol
- Cinematography: Arthur Reed; James Diamond
- Edited by: Arthur A. Brooks; Thomas Neff
- Production company: Argosy Pictures
- Distributed by: State Rights; Superior Talking Pictures
- Release date: November 1935 (US)
- Running time: 60 minutes
- Country: United States
- Language: English

The Ghost Rider is a 1935 American Western film directed by Jack Jevne, starring Rex Lease, Bobby Nelson, and Ann Carrol.

== Cast ==
- Rex Lease as Dave Danford
- Bobby Nelson as Bobby Bullard
- Ann Carrol as Linda Bullard
- Franklyn Farnum as Jim Bullard
- Lloyd Ingraham as Rufe
- Blackie Whitcomb as Bull
- Ed Parker as Wirt
- Jack Ward as Chalky
- John Alexander as Sheriff
- Edward Coxen as Dad Burns
- Lafe McKee as Jake
- Bill Patton as Max
- William Desmond as Guard
- Art Mix as Guard
