= Brydon Baker =

American cinematographer (1898–1973)

- Born: December 6, 1898; Peoria, Illinois, U.S.
- Died: February 4, 1973 (aged 74); Los Angeles, California, U.S.
- Occupation: Cinematographer
- Years active: 1929–1965 (film)

Brydon Baker (December 6, 1898 – February 4, 1973) was an American cinematographer. During the 1930s he worked on Poverty Row, generally on westerns.

== Career ==
Baker's earliest credited film in the article, the Art Mix Western Sagebrush Politics, was a low-budget production distributed by Hollywood Pictures. In some credits he appears under variant names, such as "B. B. Baker" and "Brydon B. Baker", the latter on Return of the Fly (1959).

His late-career work included television: he is credited as director of photography on the 1959 Rawhide episode "Incident at Barker Springs", under the name Brydon B. Baker, and on several other 1959–1964 television episodes.

== Selected filmography ==
- Sagebrush Politics (1929)
- Lightning Range (1933)
- The Fighting Cowboy (1933)
- The Way of the West (1934)
- Frontier Days (1934)
- Boss Cowboy (1934)
- The Pecos Dandy (1934)
- Western Racketeers (1934)
- Paradise Valley (1934)
- Timber Terrors (1935)
- Courage of the North (1935)
- The Phantom from 10,000 Leagues (1955)
- Walk the Dark Street (1956)
- Scandal Incorporated (1956)
- Wetbacks (1956)
- The Storm Rider (1957)
- Ride a Violent Mile (1957)
- Copper Sky (1957)
- Outlaw Queen (1957)
- From Hell It Came (1957)
- Escape from Red Rock (1957)
- Cattle Empire (1958)
- Space Master X-7 (1958)
- Return of the Fly (1959)
- 20,000 Eyes (1961)
- Valley of the Dragons (1961)
- Ring of Terror (1962)
- Taffy and the Jungle Hunter (1965)

== Bibliography ==
- Pitts, Michael R. Poverty Row Studios, 1929–1940: An Illustrated History of 55 Independent Film Companies, with a Filmography for Each. McFarland & Company, 2005.
