= Courage of the North =

1935 film

- Theatrical release poster
- Directed by: Robert Emmett Tansey
- Written by: Barry Barringer
- Produced by: William M. Pizor; Robert Emmett Tansey
- Starring: John Preston; William Desmond; Tom London
- Cinematography: Brydon Baker
- Edited by: Arthur Cohen
- Production company: Empire Pictures
- Distributed by: Stage & Screen Productions; First Division Pictures
- Release date: September 1935
- Running time: 54 minutes
- Country: United States
- Language: English

Courage of the North is a 1935 American Western film directed by Robert Emmett Tansey and starring John Preston, William Desmond and Tom London.

== Cast ==
- John Preston as Sergeant Bruce Morton
- William Desmond as Gene Travis
- June Love as Yvonne Travis
- Jimmy Aubrey as Constable Jimmy Downs
- Tom London as Mordant
- James Sheridan as The Hawk, Mordant Henchman
- Chief White Feather as White Feather, a Trapper
- Dynamite the Horse as Dynamite, Morton's Horse
- Captain, King of Dogs as Captain, Morton's Dog

== Bibliography ==
- Michael R. Pitts. Poverty Row Studios, 1929–1940: An Illustrated History of 55 Independent Film Companies, with a Filmography for Each. McFarland & Company, 2005.
