= With Kit Carson Over the Great Divide =

1925 film

- Directed by: Frank S. Mattison
- Written by: Frank Mattison; J.C. Hull
- Produced by: Sunset Productions; Anthony Xydias
- Starring: Roy Stewart
- Cinematography: Bert Longenecker
- Distributed by: Aywon Film Corporation
- Release date: September 3, 1925
- Running time: 62 minutes
- Country: United States
- Language: Silent...English intertitles

With Kit Carson Over the Great Divide is a lost 1925 silent historical film directed by Frank S. Mattison and starred Roy Stewart. It was produced by Anthony Xydias.

== Synopsis ==
Roy Stewart in an early cinema biography on a historical person. In this case frontiersman Kit Carson soon to be followed by bios on Buffalo Bill and George Armstrong Custer.

== Cast ==
- Roy Stewart - Seaton Maurey
- Henry B. Walthall - Dr. Samuel Webb
- Marguerite Snow - Norma Webb, wife of Samuel
- Sheldon Lewis - Flint Bastille
- Earl Metcalfe - Basil Morgan
- Charlotte Stevens - Nancy Webb
- Jack Mower - Kit Carson
- Arthur Hotaling - Lt. John C. Fremont
- Lew Meehan - Josef La Rocque
- Billy Franey - Oswald Bliffing
- Nelson McDowell - Windy Bill' Sharp
