= Cyclone Jones =

1923 film

- Directed by: Charles R. Seeling
- Written by: Jack Natteford
- Produced by: Charles R. Seeling
- Starring: Guinn 'Big Boy' Williams; Bill Patton; Kathleen Collins
- Cinematography: Marcel Le Picard
- Production company: Charles R. Seeling Productions
- Distributed by: Aywon Film Corporation
- Release date: September 1923
- Running time: 50 minutes
- Country: United States
- Languages: Silent; English intertitles

Cyclone Jones is a 1923 American silent Western film directed by Charles R. Seeling and starring Guinn 'Big Boy' Williams, Bill Patton and Kathleen Collins.

== Cast ==
- Guinn 'Big Boy' Williams as Cyclone Jones
- Bill Patton as Kirk Davis
- J.P. McKee as John Billings
- Kathleen Collins as Sylvia Billings
- Frank Alexander as Fatty Wirthing
- Fred Burns as Jack Thompson
