= With Davy Crockett at the Fall of the Alamo =

1926 film

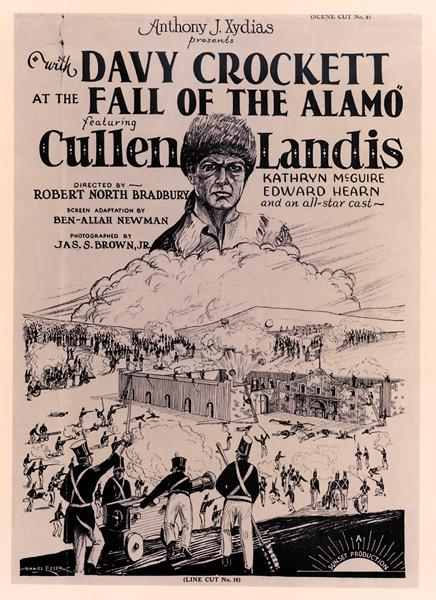
- Directed by: Robert N. Bradbury
- Written by: Ben Ali Newman; Clover Roscoe
- Produced by: Anthony J. Xydias
- Starring: Cullen Landis; Kathryn McGuire; Edward Hearn
- Cinematography: James S. Brown Jr. E.M. MacManigal
- Edited by: Della M. King
- Production company: Sunset Productions
- Distributed by: Aywon Film Corporation
- Release date: August 1, 1926 (U.S.)
- Running time: 60 minutes
- Country: United States
- Languages: Silent; English intertitles

With Davy Crockett at the Fall of the Alamo is a 1926 American silent Western film directed by Robert N. Bradbury and starring Cullen Landis, Kathryn McGuire, and Edward Hearn. The battle scenes of the silent film would be reused for the 1937 movie Heroes of the Alamo.

== Cast ==
- Cullen Landis as Davy Crockett
- Kathryn McGuire as Alice Blake
- Edward Hearn as Fred Warren
- Fletcher Norton as General Santa Anna
- Anne Berryman as Kate Kennedy
- Jay Morley as Zachary Kennedy
- Thomas G. Lingham as 'Dandy Dick' Heston
- Frank Rice as Lige Beardsley
- Betty Brown as Myra Winkler
- Bob Steele as 'Pinky' Smith
- Steve Clemente as Mose
- Joe Rickson as Colonel William B. Travis
- Bob Fleming as Jim Bowie
- Ralph McCullough as James Bonham
