= Heroes of the Alamo =

1937 film by Harry L. Fraser

- original film poster
- Directed by: Harry L. Fraser
- Written by: Roby Wentz
- Produced by: Anthony J. Xydias
- Starring: Bruce Warren; Lane Chandler; Earl Hodgins; Rex Lease; Roger Williams
- Cinematography: Robert E. Cline
- Edited by: Arthur A. Brooks
- Music by: Lee Zahler
- Distributed by: Sunset Productions; Columbia Pictures; Astor Pictures
- Release date: September 24, 1937 (U.S.)
- Running time: 75 minutes
- Country: United States
- Language: English

Heroes of the Alamo (1937) is a low-budget retelling of the events of the Texas Revolution and the Battle of the Alamo. It was produced by Anthony J. Xydias and reuses the battle scenes of his 1926 silent film Davy Crockett at the Fall of the Alamo. About 35 minutes of the latter film is available on the DVD of Heroes of the Alamo, all that remains of the silent film.

== Plot ==
Unlike other Alamo films that concentrate on Davy Crockett and Jim Bowie, the main protagonists are Almaron (Bruce Warren) and Susanna Dickinson (Ruth Findlay) and their daughter Angelina (Marilyn Haslett). The film gives a fictionalised fast moving account of the restriction on American emigration to Texas, the arrest of Stephen F. Austin by Santa Anna (Julian Rivero), Sam Houston (Edward Piel) appointed General to build the Texian Army, and Dickinson's participation in both the Battle of Gonzales and the Battle of the Alamo.

== Cast ==
- Bruce Warren as Capt. Al Dickinson
- Ruth Findlay as Anne Dickinson
- Earle Hodgins as Stephen F. Austin
- Lane Chandler as Col. Davy Crockett
- Roger Williams as Col. Jim Bowie
- Rex Lease as Col. William B. Travis
- Jack C. Smith as William H. Wharton
- Lee Valanios as Col. James Bonham
- Edward Peil Sr. as Gen. Sam Houston
- Julian Rivero as Gen. Antonio López de Santa Anna
- Willy Castello as Gen. Martín Perfecto de Cos
- Paul Ellis as Gen. Manuel Fernández Castrillón

== Release ==
After producing two 1935 Westerns, Xydias ambitiously announced the production of epic films about Buffalo Bill, Sitting Bull, George Armstrong Custer, Daniel Boone and Davy Crockett in 1937-1938 that were remakes of his Sunset Productions silent films, however only the Alamo film was made. Xydias had planned the film as a tie in with the 1936 Texas Centennial but fell behind in his plans.

Columbia Pictures acquired the film for 1938 release and changed the billing of the actors in the film.

The film featured the song The Yellow Rose of Texas being sung by the defenders though it had not been written at that time.

This was the last film Xydias produced. When World War II broke out he was in the Philippines and was interned by the Japanese.
