= Aywon Film Corporation =

American film distribution company

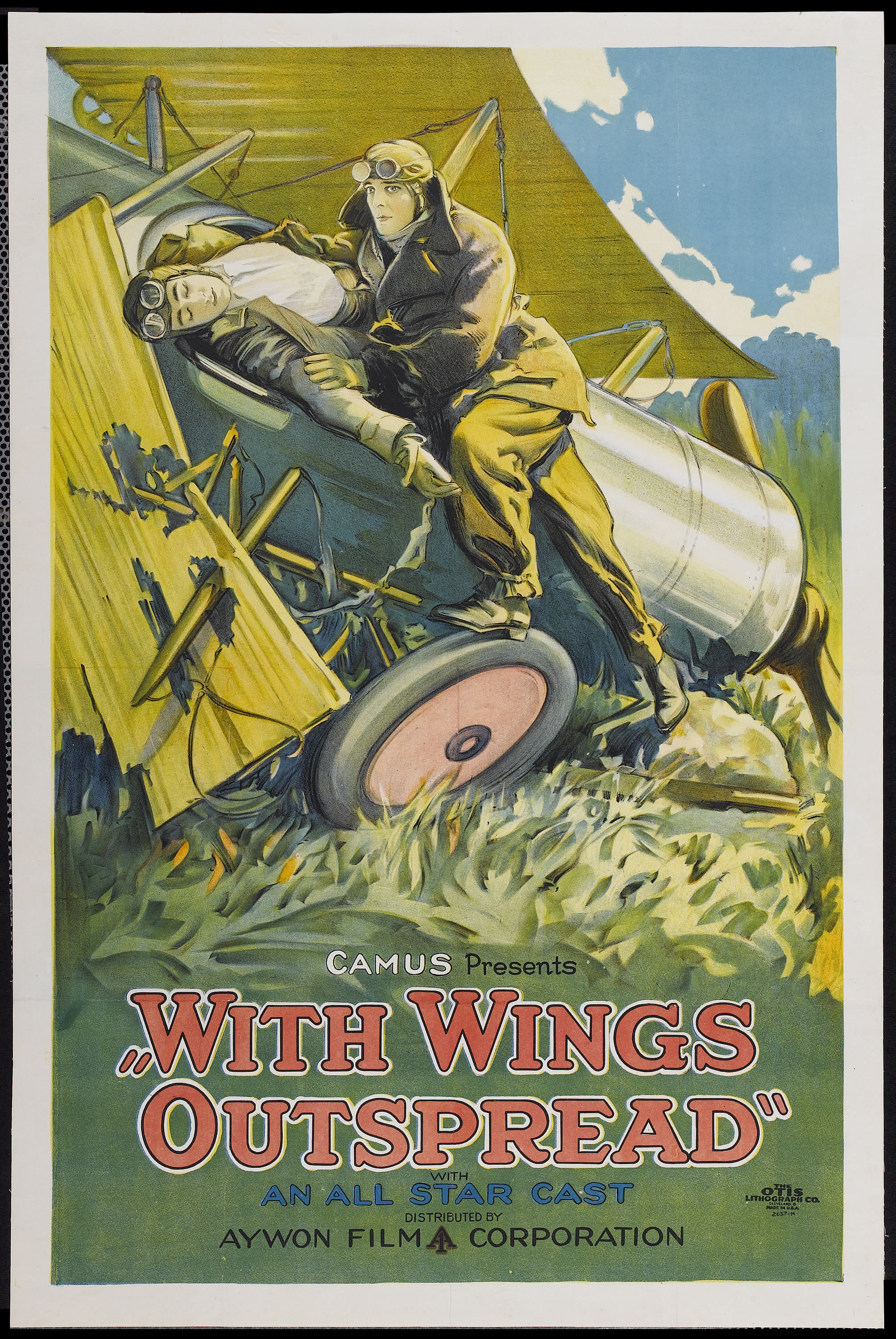
Poster for the 1922 Aywon release With Wings Outspread

Aywon Film Corporation was an American film distribution company of the silent era. Founded in New York by Nathan Hirsh it was active between 1919 and 1929. The company mainly released western and action films but also handled several foreign imports such as The Blue Danube, The Hands of Orlac, The Prude's Fall and The Pleasure Garden.

Its office was at 729 7th Avenue in New York City.

== Selected filmography ==
- The Woman Above Reproach
- The Evolution of Man
- The Woman of Mystery
- Thirty Years Between
- When Dr. Quackel Did Hide, a two reel spoof of Dr. Jekyll and Mr. Hyde
- Blind Love (1920)
- Vanishing Trails (1920)
- The Galloping Devil (1920)
- The Fighting Stranger (1921)
- The Vengeance Trail (1921)
- Across the Border (1922)
- Another Man's Boots (1922)
- Back Fire (1922)
- Barb Wire (1922)
- Boomerang Justice (1922)
- Riders of the Law (1922)
- The Cowboy King (1922)
- The Crow's Nest (1922)
- Dawn of Revenge (1922)
- The Man of Courage (1922)
- Rounding Up the Law (1922)
- With Wings Outspread (1922)
- The Grub Stake (1923)
- The Purple Dawn (1923)
- Gallopin' Through (1923)
- The Forbidden Trail (1923)
- Blood Test (1923)
- Wolf Tracks (1923)
- Desert Rider (1923)
- Cyclone Jones (1923)
- Lone Fighter (1923)
- Girl from the West (1923)
- The Apache Dancer (1923)
- Slow as Lightning (1923)
- The Tango Cavalier (1923)
- Behind Two Guns (1924)
- After a Million (1924)
- The Eagle's Claw (1924)
- Dynamite Dan (1924)
- Romance of the Wasteland (1924)
- Yankee Speed (1924)
- Ace of Cactus Range (1924)
- South of Santa Fe (1924)
- Rider of Mystery Ranch (1924)
- The Hellion (1924)
- Stop at Nothing (1924)
- Virginian Outcast (1924)
- Wanted by the Law (1924)
- The Covered Trail (1924)
- The Law and the Lady (1924)
- The Hands of Orlac (1924)
- Flyin' Thru (1925)
- With Kit Carson Over the Great Divide (1925)
- Red Blood and Blue (1925)
- The Big Stunt (1925)
- Cowboy Courage (1925)
- Anything Once (1925)
- Courage of Wolfheart (1925)
- Wolfheart's Revenge (1925)
- His Greatest Battle (1925)
- Rose of the Desert (1925)
- West of Mojave (1925)
- Ridin' Wild (1925)
- The Flying Fool (1925)
- Queen of Spades (1925)
- The Wildcat (1925)
- The Prude's Fall (1925)
- The Pleasure Garden (1925)
- The Woman Tempted (1926)
- Shadow Ranger (1926)
- The Boaster (1926)
- In Search of a Hero (1926)
- Walloping Kid (1926)
- The Blue Danube (1926)
- Pony Express Rider (1926)
- With Buffalo Bill on the U. P. Trail (1926)
- General Custer at the Little Big Horn (1926)
- Daniel Boone Thru the Wilderness (1926)
- With Davy Crockett at the Fall of the Alamo (1926)
- King of the Herd (1927)
- Twin Flappers (1927)
- Sitting Bull at the Spirit Lake Massacre (1927)
- The City Without Jews (1928)
- Shooting Stars (1928)

== Bibliography ==
- Slide, Anthony. The New Historical Dictionary of the American Film Industry. Routledge, 2014.
