= Somewhere in Sonora (1927 film) =

1927 film directed by Albert S. Rogell

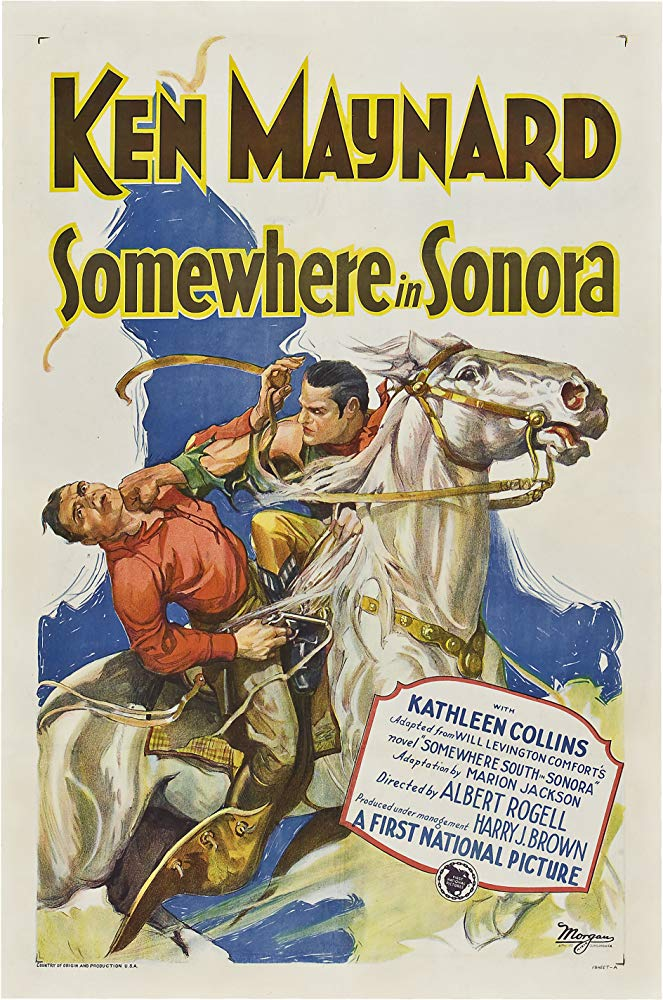
- Theatrical release poster
- Directed by: Albert S. Rogell
- Screenplay by: Marion Jackson
- Based on: Somewhere South in Sonora by Will Levington Comfort
- Produced by: Harry Joe Brown
- Starring: Ken Maynard; Kathleen Collins; Frank Leigh; Joseph Bennett; Charles Hill Mailes; Carl Stockdale
- Cinematography: Sol Polito
- Production company: Charles R. Rogers Productions
- Distributed by: First National Pictures
- Release date: April 3, 1927
- Running time: 60 minutes
- Country: United States
- Language: Silent (English intertitles)

Somewhere in Sonora is a 1927 American silent Western film directed by Albert S. Rogell and written by Marion Jackson. It is based on the 1925 novel Somewhere South in Sonora by Will Levington Comfort. The film stars Ken Maynard, Kathleen Collins, Frank Leigh, Joseph Bennett, Charles Hill Mailes and Carl Stockdale. The film was released on April 3, 1927, by First National Pictures.

== Cast ==
- Ken Maynard as Bob Bishop
- Kathleen Collins as Mary Burton
- Frank Leigh as Monte Black
- Joseph Bennett as Bart Leadley
- Charles Hill Mailes as Mexicali Burton
- Carl Stockdale as Bob Leadley
- Yvonne Howell as Patsy
- Richard Neill as Ramón Bistula
- Ben Corbett as 'Sockeye' Kelly
- Monte Montague as 'Kettle Belly' Simpson
- Tarzan as Tarzan
