= The Spell of the Circus =

1931 film

- Directed by: Robert F. Hill
- Written by: Jay McCloskey
- Produced by: Henry MacRae
- Starring: Ralph Bushman; Alberta Vaughn; Tom London
- Music by: Sam Perry
- Distributed by: Universal Pictures
- Release date: October 23, 1931
- Running time: 12 chapters (240 minutes)
- Country: United States
- Language: English

The Spell of the Circus is a 1931 American Universal 10-chapter movie serial. Francis X. Bushman Jr. played the trick horseback rider/hero Jack Grant. This is considered to be a lost film.

== Plot ==
Butte Morgan (villain) plans to take over a circus by marrying Maria Wallace, the daughter of the circus's owner. She, however, is interested only in the trick rider Jack Grant..

== Cast ==
- Francis X. Bushman Jr. (aka Ralph Bushman) as Jack Grant, the circus' cowboy rider
- Alberta Vaughn as Maria Wallace, daughter of the circus' owner
- Tom London as Butte Morgan, intends to take over the circus by marrying Maria
- Walter Shumway as George Wallace, circus owner
- Charles Murphy as Hank Harris
- Monte Montague as Totto
- Bobby Nelson as Bobby

== Chapter titles ==
1. A Menacing Monster
2. The Phantom Shadow
3. Racing with Death
4. A Scream of Terror
5. A Leap for Life
6. A Fatal Wedding
7. A Villain Unmasked
8. The Baited Trap
9. The Terror Tent
10. The Call of the Circus

_{Source:}

== See also ==
- List of film serials
- List of film serials by studio

Preceded by Battling with Buffalo Bill (1931)	Universal Serial; The Spell of the Circus (1931)	Succeeded by Detective Lloyd (1932)
