= Timber Terrors =

1935 Western film

- Directed by: Robert Emmett Tansey
- Written by: Barry Barringer; Robert Emmett Tansey
- Produced by: Robert Emmett Tansey
- Starring: John Preston; William Desmond; Tom London
- Cinematography: Brydon Baker
- Edited by: Arthur Cohen
- Production company: Empire Pictures
- Distributed by: Stage & Screen Productions
- Release date: October 1, 1935
- Running time: 59 minutes
- Country: United States
- Language: English

Timber Terrors is a 1935 Western film directed by Robert Emmett Tansey and starring John Preston, William Desmond and Tom London.

== Plot ==
Sgt. Morton and Cpl, Anderson are sent to find the murderer of another Canadian Mountie.

== Cast ==
- John Preston as Mountie Sergeant Bruce Morton
- Myrla Bratton as Mildred Boynton
- William Desmond as Royce Horter
- Tom London as Burke
- Harold Berquist as Simpson
- Fred Parker as Old Dan Parker
- James Sheridan as Billy Boynton
- Tiny Skelton as Mountie Corporal Tiny Anderson
- Dynamite the Horse as Dynamite
- Captain, King of Dogs as Captain

== Bibliography ==
- Michael R. Pitts. Poverty Row Studios, 1929–1940: An Illustrated History of 55 Independent Film Companies, with a Filmography for Each. McFarland & Company, 2005.
