= Fangs of Fate (1928 film) =

1928 film directed by Noel M. Smith

- Directed by: Noel M. Smith
- Written by: Arthur Q. Hagerman; Earl Johnson; Jack Kelly
- Produced by: Fred McConnell
- Starring: Henry Hebert; Kathleen Collins
- Cinematography: Edward Snyder
- Edited by: William Austin
- Production company: Fred J. McConnell Productions
- Distributed by: Pathé Exchange
- Release date: June 24, 1928
- Running time: 50 minutes
- Country: United States
- Languages: Silent; English intertitles

Fangs of Fate is a 1928 American silent action film directed by Noel M. Smith and starring Henry Hebert and Kathleen Collins. It was produced as a vehicle for Klondike the Dog, an imitator of Rin Tin Tin.

== Cast ==
- Klondike the Dog as Klondike
- Arnold Gray as Arnold Barcklay
- Henry Hebert as Eli Hargraves
- Robert Reault as Robert Winter
- Kathleen Collins as Dorothy Winter
- Alfred Fisher as Jed Morgan

== Preservation ==
With no holdings located in archives, Fangs of Fate is considered a lost film.

== Bibliography ==
- Munden, Kenneth White. The American Film Institute Catalog of Motion Pictures Produced in the United States, Part 1. University of California Press, 1997.
