= Roaring Fires =

1927 silent film

- Directed by: Barry Barringer
- Written by: Barry Barringer; David Walker
- Produced by: William T. Lackey
- Starring: Roy Stewart; Alice Lake; Lionel Belmore
- Cinematography: Fred Stevens
- Production company: W.T. Lackey Productions
- Distributed by: Ellbee Pictures
- Release date: July 29, 1927
- Running time: 60 minutes
- Country: United States
- Languages: Silent; English intertitles

Roaring Fires is a 1927 American silent drama film directed by Barry Barringer and starring Roy Stewart, Alice Lake and Lionel Belmore. It is now considered to be a lost film.

== Cast ==
- Roy Stewart as David Walker
- Alice Lake as Sylvia Summers
- Lionel Belmore as John D. Summers
- Bert Berkeley as Paddy Flynn
- Ray Turner as Dennison de Puyster
- Spottiswoode Aitken as Calvert Carter
- George Dunning as Tommy - the Crippled Boy
- Robert Walker
- Culvert Curtis

== Bibliography ==
- Palmer, Scott. British Film Actors' Credits, 1895-1987. McFarland, 1988.
