= General Custer at the Little Big Horn =

1926 film

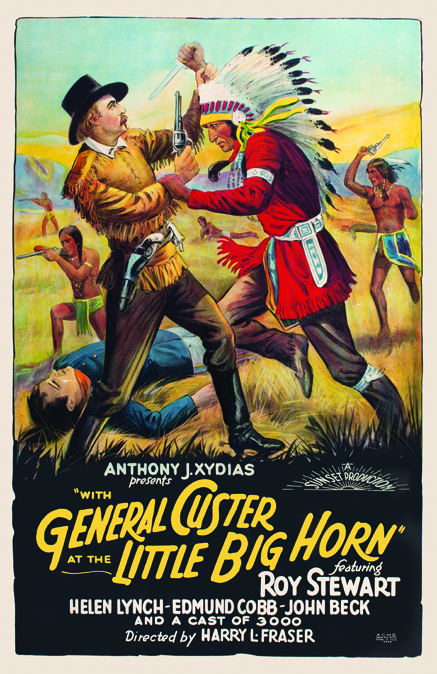
- Film poster
- Directed by: Harry L. Fraser
- Written by: Carrie E. Rawles
- Produced by: Anthony J. Xydias
- Starring: Roy Stewart
- Cinematography: L. William O'Connell
- Production company: Sunset Productions
- Distributed by: Aywon Film Corporation; Arthur Bromberg Attractions
- Release date: September 16, 1926
- Running time: 6 reels (5,094 feet)
- Country: United States
- Languages: Silent; English intertitles

General Custer at the Little Big Horn is a 1926 American silent Western film directed by Harry L. Fraser and starring Roy Stewart. It depicts the Battle of the Little Bighorn and was filmed and released for the 50th anniversary of the battle.

A print of the film is preserved in the collection of the Library of Congress.

== Cast ==
- Roy Stewart as Lem Hawks
- Helen Lynch as Betty Rossman
- John Beck as General George Armstrong Custer
- Edmund Cobb as Capt. Page
- Dick La Reno
- Norman Lindley
- Arthur Morrison
- Bert Lindley
- Running Deer as Chief Sitting Bull
- Felix Whitefeather
- Black Hawk
- Andre Farneur

== See also ==
- The Scarlet West (1925)
- They Died With Their Boots On (1941)
- Little Big Man (1970)
