= William Barrymore (film actor) =

American actor

- Born: August 17, 1899; Russian Empire
- Died: April 23, 1979 (aged 79); San Diego, California, United States
- Occupation: Actor
- Years active: 1925–1934 (film)

William Barrymore (1899–1979) was a Russian-born American film actor active in the silent and early sound era. Born as Elia Bulakh he also acted under the name Boris Bullock and Kit Carson.

== Selected filmography ==
- His Greatest Battle (1925)
- The Range Terror (1925)
- Don X (1925)
- Ridin' Wild (1925)
- Cowboy Courage (1925)
- Racing Romance (1926)
- Twin Six O'Brien (1926)
- Walloping Kid (1926)
- Prince of the Saddle (1926)
- Lawless Trails (1926)
- The Millionaire Orphan (1926)
- The Grey Vulture (1926)
- Pony Express Rider (1926)
- The Border Cavalier (1927)
- Across the Plains (1928)
- Cheyenne Trails (1928)
- Midnight on the Barbary Coast (1929)
- Forgotten Commandments (1932)
- Lightning Range (1933)
- The Fighting Cowboy (1933)
- Rawhide Romance (1934)
- The Rawhide Terror (1934)
- The Whirlwind Rider (1934)
- Two-Gun Lady (1955)

== Bibliography ==
- Katchmer, George A. A Biographical Dictionary of Silent Film Western Actors and Actresses. McFarland, 2015.
- Pitts, Michael R. Poverty Row Studios, 1929–1940: An Illustrated History of 55 Independent Film Companies, with a Filmography for Each. McFarland & Company, 2005.
