= Art Mix =

American actor (1896–1972)

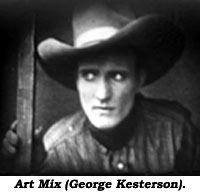
- Screen shot of Mix from the 1924 silent film, Ace of the Cactus Range.
- Born: George Washington Kesterson; June 18, 1896; Pike County, Illinois, United States
- Died: December 7, 1972 (aged 76); Riverside, California, United States
- Occupation: Actor
- Years active: 1924–46

Art Mix (born George Washington Kesterson; June 18, 1896 – December 7, 1972), was an American character actor from the 1920s until the mid-1940s.

== Biography ==
Prior to becoming an actor, Mix worked as a circus performer and a boxer. He initially appeared under his real name, Kesterson, before being given his stage name by Victor Adamson. Adamson calculated that a cowboy named "Art Mix" would be associated somehow with western superstar Tom Mix, and that small-town exhibitors who could not afford Tom Mix's expensive films would be likely to use cheaper films marketed with the lesser "Art Mix" brand name. Contract problems led Mix to leave Adamson and begin working for producer J. Charles Davis.

Art Mix appeared in over 200 film shorts and feature films. Although most of his roles were in smaller and bit parts, he would sometimes be cast in a featured role, such as in 1932's Border Devils, starring Harry Carey. He was even given an occasional leading role, as in the 1935 "B"-western, The Rawhide Terror.

Of his more than 90 feature films, some of the more notable include: Sagebrush Trail (1933), starring John Wayne; the 1939 classic Gunga Din, starring Cary Grant, Victor McLaglen, and Douglas Fairbanks Jr.; and the Academy Award-winning The Westerner, starring Gary Cooper and Walter Brennan.

In 1929, Art Mix won a lawsuit over the use of his professional name. The films' producer, Victor Adamson, tried to keep his Art Mix series going while actor Kesterson was working for producer J. Charles Davis. Adamson went before the camera himself, as Art Mix. A judge granted an injunction restraining Adamson (then using the screen name Denver Dixon) from using the name Art Mix "until one year after the release date of Kesterson's last picture of a series being made under contract with the J. Charles Davis Productions."

Mix married the Cuban American actress, Inez Gomez. He died on December 7, 1972, at the age of 76, in Riverside, California.

== Filmography ==
(Per AFI database)

- Ace of Cactus Range (1924)
- The Man From the Rio Grande (1924) (as George Kesterson)
- Romance of the Wasteland (1924)
- South of Santa Fe (1924)
- The Terror of Pueblo (1924)
- The Danger Rider (1924)
- Rider of Mystery Ranch (1924)
- Riders of Border Bay (1925)
- Roped by Radio (1925) (as George Kesterson)
- Paths of Flame (1926) (as George Kesterson)
- Salt Lake Trail (1926) (as George Kesterson)
- Shadow Ranger (1926) (as George Kesterson)
- The Wild Horse Stampede (1926) (as George Kesterson)
- Loco Luck (1927) (as George Kesterson)
- Western Courage (1927) (as George Kesterson)
- The Bronc Stomper (1928)
- The Old Oregon Trail (1928)
- Sagebrush Politics (1929)
- West of the Rockies (1929)
- The Lonesome Trail (1930)
- The Utah Kid (1930)
- Breed of the West (1930)
- Pueblo Terror (1931)
- Trapped (1931)
- Lariats and Six-Shooters (1931)
- Desert Vengeance (1931)
- Border Devils (1932)
- The Boiling Point (1932)
- Young Blood (1932)
- The Texan (1932)
- Forbidden Trail (1932)
- Law and Order (1932)
- King of the Wild Horses (1933)
- The Dude Bandit (1933)
- Sagebrush Trail (1933)
- Treason (1933)
- Kid Millions (1934)
- The Westerner (1934)
- The Way of the West (1934)
- Elinor Norton (1934)
- The Fighting Ranger (1934)
- The Rawhide Terror (1934)
- Five Bad Men (1935)
- Big Calibre (1935)
- The Ghost Rider (1935)
- The Cowboy and the Bandit (1935)
- Pals of the Range (1935)
- Cyclone of the Saddle (1935)
- Powdersmoke Range (1935)
- Swifty (1935)
- Lucky Terror (1936)
- End of the Trail (1936)
- Code of the Range (1936)
- One Man Justice (1937)
- The Old Wyoming Trail (1937)
- Two-Fisted Sheriff (1937)
- Two Gun Law (1937)
- Westbound Mail (1937)
- Dodge City Trail (1937)
- Outlaws of the Prairie (1937)
- South of Arizona (1938)
- Rio Grande (1938)
- Sergeant Murphy (1938)
- Cattle Raiders (1938)
- Call of the Rockies (1938)
- Law of the Plains (1938)
- West of Cheyenne (1938)
- The Thundering West (1939)
- Gunga Din (1939)
- Spoilers of the Range (1939)
- The Taming of the West (1939)
- Maisie (1939)
- Beyond the Sacramento (1940)
- Covered Wagon Trails (1940)
- Bad Man from Red Butte (1940)
- The Westerner (1940)
- Across the Sierras (1941)
- Hands Across the Rockies (1941)
- The Medico of Painted Springs (1941)
- North from the Lone Star (1941)
- Riding Through Nevada (1942)
- Bullets for Bandits (1942)
- Overland Stagecoach (1942)
- Shut My Big Mouth (1942)
- Sunset Serenade (1942)
- A Tornado in the Saddle (1942)
- West of Tombstone (1942)
- Hail to the Rangers (1943)
- Outlaws of Stampede Pass (1943)
- Silver City Raiders (1943)
