= South of Santa Fe (1924 film) =

1924 film directed by Denver Dixon

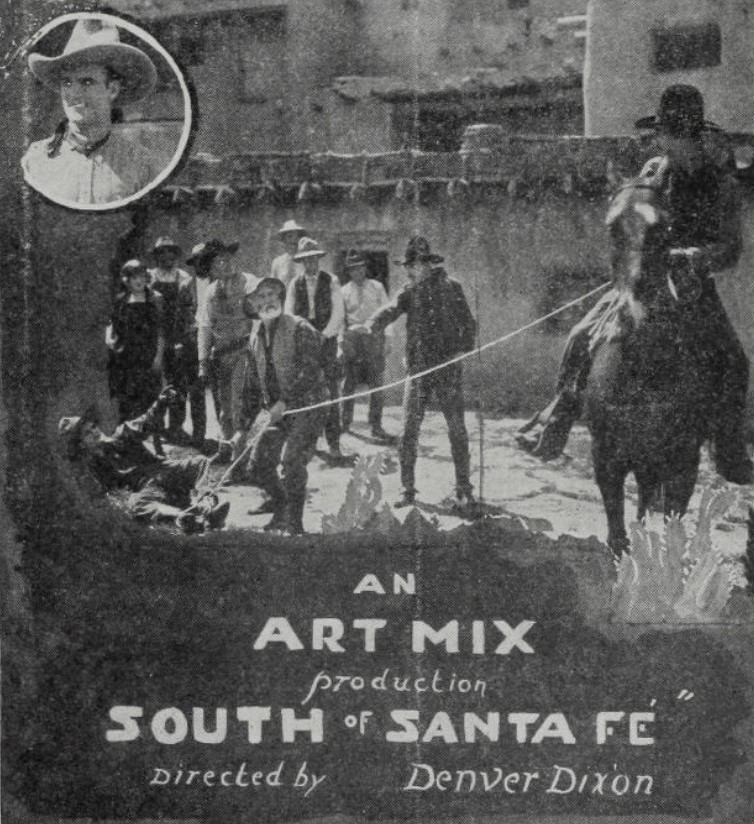
- Advertisement
- Directed by: Denver Dixon
- Produced by: Denver Dixon
- Starring: Art Mix
- Production company: Art Mix Productions
- Distributed by: Aywon Film Corporation
- Release date: July 16, 1924 (US)
- Running time: 5 reels
- Country: United States
- Language: Silent (English intertitles)

South of Santa Fe is a 1924 American silent Western film directed by Victor Adamson under the name Denver Dixon, a pseudonym he often used. A low budget film, it starred Art Mix. It premiered on July 16, 1924, in Chillicothe, Ohio.
