= Victor Adamson =

American director, actor and writer (1890–1972)

- Born: Albert Victor Adamson; January 4, 1890; Auckland, New Zealand
- Died: November 9, 1972 (aged 82); Los Angeles, California, U.S.
- Other names: Denver Dixon, A. V. Anderson, Robert Charles, Al James, Van Johnson, Art Mix
- Occupation(s): Screenwriter, film director, film producer, actor
- Years active: 1910–1970
- Children: 5, including Al Adamson

Albert Victor Adamson (January 4, 1890 – November 9, 1972) was a New Zealand director, producer, screenwriter, and actor most famous for directing and starring in very-low-budget westerns in 1920s and 1930s. Adamson often used pseudonyms to credit himself, most often using the name Denver Dixon. His son, Al Adamson, would later follow his father in producing B movies during the 1960s and 1970s.

== Biography ==
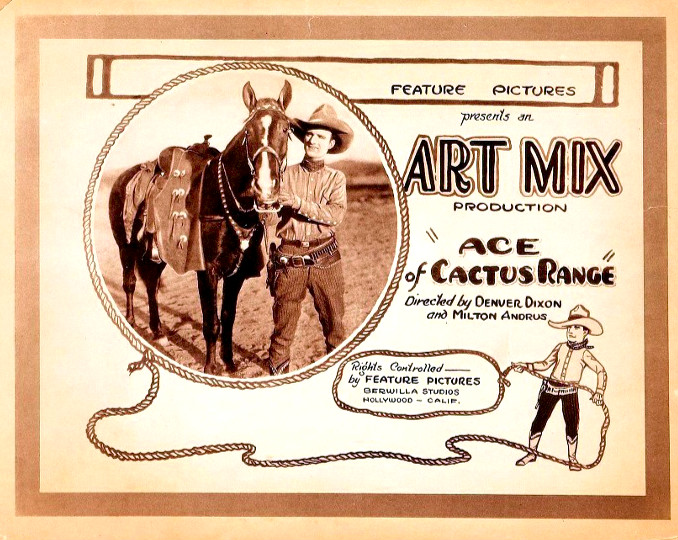
The 1924 film Ace of Cactus Range with Adamson directing as Denver Dixon and George Kesterson as Art Mix

Adamson was born January 4, 1890, in Auckland, New Zealand. In the late 1910s, he moved to the United States with a home-produced movie and found a distributor. He continued making his own movies despite a lack of early success with his films.

Adamson began producing films around 1920. He adopted the screen name Art Mix (cashing in on the name value of Fox Film's western-movie superstar Tom Mix) and called his production company Art Mix Productions. Director Richard L. Bare, who as a young man had invested in one of Adamson's productions, commented: "Fox and Mix would prevail in a court of law. So when Dixon one day got a restraining order from the Los Angeles court preventing him from using the name Art Mix, he got a little worried himself. If he dropped this name now he wouldn't stand a chance at the box office. Determined to hang on to his name, he thumbed his finger down the M pages of the Los Angeles phone book until he came to Arthur S. Mix. When Denver arrived and explained his plight to Mr. Mix, it was not long before Arthur S. Mix had become Denver Dixon's real name. Through a court of law Dixon was adopted by the man found in the telephone book. Now nobody could stop him from using the name Art Mix, although he had to pay Arthur S. Mix for the privilege of being adopted. It cost him 10 percent of his earnings for several years."

Adamson, however, gave up starring in his own films -- as Bare explained, "He had been having a problem with his new set of teeth, and sometimes they would click and move around in his mouth while the camera was turning." He hired actor George Kesterson (1896-1972) to appear in his films using the Art Mix alias. Kesterson used the name for the rest of his career.

Adamson's company, Victor Adamson Productions, built studios in Monrovia, California, in 1927. Opening and dedication ceremonies for the facilities occurred on July 17, 1927.

With the advent of talking pictures, his silent-film studio was no longer technically comparable to Hollywood's new soundstages. Adamson forged ahead anyway, filming and recording most of the action outdoors to avoid building sets. He produced a series of grade-Z westerns featuring silent-film cowboy stars Buffalo Bill, Jr., Wally Wales and Buddy Roosevelt. Many of these films were released by Superior Talking Pictures, a small independent distributor. Adamson's productions were so threadbare that he filmed them in ramshackle California ghost towns on budgets of $1,000 or less. Scenes were always shot in one take as confirmed by Bare, regardless of technical errors or actors' mistakes, and even the titles were hand-drawn in a hurry: the Buffalo Bill, Jr. film Lightning Bill was spelled Lighting Bill on the title card.

Sometimes Adamson couldn't find a distributor that would accept his films. He would then take his show on the road, according to Bare: "Denver's scheme was to get some cash out of the budget, make a picture that he knew probably would never be released, then load up his Lincoln with the film and some posters and head for the midwest. He always hit every small-town theater that he could book, where he sells himself, Art Mix, as a rope act, tossing in the picture as a bonus. The personal appearance gambit was Denver Dixon's ace-up-the-sleeve all along, and I learned that he had done this whenever he made an unreleaseable film, which was more often than not."

In 1936 Adamson attempted to turn a young stuntman, Wally West, into a star using the name Tom Wynn. Adamson himself co-starred in the resulting film, Desert Mesa, using the pseudonym Art James. He was not able to find many companies willing to buy the film due to its poor quality. Adamson would star in one additional film after Desert Mesa, 1938's Mormon Conquest.

Following Mormon Conquest Adamson appeared in many films, mostly Westerns and mostly in bit parts, through the late 1930s and 1940s. Often credited as "Denver Dixon", he appeared in approximately 130 films during this period. In 1952 he appeared as a barfly in an uncredited role in Bend in the River starring Jimmy Stewart. After a career hiatus, he briefly returned to filmmaking when he co-produced two films with his son Al Adamson, Half Way to Hell (1960) and Two Tickets to Terror (1963). These films inspired the younger Adamson to produce B movies of his own, which he did from the 1960s through the early 1980s.

== Death ==
Victor Adamson died of a heart attack on November 9, 1972, in Los Angeles, aged 82.
