= The Devil's Trail =

The Devil's Trail may refer to:

- The Devil's Trail (1919 film), an American silent drama film
- The Devil's Trail (1942 film), an American Western film
