= Bulldog Courage =

Bulldog Courage may refer to:

- Bulldog Courage (1922 film), a silent Western film starring George Larkin and Bessie Love
- Bulldog Courage (1935 film), a Western film starring Tim McCoy
- Bulldog Courage, a hardcore band from Albany, New York
