= Dearie (film) =

1927 film

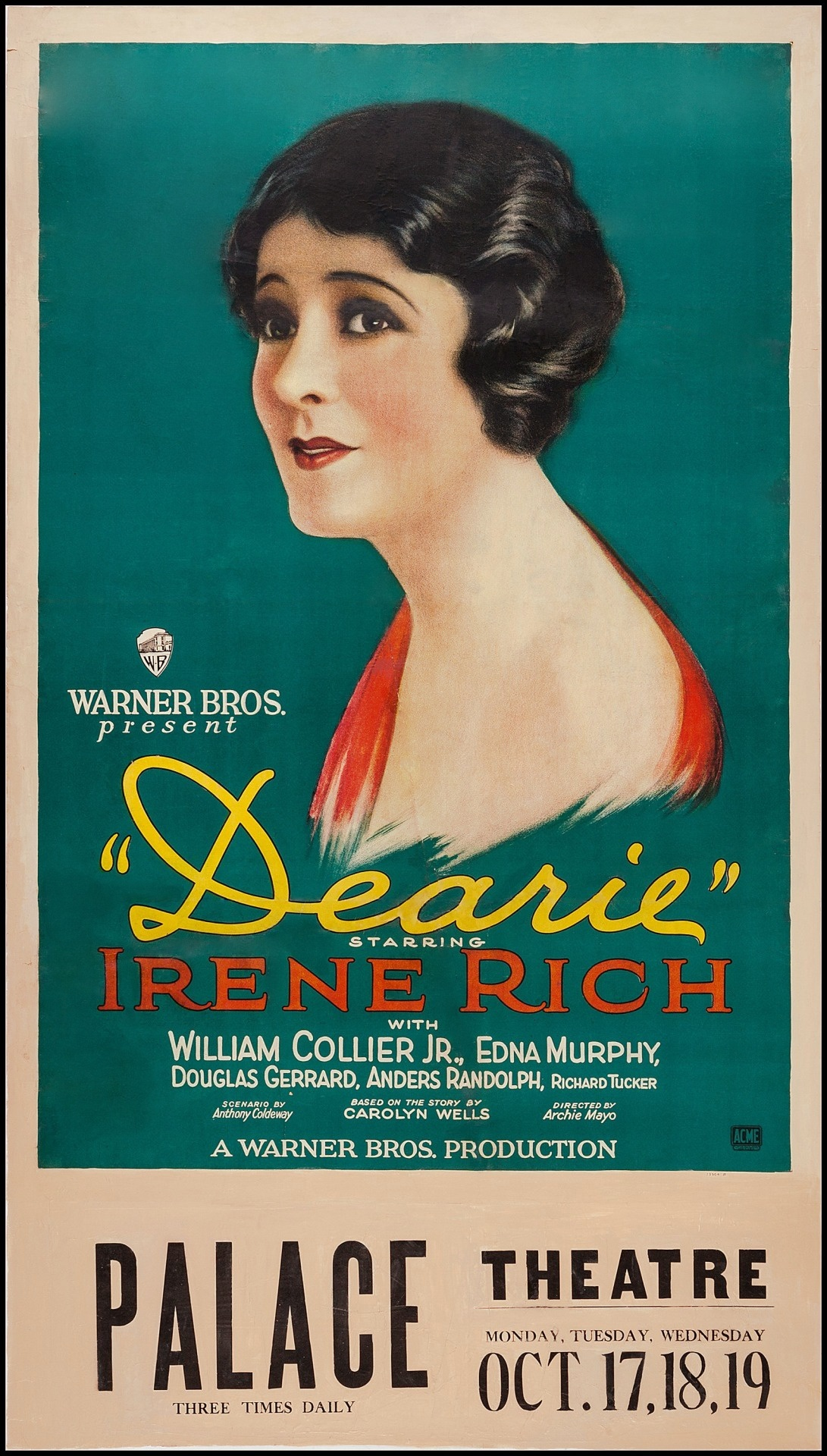
- Lobby poster
- Directed by: Archie Mayo
- Written by: Anthony Coldeway (scenario); Jack Jarmuth (intertitles)
- Story by: Carolyn Wells
- Starring: Irene Rich
- Cinematography: David Abel
- Production company: Warner Bros.
- Distributed by: Warner Bros.
- Release date: June 18, 1927
- Running time: 60 minutes (6 reels)
- Country: United States
- Language: Silent (English intertitles)

Dearie is a 1927 American silent drama film produced and distributed by Warner Bros. and directed by Archie Mayo. It is from a story by Victorian author Carolyn Wells about a woman who sacrifices for her ungrateful son. This film starred Irene Rich and it is possible that the film may have been released with a Vitaphone soundtrack.

== Plot ==
The film is told in flashback, as the repentant Stephen unfolds his life story to wealthy publisher Samuel Manley.

Finding herself in dire circumstances, the widowed Sylvia Darling determines that her son, Stephen, will complete his college education and develop his supposed literary talents; thus, she accepts a contract as singer in a Broadway nightclub, billed as "Dearie," and becomes an immediate sensation. Samuel Manley, a wealthy publisher who is attracted to Sylvia, allows her to entertain in his home, escorted by Luigi, the club proprietor. At college, Stephen and his self-styled roommates, Paul and Max, are expelled. He romances Edna, the publisher's niece, who promises to promote his book with her uncle. Unimpressed by the egotistical youth, Manley rejects his work. Enraged, Stephen accidentally wounds his mother. When he learns that she is a cabaret entertainer, the ungrateful boy grows to despise his mother, doing everything he can to humiliate her. Only when tragedy looms over the horizon does Stephen comes to his senses, and he begs his mother for forgiveness and is forgiven. Sylvia eventually marries Luigi.

== Cast ==
- Irene Rich as Sylvia Darling/Dearie
- William Collier Jr. as Stephen, her son
- Edna Murphy as Ethel Jordan
- Anders Randolf as Samuel Manley
- Richard Tucker as Luigi
- Arthur Rankin as Paul
- David Mir as Max
- Douglas Gerrard as Manley's friend
- Violet Palmer as Sylvia's maid

== Preservation ==
With no prints of Dearie located in any film archives, it is a lost film.

== See also ==
- List of early Warner Bros. sound and talking features
