= Stop at Nothing =

Stop at Nothing may refer to:

- Stop at Nothing (album), a 2003 album by Dying Fetus
- Stop at Nothing (1924 film), an American silent drama film
- Stop at Nothing (1991 film), a television film
