= Ollie Kirkby =

American actress

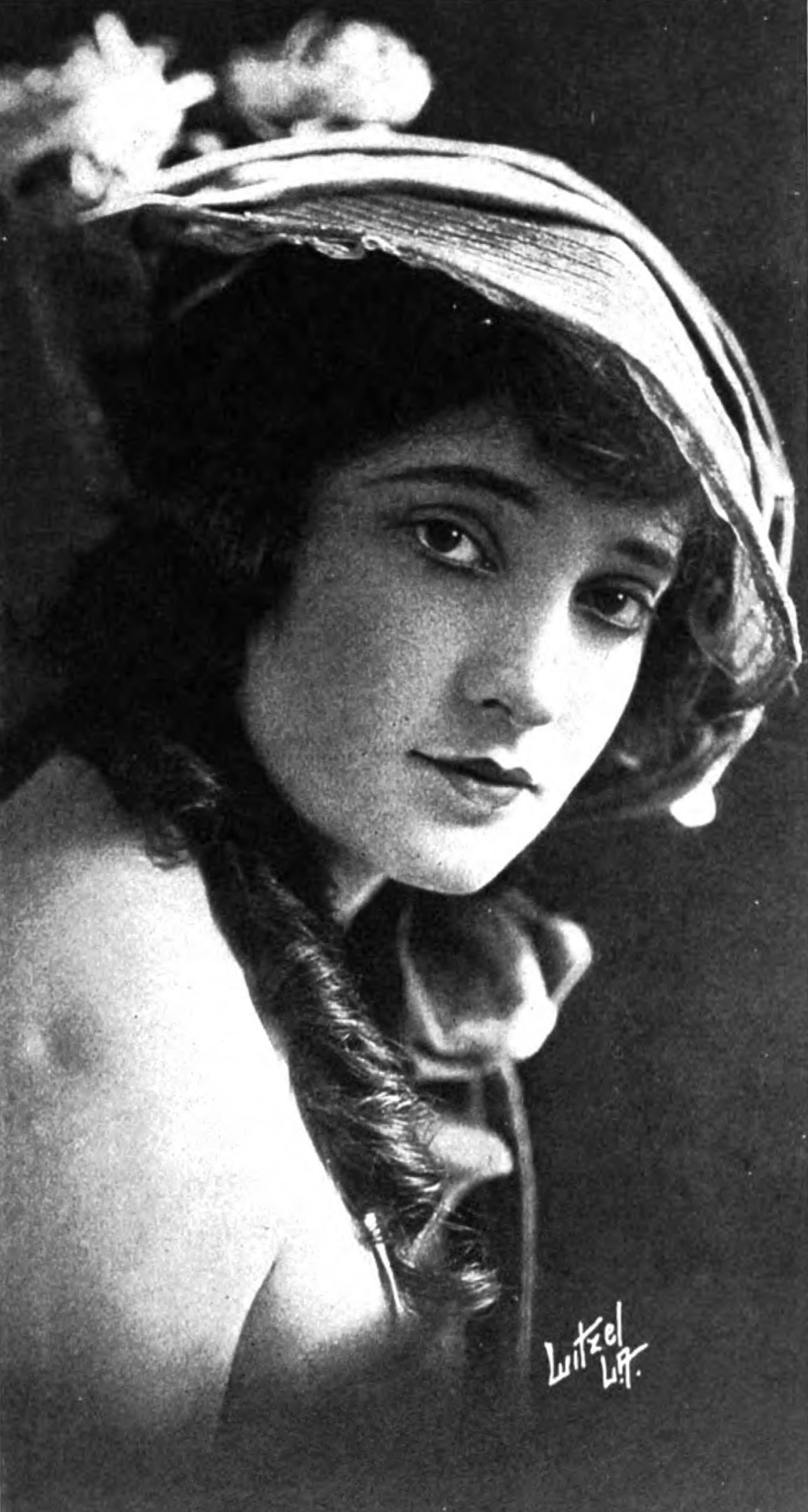
- Motion Picture Magazine, 1915
- Born: Olive Kirby; September 26, 1886; Philadelphia, Pennsylvania, U.S.
- Died: October 7, 1964 (age 78); Glendale, California, U.S.
- Other names: Ollie Kirby; Olive Kirby
- Occupation: Actress
- Years active: 1914–1926
- Spouse: George Larkin

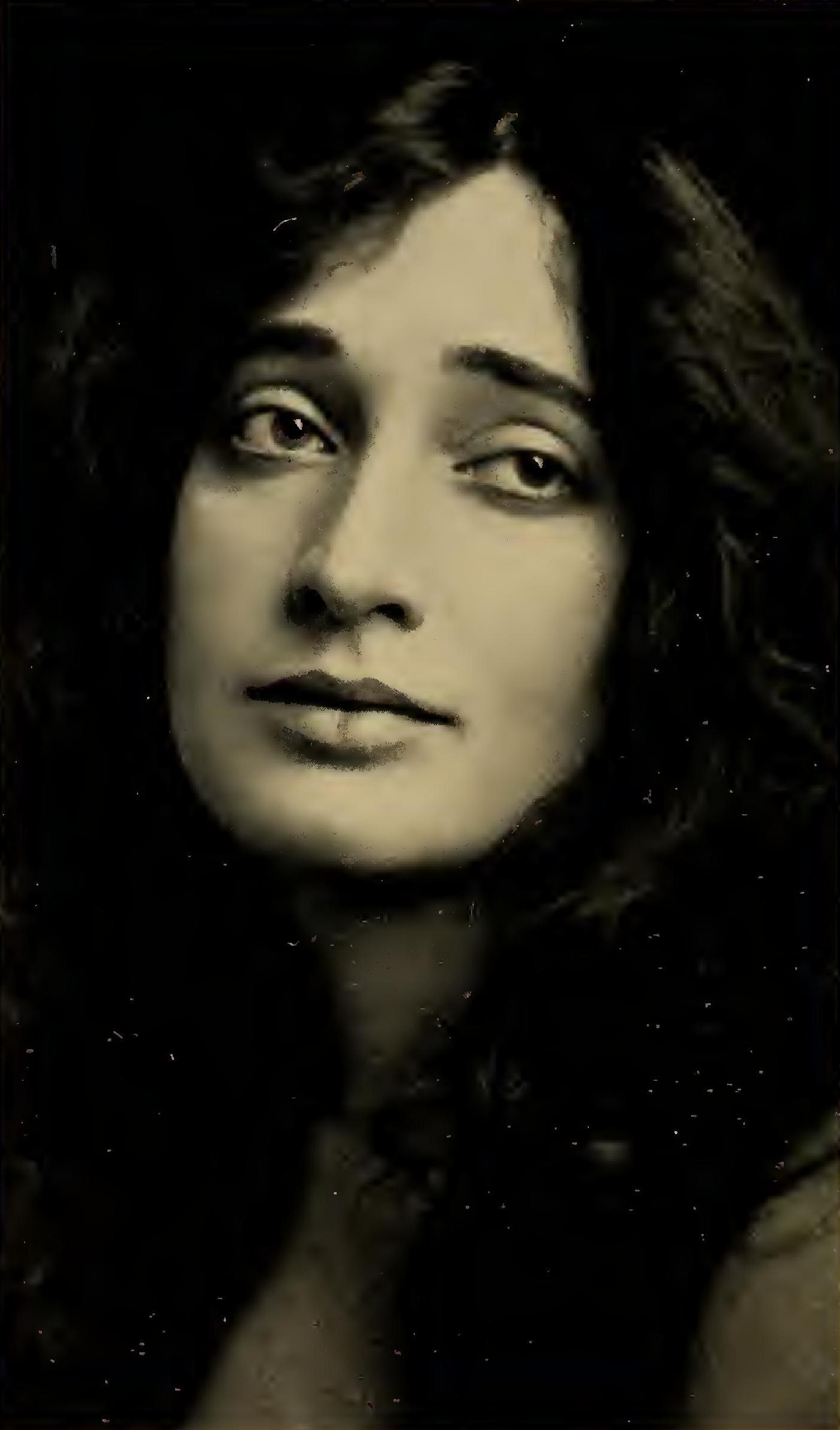
Ollie Kirkby in 1916

Ollie Kirkby (September 26, 1886 – October 7, 1964) (sometimes spelled Kirby) was an American stage, screen, and vaudeville actress.

== Biography ==
She was born in Philadelphia, Pennsylvania, in 1886 and died in 1964 at Glendale, California. Her entire career, from 1914 to 1925, was dedicated to making short films or film serials. She was known for the dimple on her shoulder and often photographed showing that distinguishing feature. Kirkby began working in films with Kalem in 1912. After two years there, she worked for Favorite Players Company for a year and then returned to Kalem.

She married actor George Larkin in 1918. He died in 1946.

In addition to her acting career, she also wrote scripts with her husband, including Bulldog Courage (1922) and The Pell Street Mystery (1924). She had a sister, Nona Thomas, who was also a silent film actor with producer and director Thomas Ince.

== Selected filmography ==
- The Parasite (1912)
- The Girl and the Gangster (1913) – short
- The Wiles of a Siren (1914) – short
- The Potter and the Clay (1914) – short
- The Key to Yesterday (1914)
- The Last Chapter (1914)
- The Girl Detective (1915) – episodes 16 & 17
- The Trap Door (1915) – short
- The Voice from the Taxi (1915) – short
- The Tattooed Hand (1915) – short
- The Clairvoyant Swindlers (1915) – short
- Scotty Weed's Alibi (1915) – short
- The Closed Door (1915) – short
- The Figure in Black (1915) – short
- The Money Leeches (1915) – short
- The Vanishing Vases (1915) – short
- The Accomplice (1915) – short
- The Frame-Up (1915) – short
- The Straight and Narrow Path (1915) – short
- The Strangler's Cord (1915) – short
- Mysteries of the Grand Hotel (1915) – short
- The Disappearing Necklace (1915) – short
- The Secret Code (1915) – short
- The Riddle of the Rings (1915) – short
- The Substituted Jewel (1915) – short
- The Barnstormers (1915) – short
- The False Clue (1915) – short
- The Wolf's Prey (1915) – short
- The Man on Watch (1915) – short
- The Man in Irons (1915) – short
- Stingaree (1915)
- The Social Pirates (1916)
- Black Magic (1916) – short
- The Code Letter (1916) – short
- The Missing Heiress (1916) – short
- The Pencil Clue (1916) – short
- Grant, Police Reporter (1916) – short
- The Man from Yukon (1916) – short
- The Rogue's Pawn (1916) – short
- The House of Three Deuces (1916) – short
- The Tango Cavalier (1923)
- The Apache Dancer (1923) as Babette
- Stop at Nothing (1924 film) as Slick Sadie alias Ted Norton
- Deeds of Daring (1924)
- Yankee Madness (1924)
- The Right Man (1925)
- Getting 'Em Right (1925)
- Never Too Late (1925)
