= The Man Trackers =

1921 film

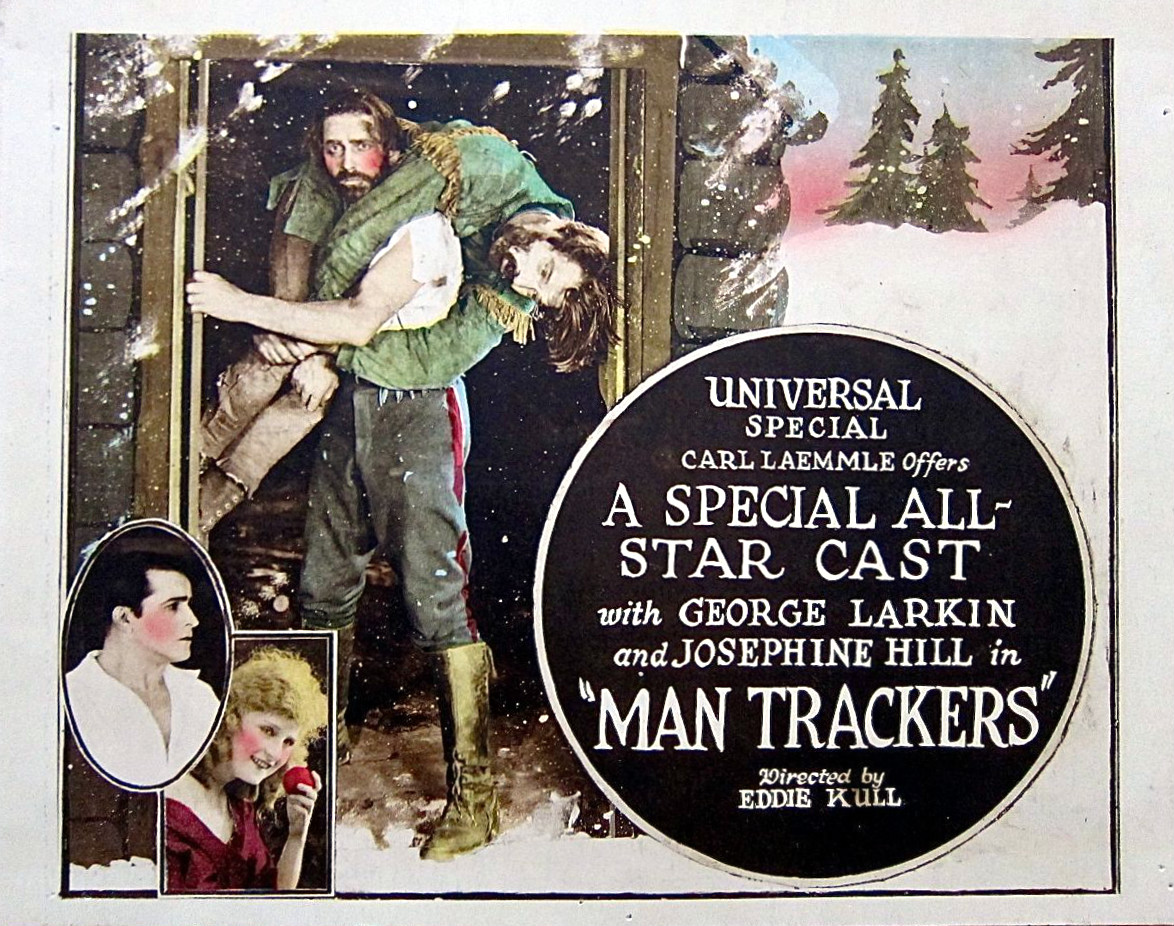
- Directed by: Edward A. Kull
- Written by: George H. Plympton; Edward A. Kull
- Produced by: Carl Laemmle
- Starring: George Larkin; Josephine Hill; Albert J. Smith
- Cinematography: Joseph Kull
- Production company: Universal Pictures
- Distributed by: Universal Pictures
- Release date: July 1921
- Running time: 50 minutes
- Country: United States
- Languages: Silent; English intertitles

The Man Trackers is a 1921 American silent Western film directed by Edward A. Kull and starring George Larkin, Josephine Hill and Albert J. Smith.

== Cast ==
- George Larkin as Jimmy Hearn
- Josephine Hill as Molly Killbride
- Albert J. Smith as Hanley
- Barney Furey as Jules
- Ruth Royce as Lizette
- Harold Holland as Inspector
- Ralph McCullough as Morgan

== Bibliography ==
- Connelly, Robert B. The Silents: Silent Feature Films, 1910-36, Volume 40, Issue 2. December Press, 1998.
- Munden, Kenneth White. The American Film Institute Catalog of Motion Pictures Produced in the United States, Part 1. University of California Press, 1997.
