= Wolf's Clothing (1927 film) =

1927 film

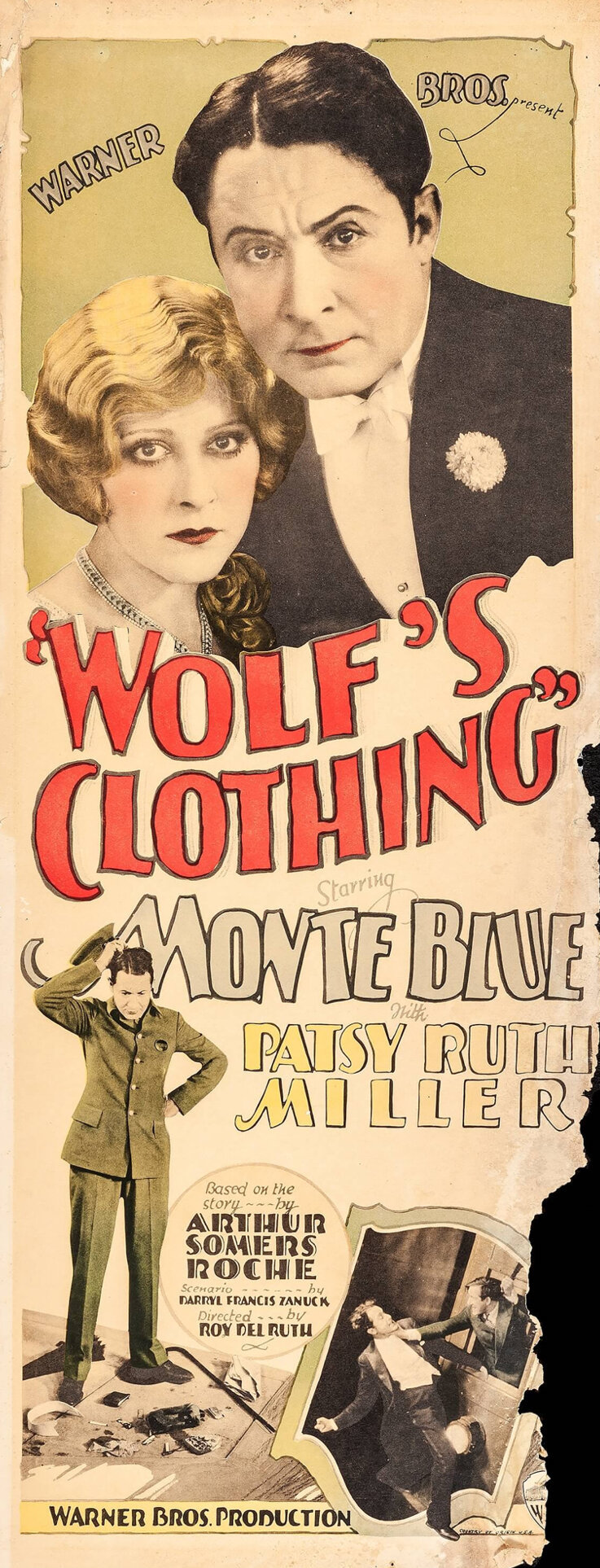
- Poster for the film
- Directed by: Roy Del Ruth
- Screenplay by: Darryl F. Zanuck
- Based on: Wolf's Clothing by Arthur Somers Roche
- Starring: Monte Blue; Patsy Ruth Miller; John Miljan; Douglas Gerrard; Lew Harvey; Ethan Laidlaw
- Cinematography: Byron Haskin
- Production company: Warner Bros.
- Distributed by: Warner Bros.
- Release date: January 15, 1927
- Running time: 80 minutes
- Country: United States
- Language: English

Wolf's Clothing is a 1927 American comedy film directed by Roy Del Ruth and written by Darryl F. Zanuck. The film stars Monte Blue, Patsy Ruth Miller, John Miljan, Douglas Gerrard, Lew Harvey and Ethan Laidlaw. The film was released by Warner Bros. on January 15, 1927.

== Cast ==
- Monte Blue as Barry Baline
- Patsy Ruth Miller as Minnie Humphrey
- John Miljan as Johnson Craigie
- Douglas Gerrard as Herbert Candish
- Lew Harvey as Vanelli
- Ethan Laidlaw as Vanelli's Pal
- J.C. Fowler as Hotel Manager
- Walter Rodgers as Hotel Doctor
- Arthur Millett as Hotel Detective
- John Webb Dillion as Crook 'Doctor'
- Lee Moran as Millionaire
- Paul Panzer as Tough
- Charles Haefeli as Tough
- Jack Cooper as Tough
- Kalla Pasha as Ship Captain
- Jack Curtis as Sailor
- Eddie Sturgis as Sailor

== Preservation status ==
The film is lost.
