= Boomerang Justice =

1922 film directed by Edward Sedgwick

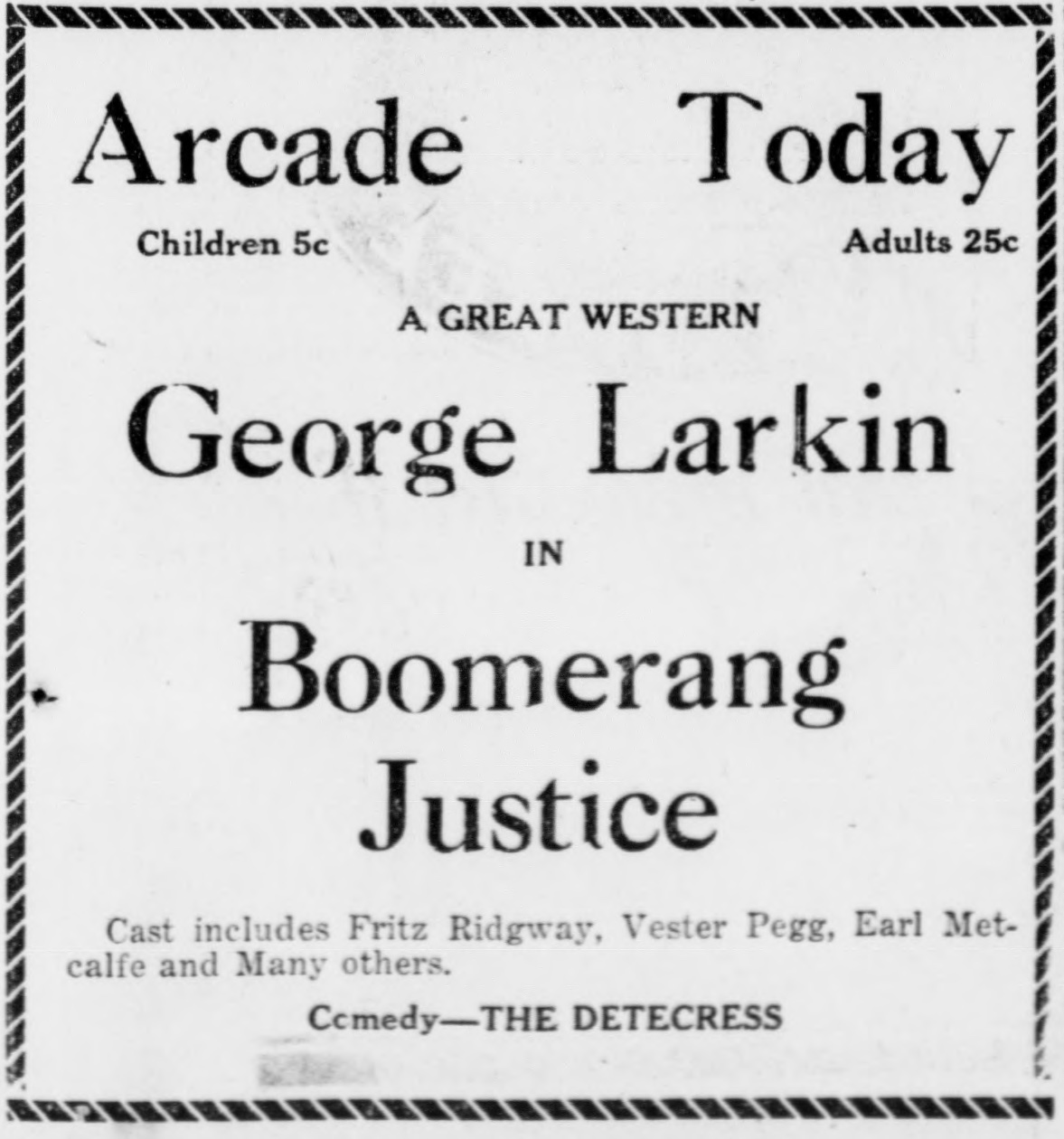
- Advertisement
- Directed by: Edward Sedgwick
- Starring: George Larkin; Fritzi Ridgeway; Al Ferguson
- Production company: Russell Productions
- Distributed by: Aywon Film Corporation
- Release date: September 1922
- Running time: 50 minutes
- Country: United States
- Languages: Silent; English intertitles

Boomerang Justice is a 1922 American silent Western film directed by Edward Sedgwick and starring George Larkin, Fritzi Ridgeway and Al Ferguson. The film is considered to be lost.

== Plot ==
According to the AFI website, the plot was the following: "Kit Carson Boone takes a job at the Randolph's ranch and finds that Nate Stinson is scheming to take away the property, with the help of his friend Maxwell, since he knows it is rich in oil. Kit saves Ruth Randolph, the owner's daughter, from abduction by Stinson, uncovers the scheme and is invited to settle on the ranch."

== Cast ==
- George Larkin as Kit Carson Boone
- Fritzi Ridgeway as Ruth Randolph
- Al Ferguson as Nate Stinson
- Earl Metcalfe as Maxwell
- Virginia Warwick
- Karl Silvera
- Vester Pegg
- Tom London
- Bud Osborne
