= The Potter and the Clay =

1914 film

- Directed by: George Melford
- Story by: Mrs. Owen Bronson
- Starring: Douglas Gerrard: Bertram Trent – a Man of Wealth; Ollie Kirke (Ollie Kirkby): Elsie Trent, Bertram's Wife; Cleo Ridgeley (Cleo Ridgely): Dorothy Trent, the Daughter; Marin Sais: Rose Masters; Elsie Maison: Lillian Masters, Rose's Daughter; Thomas G. Lingham: Gates, a Gambler; Jane Wolfe: Undetermined Role
- Color process: Black and white
- Production company: Kalem Company
- Distributed by: General Film Company
- Release date: September 21, 1914
- Running time: 20 minutes (2 reels)
- Country: United States
- Language: Silent (English intertitles)

The Potter and the Clay is a 1914 American silent short film directed by George Melford.

== Cast ==
- Douglas Gerrard as Bertram Trent – a Man of Wealth
- Ollie Kirkby as Elsie Trent, Bertram's Wife
- Cleo Ridgely as Dorothy Trent, the Daughter
- Marin Sais as Rose Masters
- Elsie Maison as Lillian Masters, Rose's Daughter
- Thomas G. Lingham as Gates, a Gambler
- Jane Wolfe

== Production ==
The film was produced by Kalem Company.

== Release ==
The film was distributed by General Film Company, and was released in American cinemas on September 21, 1914.
