= Frank Whitson =

American actor

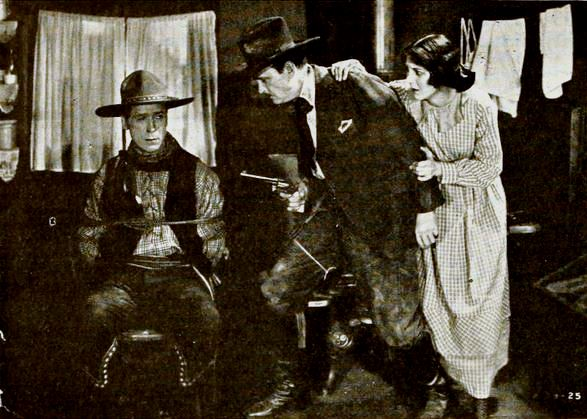
- Whitson (middle) with William S. Hart and Ann Little in Square Deal Sanderson, 1919
- Born: March 22, 1877; New York, New York, US
- Died: March 19, 1946 (aged 68); Los Angeles, California, US
- Years active: 1915-1937

Frank Whitson (March 22, 1877 – March 19, 1946) was an American film actor. He appeared in more than 60 films between 1915 and 1937. He was born in New York, New York, and died in Los Angeles, California.

Whitson performed in vaudeville and in stock theater before he began working in films.

== Selected filmography ==
- The House with Nobody in It (1915)
- Gold and the Woman (1916)
- The Mark of Cain (1916)
- If My Country Should Call (1916)
- The Morals of Hilda (1916)
- The Price of Silence (1916)
- The Clock (1917)
- Social Briars (1918)
- Boston Blackie's Little Pal (1918)
- A Trick of Fate (1919)
- The Son-of-a-Gun (1919)
- 3 Gold Coins (1920)
- The Adventures of Tarzan (1921)
- Gilded Lies (1921)
- Headin' West (1922)
- The Man from Hell's River (1922)
- Fortune's Mask (1922)
- The Tango Cavalier (1923)
- The Bolted Door (1923)
- $50,000 Reward (1924)
- Racing for Life (1924)
- The White Panther (1924)
- Her Man (1924)
- Ten Scars Make a Man (1924)
- The Pell Street Mystery (1924)
- Bad Man's Bluff (1926)
- Walloping Kid (1926)
- Hidden Aces (1927)
- The Texas Tornado (1928)
