= The Bolted Door =

1923 American film by William Worthington

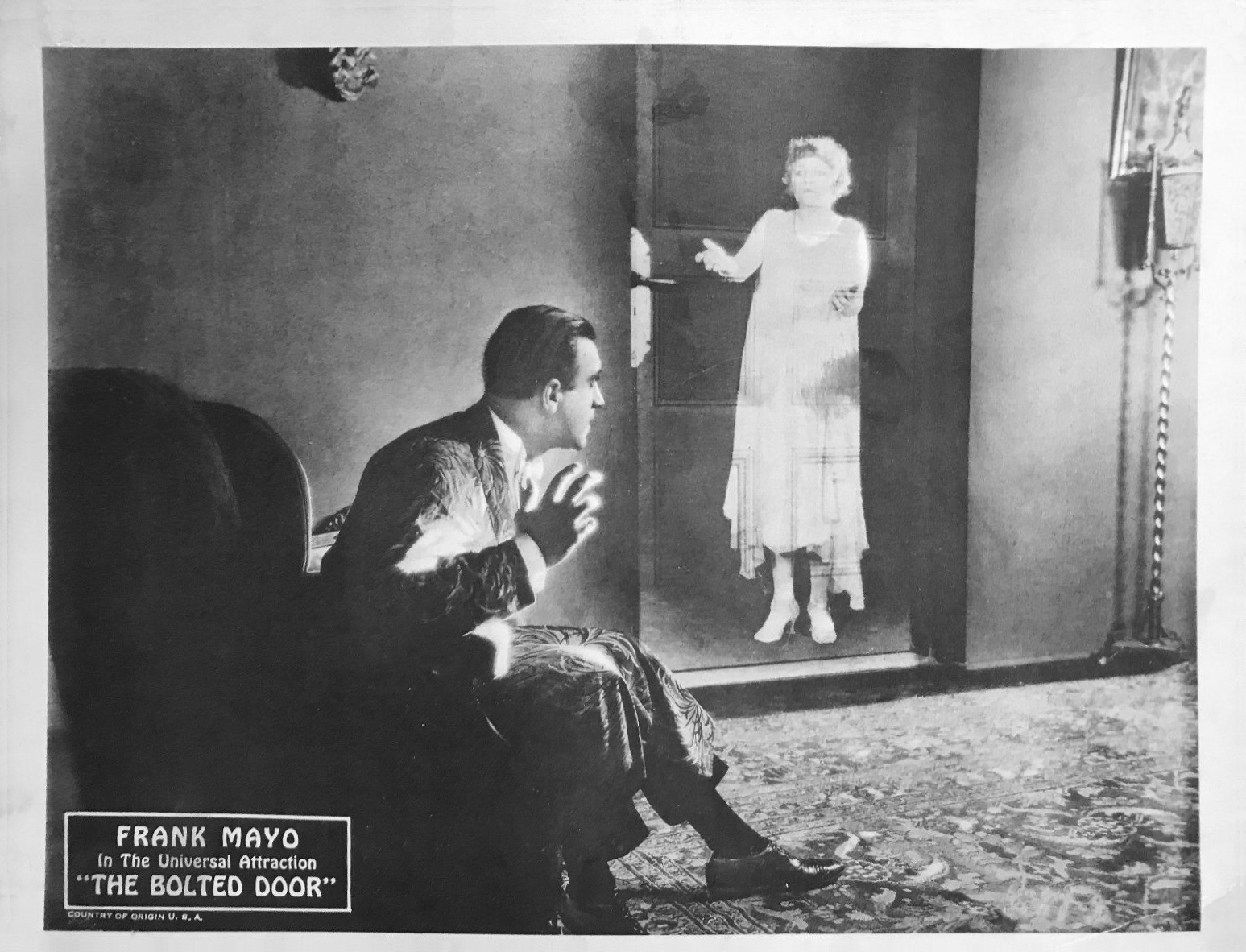
- Lobby card
- Directed by: William Worthington
- Screenplay by: George Randolph Chester
- Based on: The Bolted Door by George Gibbs
- Starring: Frank Mayo; Charles A. Stevenson; Phyllis Haver; Nigel Barrie; Kathleen Kirkham; Frank Whitson
- Cinematography: Benjamin H. Kline
- Production company: Universal Pictures
- Distributed by: Universal Pictures
- Release date: March 5, 1923
- Running time: 50 minutes
- Country: United States
- Language: English

The Bolted Door is a 1923 American drama film directed by William Worthington and written by George Randolph Chester. It is based on the 1910 novel The Bolted Door by George Gibbs. The film stars Frank Mayo, Charles A. Stevenson, Phyllis Haver, Nigel Barrie, Kathleen Kirkham, and Frank Whitson. The film was released on March 5, 1923, by Universal Pictures.

== Cast ==
- Frank Mayo as Brooke Garriott
- Charles A. Stevenson as Oliver Judson
- Phyllis Haver as Natalie Judson
- Nigel Barrie as Rene Deland
- Kathleen Kirkham as Natalie's Chum
- Frank Whitson as Attorney Bronson
- Bertram Anderson-Smith as Attorney Rowe
- Calvert Carter as Butler
