= Never Too Late (1925 film) =

1925 film directed by Forrest Sheldon

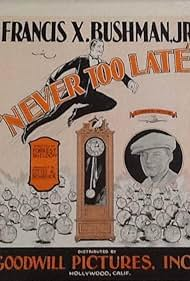
- Directed by: Forrest Sheldon
- Written by: Samuel M. Pyke
- Produced by: Otto K. Schreier
- Starring: Francis X. Bushman Jr. Gino Corrado; Ollie Kirby
- Cinematography: Frank Cotner
- Edited by: M.P. Schreck
- Production company: Otto K. Schreier Productions
- Distributed by: Goodwill Productions
- Release date: November 12, 1925
- Running time: 50 minutes
- Country: United States
- Languages: Silent; English intertitles

Never Too Late is a 1925 American silent comedy action film directed by Forrest Sheldon and starring Francis X. Bushman Jr., Gino Corrado and Ollie Kirby.

== Plot summary ==
A smuggler kidnaps a woman. She is rescued from a torture den.

== Cast ==
- Francis X. Bushman Jr. as Johnny Adams
- Harriet Loweree as Helen Bentley
- Gino Corrado as Count Gaston La Rue
- Ollie Kirby as Mabel Greystone
- Charles Belcher as Arthur Greystone
- Roy Laidlaw as Robert Leland
- Lorimer Johnston as John Kemp

== Bibliography ==
- Connelly, Robert B. The Silents: Silent Feature Films, 1910-36, Volume 40, Issue 2. December Press, 1998.
- Munden, Kenneth White. The American Film Institute Catalog of Motion Pictures Produced in the United States, Part 1. University of California Press, 1997.
