= The Pell Street Mystery =

1924 film

- Directed by: Joseph Franz
- Written by: Robert J. Horner
- Produced by: Robert J. Horner
- Starring: George Larkin; Frank Whitson; Ollie Kirby
- Production company: Robert J. Horner Productions
- Distributed by: Rayart Pictures
- Release date: November 1, 1924
- Running time: 5 reels
- Country: United States
- Language: Silent (English intertitles)

The Pell Street Mystery is a 1924 American silent action film directed by Joseph Franz and starring George Larkin, Frank Whitson, and Ollie Kirby. It is part of a series of films featuring Larkin as a New York City newspaper reporter.

== Plot ==
As described in a film magazine, the police find Queenie Ross murdered. Tip O’Neil, a newspaper reporter, is detailed to solve the mystery. He finds a cuff link on the body and recollects returning a similar one to Count Verdaux, a gang leader. Dressed as a tango dancer, he gives an exhibition with Mazie, the Count's sweetheart. The gang is wise to Tip and goes for him. The lights go out and Tip escapes. He learns his sweetheart turned off the lights. Nell is brought to Ah Foo's rooms by a trick. Tip learns of her captivity goes to get her and a fight follows. The police arrive and the murderer confesses. Tip gets another scoop for his newspaper.

== Cast ==
- George Larkin as Tip O’Neil
- Frank Whitson
- Ollie Kirby as Mazie Barnett
- Jack Richardson as Count Verdaux
- Karl Silvera

== Bibliography ==
- Langman, Larry. The Media in the Movies: A Catalog of American Journalism Films, 1900-1996. McFarland & Company, 1998.
