= Getting 'Em Right =

1925 film

- Directed by: Jack Harvey
- Starring: George Larkin, Jane Thomas, and Ollie Kirkby
- Distributed by: Rayart Pictures
- Release dates: June 8, 1925; October 18, 1926 (UK)
- Running time: 56 minutes
- Country: USA
- Language: Silent

Getting 'Em Right is a 1925 American silent action film, directed by Jack Harvey. It stars George Larkin, Jane Thomas, and Ollie Kirkby.
