= The Tango Cavalier =

1923 film

- Directed by: Charles R. Seeling
- Starring: George Larkin; Frank Whitson; Ollie Kirkby
- Production company: Charles R. Seeling Productions
- Distributed by: Aywon Film Corporation
- Release date: September 1923
- Running time: 50 minutes
- Country: United States
- Languages: Silent; English intertitles

The Tango Cavalier is a 1923 American silent Western film directed by Charles R. Seeling and starring George Larkin, Frank Whitson and Ollie Kirkby.

== Plot ==
U.S. Secret Service agent Don Lawson goes on an undercover assignment as Don Armingo in a Mexican smuggling ring. Before he can make arrests, his love interest Doris is kidnapped, and Don is captured. Carmelita, a tango dancer enamored of Don, releases and tries to seduce him, but he rebuffs her. Don rescues Doris by picking her out of an automobile in an airplane as it crashes off an embankment.

== Cast ==
- George Larkin as Don Armingo
- Frank Whitson as Colonel Pomeroy
- Dorris Dare as Doris
- Ollie Kirkby as Carmelita
- William Quinn as Brute Morgan
- Mike Tellegen as Strongarm

== Bibliography ==
- Robert B. Connelly. The Silents: Silent Feature Films, 1910-36, Volume 40, Issue 2. December Press, 1998.
