= Nitta-Jo =

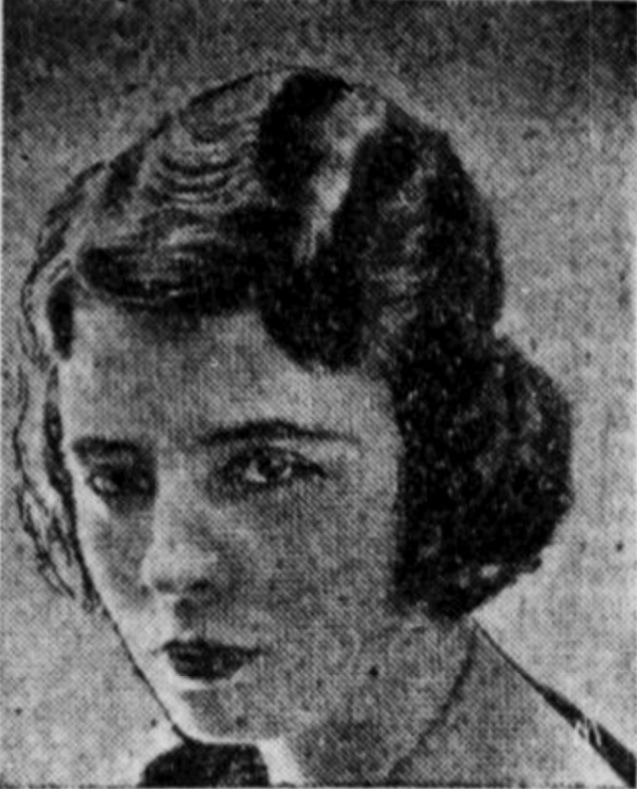
Nitta-Jo in 1926

Nitta-Jo was the stage name for French singer and performer Fanny Dafflon born in Paris on October 7, 1880. She was also known as Fanny Durnell (spouse name), and mistakenly named Jeanne Daflon or Jeanne Dufflin in various publications.

== Personal life ==
She was the daughter of a Swiss accountant and a French dressmaker. It was said that she made her stage debut at the age of 9, but another account states that as a child from Montmartre "she used to deliver hats from a shop on the Rue de la Paix on her bicycle[,] and when she grew up she became a salesgirl. ...A well known singing teacher became interested in her voice and gave her lessons and, in due course of time, she became a concert singer."

She was married in 1913 in Romania to Charles Elwood Durnell, nicknamed "Boots", a noted American horse owner and trainer who was in charge of the racing stables of the Romanian politician Alexandru Marghiloman. The couple lived in Romania until the country entered the Great War, then they relocated to Russia, where Durnell also raced horses.

They had one son, Bertrand Charles Durnell, born on September 4, 1918, in New York shortly after they arrived in the United States. Charles E. Durnell died February 16, 1949, in Arcadia, California.

Nitta-Jo was the godmother of the son of French composer Mimi Recagno. She died after 1946.

== Professional life ==
Nitta-Jo, 1918 or before

She performed as a gigolette and was known in French as La Gigolette Parisienne.

=== In Romania and Russia ===
In Romania, Nitta Jo was said to have made herself "a national heroine" with her jibes against government policies.

She rebuffed a government order to cease singing the French national song, La Marseillaise, while she was living there in 1916 because it was a violation of the nation's neutrality during wartime. "Did that gag Nitta Jo?" asked foreign correspondent Robert Mountsier in a column. "It did not. She immediately began singing a song, each verse of which set forth to the enjoyment of her audience the weak spots in Roumanian neutrality." Each verse ended with the words, sung to several bars of the French song, "La Marseillaise est défendue" (the Marseillaise is defended).

She left Romania during the war to go to Russia, "until the chaotic conditions there made any form of amusement impossible", according to an article in The Buffalo Enquirer, which continued: "The reign of terror of the Bolsheviks forced her after witnessing innumerable uprisings and massacres to escape through Siberia to Japan[,] where she sailed to America."

In Russia, she and her husband were "confined to their apartments for eight days during the revolutionary fighting", the Nevada Reno Evening Gazette reported after an interview. They arrived in the United States via Manchuria, Japan, Victoria (British Columbia) and San Francisco where they stayed at the Palace Hotel.

=== In North America ===
Her first North American tour began in September 1918 at the Princess Theatre in Montreal, where she sang two weeks. In October she moved on to New York City, with debuts at the Riverside and at The Palace theaters where she was said to be "a real 'find' for vaudeville." She also appeared in Buffalo; the Evening News said she "has created a furore and has been acclaimed the greatest artiste imported in years", and in Rochester. She ended the 1919 tour in Washington D.C.

In April 1920, she sang at the Orpheum Theater in San Francisco, and the next month she was at the Orpheum in Los Angeles. Argonaut critic Josephine Hart Phelps said of her: "She fairly flashed temperament, and her whole being became a happy exuberance of rhythm." She and her husband were said to "have a beautiful home in France, to which they will return at the close of Nita-Jo's present engagement."

Her tracks on stage are lost after a tour in La Ciotat in November 1938. In April 1939, she joined the Automobile-Club de Nice.

== Discography ==
76 recordings are known to date.

- 1910 (Pathé, Paris): Ah ! Mireille !, La Toquette, Ça sent toujours l’amour, Napolinette, Tire, tire, Ninette, La Bouss-Bouss-Mée, Marche d’amour, Grain de beauté, Vien a qui, Amour napolitain, Zyrka.
- 1912 (Pathé, Paris): Fioretta d’amore, La Tour pointue, Fille d’Espagne, You-You sous les bambous, Au chant des binious, Le Jeune Homme du métro. Released by Pathé Records in the United States: Grain de beauté/Vien a qui (October 1916).
- 1914 (Polyphon, released in Bucharest): Tire tire Ninette/Le Téléphone des anges, Comme une cigarette/Une Petite Promenade.
- 1921 (Odeon, Barcelona): Mon homme/Les Baisers.
- 1930 (Columbia, Paris): Ta voix/Sainte Catherine de Paris.
- 1931 (Columbia, Paris): Tango des roses/Un rien !, Les Gueuses/Casablanca, paradis d’Afrique, La Fortune/Quand une femme dit : non !.
- 1932 (Columbia, Paris): Les Gosses à personne/La Folle, Cocaïne/Du feu, Etre adoré de toi/Fleur de joie, Señorita/Belle Gitane.
- 1933 (Columbia, Paris): Sous l’ombrelle/Aime-moi, C’est vous que j’aime/Ton regard, Roule/Mais non !, Fumée d’amour/Si tu me veux, L’Etudiant passe/Malgré toi.
- 1934 (Columbia, Paris): T’avoir à moi/Un homme qui passe, Caïn/Mon beau matelot.
- 1935 (Columbia, Paris): Un air de tango/Chico, L’Horizon du cœur/C’est ton ombre, Munchita/La Fille du mal, Sahara/Ecoute l’amour, La Course folle/Un tout petit pied, Valsons, mon amour/L’Oiseau de nuit. Unreleased: L’Amour est une chanson.
- 1936 (Columbia, Paris): Dis-moi que tu m’aimes/Je veux un p’tit homme, J’ai soif/Soirs de Grenade, Du vent dans les voiles/Mesdam’s répondez oui, Dans le caboulot/Sorcière. Unreleased: Les Hommes, Maison close.

== Filmography ==
- Amorezati (The Lovers, 1915), with Georges Milton. Silent sketch comedy shot and released in Romania.
- Cendrillon de Paris (1930), as Madame Marthe (la diseuse). Sung in the film: Ta voix and Sainte Catherine de Paris.
- The Fortune (La Fortune, 1931), as herself on stage. Sung in the film: Les Gueuses and La Fortune.
- Toine (1932), as Maud Florens (singer and love interest). Sung in the film: Aime-moi and Du feu.

A character named "Nita Jo" is played by Ollie Kirby in the 1923 silent drama film The Apache Dancer.
