= The Purple Dawn =

1923 silent film by Charles R. Seeling

- Directed by: Charles R. Seeling
- Written by: Charles R. Seeling
- Produced by: Charles R. Seeling
- Starring: Bessie Love; Bert Sprotte; William E. Aldrich
- Cinematography: Raymond Walker; Vernon L. Walker
- Distributed by: Aywon Film Corporation
- Release date: May 10, 1923 (U.S.)
- Running time: 5 reels
- Country: United States
- Language: Silent (English intertitles)

The Purple Dawn (Note: All contemporaneous reviews and advertising for the film include "The" in the title.) is a 1923 American silent romantic drama film that was produced, written, and directed by Charles R. Seeling. It stars Bessie Love, Bert Sprotte, and William E. Aldrich.

The film is presumed lost.

== Plot ==
In San Francisco's Chinatown, Mui Far (Love), a Chinese American girl, falls in love with a young white sailor (Aldrich), who is robbed when he attempts to deliver a package of opium. The sailor meets a white girl in the country, and falls in love with her. The original owners of the opium think that the sailor stole the opium, and kidnap him and his new sweetheart. Mui Far is heartbroken, but rescues the sailor and his new sweetheart. She then commits suicide by walking into San Francisco Bay at dawn.

== Cast ==
- Bessie Love as Mui Far
- Bert Sprotte as "Red" Carson, the sea captain and dope smuggler
- Edward Peil, Sr. as Wong Chong, the Tong leader (Note: Called "Wong Chang" by some sources.)
- William E. Aldrich as Bob, the hero
- James B. Leong as Quan Foo
- J.P. Ogden
- William Horne as Mr. Ketchell
- Priscilla Bonner as Ruth Ketchell, Bob's sweetheart
- Edwin Zunn

== Production ==
Per the film's title, the final 100 feet of film were tinted light purple for dramatic effect.

== Reception ==
The film received good reviews, although the scene where the hero receives a beating was deemed "far too brutal to please the eye." Bessie Love's performance received positive reviews.

== See also ==
- Examples of yellowface
- Racism in early American film
- Whitewashing in film
