= Charles R. Seeling =

American film director

- Born: April 4, 1895; New Jersey, U.S.
- Died: October 13, 1951 (aged 56); Pasadena, California, U.S.
- Occupations: Director, cinematographer, producer
- Years active: 1915–1925

Charles R. Seeling (April 4, 1895 – October 13, 1951) was an American cinematographer and producer and film director of the silent era.

== Selected filmography ==
- A Tuner of Notes (1917)
- The Enchanted Barn (1919)
- The Wishing Ring Man (1919)
- Across the Border (1922)
- The Cowboy King (1922)
- Cyclone Jones (1923)
- The Tango Cavalier (1923)
- The Apache Dancer (1923)
- The Purple Dawn (1923)
- Yankee Madness (1924)
- Stop at Nothing (1924)
- Rose of the Desert (1925)

== Bibliography ==
- Golden, Eve. John Gilbert: The Last of the Silent Film Stars. University Press of Kentucky, 2013.
