= Yankee Madness =

1924 film

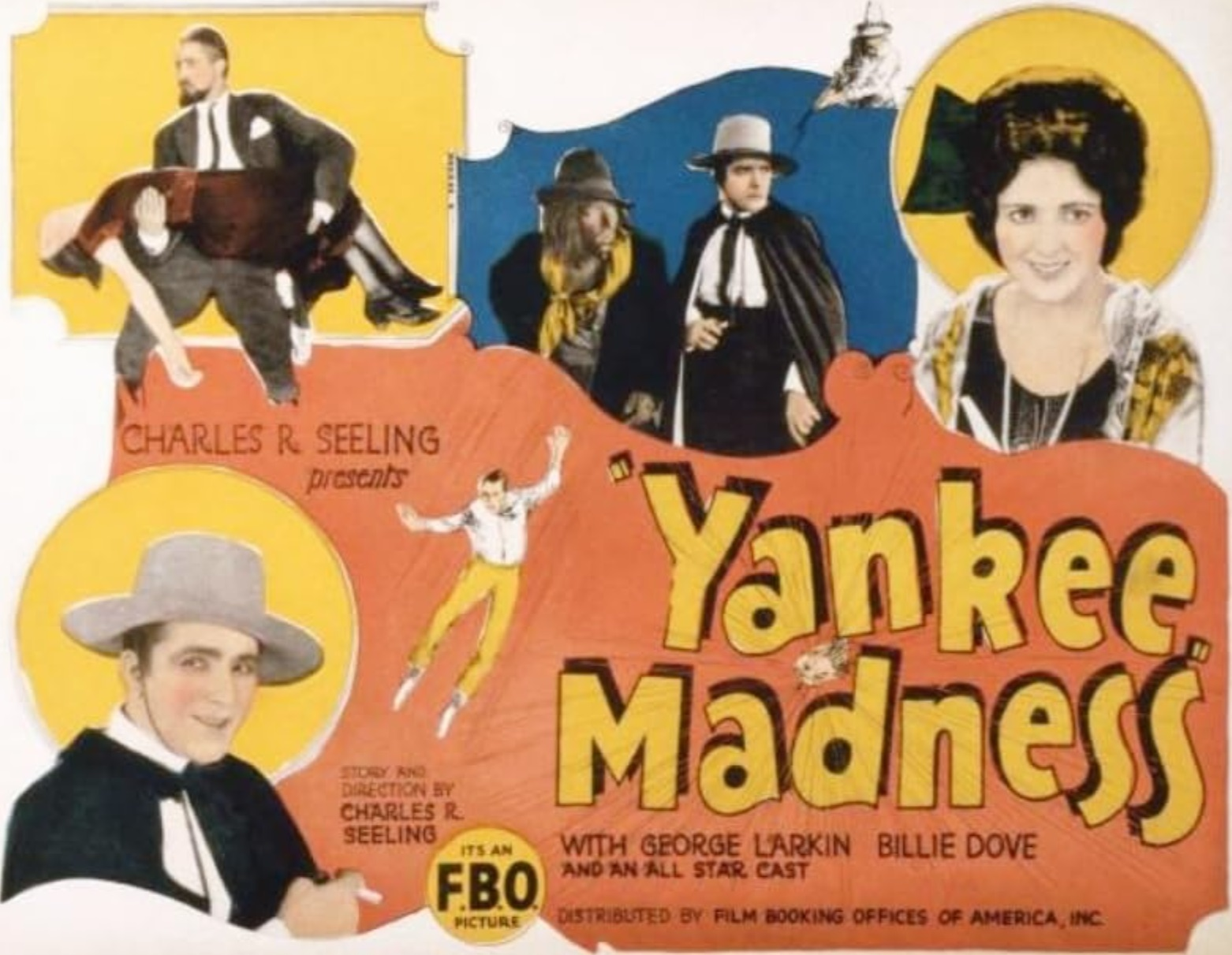
- Lobby card
- Directed by: Charles R. Seeling
- Written by: George H. Plympton; Charles R. Seeling
- Starring: George Larkin; Billie Dove; Walter Long
- Cinematography: Pliny Goodfriend
- Production company: Film Booking Offices of America
- Distributed by: Film Booking Offices of America
- Release date: March 31, 1924
- Running time: 50 minutes
- Country: United States
- Language: Silent (English intertitles)

Yankee Madness is a 1924 American silent drama film directed by Charles R. Seeling and starring George Larkin, Billie Dove, and Walter Long.

== Plot ==
As described in a film magazine review, Richard Morton rescues Dolores, a young Spanish woman, from bandits who attack her in New Orleans. Learning that she has gone to Sevilla, Central America, he follows. A revolution is in progress. Richard heads the forces of President Dominguez and defeats the rebels. He saves Dominguez and Dolores from their enemy, Rodolfo Emanon. It transpires that she is the President's daughter. Richard wins her affections and she becomes his wife.

== Cast ==
- George Larkin as Richard Morton
- Billie Dove as Dolores
- Walter Long as Pablo del Gardo
- Earl Schenck as Rodolfo Emanon
- Manuel Caméré as Estaban
- Ollie Kirby as Theresa
- Arthur Millett as Robert Morton
- J.L. Powell as President Dominguez
- Annette Perry as Duenna

== Censorship ==
Before Yankee Madness could be exhibited in Kansas, the Kansas Board of Review required the shortening of a scene in reel 3, which was a closeup of a woman's knee, and the elimination of a scene in reel 5, where a man is pierced with a sabre.

== Bibliography ==
- Munden, Kenneth White. The American Film Institute Catalog of Motion Pictures Produced in the United States, Part 1. University of California Press, 1997.
