= Terror of the Range =

1919 film

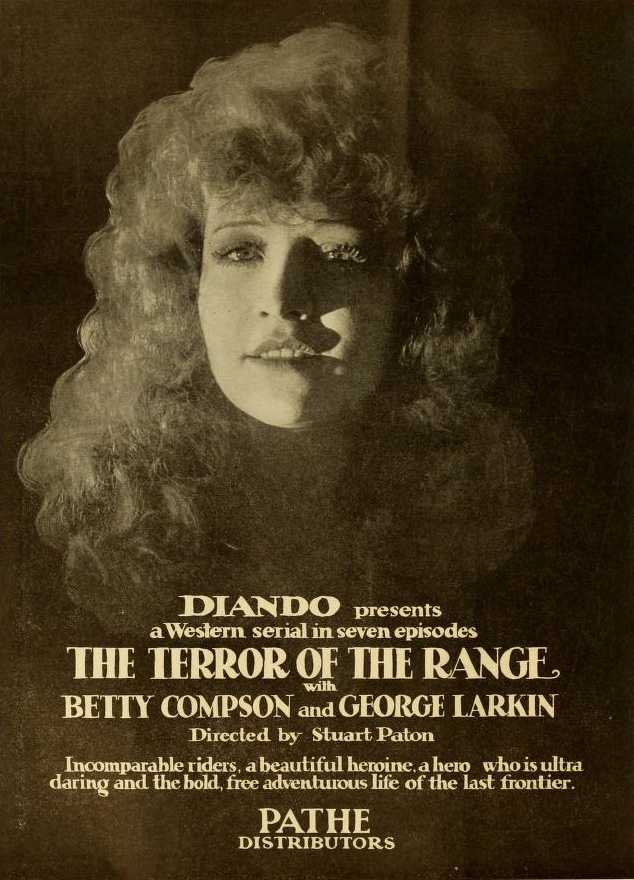
- Ad for film
- Directed by: Stuart Paton
- Written by: W. A. S. Douglas; Lucien Hubbard
- Starring: George Larkin; Betty Compson
- Distributed by: Pathé Exchange; Astra Films
- Release date: February 2, 1919
- Running time: 7 episodes
- Country: United States
- Languages: Silent; English intertitles

Terror of the Range is a 1919 American Western film serial directed by Stuart Paton. The film is considered to be lost. The film's working title was The Wolf-Faced Man.

== Cast ==
- George Larkin as John Hardwick
- Betty Compson as Thelma Grant
- Horace B. Carpenter as James Grant (credited as H.B. Carpenter)
- Fred Malatesta as John "Black John" (credited as Fred M. Malatesta)
- Ora Carew as Vampire
- True Boardman as "Broncho" Haryigan
- Walter MacNamara
- Alice Saunders
- William Quinn (credited as Billy Quinn)

== See also ==
- List of film serials
- List of film serials by studio
- List of lost films
