= Brace Up =

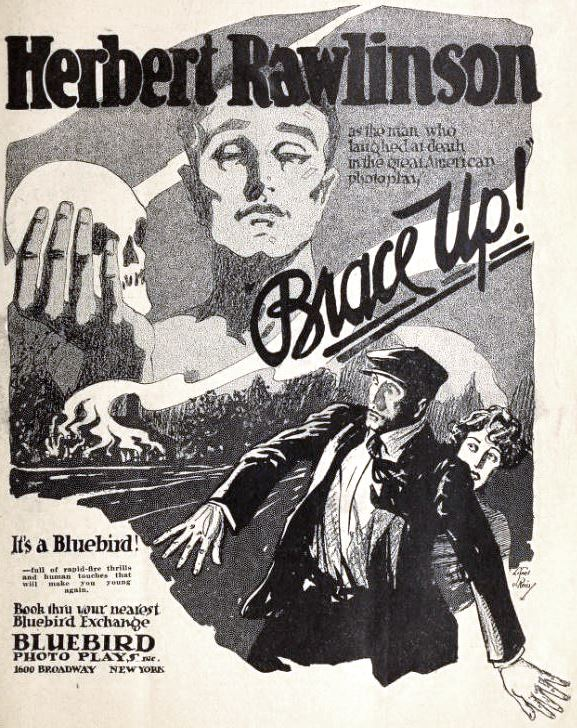
- Directed by: Elmer Clifton
- Written by: Waldemar Young; Elmer Clifton
- Produced by: Elmer Clifton
- Starring: Herbert Rawlinson; Claire Du Brey; Alfred Allen
- Cinematography: Virgil Miller
- Production company: Universal Pictures
- Distributed by: Universal Pictures
- Release date: March 18, 1918
- Running time: 50 minutes
- Country: United States
- Languages: Silent; English intertitles

Brace Up is a 1918 American silent thriller film directed by Elmer Clifton and starring Herbert Rawlinson, Claire Du Brey and Alfred Allen.

== Cast ==
- Herbert Rawlinson as Henry Court
- Claire Du Brey as Ellen Miles
- Alfred Allen as Col. Court
- Sam De Grasse as National Jim

== Bibliography ==
- James Robert Parish & Michael R. Pitts. Film directors: a guide to their American films. Scarecrow Press, 1974.
