= The Severed Hand =

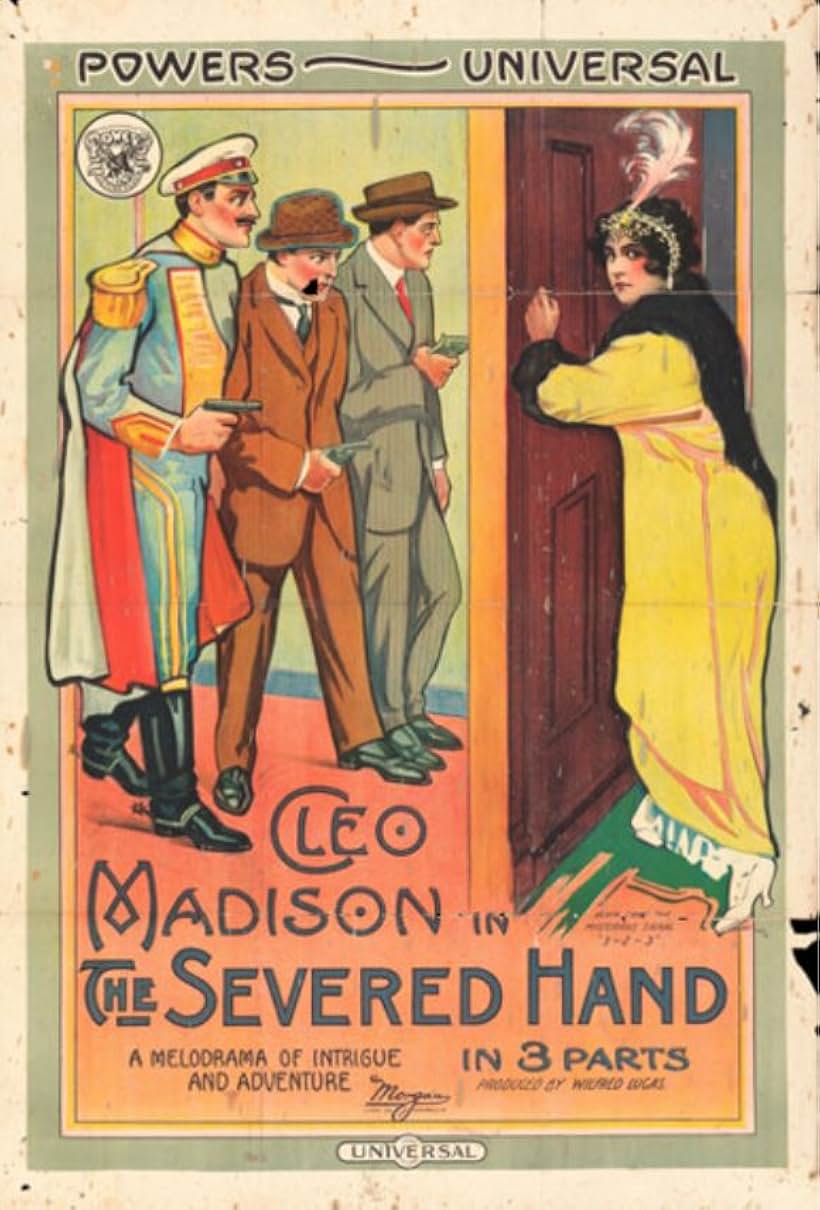
- Directed by: Wilfred Lucas
- Based on: a story for the screen by Bess Meredyth
- Produced by: Pat Powers
- Starring: Cleo Madison; George Larkin; Edward Sloman
- Distributed by: Universal Film Manufacturing Company
- Release date: July 17, 1914
- Running time: 3 reels
- Country: USA
- Language: Silent (English intertitles)

The Severed Hand is a 1914 silent short drama film directed by Wilfred Lucas and starring Cleo Madison, George Larkin and Edward Sloman. It was produced by Powers Picture Plays and distributed through Universal Film Manufacturing Company.

== Cast ==
- Cleo Madison - Nan Dawson
- George Larkin - Dick Ralston
- Edwin Alexander - Danny Dawson
- Edward Sloman
- Frank Lanning
- William V. Mong - ?
