= Social Briars =

1918 American silent comedy-drama film

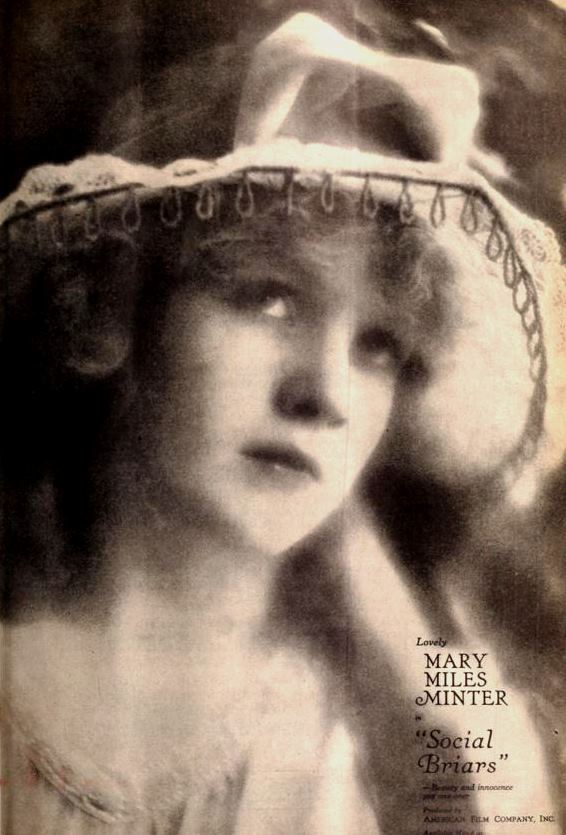
- Minter in film promotion in Exhibitors Herald, 1918
- Directed by: Henry King
- Written by: Edward Sloman (scenario)
- Screenplay by: Jeanne Judson
- Starring: Mary Miles Minter
- Cinematography: Ira H. Morgan
- Production company: American Film Company
- Distributed by: Mutual Film
- Release date: May 13, 1918 (United States)
- Running time: 5 reels
- Country: United States
- Language: Silent (English intertitles)

Social Briars is a 1918 American silent comedy-drama film directed by Henry King and starring Mary Miles Minter. The story was by Jeanne Judson, and it was filmed under the working title of "The Greater Call." As with many of Minter's features, it is thought to be a lost film.

== Plot ==
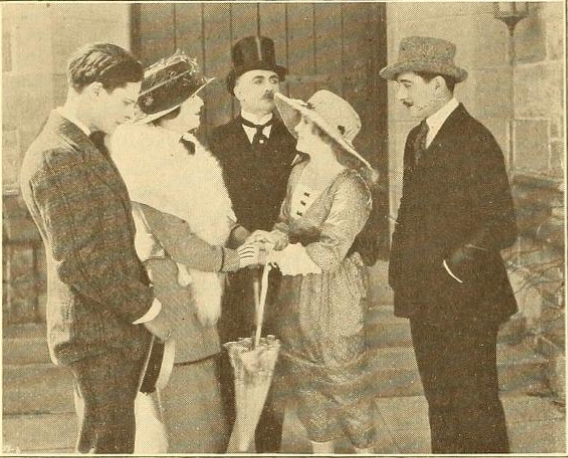
Scene from "Social Briars" (1918)

As described in various film magazine reviews, Iris Lee is an orphan girl who lives in a little country town with Martha Kane. She plays the organ and sings at the village Sunday school, where Mrs. Kane's son Jim teaches. Jim is in love with Iris, but Iris dreams of being a famous singer in the city. The only people who take her ambitions seriously are her neighbours, Mr. and Mrs. Brown.

One day, Iris packs up and decides to head for the city to seek her fame and fortune. She misses the train, but is offered a ride from a passing stranger, Jack Andrews, a wealthy young city man. He flirts with her in the car and Iris, feeling uncomfortable, jumps out and waits for a later train. When she arrives in the city, she struggles to find a way to earn a living, but one day she is walking past a church and, upon hearing the choir, decides to enter and join in. Her voice catches the attention of Peter Andrews, who happens to be Jack's father, and she is given the position of soloist at the church.

One night while singing at the church, Iris is overheard by Helen Manning, a light opera star, who takes Iris on as her understudy. When Helen is dropped from the opera for refusing the advances of her manager Franklin, Iris is promoted to the prima donna role. Jack has seen Iris performing with the opera and has fallen in love with her, but when he enters her dressing room drunk one night, Iris sends him away.

Disillusioned with fame and with the city, Iris returns to the country town and takes up her old position at the Sunday school. Jack, having sobered up and taken on a proper job as a travelling salesman for his father's business, follows her there. He manages to persuade Iris of his sincerity, and the two are engaged to wed.

== Cast ==
- Mary Miles Minter as Iris Lee
- Allan Forrest as Jack Andrews
- Anne Schaefer as Martha Kane
- Edmund Cobb as Jim Kane
- George Periolat as Peter Andrews
- Claire Du Brey as Helen Manning
- Milla Davenport as Mrs. Brown
- Jacob Abrams as Mr. Brown
- Frank Whitson as Franklin
