= What Every Woman Wants (1919 film) =

1919 American film directed by Jesse D. Hampton

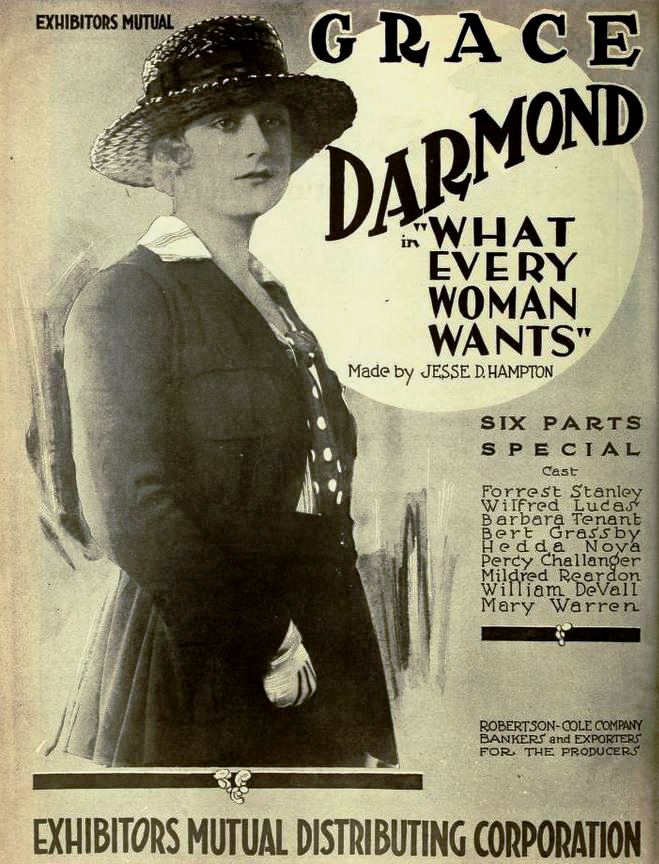
- Advertisement for the film
- Directed by: Jesse D. Hampton
- Written by: William Parker (story and screenplay)
- Starring: Grace Darmond; Wilfred Lucas
- Distributed by: Robertson-Cole Pictures Corporation
- Release date: February 23, 1919
- Running time: 75 minutes
- Country: United States
- Language: Silent (English intertitles)

What Every Woman Wants is a 1919 American drama film directed by Jesse D. Hampton and starring Grace Darmond, Wilfred Lucas, Forrest Stanley, and Claire Du Brey. Based on a screenplay by William Parker, the film was released by the Robertson-Cole Pictures Corporation.

== Plot ==
As described in a film magazine, Gloria Graham (Darmond), a young woman employed at an office for a small salary, believes that the capacity of a business woman for success depends upon dressing well. After she goes into debt, she is about to be rescued by marriage to the man she loves, Philip Belden (Stanley), but World War I breaks out and he enlists. She then falls for a snare set by her employer Horace Lennon (Lucas), who sends her to a clothing shop with a card allowing her to buy what she wants and to charge it to his account. After news arrives that her lover is missing in action, she marries her employer to allow her to indulge in her love of luxury. Her soldier lover, released from a German prisoner-of-war camp, returns and discovers that Gloria is married. He happens to be in the vicinity of her husband's house when the husband is accidentally shot by the maid. Gloria is suspected of killing her husband and arrested, but the truth is revealed by the end of the film.

== Cast ==
- Wilfred Lucas as Horace Lennon
- Grace Darmond as Gloria Graham
- Forrest Stanley as Philip Belden
- Percy Challenger as Timothy Dunn
- Bertram Grassby as Marston Hughes
- Barbara Tennant as Phyllis Miles
- Claire Du Brey as Sylvia
- William De Vaull as Norman
- Mary Warren as Mamie Vezey
- Charles K. French as Attorney for the Defense (credited as Charles French)
