= The Border Raiders =

1918 American silent Western film

- Directed by: Stuart Paton
- Written by: Frank S. Beresford; Jack Cunningham; Stuart Paton
- Starring: Betty Compson; George Larkin
- Cinematography: William H. Thornley
- Production company: Diando Film Corp.
- Distributed by: Pathé Exchange
- Release date: October 6, 1918
- Running time: 5 reels
- Country: United States
- Languages: Silent; English intertitles

The Border Raiders is a 1918 American silent Western film directed by Stuart Paton and starring Betty Compson and George Larkin. It was shot on the Hopi Reservation in Arizona.

== Plot ==
As described in a film magazine, Mock Sing (Deshon) runs a gambling den along the Mexico–United States border on the Rio Grande. It is the headquarters for a gang of cattle rustlers and opium smugglers. John Hardy (Carpenter), a millionaire rancher, makes the acquaintance of an adventuress connected to Mock Sing's place and the gang of crooks plans to gain possession of the Hardy properties. The adventuress marries Hardy and goes home with him, where she meets his daughter Rose (Compson). The gang captures Hardy and takes him to Mock Sing's house. Rose, learning of her father's predicament, goes to the gambling den to rescue him and is saved from Sing by the faro dealer, who proves to be a federal agent working to get evidence against the gang. Mock Sing is killed and the gang members are arrested by the Texas Rangers.

== Cast ==
- Betty Compson as Rose Hardy
- George Larkin as John Smith
- Frank Deshon as Mock Sing
- H. C. Carpenter as John Hardy
- Claire Du Brey as Cleo Dade
- Howard Crampton as Emanuel Riggs
- Fred M. Malatesta as "Square Deal" Dixon

== Reception ==
The film premiered at the Jewel Theater in Hamilton, Ontario. Like many American films of the time, The Border Raiders was subject to cuts by city and state film censorship boards. For example, the Chicago Board of Censors required a cut, in Reel 3, scene with shooting during a fight, slugging of Chinese man after he is pulled from horse, Reel 4, Chinese man suggestively leering at young woman on couch, two closeups of man with rope around neck, Reel 5, Chinese man tying young woman, and three shooting scenes where men fall.

== Preservation ==
A complete print of The Border Raiders is held by the Archives du Film du CNC in Bois d'Arcy.
