= Dangerous Hours =

1919 film

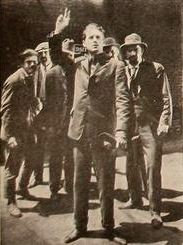
- Film still with Lloyd Hughes
- Directed by: Fred Niblo
- Written by: C. Gardner Sullivan (screenplay)
- Based on: "A Prodigal in Utopia" by Brian Oswald Donn-Byrne
- Produced by: Thomas H. Ince
- Starring: Lloyd Hughes; Barbara Castleton; Claire Du Brey
- Cinematography: George Barnes
- Production company: Famous Players–Lasky/Artcraft
- Distributed by: Paramount Pictures
- Release date: December 1919
- Running time: 70 minutes
- Country: United States
- Languages: Silent; English intertitles

Dangerous Hours is a 1919 American silent drama film directed by Fred Niblo. Prints of the film survive in the UCLA Film & Television Archive. It premiered in February 1920.

The film was based on a short story "A Prodigal in Utopia" published in the Saturday Evening Post. The film's working title was Americanism (Versus Bolshevism), which was the title of a pamphlet published by Ole Hanson, the mayor of Seattle who claimed to have broken the Seattle General Strike in 1919.

== Plot ==
The film tells the story of an attempted Russian infiltration of American industry, and includes a depiction of the "nationalization of women" under Bolshevism, including "extras on horseback, rounding up women, throwing them into dungeons and beating them."

College graduate John King (Hughes) is sympathetic to the left in a general way. Then he is seduced, both romantically and politically, by Sophia Guerni (Du Brey), a female agitator. Her superior is the Bolshevik Boris Blotchi (Richardson), who has a "wild dream of planting the scarlet seed of terrorism in American soil." Sofia and Boris turn their attention to the Weston shipyards that are managed by John's childhood sweetheart. The workers have valid grievances, but the Bolsheviks set out to manipulate the situation. They are "the dangerous element following in the wake of labor as riffraff and ghouls follow an army." When they threaten John's earlier love, he has an epiphany and renounces revolutionary doctrine.

== Cast ==
- Lloyd Hughes as John King
- Barbara Castleton as Mary Weston
- Claire Du Brey as Sophia Guerni
- Jack Richardson as Boris Blotchi
- Walt Whitman as Dr. King
- Louis Morrison as Michael Regan (as Lew Morrison)
- Gordon Mullen as Andrew Felton

== Response to the film ==
A reviewer in the movie magazine Picture Play protested the film's stew of radical beliefs and strategies: "Please, oh please, look up the meaning of the words 'bolshevik,' and 'soviet.' Neither of them mean [sic] 'anarchist,' 'scoundrel' or 'murderer' – really they don't!"

== See also ==
- Red Scare of 1919-20

== Bibliography ==
- Kevin Brownlow, The Parade's Gone By... (Berkeley: University of California Press, 1968)
- Patricia King Hanson and Alan Gevinson, eds., The American Film Institute Catalog of Motion Pictures Produced in the United States, vol.F-1 Feature Films, 1911-1920 (Berkeley: University of California Press, 1988), p. 187
