= The Cowboy King =

1922 film

- Directed by: Charles R. Seeling
- Starring: Guinn 'Big Boy' Williams; Patricia Palmer; Elizabeth De Witt
- Production company: Charles R. Seeling Productions
- Distributed by: Aywon Film Corporation
- Release date: May 1922
- Running time: 50 minutes
- Country: United States
- Languages: Silent; English intertitles

The Cowboy King is a 1922 American silent Western film directed by Charles R. Seeling and starring Guinn 'Big Boy' Williams, Patricia Palmer and Elizabeth De Witt.

== Cast ==
- Guinn 'Big Boy' Williams as Dud Smiley
- Patricia Palmer as Ethel Dunlap
- Elizabeth De Witt as Mrs Stacey
- William Austin as Wilbur
- Chet Ryan as Life Butters
- William Dyer as Bart Hadley
- Mae Summers as Norma
