= Claire Du Brey =

American actor

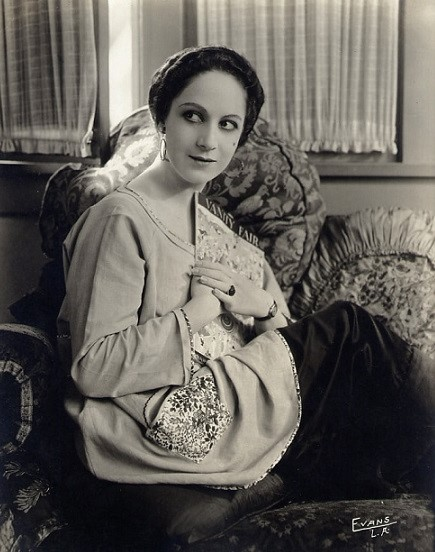
- Du Brey, c. 1920
- Born: Clara Violet Dubreyvich; August 31, 1892; Bonners Ferry, Idaho
- Died: August 1, 1993 (aged 100); Los Angeles, California
- Other names: Claire Du Bray; Claire Dubrey
- Occupation: Actress
- Years active: 1916–1959
- Spouse(s): Mark G. Gates (m. 1911; div. 192?)

Claire Du Brey (born Clara Violet Dubreyvich, August 31, 1892 – August 1, 1993) was an American actress. She appeared in more than 200 films from 1916 to 1959. Her name is sometimes rendered as Claire Du Bray or as Claire Dubrey.

== Early years ==
Du Brey was born in Bonner's Ferry, Idaho, to an Irish-American mother, Lilly (née Henry), later Mrs. Richard Fugitt. Her parents married on November 9, 1891, in Pocatello, Bannock County, Idaho. She was raised Catholic and attended a convent school.

Du Brey "had trained as a nurse". She related that in 1897 she traveled west from Idaho in a covered wagon with her mother and her grandfather.

== Career ==
Du Brey's screen career began with Universal Studios and she played at one time or another with almost all the larger companies. More notable films in which she appeared were Anything Once (1917), Social Briars (1918), The Devil's Trail (1919), What Every Woman Wants (1919) and Dangerous Hours (1919). Other films include The Wishing Ring Man, The Spite Bride, The World Aflame, and The Walk Offs. Her career declined with the sound era and she later played mostly small roles.

In the 1930s, Du Brey was an agent for other actors. Her clients included Mary Carlisle, Richard Cromwell, and Kitty Kelly. Late in 1934, Anna Q. Nilsson joined Du Brey's operation, making contacts with producers and directors, while Du Brey handled the office part of the business.

Du Brey was proficient in athletics, excelling in swimming, riding, golfing, tennis and motoring. She was five feet seven inches high, weighed 130 pounds and had auburn hair and brown eyes, and took a lively interest in horticulture.

== Later life and death ==
According to two biographies of Marie Dressler published in the late 1990s, Dressler and Du Brey had a long-term romantic relationship. However one other (perhaps less reliable) source from 1920 indicates that Du Brey, who had trained as a nurse, was the elder actress's "assistant and caregiver" while Dressler was ill with terminal cancer.

Du Brey married Los Angeles medical doctor Norman Gates on November 25, 1911; the couple divorced sometime in the 1920s. On August 1, 1993, Du Brey died in Los Angeles, aged 100.

== Selected filmography ==
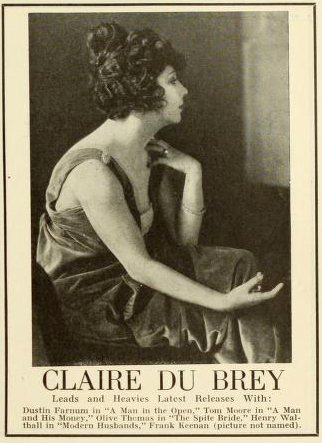
Advertisement, 1919

- The Piper's Price (1917)
- The Drifter (1917)
- The Fighting Gringo (1917)
- Hair-Trigger Burke (1917)
- The Winged Mystery (1917)
- The Honor of an Outlaw (1917)
- A 44-Calibre Mystery (1917)
- Follow the Girl (1917)
- The Almost Good Man (1917)
- Six-Shooter Justice (1917)
- The Rescue (1917)
- Pay Me! (1917)
- The Reward of the Faithless (1917)
- Triumph (1917)
- Anything Once (1917)
- The Magic Eye (1918)
- Prisoners of the Pines (1918)
- Modern Love (1918)
- Social Briars (1918)
- Madame Spy (1918)
- Brace Up (1918)
- The Border Raiders (1918)
- Up Romance Road (1918)
- Midnight Madness (1918)
- The Wishing Ring Man (1919)
- A Man and His Money (1919)
- The Devil's Trail (1919)
- The Spite Bride (1919)
- Dangerous Hours (1919)
- The World Aflame (1919)
- What Every Woman Wants (1919)
- When Fate Decides (1919)
- The Walk-Offs (1920)
- The Green Flame (1920)
- The House of Whispers (1920)
- A Light Woman (1920)
- The Heart of a Child (1920)
- That Girl Montana (1921)
- My Lady's Latchkey (1921)
- I Am Guilty (1921)
- The Bronze Bell (1921)
- The Hole in the Wall (1921)
- The Ordeal (1922)
- Only a Shop Girl (1922)
- When Love Comes (1922)
- Glass Houses (1922)
- The Voice from the Minaret (1923)
- Ponjola (1923)
- Borrowed Husbands (1924)
- The Sea Hawk (1924)
- Drusilla with a Million (1925)
- The Girl of Gold (1925)
- Infatuation (1925)
- The Exquisite Sinner (1926)
- The Devil Dancer (1927)
- Two Sisters (1929)
- For the Love o' Lil (1930)
- Shadows of Sing Sing (1933)
- Among the Missing (1934)
- Merry Wives of Reno (1934)
- Ramona (1936)
- The Lady Escapes (1937)
- The Affairs of Annabel (1938)
- The Baroness and the Butler (1938)
- The Strange Case of Dr. Meade (1938)
- Jesse James (1939)
- The Story of Alexander Graham Bell (1939)
- Tillie the Toiler (1941)
- Juke Box Jenny (1942)
- Oh, What a Night (1944)
- Lights of Old Santa Fe (1944)
- Dakota (1945)
- Star in the Night (1945) (short film)
- The Best Years of Our Lives (1946)
- The Secret of the Whistler (1946)
- The Bishop's Wife (1947)
- French Leave (1948)
- Abbott and Costello Meet the Killer, Boris Karloff (1949)
- Cinderella (1950)
- Destination Big House (1950)
- Raiders of the Seven Seas (1953)

== Bibliography ==
- Kennedy, Matthew (1999). Marie Dressler: A Biography, With a Listing of Major Stage Performances, a Filmography And a Discography. McFarland. ISBN 0-7864-0520-1.
- Lee, Betty (1997). Marie Dressler: The Unlikeliest Star. University of Kentucky Press. ISBN 0-8131-2036-5.
