= Jeanne Judson =

American journalist

- Born: January 5, 1888 or 1889; Michigan
- Died: January 9, 1981

Jeanne Judson (January 5, 1888 or 1889 – January 9, 1981) was an American reporter and novelist. She began her writing career as a contributor to various newspapers and magazines. During the early and middle 20th century, she published more than 70 romance novels. She also published under the aliases Emily Thorne and Francis Dean Hancock.

== Career ==
=== Editor ===
Judson was born in Michigan but lived in various cities throughout her life, including San Francisco, Chicago, Detroit, New York, Grand Rapids, and St. Louis. She claimed that she had started doing editorial work for a living as early as the age of 15. During her career, she worked as a printer, a proof-reader, a reporter, a press agent, an advertising copy writer, an advertising salesperson, and an editor.

She worked as a reporter in Grand Rapids, Michigan, Chicago, and St. Louis. In 1916, she moved to New York and joined the editorial staff of The Smart Set as an editor. She also contributed to The Sun's Sunday supplement, the Ladies Home Journal, and Harper's Bazaar.

=== Author ===
Judson's fiction work included short stories and novels in both single publication and serial forms. Two of her novels were made into films, The Beckoning Roads and Social Briars, shortly after their publication. After a few early fiction successes, she mostly published non-fiction pieces until the 1950s when she returned to publishing romance novels.

== Bibliography ==
Nonfiction

- "In the Shops of the Smart Set" – April, May, June, July, August, September, October, November, December 1915 (The Smart Set)
- "Making War on Waste" – September 1917 (The Mother's Magazine)
- What Every Woman Should Know About Furniture – 1940 (Frederick A. Stokes Co)

Novels

- Aaron's Serpent – 1962 (Avalon)
- Abby Goes to Washington – 1957 (Avalon)
- Alice Comes Home – 1970 (Valentine)
- All's Fair in Love – 1953 (Valentine)
- Angel on Skis – 1959 (Airmont)
- April Laughter – 1960 (Avalon)
- Barbara Ames, Private Secretary – 1961 (Thomas Bouregy)
- Beckoning Roads –1919 (Dodd, Mead, & Co.)
- Betty Terry Beauty Editor – 1957 (Avalon)
- A Blue Ribbon for Alice – 1957 (Avalon)
- Buyer of Dreams – 1963 (Thomas Bouregy & Co)
- Camp Counselor – 1963 (Avalon)
- Cape Cod Summer – 1955 (Avalon)
- The Captive Maid – 1966 (Airmont)
- Carol Trent, Air Stewardess – 1957 (Bantam)
- Cecily's Island – 1965 (Avalon)
- Cecily's Promise – 1968 (Avon)
- City Nurse – 1960 (Bantam)
- Country Teacher – 1962 (Avalon)
- Cover Girl – 1961 (Bantam)
- A Cup for Janet – 1957 (Airmont)
- Dance on a Rainbow – 1959 (Avalon)
- A Doctor for a Nurse also published as Visiting Nurse – 1955 (W. Foulsham)
- Doctor Mary – 1964 (Avalon)
- The Doctor of Blue Valley – 1960 (Avalon)
- Dreamer's World – 1969 (Avalon)
- Embassy Girl – 1964 (Airmont)
- Enter Nurse Marian, also published as Small Town Nurse – 1956 (Avalon)
- Flight from Love – 1962 (Avalon)
- Flight Hostess – 1958 (Avalon)
- The Flowering Vine – 1964 (Avalon)
- Forever Julie – 1968 (Avalon)
- Happy Ending – 1960 (Avalon)
- Happy Valley, also published as Home Is the Heart – 1966 (Avalon)
- Haunted Summer – 1953 (Avalon)
- Heart Is Wiser, The – 1953 (Avalon)
- Helen Walks Alone – 1975 (Avalon)
- Home Is the Heart, also published as Happy Valley – 1966 (Valentine)
- House of Enchantment – 1970 (Avalon)
- The House on 16th Street – 1967 (Dell)
- The Island Heirs – 1971 (Bantam)
- Janet Goes Abroad – 1975 (Fawcett)
- John Keith, Intern – 1963 (Avalon)
- Just Sally – 1963 (Avalon)
- Lady Guide – 1954 (Avalon)
- Laura Sees It Through – 1967 (Avalon)
- Legacy of Fear – 1969 (Prestige)
- The Legacy of Redfern – 1968 (Avalon)
- Linda Vale, Fashion Designer – 1962 (Bantam)
- Love Regained – 1974 (Avalon)
- The Magic Words – 1959 (Avalon)
- Marcia and the Inca Gold – 1966 (Avalon)
- Meg's Choice – 1964 (Avalon)
- Mysterious Isle – 1967 (Avalon)
- The Mystery of Knickerbocker Towers – 1960 (Avalon)
- Nancy Ross Private Secretary – 1956 (Avalon)
- Nothing to Pretend – 1963 (Avalon)
- Nurse Julie and the Knight – 1965 (Avalon)
- Nurses Don't Tell – 1962 (Avalon)
- The Only Girl – 1968 (Avalon)
- Option on Love – 1957 (Avalon)
- The Other Basket – 1952 (Bouregy & Curl)
- The Other Love – 1974 (Fawcett)
- A Pledge of Love – 1969 (Avalon)
- Prelude to Spring – 1971 (Bantam)
- The Reluctant Cavalier – 1955 (Avalon)
- Remembered Melody – 1964 (Avalon)
- Resident Nurse – 1966 (Avalon)
- Small Town Girl – 1968 (Prestige)
- Small Town Nurse, also published as Enter Nurse Marian – 1956 (Avon)
- The Spellbound Heart – 1970 (Valentine)
- A Strange Case for Doctor Rolland – 1962 (Popular Library)
- Sue Warren, Decorator – 1958 (Avalon)
- Summer Cruise – 1958 (Avalon)
- Susan Brown, Camp Counselor – 1956 (Airmont)
- Temple of the Sun – 1966 (Valentine)
- Thing of Beauty, A – 1963 (Avalon)
- Three Loves for Cecily – 1964 (Avalon)
- Treasure of Love – 1966 (Valentine)
- Treasure of Wycliffe House – 1967 (Avalon)
- Visiting Nurse, also published as Doctor for a Nurse – 1957 (Bantam)
- The Walled Garden – 1975 (Avalon)

Short stories and novellas

- "All Things Come" – August 1918 (Young's Magazine)
- "The Church Window" – Angel, January 1918 (Breezy Stories)
- "The Copper Isle" – November 1921 (Smith's Magazine)
- "The Dangerous Woman" – October 1917 (Breezy Stories)
- "The Father of Her Child" – April 1922 (Breezy Stories)
- "Her Man" – November 1919 (Ladies' Home Journal)
- "The Little Parasites" – September 1917 (Young's Magazine)
- "Money to Love" – November 1932 (Young's Magazine)
- "The Perfect Husband" – August 1943 (Breezy Stories)
- "Peter the Impetuous" – April 1918 (The Argosy)
- "Philoprogenitives" – June 1933 (Harper's Bazaar)
- "Poor Little Mabel" – January 1922 (Breezy Stories)
- "Red Lilies" – October 1919 (People's Favorite Magazine)
- "The Road to Wingate House" – 1923 (Yellow Book #44)
- "The Sign of the Bull" – October 1918 (Young's Magazine)
- "That Strange Girl" – December 1917 (Breezy Stories)
- "The Wind That Blows" – February 1917 (Young's Magazine)

Serials

- "The Call of Life" – August, September, October, November, December 1918 (The Red Book Magazine)
- "Crowns of Tin" – March, April, May, June 1918 (The Red Book Magazine)
- "Port o' Dreams" – March, April, May, June, July, August, September 1920 The (Green Book Magazine)
