= Douglas Gerrard =

American actor (1891–1950)

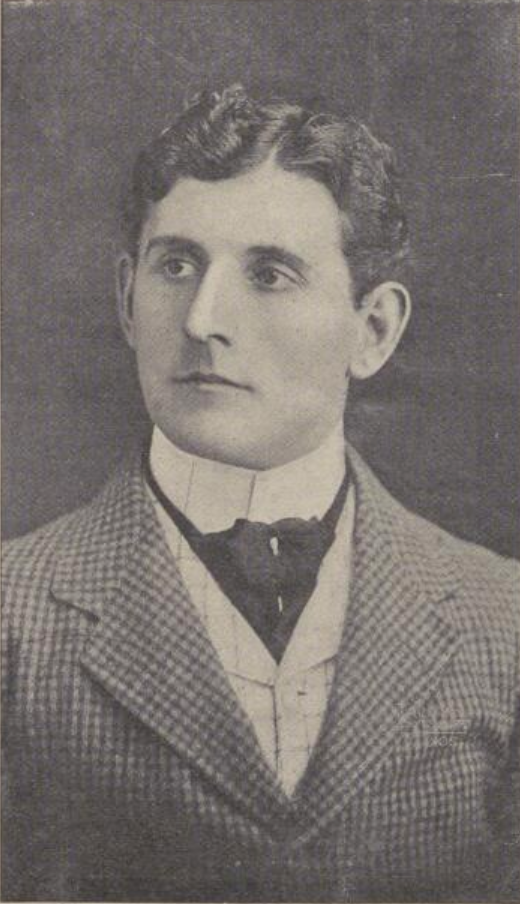
- Leading man with the Tittell Brune Company in Australia in 1905
- Born: 12 August 1891; Dublin, Ireland
- Died: 5 June 1950 (aged 58); Hollywood, California, USA
- Occupations: Actor, film director
- Years active: 1914-1939

Douglas Gerrard (12 August 1891 – 5 June 1950) was an Irish-American actor and film director of the silent and early sound era. He appeared in more than 110 films between 1913 and 1949. He also directed 23 films between 1916 and 1920. He was born in Dublin, Ireland and died in Hollywood, California. He was the brother of actor Charles K. Gerrard.

Gerrard was a leading man in Kalem films.

== Selected filmography ==
- Suspense (1913)
- The Merchant of Venice (1914)
- The Quicksands (1914)
- The Potter and the Clay (1914)
- Undine (1916)
- A Soul Enslaved (1916)
- The Dumb Girl of Portici (1916)
- Naked Hearts (1916)
- Polly Put the Kettle On (1917)
- The Velvet Hand (1918)
- Madame Spy (1918)
- The Forged Bride (1920)
- The Lady from Longacre (1921)
- Omar the Tentmaker (1922)
- On Time (1924)
- The Lighthouse by the Sea (1924)
- In Fast Company (1924)
- Wings of Youth (1925)
- Footloose Widows (1926)
- Private Izzy Murphy (1926)
- Doubling with Danger (1926)
- The First Auto (1927)
- A Million Bid (1927)
- Dearie (1927)
- The College Widow (1927)
- The Desired Woman (1927)
- Wolf's Clothing (1927)
- Five and Ten Cent Annie (1928)
- Ladies of the Night Club (1928)
- The Hottentot (1929)
- General Crack (1929)
- Lilies of the Field (1930)
- Bulldog Drummond Strikes Back (1934)
- The Ghost Walks (1934)
- Ants in the Pantry (1936)
- Under Two Flags (1936)
- Quick Millions (1939)
