= The Apache Dancer =

1923 silent film

- Directed by: Charles R. Seeling
- Starring: George Larkin; Ollie Kirby; Marie Newall
- Production company: Charles R. Seeling Productions
- Distributed by: Aywon Film Corporation
- Release date: December 1923
- Running time: 50 minutes
- Country: United States
- Language: Silent (English intertitles)

The Apache Dancer is a 1923 American silent drama film directed by Charles R. Seeling and starring George Larkin, Ollie Kirby.

== Theme ==
Melodramatic romance in which an Apache dancer, after saving the life of an American visitor to a Paris cafe and inheriting a fortune, comes to America to pursue his suit for the hand of the beautiful girl. The villains frustrated in their plan by the dancer fellow and their scheme to discredit him ends when a thrilling fight culminates in triumph for the dancer.

== Cast ==
- George Larkin as Apache Dancer
- Marie Newall as Helen Wayne
- George Williams as John Wayne
- Ollie Kirby as Nita Jo
- Julian Rivero as Count Nevair
- Lew Carter as George Armand
- Scotty McGee as Louis Gagnoix

== Bibliography ==
- The American Film Institute Catalog of Motion Pictures Produced in the United States. Feature Films, 1921-1930. Film Entries. University of California Press, 1971. The Apache Dancer : p. 22.
