= George Larkin =

American actor

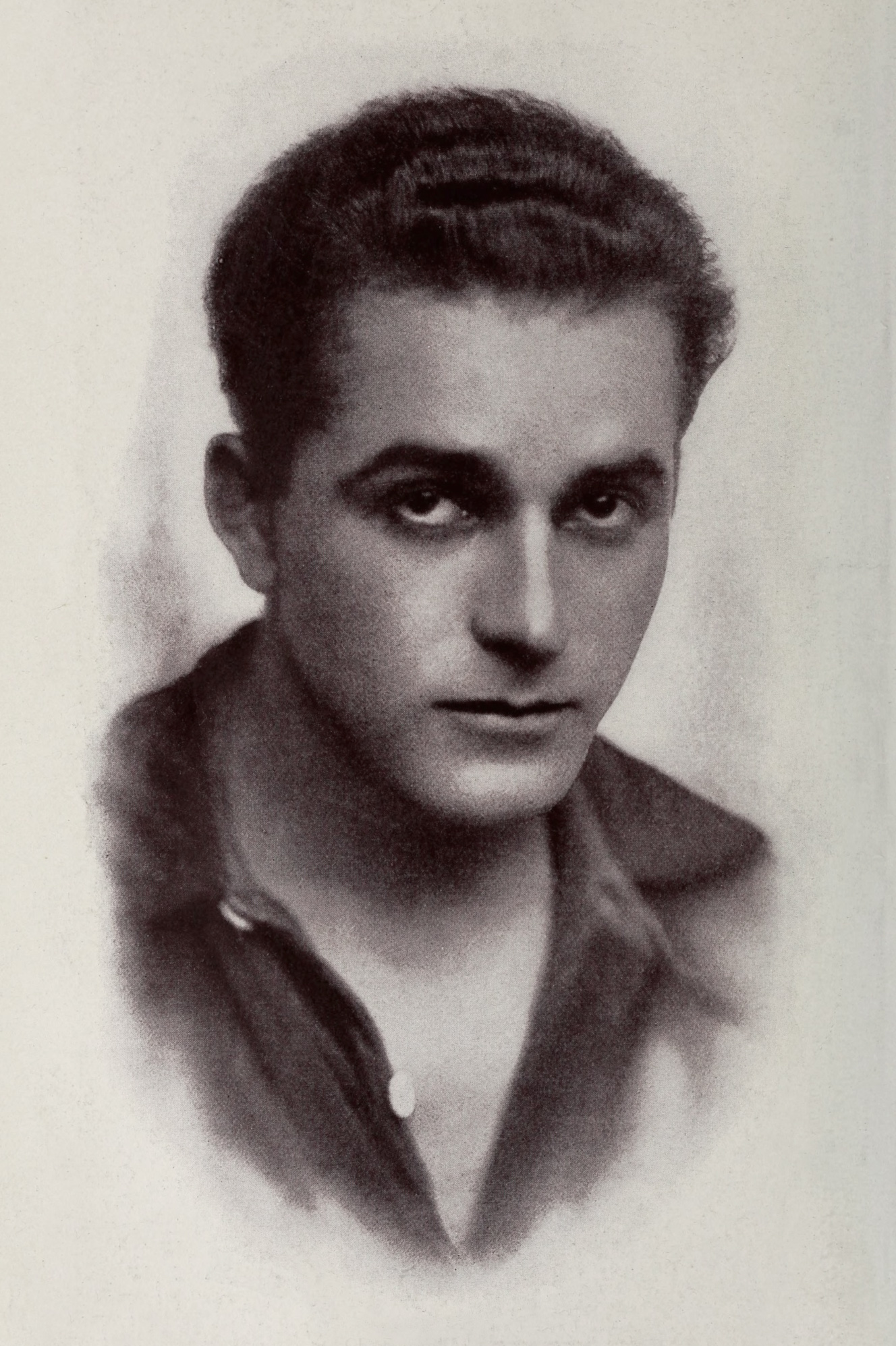
- Larkin in 1914 (Motion Picture Magazine)
- Born: November 11, 1887; New York, New York, U.S.
- Died: March 27, 1946 (aged 58); New York, New York, U.S.
- Occupation: Actor
- Years active: 1910–1931
- Spouse: Ollie Kirkby

George Larkin (November 11, 1887 – March 27, 1946) was an American film actor of the silent era. He appeared in more than 150 films between 1910 and 1931. He was born and died in New York, New York. He was married to actress Ollie Kirkby.

In addition to his acting career, Larkin also wrote scripts with his wife, which include Bulldog Courage (1922) and The Pell Street Mystery (1924). Larkin starred in both of these films. His archive is held by the University of California.

== Selected filmography ==
- Robin Hood (1912)
- The Body in the Trunk (1914)
- The Severed Hand (1914)
- The Trey o' Hearts (1914)
- Unto Those Who Sin (1916)
- The Woman in the Case (1916)
- The Primitive Call (1917)
- Hands Up! (1918)
- The Border Raiders (1918)
- Terror of the Range (1919)
- The Devil's Trail (1919)
- The Tiger's Trail (1919)
- The Adventures of Ruth (1919)
- Beauty and the Bandit (1921)
- Cameron of the Royal Mounted (1921)
- The Man Trackers (1921)
- Terror Trail (1921)
- Barriers of Folly (1922)
- Bulldog Courage (1922)
- Boomerang Justice (1922)
- Her Reputation (1923)
- The Tango Cavalier (1923)
- The Apache Dancer (1923)
- Midnight Secrets (1924)
- The Pell Street Mystery (1924)
- Stop at Nothing (1924)
- Yankee Madness (1924)
- The Right Man (1925)
- Getting 'Em Right (1925)
- Rough Stuff (1925)
- Midnight Rose (1928)
