= Bulldog Courage (1922 film) =

1922 film

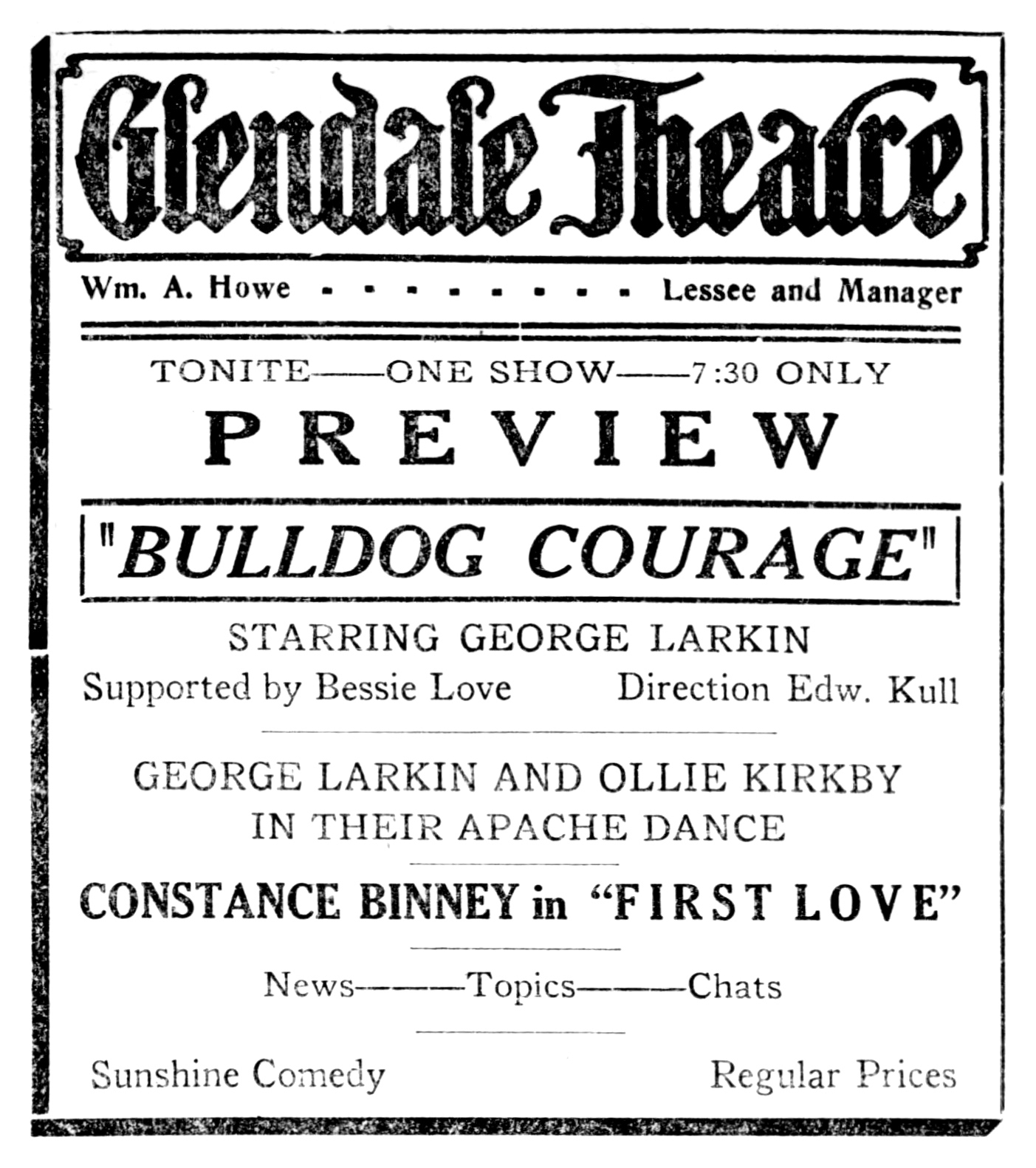
- Newspaper ad
- Directed by: Edward A. Kull
- Written by: George Larkin; Ollie Kirkby
- Story by: Jeanne Poe
- Starring: George Larkin; Bessie Love
- Cinematography: Harry Neumann
- Edited by: Fred Allen
- Production company: Russell Productions
- Distributed by: State Rights
- Release date: August 1922 (U.S.)
- Running time: 5 reels
- Country: United States
- Language: Silent (English intertitles)

Bulldog Courage is a 1922 American silent Western film directed by Edward A. Kull, and starring George Larkin and Bessie Love. It was written by Larkin and his wife Ollie Kirkby, with a screenplay by Jeanne Poe. It was produced by Russell Productions and distributed by State Rights.

The film is preserved in the collection of the British Film Institute.

== Plot ==
Jimmy Brent, a college athlete and ward of his uncle John Morton, is sent to Wyoming by his uncle to seek out Bob Phillips, Morton's former rival for the hand of Mary Allen. Morton, who has nursed resentment for years, offers Brent $50,000 if he will find Phillips and "beat him up."

When Jimmy arrives in Wyoming, he falls in love with Gloria Phillips, Big Bob's daughter, and decides not to carry out his uncle's wishes. One of the Phillips' cowboys, Smokey Evans, who is secretly in love with Gloria and a member of a band of cattle rustlers, gives Phillips a note falsely implicating Brent as a rustler. Brent is sent away in disgrace and under suspicion.

Later, Brent meets and fights Phillips in a rough confrontation. Brent discovers the rustlers' hideout and after much fighting, they are turned over to the sheriff. Meanwhile, Smokey Evans attempts to kidnap Gloria, but Brent arrives in time to trail them and capture Evans after a fight among the cliffs. Big Bob Phillips learns of Brent's quest and that he has won his uncle's $50,000 reward, and the story ends with Gloria and Jimmy preparing for marriage.

== Cast ==
- George Larkin as Jimmy Brent
- Bessie Love as Gloria Phillips
- Albert MacQuarrie as John Morton
- Karl Silvera as Smokey Evans
- Frank Whitman as Big Bob Phillips
- Bill Patton as Sheriff Webber
- Barbara Tennant as Mary Allen

== Production ==
Filming took place in Oregon.

== Reception ==
Contemporary reviews were generally positive. Moving Picture World critic C. M. Inman wrote that the film "will interest and entertain and, cause some thrills," praising the "tense and very dramatic" action sequences. The review noted that the film was "well cast, with Bessie Love and George Larkin in the leading roles" and highlighted "some excellent horsemanship" and "high-class photography," concluding that "the picture is one that will appeal strongly to the average audience."

Although few contemporaneous reviews of the film exist today, Bessie Love considered this film as one of the first indicators of decline in her silent film career.
