= Carolyn Wells =

American writer (1862–1942)

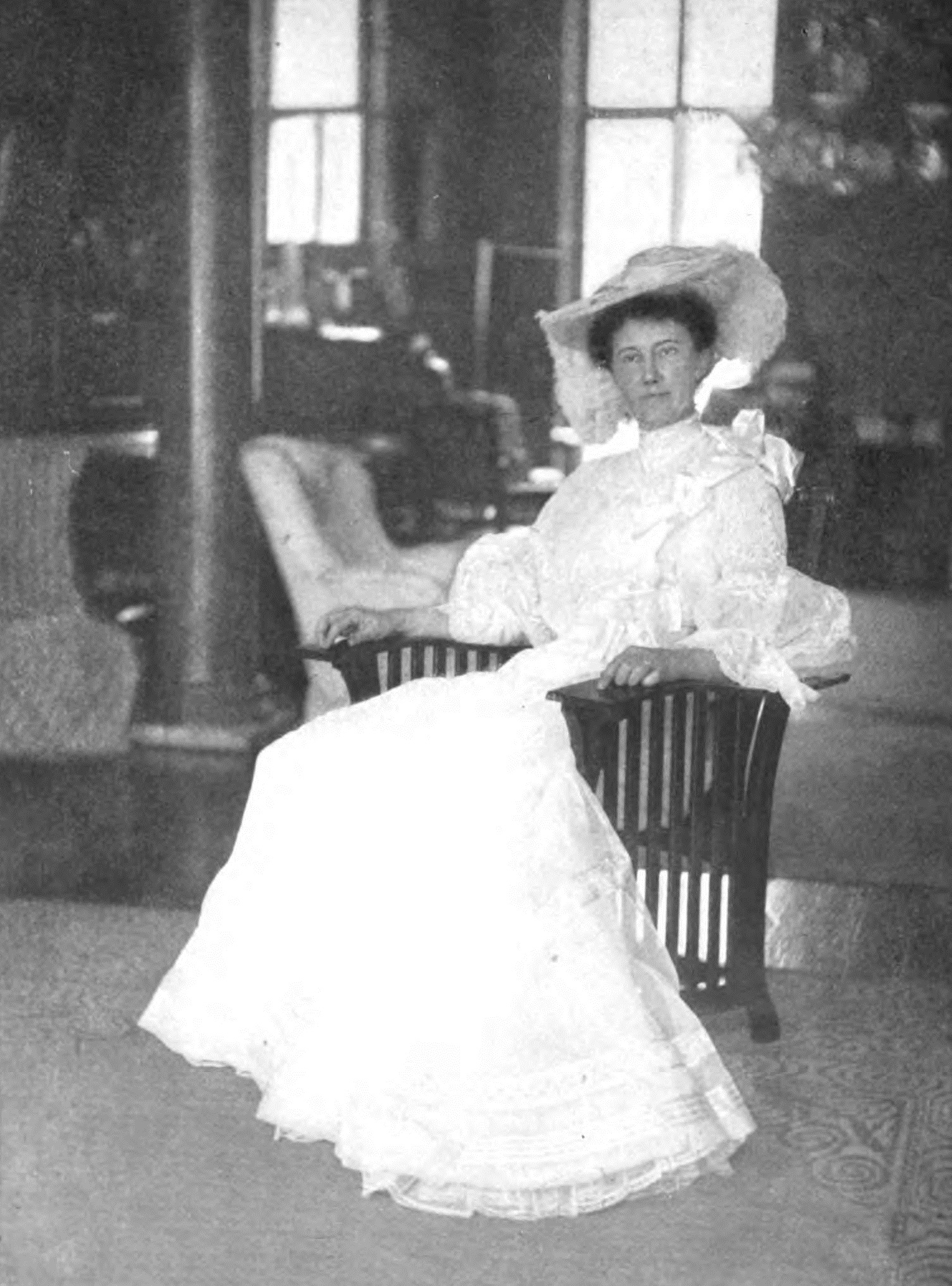
- Carolyn Wells in 1918
- Born: 18 June 1862; Rahway, New Jersey, U.S.
- Died: 26 March 1942 (aged 79); New York City, U.S.
- Occupations: Author, poet, librarian
- Spouse: Hadwin Houghton (m. 1918; died 1919)

Carolyn Wells (June 18, 1862 - March 26, 1942) was an American mystery author, poet, humorist, and children's writer. Over her career, she authored more than 170 books, spanning genres including detective fiction, poetry, humor, and young adult literature. Known for her prolific output, Wells was a prominent figure in early 20th-century American literature, particularly in the mystery genre, where she created the long-running Fleming Stone series. Despite her contemporary success, her work fell into obscurity after her death, a phenomenon explored in recent biographies.

== Early life and education ==
Born in Rahway, New Jersey, Wells was the daughter of William Edmund Wells, a businessman, and Anna Potter Wells (née Woodruff). She grew up in a middle-class family and demonstrated remarkable literacy from a young age, developing an early passion for reading, puzzles, and word games. Wells attended local schools in Rahway and supplemented her formal education with extensive self-directed reading.

After completing her schooling, Wells worked as a librarian at the Rahway Library Association, a position that allowed her to immerse herself in books and further hone her literary skills.

== Career ==
Wells began her writing career in the 1890s with puzzles, light verse, and nonsense literature. Her debut book, At the Sign of the Sphinx (1896), was a collection of literary charades. This was followed by The Jingle Book (1899), a volume of humorous verse, and The Story of Betty (1899), her first novel.

In the early years of her career (1896-1906), Wells focused on poetry, humor, and children's literature. She contributed nonsense verse and whimsical pieces to magazines and created illustrated newspaper series, such as Animal Alphabet (New York World) and Adventures of Lovely Lilly (New York Herald, 1906-1907).

A pivotal moment came when Wells heard Anna Katharine Green's mystery novel That Affair Next Door (1897) read aloud, inspiring her to shift to detective fiction. Her first mystery, The Clue (1909), introduced detective Fleming Stone and was included on the Haycraft-Queen Cornerstone list of essential mysteries. The Fleming Stone series comprised 61 novels, one of the longest-running detective series of its era.

Wells also created other detective characters, including Pennington Wise and Kenneth Carlisle, and edited anthologies such as A Nonsense Anthology (1910) and The Best American Mystery Stories of the Year (1931-1932). She wrote for newspapers and magazines, with her final series, Flossy Frills Helps Out, published posthumously in 1942.

== Personal life ==
In 1918, at age 55, Wells married Hadwin Houghton (1855-1919), a distant cousin of Houghton Mifflin founder Henry Oscar Houghton and a successful executive at Valentine & Company. Hadwin died in 1919, followed by Wells's mother two weeks later.

Wells was an avid book collector, amassing a renowned collection of Walt Whitman works, which she bequeathed to the Library of Congress upon her death.

She died on March 26, 1942, at the Flower Fifth Avenue Hospital in New York City. She suffered from a serious heart ailment in her later years.

== Legacy ==
Wells was one of the most successful female authors of her era, with best-selling mysteries and popular children's series like Patty Fairfield and Marjorie Maynard. Her puzzle-based plots foreshadowed aspects of the Golden Age of Detective Fiction.

Her work largely faded from prominence by the mid-20th century due to changing tastes and other factors. In 2024, Rebecca Rego Barry published The Vanishing of Carolyn Wells, the first full-length biography. In 2025, the Library of Congress hosted a program on women book collectors featuring Wells and her Whitman collection.

== Bibliography ==
=== Adult fiction ===
Before 1900

- At the Sign of the Sphinx (1896)
- The Jingle Book (1899)
- The Story of Betty (1899)

Fleming Stone mysteries

1. The Clue (1909)
2. The Gold Bag (1911)
3. A Chain of Evidence (1912)
4. The Maxwell Mystery (1913)
5. Anybody But Anne (1914)
6. The White Alley (1915)
7. The Curved Blades (1915)
8. The Mark of Cain (1917)
9. Vicky Van (1918)
10. The Diamond Pin (1919)
11. Raspberry Jam (1920)
12. The Mystery of the Sycamore (1921)
13. The Mystery Girl (1922)
14. Feathers Left Around (1923)
15. Spooky Hollow (1923)
16. The Furthest Fury (1924)
17. Prillilgirl (1924)
18. Anything But the Truth (1925)
19. The Daughter of the House (1925)
20. The Bronze Hand (1926)
21. The Red-Haired Girl (1926)
22. The Vanity Case (1926)
23. All at Sea (1927)
24. Where's Emily (1927)
25. The Crime in the Crypt (1928)
26. The Tannahill Tangle (1928)
27. The Tapestry Room Murder (1928)
28. Triple Murder (1929)
29. The Doomed Five (1930)
30. The Ghosts' High Noon (1930)
31. Horror House (1931)
32. The Umbrella Murder (1931)
33. Fuller's Earth (1932)
34. The Roll-Top Desk Mystery (1932)
35. The Broken O (1933) (also published as Honeymoon Murder)
36. The Clue of the Eyelash (1933)
37. The Master Murderer (1933)
38. Eyes in the Wall (1934)
39. The Visiting Villain (1934)
40. The Beautiful Derelict (1935)
41. For Goodness' Sake (1935)
42. The Wooden Indian (1935)
43. The Huddle (1936)
44. In the Tiger's Cage (1936)
45. Money Musk (1936)
46. Murder in the Bookshop (1936)
47. The Mystery of the Tarn (1937)
48. The Radio Studio Murder (1937)
49. Gilt Edged Guilt (1938)
50. The Killer (1938)
51. The Missing Link (1938)
52. Calling All Suspects (1939)
53. Crime Tears On (1939)
54. The Importance of Being Murdered (1939)
55. Crime Incarnate (1940)
56. Devil's Work (1940)
57. Murder On Parade (1940)
58. Murder Plus (1940)
59. The Black Night Murders (1941)
60. Murder at the Casino (1941)
61. Murder Will In (1942)
62. Who Killed Caldwell? (1942)

Alan Ford

1. The Bride of a Moment (1916)
2. Faulkner's Folly (1917)

Pennington Wise

1. The Room with the Tassels (1918)
2. The Man Who Fell Through the Earth (1919)
3. In the Onyx Lobby (1920)
4. The Come-Back (1921)
5. The Luminous Face (1921)
6. The Vanishing of Betty Varian (1922)
7. The Affair at Flower Acres (1923)
8. Wheels Within Wheels (1923)

Kenneth Carlisle

1. Sleeping Dogs (1929)
2. The Doorstep Murders (1930)
3. The Skeleton at the Feast (1931)

Other mysteries

- The Adventure of the Clothes-Line (1915, short story)
- More Lives Than One (1923)
- The Fourteenth Key (1924)
- The Moss Mystery (1924)
- Face Cards (1925)
- The Deep-Lake Mystery (1928)

Other novels

- Abeniki Caldwell: A Burlesque Historical Novel (1902)
- The Emily Emmins Papers (1907)
- The Lover's Baedeker and Guide to Arcady (1912)
- Ptomaine Street: A Tale of Warble Petticoat (1921)

Story collections

- The Eternal Feminine (1913)
- Girls and Gayety (1914)
- The Omnibus Fleming Stone (1923)

=== Children's fiction ===
Patty Fairfield series

1. Patty Fairfield (1901)
2. Patty at Home (1904)
3. Patty in the City (1905)
4. Patty's Summer Days (1906)
5. Patty in Paris (1907)
6. Patty's Friends (1908)
7. Patty's Pleasure Trip (1909)
8. Patty's Success (1910)
9. Patty's Motor Car (1911)
10. Patty's Butterfly Days (1912)
11. Patty's Social Season (1913)
12. Patty's Suitors (1914)
13. Patty's Romance (1915)
14. Patty's Fortune (1916)
15. Patty Blossom (1917)
16. Patty-Bride (1918)
17. Patty and Azalea (1919)

Marjorie Maynard series

1. Marjorie's Vacation (1907)
2. Marjorie's Busy Days (1908)
3. Marjorie's New Friend (1909)
4. Marjorie in Command (1910)
5. Marjorie's Maytime (1911)
6. Marjorie at Seacote (1912)

Dorrance Family series

1. The Dorrance Domain (1905)
2. Dorrance Doings (1906)

Two Little Women series

1. Two Little Women (1915)
2. Two Little Women and Treasure House (1916)
3. Two Little Women on a Holiday (1917)

Other children's novels

- Folly in Fairyland (1901)
- In the Reign of Queen Dick (1904)
- Dick and Dolly (1909)
- Dick and Dolly's Adventures (1910)
- The Story of Betty (1911)

Children's collections

- Mother Goose's Menagerie (1901)
- Children of Our Town (1902)

=== Nonfiction ===
- The Technique of the Mystery Story (1913)
- The Rest of My Life (1937) - Autobiography

=== Verse ===
- At the Sign of the Sphinx (1896)
- Idle Idyls (1900)
- Rubaiyat of a Motor Car (1906)
- A Whimsey Anthology (1906)
- The Re-Echo Club (1913)
- Diversions of the Re-Echo Club (1936)
- Ballade of Baker Street (1939)

=== Anthologies (as editor) ===
- A Parody Anthology (1904)
- A Satire Anthology (1905)
- A Whimsey Anthology (1906)
- A Vers de Société Anthology (1907)
- A Nonsense Anthology (1910)
- Such Nonsense!: An Anthology (1918)
- The Book of Humorous Verse (1920)
- The Book of Limericks (1925)
- The Best American Mystery Stories of the Year (1931, 1932)
