= The Devil's Trail (1919 film) =

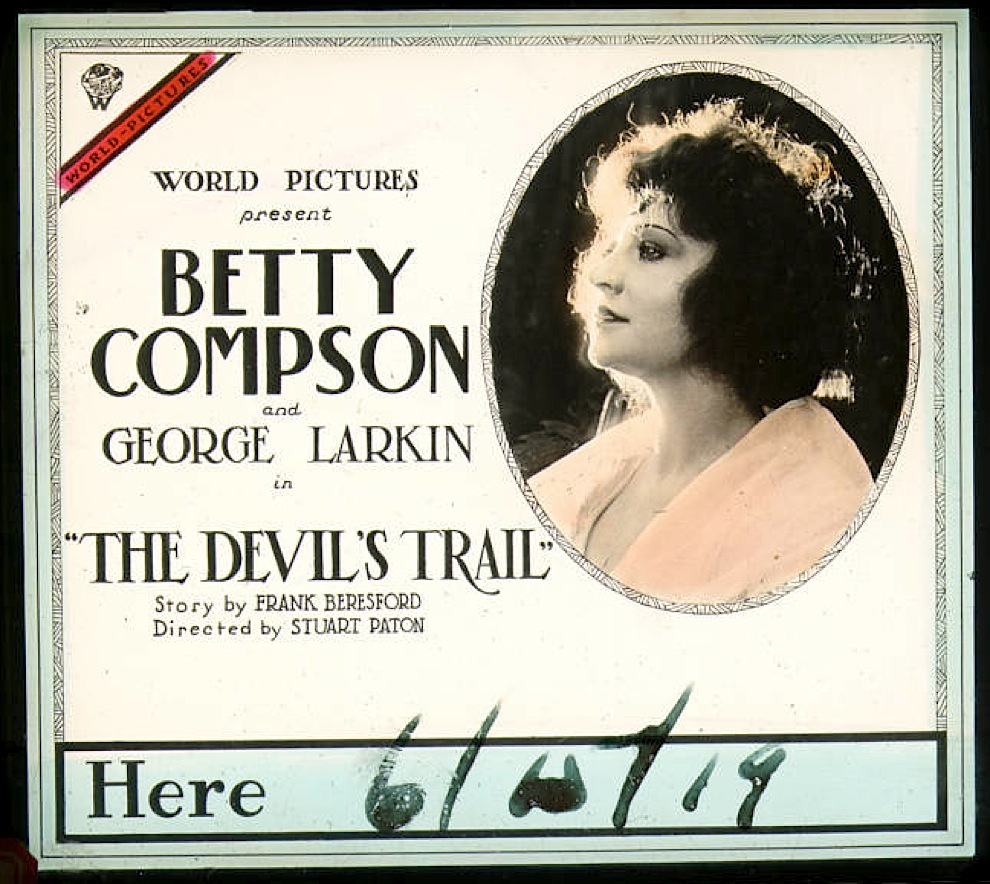
- Lantern slide
- Directed by: Stuart Paton
- Written by: Frank S. Beresford (story)
- Starring: Betty Compson
- Cinematography: William Thornley
- Production company: World Film Company
- Distributed by: World Film Company
- Release date: June 16, 1919
- Running time: 5 reels; 4,693 feet)
- Country: United States
- Language: Silent (English intertitles)

The Devil's Trail is a 1919 American silent drama film that is set in the woods of the Pacific Northwest. It was directed by Stuart Paton and stars Betty Compson.

== Plot ==
As described in a film magazine, Dibec, a whiskey smuggler who trades liquor to the Indians for blankets and furs, is being pursued by the Royal Northwest Mounted Police. Dubec stops at the post where Mrs. Delisle, wife of Sergeant Delisle, is alone with her daughter Nonette and her baby sister Julie. Dubec kills Mrs. Delisle and abducts Nonette.

Twelve years later, Julie is celebrating her 16th birthday. The men of the Royal Mounted attend this function, and while the dinner is in progress, Sergeant MacNair arrives. He at once falls in love with Julie, and she with him, and this love persists even though MacNair is to succeed Julie's father as commander of the post. The post is located at Chino Landing, and Sergeant Delisle has been unable to curb the lawless element brought by the gold rush.

After twelve years, Dubec has returned from the gold camp and is accompanied by Nonette. She is now a woman of the dance halls, and at first she succeeds in keeping her identity secret from her father. But when Delisle's life is endangered by the lawless element and Julie is kidnapped by Dubec, Nonette reveals her secret.

While MacNair, who has also been taken prisoner, fights to save Julie, Nonette brings her father and others to the scene. Dubec is captured and there is a happy reunion.

== Cast ==
- Betty Compson as Julie Delisle
- George Larkin as Sergeant MacNair
- William Quinn as 'Dutch' Vogel
- Fred Malatesta as Dubec
- Claire Du Brey as Dubec's Wife
- H. C. Carpenter
- Joseph J. Franz
- Howard Crampton
- Robert F. McGowan

unbilled

- Alberta Franklin

== Production ==
The Devil's Trail during production had the working title of Rose of the Border, which would have reflected the name of Compson's role, then named Rose.

== Preservation ==
The Devil's Trail is currently presumed lost. In February of 2021, the film was cited by the National Film Preservation Board on their Lost U.S. Silent Feature Films list.

== See also ==
- List of lost films
