= Stop at Nothing (1924 film) =

1924 silent film

- Directed by: Charles R. Seeling
- Produced by: Charles R. Seeling
- Starring: George Larkin; Ollie Kirby; Otto Metzetti
- Production company: Charles R. Seeling Productions
- Distributed by: Aywon Film Corporation
- Release date: February 1924
- Running time: 57 minutes
- Country: United States
- Languages: Silent; English intertitles

Stop at Nothing is a 1924 American silent drama film directed by Charles R. Seeling and starring George Larkin, Ollie Kirby and Otto Metzetti.

== Cast ==
- George Larkin as Jim Perry/Shadow Brice
- Ollie Kirby as Slick Sadie
- Otto Metzetti as Burly Walters
- Victor Metzetti as Jack Newton
- Kenneth Green as Secretary

== Bibliography ==
- Robert B. Connelly. The Silents: Silent Feature Films, 1910-36, Volume 40, Issue 2. December Press, 1998.
