= List of American films of 1925 =

More than 578 American feature films were released in the year 1925. All films on this list are in the Public Domain since 2021.

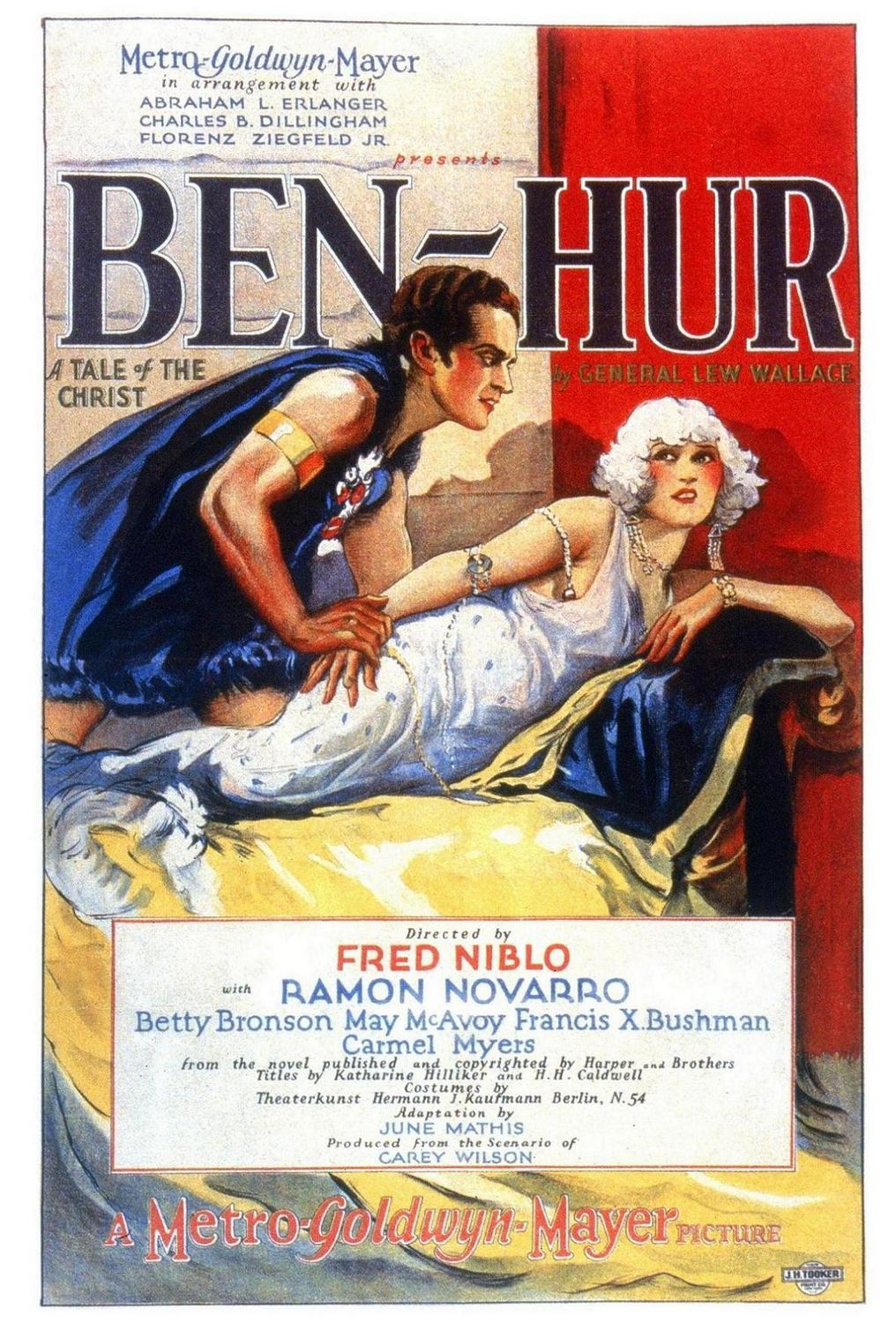
Ben Hur poster.

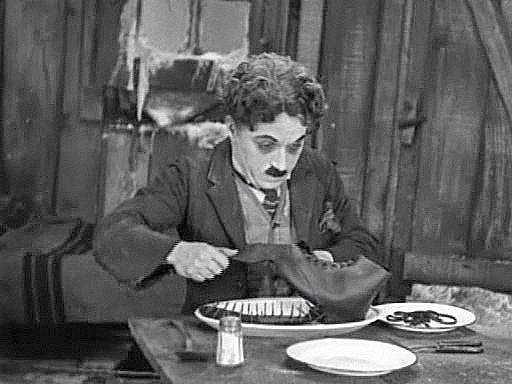
The Gold Rush with Charlie Chaplin.

== A ==
Title	Director	Featured Cast	Genre	Note
Accused	Dell Henderson	Marcella Daly, Eric Mayne, Charles Delaney	Drama	Independent
Ace of Clubs	J. P. McGowan	Al Hoxie, Peggy Montgomery, Jules Cowles	Western	Rayart
Ace of Spades	Henry MacRae	William Desmond, Mary McAllister	Adventure	Universal
Adventure	Victor Fleming	Tom Moore, Pauline Starke	Adventure	Paramount
The Adventurous Sex	Charles Giblyn	Clara Bow, Herbert Rawlinson	Romance	Independent
After Business Hours	Malcolm St. Clair	Elaine Hammerstein, Lou Tellegen, Phyllis Haver	Drama	Columbia
After Marriage	Norman Dawn	Margaret Livingston, George Fisher, Helen Lynch	Drama	Independent
The Air Mail	Irvin Willat	Warner Baxter, Billie Dove, Douglas Fairbanks Jr.	Drama	Paramount
Alias Mary Flynn	Ralph Ince	Evelyn Brent, Malcolm McGregor	Drama	FBO
All Around Frying Pan	David Kirkland	Fred Thomson, Clara Horton	Western	FBO
American Pluck	Richard Stanton	George Walsh, Wanda Hawley	Sports	Independent
The Ancient Highway	Irvin Willat	Jack Holt, Billie Dove, Montagu Love	Adventure	Paramount
The Ancient Mariner	Henry Otto, Chester Bennett	Clara Bow, Gladys Brockwell	Drama	Fox Film
Any Woman	Henry King	Alice Terry, Donald Reed	Drama	Paramount
Are Parents People?	Malcolm St. Clair	Betty Bronson, Florence Vidor	Comedy	Paramount
The Arizona Romeo	Edmund Moritimer	Buck Jones, Lucy Fox	Western comedy	Fox Film
As Man Desires	Irving Cummings	Viola Dana, Milton Sills	Adventure	First National
The Awful Truth	Paul Powell	Agnes Ayres, Warner Baxter	Drama	PDC

== B ==
Title	Director	Featured Cast	Genre	Note
Back to Life	Whitman Bennett	Patsy Ruth Miller, David Powell	Drama	Pathé Exchange
Bad Company	Edward H. Griffith	Madge Kennedy, Bigelow Cooper	Drama	Pathé Exchange
The Bad Lands	Dell Henderson	Harry Carey, Wilfred Lucas	Western	PDC
The Bandit's Baby	James P. Hogan	Fred Thomson, Helen Foster	Western	FBO
The Bandit Tamer	J. P. McGowan	Franklyn Farnum, Marguerite Clayton	Western	Independent
Baree, Son of Kazan	David Smith	Anita Stewart, Donald Keith	Adventure	Vitagraph
Barriers Burned Away	W. S. Van Dyke	Mabel Ballin, Frank Mayo	Drama	Pathé Exchange
Barriers of the Law	J. P. McGowan	Helen Holmes, William Desmond	Crime	Independent
Bashful Buccaneer	Harry Joe Brown	Reed Howes, Dorothy Dwan	Comedy	Rayart
The Beautiful City	Kenneth Webb	Richard Barthelmess, Dorothy Gish, William Powell	Crime	First National
Beauty and the Bad Man	William Worthington	Mabel Ballin, Forrest Stanley	Western	PDC
Before Midnight	John G. Adolfi	William Russell, Barbara Bedford	Drama	Independent
Beggar on Horseback	James Cruze	Edward Everett Horton, Esther Ralston	Comedy	Paramount
Below the Line	Herman C. Raymaker	John Harron, June Marlowe	Adeventure	Warner Bros.
Ben-Hur: A Tale of the Christ	Fred Niblo	Ramón Novarro, Francis X. Bushman, May McAvoy, Betty Bronson	Epic	MGM
The Best Bad Man	John G. Blystone	Tom Mix, Clara Bow	Western	Fox Film
The Best People	Sidney Olcott	Warner Baxter, Esther Ralston	Comedy	Paramount
Beyond the Border	Scott R. Dunlap	Harry Carey, Mildred Harris	Western	PDC
Big Pal	John G. Adolfi	William Russell, Julanne Johnston	Drama	Independent
The Big Parade	King Vidor	John Gilbert, Renée Adorée	War	MGM
The Big Stunt	Charles R. Seeling	Guinn "Big Boy" Williams, Kathleen Collins	Western	Independent
Billy the Kid	J. P. McGowan	Franklyn Farnum, Dorothy Wood	Western	Independent
Black Cyclone	Fred Jackman	Guinn "Big Boy" Williams, Kathleen Collins	Western	Pathé Exchange
Blood and Steel	J. P. McGowan	Helen Holmes, William Desmond	Western	Independent
The Bloodhound	William James Craft	Bob Custer, Mary Beth Milford	Western	FBO
Blue Blood	Scott R. Dunlap	George Walsh, Philo McCullough	Drama	Independent
Bobbed Hair	Alan Crosland	Marie Prevost, Louise Fazenda	Comedy	Warner Bros.
The Boomerang	Louis J. Gasnier	Anita Stewart, Bert Lytell	Comedy	Independent
Border Intrigue	J. P. McGowan	Franklyn Farnum, Dorothy Wood	Western	Independent
Border Justice	B. Reeves Eason	Bill Cody, Nola Luxford	Western	Independent
Border Vengeance	Harry S. Webb	Jack Perrin, Josephine Hill	Western	Rayart
Borrowed Finery	Oscar Apfel	Louise Lorraine, Ward Crane	Drama	Tiffany
Brand of Cowardice	John P. McCarthy	Bruce Gordon, Carmelita Geraghty, Harry Lonsdale	Western	Independent
Braveheart	Alan Hale	Rod La Rocque	Western	PDC
The Bridge of Sighs	Phil Rosen	Dorothy Mackaill, Creighton Hale	Drama	Warner Bros.
Bright Lights	Robert Z. Leonard	Charles Ray, Pauline Starke, Lilyan Tashman	Drama	MGM
A Broadway Butterfly	William Beaudine	Dorothy Devore, Louise Fazenda	Comedy	Warner Bros.
Broadway Lady	Wesley Ruggles	Evelyn Brent, Theodore von Eltz, Margerie Bonner	Drama	FBO
The Burning Trail	Arthur Rosson	William Desmond, Albert J. Smith	Western	Universal
The Business of Love	Irving Reis	Edward Everett Horton, Barbara Bedford, Zasu Pitts	Comedy	Independent
Bustin' Thru	Clifford Smith	Jack Hoxie, Helen Lynch	Western	Universal

== C ==
Title	Director	Featured Cast	Genre	Note
Cactus Trails	Harry S. Webb	Jack Perrin, Alma Rayford	Western	Independent
The Calgary Stampede	Herbert Blaché	Hoot Gibson, Virginia Brown Faire	Western	Universal
California Straight Ahead	Harry A. Pollard	Reginald Denny, Gertrude Olmstead	Sports	Universal
The Call of Courage	Clifford Smith	Art Acord, Olive Hasbrouck	Western	Universal
Camille of the Barbary Coast	Hugh Dierker	Mae Busch, Owen Moore	Drama	Independent
The Canvas Kisser	Duke Worne	Ashton Dearholt, Ruth Dwyer, Edward Cecil	Sports	Independent
The Champion of Lost Causes	Chester Bennett	Edmund Lowe, Barbara Bedford	Drama	Fox Film
Charley's Aunt	Scott Sidney	Syd Chaplin, Ethel Shannon	Comedy	Columbia
The Charmer	Sidney Olcott	Pola Negri, Robert Frazer	Drama	Paramount
Cheaper to Marry	Robert Z. Leonard	Conrad Nagel, Lewis Stone, Marguerite De La Motte	Drama	MGM
Chickie	John Francis Dillon	Dorothy Mackaill, John Bowers, Hobart Bosworth	Drama	First National
Children of the Whirlwind	Whitman Bennett	Lionel Barrymore, Marguerite De La Motte	Drama	Independent
The Circle	Frank Borzage	Eleanor Boardman, Malcolm McGregor	Romance Drama	MGM
The Circus Cyclone	Albert S. Rogell	Art Acord, Cesare Gravina	Western	Universal
The Clash of the Wolves	Noel M. Smith	Charles Farrell, June Marlowe	Adventure	Warner Bros.
Classified	Alfred Santell	Corinne Griffith, Jack Mulhall	Drama	First National
Clothes Make the Pirate	Maurice Tourneur	Leon Errol, Dorothy Gish, Nita Naldi	Historical comedy	First National
The Cloud Rider	Bruce M. Mitchell	Al Wilson, Virginia Lee Corbin	Adventure	FBO
The Coast of Folly	Allan Dwan	Gloria Swanson, Alec B. Francis	Drama	Paramount
Cobra	Joseph Henabery	Rudolph Valentino, Nita Naldi	Drama	Paramount
Code of the West	William K. Howard	Owen Moore, Constance Bennett, Mabel Ballin	Western	Paramount
The Coming of Amos	Paul Sloane	Rod La Rocque, Jetta Goudal, Noah Beery	Romance	PDC
Coming Through	A. Edward Sutherland	Thomas Meighan, Wallace Beery and Lila Lee	Drama	Paramount
Compromise	Alan Crosland	Irene Rich, Clive Brook, Louise Fazenda	Drama	Warner Bros.
Confessions of a Queen	Victor Sjostrom	Alice Terry, Lewis Stone	Drama	MGM
Contraband	Alan Crosland	Lois Wilson, Noah Beery	Drama	Paramount
Counsel for the Defense	Burton L. King	Jay Hunt, Betty Compson, House Peters	Drama	Independent
The Cowboy Musketeer	Robert De Lacey	Tom Tyler, Frankie Darro	Western	FBO
Crack o' Dawn	Albert S. Rogell	Reed Howes, Henry A. Barrows	Adventure	Rayart
The Crackerjack	Charles Hines	Johnny Hines, Sigrid Holmquist	Comedy	Independent
The Crimson Runner	Tom Forman	Priscilla Dean, Bernard Siegel, Alan Hale	Drama	PDC
The Crowded Hour	E. Mason Hopper	Bebe Daniels, Kenneth Harlan	Drama	Paramount
Cyclone Cavalier	Albert S. Rogell	Reed Howes, Carmelita Geraghty	Western	Rayart

== D ==
Title	Director	Featured Cast	Genre	Note
Daddy's Gone A-Hunting	Frank Borzage	Alice Joyce, Percy Marmont	Drama	MGM
The Dancers	Emmett J. Flynn	George O'Brien, Alma Rubens	Drama	Fox Film
The Danger Signal	Erle C. Kenton	Jane Novak, Dorothy Revier	Drama	Columbia
Dangerous Fists	Harry S. Webb	Jack Perrin, Nelson McDowell	Action	Rayart
Dangerous Innocence	William A. Seiter	Laura La Plante, Eugene O'Brien	Romantic comedy	Universal
Dangerous Odds	William James Craft	Bill Cody, Eileen Sedgwick, Milton J. Fahrney	Western	Independent
Daring Days	John B. O'Brien	Josie Sedgwick, Edward Hearn	Western	Universal
The Dark Angel	George Fitzmaurice	Ronald Colman, Vilma Bánky	Drama	First National
Daughters Who Pay	George Terwilliger	Marguerite De La Motte, John Bowers	Drama	Independent
Déclassé	Robert G. Vignola	Corinne Griffith, Clive Brook	Drama	First National
Defend Yourself	Dell Henderson	Marcella Daly, Robert Ellis, Sheldon Lewis	Drama	Independent
The Demon Rider	Paul Hurst	Ken Maynard, Alma Rayford	Western	Independent
The Denial	Hobart Henley	Claire Windsor, Bert Roach	Drama	MGM
The Desert Demon	Richard Thorpe	Jay Wilsey, Betty Morrissey, Harry Todd	Western	Independent
The Desert Flower	Irving Cummings	Colleen Moore, Lloyd Hughes	Drama	First National
The Desert's Price	W. S. Van Dyke	Buck Jones, Florence Gilbert	Western	Fox Film
A Desperate Chance	J. P. McGowan	Bob Reeves, Slim Whitaker	Western	Rayart
The Devil's Cargo	Victor Fleming	Wallace Beery, Pauline Starke	Drama	Paramount
Dick Turpin	John G. Blystone	Tom Mix, Philo McCullough	Historical	Fox Film
Dollar Down	Tod Browning	Ruth Roland, Henry B. Walthall	Drama	Independent
Don Dare Devil	Clifford Smith	Jack Hoxie, William Welsh	Western	Universal
Don Q, Son of Zorro	Donald Crisp	Douglas Fairbanks, Mary Astor, Warner Oland	Swashbuckler	United Artists
Don't	Alfred J. Goulding	Sally O'Neil, Bert Roach	Comedy	MGM
Double Action Daniels	Richard Thorpe	Jay Wilsey, D'Arcy Corrigan, Lafe McKee	Western	Independent
Double-Fisted	Harry S. Webb	Jack Perrin, Lew Meehan	Western	Rayart
Down Upon the Suwanee River	Lem F. Kennedy	Charles Emmett Mack, Mary Thurman, Arthur Donaldson	Drama	Independent
The Dressmaker from Paris	Paul Bern	Leatrice Joy, Ernest Torrence	Romantic comedy	Paramount
The Drug Store Cowboy	Park Frame	Franklyn Farnum, Jean Arthur	Action	Independent
Drusilla with a Million	F. Harmon Weight	Mary Carr, Priscilla Bonner, Kenneth Harlan	Drama	FBO
Duped	J. P. McGowan	William Desmond, Helen Holmes	Western	Independent
Durand of the Bad Lands	Lynn Reynolds	Buck Jones, Marian Nixon	Western	Fox Film

== E ==
Title	Director	Featured Cast	Genre	Note
The Eagle	Clarence Brown	Rudolph Valentino	Historical	United Artists
The Early Bird	Charles Hines	Johnny Hines, Sigrid Holmquist, Wyndham Standing	Comedy	Independent
East Lynne	Emmett J. Flynn	Alma Rubens, Edmund Lowe, Marjorie Daw	Drama	Fox Film
East of Suez	Raoul Walsh	Pola Negri, Edmund Lowe	Drama	Paramount
Easy Money	Al Rogell	Cullen Landis, Mildred Harris	Adventure	Rayart
The Empty Saddle	Harry S. Webb	Pete Morrison, Lew Meehan	Western	Vitagraph
An Enemy of Men	Frank R. Strayer	Dorothy Revier, Cullen Landis	Drama	Columbia
Enticement	George Archainbaud	Mary Astor, Clive Brook	Drama	First National
Ermine and Rhinestones	Burton L. King	Edna Murphy, Niles Welch, Ruth Stonehouse	Drama	Independent
The Everlasting Whisper	John G. Blystone	Tom Mix, Alice Calhoun	Western	Fox Film
Eve's Lover	Roy Del Ruth	Irene Rich, Bert Lytell, Clara Bow	Drama	Warner Bros.
Eve's Secret	Clarence G. Badger	Betty Compson, Jack Holt	Romantic comedy	Paramount
Every Man's Wife	Maurice Elvey	Elaine Hammerstein, Herbert Rawlinson	Drama	Fox Film
Exchange of Wives	Hobart Henley	Eleanor Boardman, Renée Adorée	Drama	MGM
Excuse Me	Alfred J. Goulding	Conrad Nagel, Norma Shearer, Renée Adorée	Comedy	MGM

== F ==
Title	Director	Featured Cast	Genre	Note
Faint Perfume	Louis J. Gasnier	Seena Owen, William Powell	Drama	Independent
Fair Play	Frank Hall Crane	Edith Thornton, Gaston Glass, Betty Francisco	Drama	Independent
Fangs of Fate	Horace B. Carpenter	Bill Patton, William Bertram	Western	Chesterfield
Fast Fightin'	Richard Thorpe	Buddy Roosevelt, Joe Rickson	Western	Independent
The Fate of a Flirt	Frank R. Strayer	Dorothy Revier, Forrest Stanley	Romantic comedy	Columbia
Fear-Bound	William Nigh	Marjorie Daw, Niles Welch	Western	Vitagraph
The Fear Fighter	Albert S. Rogell	Billy Sullivan, Ruth Dwyer	Comedy	Rayart
The Fearless Lover	Scott R. Dunlap	William Fairbanks, Eva Novak	Drama	Columbia
Fifth Avenue Models	Svend Gade	Mary Philbin, Norman Kerry	Drama	Universal
Fifty-Fifty	Henri Diamant-Berger	Hope Hampton, Lionel Barrymore, Louise Glaum	Drama	Independent
A Fight to the Finish	B. Reeves Eason	William Fairbanks, Phyllis Haver	Drama	Columbia
The Fighting Demon	Arthur Rosson	Richard Talmadge, Lorraine Eason	Action	FBO
Fighting Fate	Albert S. Rogell	Billy Sullivan, Tom McGuire	Sports	Rayart
The Fighting Heart	John Ford	George O'Brien, Billie Dove	Drama	Fox Film
Fighting Luck	J. P. McGowan	Bob Reeves, Lew Meehan	Western	Rayart
The Fighting Cub	Paul Hurst	Wesley Barry, Mildred Harris, Stuart Holmes	Drama	Independent
The Fighting Smile	Jay Marchant	Bill Cody, Jean Arthur	Western	Independent
Fighting the Flames	B. Reeves Eason	William Haines, Dorothy Devore	Drama	Columbia
Fighting Youth	B. Reeves Eason	William Fairbanks, Pauline Garon	Action	Columbia
Fine Clothes	John M. Stahl	Lewis Stone, Percy Marmont, Alma Rubens	Comedy	First National
Flaming Love	Victor Schertzinger	Eugene O'Brien, Mae Busch	Western	First National
Flaming Waters	F. Harmon Weight	Malcolm McGregor, Pauline Garon	Action	FBO
Flashing Steeds	Horace B. Carpenter	Bill Patton, Merrill McCormick	Western	Chesterfield
Flattery	Tom Forman	John Bowers, Marguerite De La Motte, Alan Hale	Drama	Independent
Flower of Night	Paul Bern	Pola Negri, Warner Oland	Drama	Paramount
Flying Hoofs	Clifford S. Smith	Jack Hoxie, Bartlett Carré	Western	Universal
Folly of Youth	Paul Hurst	Gaston Glass, Noah Beery, Gertrude Astor	Crime	Independent
A Fool and His Money	Erle C. Kenton	Madge Bellamy, William Haines	Drama	Columbia
The Fool	Harry F. Millarde	Edmund Lowe, Raymond Bloomer	Drama	Fox Film
Forbidden Cargo	Tom Buckingham	Evelyn Brent, Robert Ellis	Drama	FBO
Forty Winks	Paul Iribe, Frank Urson	Raymond Griffith, Theodore Roberts	Comedy	Paramount
The Four from Nowhere	Francis Ford	Peggy O'Day, Philip Ford	Adventure	Independent
Free to Love	Frank O'Connor	Clara Bow, Donald Keith	Drama	Independent
Friendly Enemies	George Melford	Jack Mulhall, Virginia Brown Faire	Comedy	PDC
The Freshman	Fred C. Newmeyer, Sam Taylor	Harold Lloyd	Comedy	Pathé Exchange
The Fugitive	Ben F. Wilson	Wilbur McGaugh, Ruth Stonehouse, Helene Rosson	Western	Arrow
Full Speed	Richard Thorpe	Jay Wilsey, Slim Whitaker	Western	Independent

== G ==
Title	Director	Featured Cast	Genre	Note
Galloping On	Richard Thorpe	Hal Taliaferro, Slim Whitaker	Western	Independent
Galloping Vengeance	William James Craft	Bob Custer, Mary Beth Milford	Western	FBO
The Gambling Fool	J. P. McGowan	Franklyn Farnum, Otto Meyer	Western	Independent
A Gentleman Roughneck	Grover Jones	Frank Merrill, Virginia Warwick, Jack Richardson	Action	Independent
Getting 'Em Right	Jack Harvey	George Larkin, Milburn Morante	Action	Rayart
The Girl of Gold	John Ince	Florence Vidor, Malcolm McGregor	Drama	PDC
The Girl on the Stairs	William Worthington	Patsy Ruth Miller, Frances Raymond	Mystery	PDC
The Girl Who Wouldn't Work	Marcel De Sano	Lionel Barrymore, Marguerite De La Motte	Drama	Independent
Go Straight	Frank O'Connor	Owen Moore, Mary Carr	Drama	Independent
Go West	Buster Keaton	Buster Keaton	Comedy, Western	MGM
Goat Getter	Albert S. Rogell	Billy Sullivan, Kathleen Myers	Action	Rayart
Going the Limit	Duke Worne	Ashton Dearholt, Ruth Dwyer	Drama	Independent
Gold and Grit	Richard Thorpe	Buddy Roosevelt, William H. Turner, Wilbur Mack	Western	Independent
Gold and the Girl	Edmund Mortimer	Buck Jones, Elinor Fair	Western	Fox Film
The Gold Rush	Charlie Chaplin	Charlie Chaplin, Georgia Hale	Comedy adventure	United Artists
The Golden Bed	Cecil B. DeMille	Lillian Rich, Henry B. Walthall	Drama	Paramount
The Golden Cocoon	Millard Webb	Huntley Gordon, Helene Chadwick	Drama	Warner Bros.
The Golden Princess	Clarence G. Badger	Betty Bronson, Neil Hamilton, Phyllis Haver	Western	Paramount
The Golden Strain	Victor Schertzinger	Hobart Bosworth, Kenneth Harlan, Madge Bellamy	Western	Fox Film
The Goose Hangs High	James Cruze	Constance Bennett, Myrtle Stedman, Esther Ralston	Comedy	Paramount
The Goose Woman	Clarence Brown	Louise Dresser, Jack Pickford	Drama	Universal
Grass	Merian C. Cooper, Ernest B. Schoedsack	Merian C. Cooper, Ernest B. Schoedsack, Marguerite Harrison	Documentary	Paramount
Graustark	Dimitri Buchowetzki	Norma Talmadge, Eugene O'Brien	Romance	First National
The Great Circus Mystery	Jay Marchant	Joe Bonomo, Louise Lorraine	Adventure	Universal
The Great Divide	Reginald Barker	Alice Terry, Conway Tearle, Wallace Beery	Drama	MGM
The Great Jewel Robbery	John Ince	Herbert Rawlinson, Grace Darmond, Marcella Daly	Thriller	Independent
The Great Love	Marshall Neilan	Robert Agnew, Viola Dana, ZaSu Pitts	Comedy	MGM
The Great Sensation	Jay Marchant	William Fairbanks, Pauline Garon	Drama	Columbia
Greater Than a Crown	Roy William Neill	Edmund Lowe, Dolores Costello	Romance	Fox Film
Grounds for Divorce	Paul Bern	Florence Vidor, Matt Moore	Comedy	Paramount

== H ==
Title	Director	Featured Cast	Genre	Note
The Half-Way Girl	John Francis Dillon	Doris Kenyon, Lloyd Hughes	Drama	First National
The Handsome Brute	Robert Eddy	William Fairbanks, Virginia Lee Corbin	Drama	Columbia
The Happy Warrior	J. Stuart Blackton	Malcolm McGregor, Alice Calhoun	Drama	Vitagraph
Havoc	Rowland V. Lee	Madge Bellamy, George O'Brien	Drama	Fox Film
He Who Laughs Last	Jack Nelson	Kenneth MacDonald, David Torrence, Gino Corrado	Drama	Independent
Head Winds	Herbert Blaché	House Peters, Patsy Ruth Miller	Drama	Universal
Heads Up	Harry Garson	Maurice "Lefty" Flynn, Kathleen Myers	Comedy	FBO
Headlines	Edward H. Griffith	Alice Joyce, Malcolm McGregor	Crime	Pathé Exchange
Heart of a Siren	Phil Rosen	Barbara La Marr, Conway Tearle	Romance	First National
Heartless Husbands	Bertram Bracken	John T. Prince, Gloria Grey, Vola Vale	Drama	Independent
Hearts and Spurs	W. S. Van Dyke	Buck Jones, Carole Lombard	Western	Fox Film
Heir-Loons	Grover Jones	Wallace MacDonald, Edith Roberts	Comedy	Pathé Exchange
Hell's Highroad	Rupert Julian	Leatrice Joy, Edmund Burns	Drama	PDC
Her Husband's Secret	Frank Lloyd	Antonio Moreno, Patsy Ruth Miller, Ruth Clifford	Drama	First National
Her Market Value	Paul Powell	Agnes Ayres, Anders Randolf, Hedda Hopper	Drama	PDC
Her Sister from Paris	Sidney Franklin	Constance Talmadge, Ronald Colman	Comedy	First National
Hidden Loot	Robert N. Bradbury	Jack Hoxie, Olive Hasbrouck	Western	Universal
High and Handsome	Harry Garson	Maurice "Lefty" Flynn, Ethel Shannon	Drama	FBO
His Buddy's Wife	Tom Terriss	Glenn Hunter, Edna Murphy	Drama	Independent
His Majesty, Bunker Bean	Harry Beaumont	Matt Moore, Dorothy Devore	Comedy	Warner Bros.
His Master's Voice	Renaud Hoffman	George Hackathorne, Marjorie Daw, Mary Carr	War	Gotham
His People	Edward Sloman	Rudolph Schildkraut, Rosa Rosanova	Drama	Universal
His Secretary	Hobart Henley	Norma Shearer, Lew Cody	Comedy	MGM
His Supreme Moment	George Fitzmaurice	Blanche Sweet, Ronald Colman	Drama	First National
Hogan's Alley	Roy Del Ruth	Monte Blue, Patsy Ruth Miller	Comedy	Warner Bros.
The Home Maker	King Baggot	Alice Joyce, Clive Brook	Drama	Universal
How Baxter Butted In	William Beaudine	Dorothy Devore, Matt Moore	Comedy	Warner Bros.
The Human Tornado	Ben F. Wilson	Yakima Canutt, Bert Sprotte	Western	FBO
The Hunted Woman	Jack Conway	Seena Owen, Earl Schenck	Drama	Fox Film
The Hurricane Horseman	Robert Eddy	Hal Taliaferro, Jean Arthur	Western	Independent
The Hurricane Kid	Edward Sedgwick	Hoot Gibson, Marian Nixon	Western	Universal

== I ==
Title	Director	Featured Cast	Genre	Note
I Want My Man	Lambert Hillyer	Doris Kenyon, Milton Sills, Phyllis Haver	Romance	First National
If I Marry Again	John Francis Dillon	Doris Kenyon, Lloyd Hughes	Drama	First National
If Marriage Fails	John Ince	Jacqueline Logan, Clive Brook, Jean Hersholt	Drama	FBO
I'll Show You the Town	Harry A. Pollard	Reginald Denny, Marian Nixon	Comedy	Universal
In the Name of Love	Howard Higgin	Ricardo Cortez, Greta Nissen, Wallace Beery	Comedy	Paramount
Infatuation	Irving Cummings	Corinne Griffith, Percy Marmont	Drama	First National
Introduce Me	George J. Crone	Douglas MacLean, Anne Cornwall	Comedy	Independent
Irish Luck	Victor Heerman	Thomas Meighan, Lois Wilson	Comedy drama	Paramount
The Isle of Hope	Jack Nelson	Richard Talmadge, Helen Ferguson	Action	FBO

== J ==
Title	Director	Featured Cast	Genre	Note
Jimmie's Millions	James P. Hogan	Richard Talmadge, Betty Francisco	Adventure	FBO
Joanna	Edwin Carewe	Dorothy Mackaill, Paul Nicholson, Dolores del Río	Comedy	First National
Just a Woman	Irving Cummings	Claire Windsor, Conway Tearle	Drama	First National
Justice of the Far North	Norman Dawn	Arthur Jasmine, Marcia Manon	Adventure	Columbia

== K ==
Title	Director	Featured Cast	Genre	Note
Keep Smiling	Albert Austin	Monty Banks, Robert Edeson, Anne Cornwall	Comedy	Independent
The Keeper of the Bees	James Leo Meehan	Robert Frazer, Clara Bow	Drama	FBO
Kentucky Pride	John Ford	Henry B. Walthall, Gertrude Astor	Drama	Fox Film
The King on Main Street	Monta Bell	Bessie Love, Adolphe Menjou	Romantic comedy	Paramount
The Kiss Barrier	Roy William Neill	Edmund Lowe, Claire Adams	Romance	Fox Film
A Kiss for Cinderella	Herbert Brenon	Betty Bronson, Tom Moore	Fantasy	Paramount
A Kiss in the Dark	Frank Tuttle	Adolphe Menjou, Aileen Pringle, Lillian Rich	Comedy	Paramount
Kiss Me Again	Ernst Lubitsch	Marie Prevost, Monte Blue	Romantic comedy	Warner Bros.
The Knockout Kid	Albert S. Rogell	Jack Perrin, Eva Thatcher	Western	Rayart
The Knockout	Lambert Hillyer	Milton Sills, Harry Cording	Sports	First National

== L ==
Title	Director	Featured Cast	Genre	Note
The Lady	Frank Borzage	Norma Talmadge, Wallace MacDonald	Drama	First National
Lady of the Night	Monta Bell	Norma Shearer, Malcolm McGregor	Romance	MGM
Lady Robinhood	Ralph Ince	Evelyn Brent, Robert Ellis	Drama	FBO
Lady Windermere's Fan	Ernst Lubitsch	Ronald Colman, May McAvoy	Comedy	Warner Bros.
The Lady Who Lied	Edwin Carewe	Virginia Valli, Nita Naldi, Lewis Stone	Drama	First National
The Last Edition	Emory Johnson	Ralph Lewis, Lila Leslie, Ray Hallor	Drama	FBO
The Lawful Cheater	Frank O'Connor	Clara Bow, Raymond McKee	Crime	Independent
Lazybones	Frank Borzage	Madge Bellamy, Buck Jones, ZaSu Pitts	Romance	Fox Film
Learning to Love	Sidney Franklin	Constance Talmadge, Antonio Moreno	Romance	First National
Lena Rivers	Whitman Bennett	Gladys Hulette, Earle Williams	Drama	Independent
Let 'er Buck	Edward Sedgwick	Hoot Gibson, Marian Nixon	Western	Universal
Let Women Alone	Paul Powell	Pat O'Malley, Wanda Hawley, Wallace Beery	Comedy	PDC
Let's Go, Gallagher	Robert De Lacey, James Gruen	Tom Tyler, Olin Francis	Western	FBO
Lightnin'	John Ford	Jay Hunt, Wallace MacDonald	Comedy	Fox Film
Lights of Old Broadway	Monta Bell	Marion Davies, Conrad Nagel	Drama	MGM
The Light of Western Stars	William K. Howard	Jack Holt, Billie Dove, Noah Beery	Western	Paramount
Lilies of the Streets	Joseph Levering	Virginia Lee Corbin, Wheeler Oakman	Drama	FBO
The Limited Mail	George Hill	Monte Blue, Vera Reynolds	Drama	Warner Bros.
Little Annie Rooney	William Beaudine	Mary Pickford, William Haines	Drama	United Artists
The Little French Girl	Herbert Brenon	Mary Brian, Maurice de Canonge	Drama	Paramount
A Little Girl in a Big City	Burton L. King	Gladys Walton, Niles Welch, Mary Thurman	Drama	Gotham
The Live Wire	Charles Hines	Johnny Hines, Edmund Breese	Comedy	First National
Locked Doors	William C. deMille	Betty Compson, Theodore von Eltz	Romance	Paramount
Lord Jim	Victor Fleming	Percy Marmont, Shirley Mason, Noah Beery Sr.	Adventure	Paramount
Lorraine of the Lions	Edward Sedgwick	Norman Kerry, Patsy Ruth Miller	Adventure	Universal
Lost: A Wife	William C. deMille	Adolphe Menjou, Greta Nissen	Comedy	Paramount
The Lost Chord	Wilfred Noy	David Powell, Alice Lake	Drama	Independent
The Lost Express	J. P. McGowan	Helen Holmes, Jack Mower	Mystery	Rayart
The Lost World	Harry Hoyt	Bessie Love, Wallace Beery.	Fantasy, Adventure	First National
The Love Gamble	Edward LeSaint	Lillian Rich, Robert Frazer, Pauline Garon	Drama	Independent
The Love Hour	Herman C. Raymaker	Huntley Gordon, Louise Fazenda	Drama	Vitagraph
Lovers in Quarantine	Frank Tuttle	Bebe Daniels, Alfred Lunt	Comedy	Paramount
Lover's Island	Henri Diamant-Berger	Hope Hampton, James Kirkwood, Louis Wolheim	Drama	Pathe Exchange
A Lover's Oath	Ferdinand P. Earle	Ramon Novarro, Kathleen Key	Romance	Independent
The Lucky Devil	Frank Tuttle	Richard Dix, Esther Ralston	Comedy drama	Paramount
The Lucky Horseshoe	John G. Blystone	Tom Mix, Billie Dove	Western	Fox Film
The Lure of the Track	J.P. McGowan	Sheldon Lewis, Macklyn Arbuckle, Dot Farley	Drama	Independent
The Lure of the Wild	Frank R. Strayer	Jane Novak, Alan Roscoe	Thriller	Columbia
Lying Wives	Ivan Abramson	Clara Kimball Young, Richard Bennett, Madge Kennedy	Drama	Independent

== M ==
Title	Director	Featured Cast	Genre	Note
The Mad Dancer	Burton L. King	Ann Pennington, Johnnie Walker, Coit Albertson	Drama	Independent
The Mad Marriage	Frank P. Donovan	Rosemary Davies, Maurice Costello	Drama	Independent
The Mad Whirl	William A. Seiter	May McAvoy, Jack Mulhall	Drama	Universal
Madame Behave	Scott Sidney	Julian Eltinge, Ann Pennington	Comedy	PDC
Madame Sans-Gêne	Léonce Perret	Gloria Swanson, Madeleine Guitty, Warwick Ward	Historical romance	Paramount
Makers of Men	Forrest Sheldon	Kenneth MacDonald, Clara Horton, Ethan Laidlaw	War	Independent
The Making of O'Malley	Lambert Hillyer	Milton Sills, Dorothy Mackaill	Drama	First National
Man and Maid	Victor Schertzinger	Lew Cody, Renée Adorée	Drama	MGM
The Man from Red Gulch	Edmund Mortimer	Harry Carey, Harriet Hammond	Western	PDC
The Man in Blue	Edward Laemmle	Herbert Rawlinson, Madge Bellamy	Drama	Universal
A Man Must Live	Paul Sloane	Richard Dix, Jacqueline Logan	Adventure	Paramount
A Man of Iron	Whitman Bennett	Lionel Barrymore, Mildred Harris	Drama	Independent
A Man of Nerve	Louis Chaudet	Bob Custer, Jean Arthur	Western	FBO
The Man on the Box	Charles Reisner	Sydney Chaplin, Alice Calhoun	Comedy	Warner Bros.
The Man Who Found Himself	Alfred E. Green	Thomas Meighan, Virginia Valli, Frank Morgan	Drama	Paramount
The Man Without a Conscience	James Flood	Willard Louis, Irene Rich, June Marlowe	Drama	Warner Bros.
The Man Without a Country	Rowland V. Lee	Edward Hearn, Pauline Starke	Drama	Fox Film
Manhattan Madness	John McDermott	Jack Dempsey, Estelle Taylor	Drama	Independent
The Manicure Girl	Frank Tuttle	Bebe Daniels, Edmund Burns	Romance	Paramount
The Mansion of Aching Hearts	James P. Hogan	Ethel Clayton, Barbara Bedford, Priscilla Bonner	Drama	Independent
Marriage in Transit	Roy William Neill	Edmund Lowe, Carole Lombard	Comedy	Fox Film
The Marriage Whirl	Alfred Santell	Corinne Griffith, Kenneth Harlan	Drama	First National
Marry Me	James Cruze	Florence Vidor, Edward Everett Horton	Comedy	Paramount
The Masked Bride	Christy Cabanne	Mae Murray, Francis X. Bushman	Romance	MGM
The Meddler	Arthur Rosson	William Desmond, Claire Anderson	Western	Universal
Men and Women	William C. deMille	Richard Dix, Claire Adams	Drama	Paramount
The Merry Widow	Erich von Stroheim	Mae Murray, John Gilbert, Roy D'Arcy	Comedy	MGM
The Midnight Flyer	Tom Forman	Cullen Landis, Dorothy Devore	Drama	FBO
The Midnight Girl	Wilfred Noy	Lila Lee, Bela Lugosi	Drama	Independent
Midnight Molly	Lloyd Ingraham	Evelyn Brent, Bruce Gordon	Drama	FBO
The Midshipman	Christy Cabanne	Ramon Novarro, Harriet Hammond	Romance	MGM
The Million Dollar Handicap	Scott Sidney	Edmund Burns, Ralph Lewis	Comedy	PDC
Miss Bluebeard	Frank Tuttle	Bebe Daniels, Robert Frazer	Comedy	Paramount
Mistaken Orders	J. P. McGowan	Helen Holmes, Jack Perrin	Action	Rayart
Moccasins	Robert N. Bradbury	Bill Cody, Peggy O'Day	Western	Independent
The Monster	Roland West	Lon Chaney, Gertrude Olmstead	Comedy horror	MGM
Morals for Men	Bernard H. Hyman	Conway Tearle, Agnes Ayres, Alyce Mills	Drama	Tiffany
My Lady of Whims	Dallas M. Fitzgerald	Clara Bow, Donald Keith	Comedy	Independent
My Lady's Lips	James P. Hogan	William Powell, Clara Bow	Drama	Paramount
My Neighbor's Wife	Clarence Geldart	E. K. Lincoln, Helen Ferguson, Herbert Rawlinson	Comedy	Independent
My Son	Edwin Carewe	Alla Nazimova, Jack Pickford	Drama	First National
My Wife and I	Millard Webb	Irene Rich, Huntley Gordon	Drama	Warner Bros.
The Mysterious Stranger	Jack Nelson	Richard Talmadge, Josef Swickard, Carmelita Geraghty	Drama	FBO
The Mystic	Tod Browning	Aileen Pringle, Conway Tearle	Thriller	MGM

== N ==
Title	Director	Featured Cast	Genre	Note
The Narrow Street	William Beaudine	Matt Moore, Dorothy Devore	Comedy	Warner Bros.
The Necessary Evil	George Archainbaud	Ben Lyon, Viola Dana	Drama	First National
New Brooms	William C. deMille	Neil Hamilton, Bessie Love, Phyllis Haver	Comedy	Paramount
The New Champion	B. Reeves Eason	William Fairbanks, Edith Roberts	Action	Columbia
The New Commandment	Howard Higgin	Blanche Sweet, Ben Lyon	War	First National
New Lives for Old	Clarence G. Badger	Betty Compson, Wallace MacDonald	Drama	Paramount
New Toys	John S. Robertson	Richard Barthelmess, Clifton Webb	Comedy	First National
Never the Twain Shall Meet	Maurice Tourneur	Anita Stewart, Bert Lytell	Drama	MGM
Never Too Late	Forrest Sheldon	Francis X. Bushman Jr., Gino Corrado, Ollie Kirkby	Comedy	Independent
The Night Club	Paul Iribe, Frank Urson	Raymond Griffith, Vera Reynolds, Wallace Beery	Comedy	Paramount
Night Life of New York	Allan Dwan	Rod La Rocque, Dorothy Gish	Comedy	Paramount
The Night Ship	Henry McCarty	Mary Carr, Tom Santschi, Robert Gordon	Drama	Gotham
No Man's Law	Del Andrews	Bob Custer, Ethan Laidlaw	Western	FBO
North of Nome	Raymond K. Johnson	Robert McKim, Gladys Johnston, Robert N. Bradbury	Action	Arrow
North Star	Paul Powell	Virginia Lee Corbin, Stuart Holmes, Ken Maynard	Adventure	Pathé Exchange
Northern Code	Leon De La Mothe	Robert Ellis, Eva Novak, Josef Swickard	Adventure	Gotham
Not So Long Ago	Sidney Olcott	Betty Bronson, Ricardo Cortez	Comedy	Paramount

== O ==
Title	Director	Featured Cast	Genre	Note
Off the Highway	Tom Forman	William V. Mong, Marguerite De La Motte	Drama	PDC
Oh Doctor!	Harry A. Pollard	Reginald Denny, Mary Astor	Comedy	Universal
Old Clothes	Edward F. Cline	Jackie Coogan, Joan Crawford	Drama	MGM
Old Home Week	Victor Heerman	Thomas Meighan, Lila Lee	Comedy	Paramount
Old Shoes	Frederick Stowers	Noah Beery, ZaSu Pitts	Drama	Independent
On the Go	Richard Thorpe	Jay Wilsey, Helen Foster, Nelson McDowell	Western	Independent
On Thin Ice	Malcolm St. Clair	Tom Moore, Edith Roberts	Crime	Warner Bros.
Once in a Lifetime	Duke Worne	Ashton Dearholt, Theodore Lorch	Drama	Independent
One of the Bravest	Frank O'Connor	Ralph Lewis, Edward Hearn, Sidney Franklin	Action	Gotham
One Way Street	John Francis Dillon	Ben Lyon, Anna Q. Nilsson, Marjorie Daw	Drama	First National
One Year to Live	Irving Cummings	Aileen Pringle, Dorothy Mackaill	Drama	First National
The Only Thing	Jack Conway	Eleanor Boardman, Conrad Nagel	Romance	MGM
The Open Switch	J. P. McGowan	Helen Holmes, Jack Perrin	Action	Rayart
The Other Woman's Story	B. F. Stanley	Alice Calhoun, Robert Frazer	Drama	Independent
The Outlaw's Daughter	John B. O'Brien	Josie Sedgwick, Edward Hearn	Western	Universal
Outwitted	J. P. McGowan	Helen Holmes, William Desmond	Drama	Independent
The Overland Limited	Frank O'Neill	Malcolm McGregor, Olive Borden	Action	Gotham

== P ==
Title	Director	Featured Cast	Genre	Note
The Pace That Thrills	Webster Campbell	Ben Lyon, Mary Astor	Drama	First National
Paint and Powder	Hunt Stromberg	Elaine Hammerstein, Theodore von Eltz	Drama	Independent
Pals	John P. McCarthy	Louise Lorraine, Art Acord, Leon De La Mothe	Western	Independent
Pampered Youth	David Smith	Cullen Landis, Ben Alexander	Drama	Vitagraph
The Parasite	Louis J. Gasnier	Owen Moore, Madge Bellamy	Drama	Independent
Parisian Love	Louis J. Gasnier	Clara Bow, Donald Keith	Drama	Independent
Parisian Nights	Alfred Santell	Elaine Hammerstein, Gaston Glass	Drama	FBO
The Part Time Wife	Henry McCarty	Alice Calhoun, Robert Ellis, Freeman Wood	Drama	Gotham
Passionate Youth	Dallas M. Fitzgerald	Beverly Bayne, Frank Mayo, Pauline Garon	Drama	Independent
Paths to Paradise	Clarence G. Badger	Raymond Griffith, Betty Compson	Comedy	Paramount
Peacock Feathers	Svend Gade	Jacqueline Logan, Cullen Landis, Ward Crane	Drama	Universal
The People vs. Nancy Preston	Tom Forman	Marguerite De La Motte, John Bowers	Drama	PDC
Percy	Roy William Neill	Charles Ray, Louise Dresser	Comedy	Pathé Exchange
The Perfect Clown	Fred C. Newmeyer	Larry Semon, Dorothy Dwan, Oliver Hardy	Comedy	Independent
Perils of the Rail	J. P. McGowan	Helen Holmes, Edward Hearn, Wilfrid North	Action	Independent
The Phantom Express	John G. Adolfi	Ethel Shannon, David Butler	Action	Independent
Phantom of the Opera	Rupert Julian	Lon Chaney, Mary Philbin, Norman Kerry	Horror	Universal
The Pinch Hitter	Joseph Henabery	Glenn Hunter, Constance Bennett	Sports comedy	Independent
The Plastic Age	Wesley Ruggles	Clara Bow, Gilbert Roland	Dramatic Comedy	Independent
Playing with Souls	Ralph Ince	Jacqueline Logan, Mary Astor, Clive Brook	Drama	First National
Pleasure Buyers	Chester Withey	Irene Rich, Clive Brook, Gayne Whitman	Drama	Warner Bros.
The Police Patrol	Burton L. King	James Kirkwood, Edna Murphy, Edmund Breese	Crime	Gotham
The Pony Express	James Cruze	Betty Compson, Ricardo Cortez, Wallace Beery	Western	Paramount
Ports of Call	Denison Clift	Edmund Lowe, Hazel Keener	Drama	Fox Film
The Prairie Pirate	Edmund Mortimer	Harry Carey, Robert Edeson	Western	PDC
The Prairie Wife	Hugo Ballin	Dorothy Devore, Herbert Rawlinson	Western	MGM
Pretty Ladies	Monta Bell	ZaSu Pitts, Conrad Nagel	Comedy Drama	MGM
The Price of Pleasure	Edward Sloman	Virginia Valli, Norman Kerry, Louise Fazenda	Drama	Universal
The Price of Success	Tony Gaudio	Alice Lake, Lee Shumway	Drama	Columbia
The Pride of the Force	Duke Worne	Tom Santschi, Gladys Hulette	Action	Rayart
The Primrose Path	Harry O. Hoyt	Wallace MacDonald, Clara Bow	Drama	Independent
The Prince of Pep	Jack Nelson	Richard Talmadge, Nola Luxford	Drama	FBO
Private Affairs	Renaud Hoffman	Gladys Hulette, Mildred Harris	Drama	PDC
Proud Flesh	King Vidor	Eleanor Boardman, Pat O'Malley	Comedy drama	MGM
Pursued	Dell Henderson	Gaston Glass, Marcella Daly	Drama	Independent
Quicker'n Lightnin'	Richard Thorpe	Jay Wilsey, Harry Todd, Lucille Young	Western	Independent

== R ==
Title	Director	Featured Cast	Genre	Note
Raffles, the Amateur Cracksman	King Baggot	House Peters, Miss DuPont, Hedda Hopper	Crime	Universal
The Rag Man	Edward F. Cline	Jackie Coogan, Max Davidson	Drama	MGM
The Rainbow Trail	Lynn Reynolds	Tom Mix, Anne Cornwall	Western	Fox Film
Ranchers and Rascals	Leo D. Maloney	Leo D. Maloney, Josephine Hill	Comedy western	Independent
Range Buzzards	Tom Gibson	Pete Morrison, Hazel Keener	Western	Vitagraph
The Range Terror	William James Craft	Bob Custer, Claire de Lorez	Western	FBO
Ranger of the Big Pines	W. S. Van Dyke	Kenneth Harlan, Eugene Pallette, Helene Costello	Western	Vitagraph
The Re-Creation of Brian Kent	Sam Wood	Kenneth Harlan, Helene Chadwick, Mary Carr	Drama	Independent
Reckless Courage	Tom Gibson	Buddy Roosevelt, Helen Foster, Jay Morley	Western	Independent
The Reckless Sex	Alan James	Madge Bellamy, William Collier Jr., Wyndham Standing	Drama	Independent
Recompense	Harry Beaumont	Marie Prevost, Monte Blue	Drama	Warner Bros.
Red Blood	J.P. McGowan	Al Hoxie, Lew Meehan, Eddie Barry	Western	Independent
Red Blood and Blue	James C. Hutchinson	Guinn 'Big Boy' Williams, Peggy O'Day	Western	FBO
Red Hot Tires	Erle C. Kenton	Monte Blue, Patsy Ruth Miller	Comedy	Warner Bros.
The Red Kimono	Walter Lang, Dorothy Davenport	Priscilla Bonner, Carl Miller, Tyrone Power Sr.	Drama	Independent
Red Love	Edgar Lewis	John Lowell, Evangeline Russell, Ann Brody	Drama	Independent
The Red Rider	Clifford Smith	Jack Hoxie, Mary McAllister	Western	Universal
The Redeeming Sin	J. Stuart Blackton	Nazimova, Lou Tellegen	Drama	Vitagraph
A Regular Fellow	A. Edward Sutherland	Raymond Griffith, Mary Brian, Tyrone Power Sr.	Comedy	Paramount
Riders of Mystery	Robert N. Bradbury	Bill Cody, Peggy O'Day	Western	Independent
Riders of the Purple Sage	Lynn Reynolds	Tom Mix, Mabel Ballin, Warner Oland	Western	Fox Film
Ridin' Pretty	Arthur Rosson	William Desmond, Ann Forrest	Western	Universal
The Ridin' Streak	Del Andrews	Bob Custer, Frank Brownlee	Western	FBO
Ridin' the Wind	Del Andrews	Fred Thomson, Jacqueline Gadsdon	Western	FBO
Ridin' Thunder	Clifford Smith	Jack Hoxie, Katherine Grant	Western	Universal
The Riding Comet	Ben F. Wilson	Yakima Canutt, Dorothy Wood	Western	FBO
Riding Romance	J. P. McGowan	Al Hoxie, Marjorie Bonner, Steve Clemente	Western	Independent
The Road Agent	J. P. McGowan	Al Hoxie, Lew Meehan	Western	Rayart
The Road to Yesterday	Cecil B. DeMille	Joseph Schildkraut, Jetta Goudal, William Boyd	Drama	PDC
A Roaring Adventure	Clifford Smith	Jack Hoxie, Mary McAllister, Marin Sais	Western	Universal
Romance and Rustlers	Ben F. Wilson	Yakima Canutt, Dorothy Wood, Joseph W. Girard	Western	Arrow
Rough Going	Wally Van	Franklyn Farnum, Vester Pegg	Comedy western	Independent
Rose of the World	Harry Beaumont	Patsy Ruth Miller, Allan Forrest, Pauline Garon	Drama	Warner Bros.
Rugged Water	Irvin Willat	Lois Wilson, Wallace Beery, Warner Baxter	Drama	Paramount

== S ==
Title	Director	Featured Cast	Genre	Note
Sackcloth and Scarlet	Henry King	Alice Terry, Orville Caldwell	Drama	Paramount
The Saddle Cyclone	Richard Thorpe	Jay Wilsey, Harry Todd, Lafe McKee	Western	Independent
The Sagebrush Lady	Horace B. Carpenter	Eileen Sedgwick, Ben Corbett	Western	Chesterfield
Sally	Alfred E. Green	Colleen Moore, Lloyd Hughes	Romantic comedy	First National
Sally, Irene and Mary	Edmund Goulding	Constance Bennett, Joan Crawford	Romance	MGM
Sally of the Sawdust	D. W. Griffith	Carol Dempster, W. C. Fields	Comedy	United Artists
Salome of the Tenements	Sidney Olcott	Jetta Goudal, Godfrey Tearle	Drama	Paramount
The Salvation Hunters	Josef von Sternberg	Georgia Hale, George K. Arthur	Drama	United Artists
Santa Fe Pete	Harry S. Webb	Pete Morrison, Lew Meehan	Western	Vitagraph
Satan in Sables	James Flood	Lowell Sherman, Pauline Garon	Drama	Warner Bros.
Savages of the Sea	Bruce Mitchell	Frank Merrill, Melbourne MacDowell, Marguerite Snow	Action	Independent
Scandal Proof	Edmund Mortimer	Shirley Mason, John Roche	Drama	Fox Film
Scandal Street	Whitman Bennett	Niles Welch, Madge Kennedy	Drama	Independent
Scar Hanan	Edward Linden, Ben F. Wilson	Yakima Canutt, Dorothy Wood	Western	FBO
The Scarlet Honeymoon	Alan Hale	Shirley Mason, Pierre Gendron	Drama	Fox Film
Scarlet Saint	George Archainbaud	Mary Astor, Lloyd Hughes, Frank Morgan	Drama	First National
The Scarlet West	John G. Adolfi	Robert Frazer, Clara Bow	Historical	First National
School for Wives	Victor Halperin	Conway Tearle, Sigrid Holmquist	Drama	Vitagraph
Sealed Lips	Tony Gaudio	Dorothy Revier, Cullen Landis	Drama	Columbia
Seven Chances	Buster Keaton	Buster Keaton, T. Roy Barnes	Comedy	MGM
Seven Days	Scott Sidney	Lillian Rich, Creighton Hale, Lilyan Tashman	Comedy	PDC
Seven Keys to Baldpate	Fred C. Newmeyer	Douglas MacLean, Edith Roberts	Thriller	Paramount
Seven Sinners	Lewis Milestone	Marie Prevost, Clive Brook	Crime comedy	Warner Bros.
The Shadow on the Wall	B. Reeves Eason	Eileen Percy, Creighton Hale, Hardee Kirkland	Mystery	Gotham
Share and Share Alike	Whitman Bennett	Jane Novak, James Rennie	Drama	Independent
Shattered Lives	Henry McCarty	Edith Roberts, Robert Gordon, Ethel Wales	Drama	Gotham
She Wolves	Maurice Elvey	Alma Rubens, Harry Myers	Drama	Fox Film
Sheriff's Girl	Ben F. Wilson	Ashton Dearholt, Neva Gerber	Western	Rayart
The Shield of Silence	Leo D. Maloney	Leo D. Maloney, Josephine Hill	Western	Pathé Exchange
The Ship of Souls	Charles Miller	Bert Lytell, Lillian Rich, Gertrude Astor	Western	Independent
The Shock Punch	Paul Sloane	Richard Dix, Frances Howard	Drama	Paramount
Shore Leave	John S. Robertson	Richard Barthelmess, Dorothy Mackaill	Comedy	First National
Siege	Svend Gade	Virginia Valli, Eugene O'Brien	Romance	Universal
The Sign of the Cactus	Clifford Smith	Jack Hoxie, Helen Holmes	Western	Universal
The Silent Guardian	Billy Bletcher	Louise Lorraine, Harry Tenbrook, Art Acord	Western	Independent
Silent Pal	Henry McCarty	Eddie Phillips, Shannon Day, Colin Kenny	Western	Gotham
Silent Sanderson	Scott R. Dunlap	Harry Carey, Trilby Clark	Western	PDC
Silent Sheldon	Harry S. Webb	Jack Perrin, Josephine Hill	Western	Rayart
Simon the Jester	George Melford	Eugene O'Brien, Lillian Rich	Drama	PDC
The Sky Raider	T. Hayes Hunter	Jacqueline Logan, Gladys Walton	Drama	Independent
A Slave of Fashion	Hobart Henley	Norma Shearer, Lew Cody	Comedy	MGM
Smilin' at Trouble	Harry Garson	Maurice "Lefty" Flynn, Helen Lynch	Drama	FBO
Smooth as Satin	Ralph Ince	Evelyn Brent, Bruce Gordon	Drama	FBO
Smouldering Fires	Clarence Brown	Laura La Plante, Malcolm McGregor	Drama	Universal
The Snob Buster	Albert S. Rogell	Reed Howes, Wilfred Lucas	Drama	Rayart
Soft Shoes	Lloyd Ingraham	Harry Carey, Lillian Rich	Drama	PDC
Soiled	Fred Windemere	Kenneth Harlan, Vivian Martin, Mildred Harris	Sports	Independent
Some Pun'kins	Jerome Storm	Charles Ray, George Fawcett	Comedy	Independent
A Son of His Father	Victor Fleming	Bessie Love, Warner Baxter	Western	Paramount
S.O.S. Perils of the Sea	James P. Hogan	Elaine Hammerstein, Robert Ellis	Thriller	Columbia
Soul Mates	Jack Conway	Aileen Pringle, Edmund Lowe	Drama	MGM
Soul-Fire	John S. Robertson	Richard Barthelmess, Bessie Love	Drama	First National
Souls for Sables	James C. McKay	Claire Windsor, Eugene O'Brien	Drama	Tiffany
The Spaniard	Raoul Walsh	Ricardo Cortez, Jetta Goudal	Drama	Paramount
Speed	Edward LeSaint	Betty Blythe, Pauline Garon	Drama	Independent
The Speed Demon	Robert N. Bradbury	Kenneth MacDonald, Peggy Montgomery	Action	Independent
Speed Mad	Jay Marchant	William Fairbanks, Edith Roberts	Action	Columbia
Speed Madness	Bruce Mitchell	Frank Merrill, Clara Horton, Joseph W. Girard	Action	Independent
Speed Wild	Harry Garson	Maurice 'Lefty' Flynn, Ethel Shannon	Drama	FBO
The Splendid Crime	William C. deMille	Bebe Daniels, Neil Hamilton	Crime	Paramount
The Splendid Road	Frank Lloyd	Lionel Barrymore, Marceline Day	Western	First National
Spook Ranch	Edward Laemmle	Hoot Gibson, Helen Ferguson	Western	Universal
The Sporting Chance	Oscar Apfel	Lou Tellegen, Dorothy Phillips	Sports	Tiffany
Sporting Life	Maurice Tourneur	Bert Lytell, Marian Nixon	Sports	Universal
The Sporting Venus	Marshall Neilan	Blanche Sweet, Ronald Colman	Romance	MGM
Stage Struck	Allan Dwan	Gloria Swanson, Lawrence Gray	Comedy	Paramount
Stampede Thunder	Tom Gibson	Pete Morrison, Betty Goodwin	Western	Vitagraph
Starlight, the Untamed	Harry S. Webb	Jack Perrin, Josephine Hill	Adventure	Rayart
Steel Preferred	James P. Hogan	Vera Reynolds, William Boyd	Drama	PDC
Steele of the Royal Mounted	David Smith	Bert Lytell, Stuart Holmes	Western	Vitagraph
Stella Dallas	Henry King	Ronald Colman, Belle Bennett	Drama	United Artists
Stella Maris	Charles Brabin	Mary Philbin, Elliott Dexter	Drama	Universal
Steppin' Out	Frank R. Strayer	Dorothy Revier, Ford Sterling	Comedy	Columbia
Stop Flirting	Scott Sidney	Wanda Hawley, John T. Murray	Comedy	PDC
The Storm Breaker	Edward Sloman	House Peters, Ruth Clifford	Drama	Universal
Straight Through	Arthur Rosson	William Desmond, Marguerite Clayton	Western	Universal
A Streak of Luck	Richard Thorpe	Jay Wilsey, Dorothy Wood, Nelson McDowell	Western	Independent
The Street of Forgotten Men	Herbert Brenon	Percy Marmont, Louise Brooks	Drama	Paramount
The Substitute Wife	Wilfred Noy	Jane Novak, Niles Welch	Drama	Independent
Sun-Up	Edmund Goulding	Pauline Starke, Conrad Nagel, Lucille La Verne	Drama	MGM
Super Speed	Al Rogell	Reed Howes, Mildred Harris	Comedy	Rayart
The Swan	Dimitri Buchowetzki	Frances Howard, Adolphe Menjou	Romantic comedy	Paramount

== T ==
Title	Director	Featured Cast	Genre	Note
The Talker	Alfred E. Green	Anna Q. Nilsson, Lewis Stone	Drama	First National
The Taming of the West	Arthur Rosson	Hoot Gibson, Marceline Day	Western	Universal
Tearin' Loose	Richard Thorpe	Hal Taliaferro, Jean Arthur	Western	Independent
Tearing Through	Arthur Rosson	Richard Talmadge, Kathryn McGuire	Action	FBO
The Teaser	William A. Seiter	Laura La Plante, Pat O'Malley, Hedda Hopper. Walter McGrail	Romantic Comedy/Drama	Universal
Tessie	Dallas M. Fitzgerald	May McAvoy, Lee Moran	Comedy	Independent
The Texas Bearcat	B. Reeves Eason	Bob Custer, Sally Rand	Western	FBO
The Texas Terror	J.P. McGowan	Al Hoxie, Ione Reed, Gordon Sackville	Western	Independent
The Texas Trail	Scott R. Dunlap	Harry Carey, Ethel Shannon	Western	PDC
Thank You	John Ford	Alec B. Francis, Jacqueline Logan	Comedy	Fox Film
That Devil Quemado	Del Andrews	Fred Thomson, Nola Luxford	Western	FBO
That Man Jack!	William James Craft	Bob Custer, Mary Beth Milford	Western	FBO
That Royle Girl	D. W. Griffith	Carol Dempster, W. C. Fields	Comedy	Paramount
The Thoroughbred	Oscar Apfel	Theodore von Eltz, Gladys Hulette	Sports	Independent
A Thief in Paradise	George Fitzmaurice	Doris Kenyon, Ronald Colman, Aileen Pringle	Drama	First National
Three in Exile	Fred Windemere	Louise Lorraine, Art Acord	Western	Independent
Three Keys	Edward LeSaint	Edith Roberts, Jack Mulhall, Gaston Glass	Drama	Independent
Three of a Kind	F. Harmon Weight	Evelyn Brent, Fanny Midgley	Crime	FBO
Three Weeks in Paris	Roy Del Ruth	Matt Moore	Comedy	Warner Bros.
Thunder Mountain	Victor Schertzinger	Madge Bellamy, Leslie Fenton	Drama	First National
The Thundering Herd	William K. Howard	Jack Holt, Lois Wilson, Noah Beery Sr.	Western	Paramount
Tides of Passion	J. Stuart Blackton	Mae Marsh, Laska Winter	Drama	Vitagraph
The Timber Wolf	W. S. Van Dyke	Buck Jones, Elinor Fair	Western	Fox Film
Time, the Comedian	Robert Z. Leonard	Mae Busch, Lew Cody	Drama	MGM
Tomorrow's Love	Paul Bern	Agnes Ayres, Raymond Hatton	Comedy	Paramount
Tonio, Son of the Sierras	Ben F. Wilson	Neva Gerber, Robert Walker, Ruth Royce	Western	Independent
Too Many Kisses	Paul Sloane	Richard Dix, Frances Howard	Comedy	Paramount
Too Much Youth	Duke Worne	Ashton Dearholt, Sylvia Breamer, Eric Mayne	Comedy	Independent
The Top of the World	George Melford	James Kirkwood, Anna Q. Nilsson	Drama	Paramount
The Tower of Lies	Victor Sjostrom	Norma Shearer, Lon Chaney	Drama	MGM
Tracked in the Snow Country	Herman C. Raymaker	June Marlowe, David Butler	Adventure	Warner Bros.
The Trail Rider	W. S. Van Dyke	Buck Jones, Nancy Deaver	Western	Fox Film
The Train Wreckers	J. P. McGowan	Helen Holmes, Franklyn Farnum	Drama	Independent
Tricks	Bruce Mitchell	Marilyn Mills, J. Frank Glendon, Dorothy Vernon	Comedy	Independent
Triple Action	Tom Gibson	Pete Morrison, Trilby Clark	Western	Universal
The Trouble with Wives	Malcolm St. Clair	Florence Vidor, Esther Ralston	Comedy	Paramount
Tumbleweeds	William S. Hart, King Baggot	William S. Hart	Western	United Artists
Two-Fisted Jones	Edward Sedgwick	Jack Hoxie, Kathryn McGuire	Western	Universal
A Two-Fisted Sheriff	Ben F. Wilson	Yakima Canutt, Ruth Stonehouse	Western	Arrow

== U-V ==
Title	Director	Featured Cast	Genre	Note
The Unchastened Woman	James Young	Theda Bara, Wyndham Standing	Drama	Independent
Under the Rouge	Lewis H. Moomaw	Eileen Percy, Tom Moore	Drama	Independent
The Unguarded Hour	Lambert Hillyer	Milton Sills, Doris Kenyon	Comedy drama	First National
The Unholy Three	Tod Browning	Lon Chaney, Mae Busch, Victor McLaglen	Crime	MGM
The Unknown Lover	Victor Halperin	Elsie Ferguson, Frank Mayo, Mildred Harris	Drama	Vitagraph
The Unnamed Woman	Harry O. Hoyt	Katherine MacDonald, Herbert Rawlinson, Wanda Hawley	Drama	Independent
Unrestrained Youth	Joseph Levering	Brandon Tynan, Gardner James, Alice Mann	Drama	Independent
The Unwritten Law	Edward LeSaint	Elaine Hammerstein, Forrest Stanley	Crime	Columbia
Up the Ladder	Edward Sloman	Virginia Valli, Forrest Stanley	Drama	Universal
The Vanishing American	George B. Seitz	Richard Dix, Lois Wilson, Noah Beery	Western	Paramount; Remake of 1955 film
The Verdict	Fred Windemere	Lou Tellegen, Louise Lorraine, Gertrude Astor	Mystery	Independent
Vic Dyson Pays	Jacques Jaccard	Ben F. Wilson, Neva Gerber, Joseph W. Girard	Western	Arrow

== W ==
Title	Director	Featured Cast	Genre	Note
Wages for Wives	Frank Borzage	Jacqueline Logan, Creighton Hale	Comedy	Fox Film
Waking Up the Town	James Cruze	Jack Pickford, Claire McDowell, Norma Shearer	Comedy	United Artists
The Wall Street Whiz	Jack Nelson	Richard Talmadge, Marceline Day	Drama	FBO
The Wanderer	Raoul Walsh	Greta Nissen, Wallace Beery, Tyrone Power Sr.	Drama	Paramount
Wandering Fires	Maurice S. Campbell	Constance Bennett, George Hackathorne	Drama	FBO
Wandering Footsteps	Phil Rosen	Alec B. Francis, Estelle Taylor	Drama	Independent
Was It Bigamy?	Charles Hutchison	Edith Thornton, Earle Williams, Wilfred Lucas	Drama	Independent
Wasted Lives	John Gorman	Cullen Landis, Edith Roberts	Drama	Independent
The Way of a Girl	Robert G. Vignola	Eleanor Boardman, Matt Moore	Drama	MGM
We Moderns	John Francis Dillon	Colleen Moore, Jack Mulhall	Comedy	First National
Webs of Steel	J.P. McGowan	Helen Holmes, Bruce Gordon	Thriller	Independent
The Wedding Song	Alan Hale	Leatrice Joy, Robert Ames, Charles K. Gerrard	Drama	PDC
Welcome Home	James Cruze	Lois Wilson, Warner Baxter, Margaret Morris	Drama	Paramount
West of Arizona	Tom Gibson	Pete Morrison, Beth Darlington	Western	Vitagraph
West of Mojave	Harry L. Fraser	Gordon Clifford, Charlotte Pierce	Western	Independent
What Fools Men	George Archainbaud	Lewis Stone, Shirley Mason	Drama	First National
The Wheel	Victor Schertzinger	Margaret Livingston, Harrison Ford	Drama	Fox Film
When Husbands Flirt	William A. Wellman	Dorothy Revier, Forrest Stanley	Comedy	Columbia
When the Door Opened	Reginald Barker	Jacqueline Logan, Walter McGrail	Drama	Fox Film
Where Romance Rides	Ward Hayes	Dick Hatton, Marilyn Mills, Roy Laidlaw	Western	Arrow
Where the Worst Begins	John McDermott	Ruth Roland, Alec B. Francis, Matt Moore	Western	Independent
Where Was I?	William A. Seiter	Reginald Denny, Marian Nixon	Comedy	Universal
The White Desert	Reginald Barker	Claire Windsor, Robert Frazer	Drama	MGM
White Fang	Laurence Trimble	Theodore von Eltz, Ruth Dwyer	Adventure	FBO
The White Monkey	Phil Rosen	Barbara La Marr, Thomas Holding	Drama	First National
White Thunder	Ben F. Wilson	Yakima Canutt, Lew Meehan	Western	FBO
The White Outlaw	Clifford Smith	Jack Hoxie, Marceline Day	Western	Universal
Who Cares	David Kirkland	Dorothy Devore, William Haines	Drama	Columbia
Who's Your Friend	Forrest Sheldon	Francis X. Bushman Jr., Jimmy Aubrey	Comedy	Independent
Why Women Love	Edwin Carewe	Blanche Sweet, Robert Frazer	Drama	First National
The Wife Who Wasn't Wanted	James Flood	Irene Rich, Huntley Gordon	Drama	Warner Bros.
The Wild Bull's Lair	Del Andrews	Fred Thomson, Herbert Prior	Western	FBO
Wild Horse Canyon	Ben F. Wilson	Yakima Canutt, Helene Rosson	Western	Independent
Wild Horse Mesa	George B. Seitz	Jack Holt, Noah Beery, Billie Dove	Western	Paramount
Wild Justice	Chester Franklin	Frank Hagney, George Sherwood	Adventure	United Artists
Wild, Wild Susan	A. Edward Sutherland	Bebe Daniels, Rod La Rocque	Comedy	Paramount
Wildfire	T. Hayes Hunter	Aileen Pringle, Edna Murphy	Drama	Vitagraph
The Winding Stair	John Griffith Wray	Alma Rubens, Edmund Lowe, Warner Oland	Drama	Fox Film
Winds of Chance	Frank Lloyd	Anna Q. Nilsson, Ben Lyon	Adventure	First National
Wings of Youth	Emmett J. Flynn	Ethel Clayton, Madge Bellamy, Charles Farrell	Drama	Fox Film
Winning a Woman	Harry S. Webb	Jack Perrin, Josephine Hill	Action	Rayart
With This Ring	Fred Windemere	Alyce Mills, Forrest Stanley	Drama	Independent
Without Mercy	George Melford	Dorothy Phillips, Vera Reynolds	Drama	PDC
The Wizard of Oz	Larry Semon	Bryant Washburn, Dorothy Dwan	Fantasy	Independent
Wolf Blood	George Chesebro, Bruce Mitchell	George Chesebro, Marguerite Clayton	Horror	Independent
Womanhandled	Gregory La Cava	Richard Dix, Esther Ralston	Comedy	Paramount
The Woman Hater	James Flood	Helene Chadwick, Clive Brook	Drama	Warner Bros.
A Woman of the World	Mal St. Clair	Pola Negri, Holmes Herbert	Comedy drama	Paramount
A Woman's Faith	Edward Laemmle	Alma Rubens, Percy Marmont, Jean Hersholt	Drama	Universal
Women and Gold	James P. Hogan	Frank Mayo, Sylvia Breamer	Drama	Gotham
Wreckage	Scott R. Dunlap	May Allison, Holmes Herbert, John Miljan	Drama	Independent
The Wrongdoers	Hugh Dierker	Lionel Barrymore, Anne Cornwall	Drama	Independent
The Wyoming Wildcat	Robert De Lacey	Tom Tyler, Ethan Laidlaw	Western	FBO

== Y–Z ==
Title	Director	Featured Cast	Genre	Note
Youth and Adventure	James W. Horne	Richard Talmadge, Margaret Landis	Comedy	FBO
Youth's Gamble	Albert S. Rogell	Reed Howes, Margaret Morris	Action	Rayart
Zander the Great	George W. Hill	Marion Davies, Emily Fitzroy, Hedda Hopper	Drama	MGM

== See also ==
- 1925 in the United States
