= Paul Gerson Pictures Corporation =

Film studio in San Francisco, 1920–1927

Paul Gerson Pictures Corporation was a film studio located in San Francisco circa 1920-1927, with principals Paul Gerson (5 Jan 1871 - 6 Jun 1957) and William A. Howell, and employee Frank Capra. Various names used for the business included: The Paul Gerson Pictures Corporation, Paul Gerson Pictures Corporation, Paul Gerson Pictures, Gerson Pictures Corporation, Gerson Pictures, Gerson Studios.

== History ==
In 1921, A. H. Sebastian was the general manager. He and Paul Gerson toured Eureka, California, expressing interest in building a studio there.

Later, from August 1922 to May 1923, for Gerson Pictures Corporation, directed by Robert Eddy, Dan Mason played Pop Tuttle in the Plump Center Comedies short films, set in an imaginary city, Plump Center, with performers: Wilna Hervey, Oliver J. Eckhart and Helen Howell:

- Pop Tuttle's Movie Queen (1922)
- Pop Tuttle's One Horse Play (1922)
- Pop Tuttle's Clever Catch (1922)
- Pop Tuttle, Fire Chief (1922)
- Pop Tuttle's Grass Widow (1922)
- Pop Tuttle, Deteckative (1922)
- Pop Tuttle's Long Shot (1923)
- Pop Tuttle's Polecat Plot (1923)
- Pop Tuttle's Lost Control (1923)
- Pop Tuttle's Lost Nerve (1923)
- Pop Tuttle's Russian Rumor (1923)
- Pop Tuttle's Tack-Tics (1923)

By January 1923, Paul Gerson, had bought the Montague Studios at 1974 Page Street in San Francisco, and begun expanding it as the new Gerson Studios. Yet, according to the 6 Jan 1923 Camera, Gerson left for Los Angeles to supervise the filming of The Cricket on the Hearth at Universal Studios.

In 1924, Frank Capra's then father-in-law, William A. Howell (Capra's first wife was actress Helen Howell), was a principal investor in Paul Gerson Pictures Corporation.

In 1924, articles stated that Gerson Studios were located in San Francisco, and another article claimed that B. Berger, the company’s general manager, was based in Los Angeles.

== Filmography ==
- The Boaster
- The Call of the Klondike
- The Canvas Kisser
- The Cricket on the Hearth (1923 film)
- Easy Going Gordon
- Getting Her Man
- Going the Limit (1925 film)
- In Search of a Hero
- The Last Alarm (1926 film)
- Once in a Lifetime (1925 film)
- Paying the Limit
- The Pride of the Force (1925 film)
- Too Much Youth

== Directors ==
- Oscar Apfel
- Duke Worne
- Ira M. Lowry
- Robert Eddy

== Distributors ==
- Rayart Pictures Corporation
- Renown Pictures (1923)
- Selznick Distributing Corporation
- States rights distribution

== Sources ==
- Munden, Kenneth White. The American Film Institute Catalog of Motion Pictures Produced in the United States, Part 1. University of California Press, 1997. ISBN 978-0-520-20969-5.
