= Once in a Lifetime (1925 film) =

1925 film

- Directed by: Duke Worne
- Written by: Grover Jones
- Produced by: Paul Gerson
- Starring: Ashton Dearholt; Theodore Lorch; Les Bates
- Cinematography: Ernest F. Smith
- Edited by: J. Logan Pearson
- Production company: Gerson Pictures
- Distributed by: Rayart Pictures
- Release date: October 22, 1925
- Running time: 50 minutes
- Country: United States
- Languages: Silent; English intertitles

Once in a Lifetime is a 1925 American silent comedy drama film directed by Duke Worne and starring Ashton Dearholt, Theodore Lorch and Les Bates.

== Synopsis ==
A young man addicted into golf enjoys a series of adventures in which he rescues the Mayor's daughter from an attacker, and later saves her father from assassination from the same man.

== Cast ==
- Ashton Dearholt as Glenn Horton
- Mary Beth Milford as Edna Perry
- Wilbur Higgins as Martin Perry
- Theodore Lorch as Tommy
- Les Bates as Hobo
- John M. O'Brien as Marty Taylor

== Bibliography ==
- Munden, Kenneth White. The American Film Institute Catalog of Motion Pictures Produced in the United States, Part 1. University of California Press, 1997. ISBN 978-0-520-20969-5.
