= Going the Limit =

Going the Limit may refer to:

- Going the Limit (1925 film), American silent drama film
- Going the Limit (1926 film), American silent comedy film
