= Do It Now (film) =

1924 film directed by Duke Worne

- Directed by: Duke Worne
- Written by: Malcolm S. White
- Produced by: Phil Goldstone
- Starring: William Fairbanks; Alec B. Francis; Jim Thorpe
- Cinematography: Edgar Lyons; Roland Price
- Production company: Phil Goldstone Productions
- Distributed by: Renown Pictures
- Release date: February 1, 1924 (US)
- Running time: 6 reels
- Country: United States
- Language: English

Do It Now is a 1924 American melodrama film directed by Duke Worne and produced by Phil Goldstone from a screenplay by Malcolm S. White. The film stars William Fairbanks, Alec B. Francis, and Madge Bellamy.

== Cast ==
- William Fairbanks
- Alec B. Francis
- Madge Bellamy
- Arthur Hoyt
- John Fox Jr.
- G. Raymond "Bill" Nye
- Dorothy Revier

== Reception ==
The News-Democrat's headline about the film read, "A Sensation in Hollywood", and they stated, "'Do It Now' So Good That It Even Thrilled Hollywood." The Film Daily gave it a lukewarm review, stating, "it is a weak entertainment. Story way too slight and without originality." They also felt the cast was simply adequate and the production was nothing special.
