= The Cricket on the Hearth (1923 film) =

1923 film by Lorimer Johnston

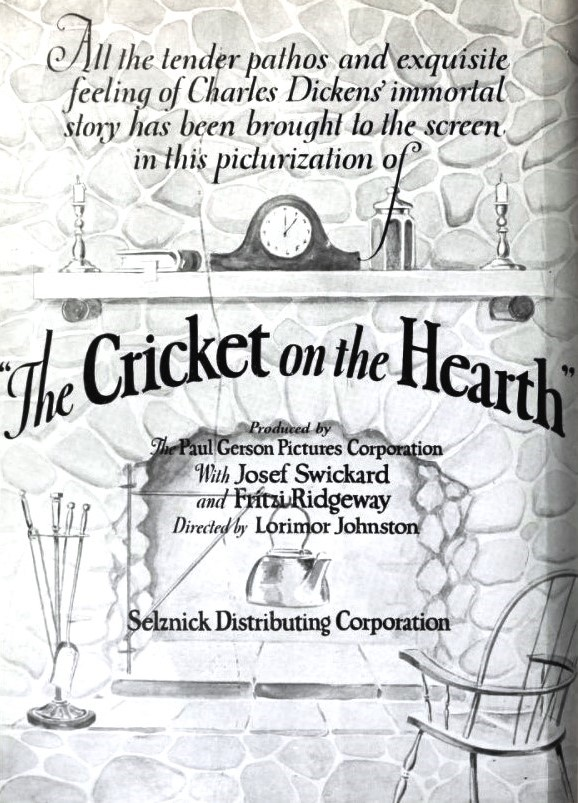
- Advertisement
- Directed by: Lorimer Johnston
- Written by: Caroline Frances Cooke
- Based on: The Cricket on the Hearth by Charles Dickens
- Produced by: Paul Gerson
- Starring: Josef Swickard; Fritzi Ridgeway; Virginia Brown Faire
- Production company: Paul Gerson Pictures Corporation
- Distributed by: Selznick Distributing Corporation
- Release date: August 11, 1923
- Running time: 82 minutes
- Country: United States
- Language: Silent (English intertitles)

The Cricket on the Hearth is a 1923 American silent comedy film directed by Lorimer Johnston and starring Josef Swickard, Fritzi Ridgeway, and Paul Gerson.

== Cast ==
- Josef Swickard as Caleb Plummer
- Fritzi Ridgeway as Bertha Plummer
- Paul Gerson as John Perrybingle
- Virginia Brown Faire as Dot Marley
- Paul Moore as Edward Plummer
- Lorimer Johnston as Josiah Tackleton
- Margaret Landis as May Fielding
- Joan Standing as Tillie Slowboy

== Production ==
According to the 6 Jan 1923 Camera, Paul Gerson left San Francisco for Los Angeles to supervise the filming of The Cricket on the Hearth at Universal Studios.

== Preservation ==
Prints of The Cricket on the Hearth are in the Archives Du Film Du CNC in Bois d'Arcy, UCLA Film and Television Archive, and Library of Congress.

== Bibliography ==
- Glavin, John. Dickens on Screen. Cambridge University Press, 2003.
