= The Boaster =

1926 film

- Directed by: Duke Worne
- Written by: Grover Jones
- Produced by: Paul Gerson
- Starring: Ashton Dearholt; Gloria Grey; Joseph W. Girard
- Production company: Gerson Pictures
- Distributed by: Aywon Film Corporation
- Release date: December 14, 1926
- Running time: 50 minutes
- Country: United States
- Languages: Silent; English intertitles

The Boaster is a 50-minute, 1926 American silent comedy film directed by Duke Worne and starring Ashton Dearholt, Gloria Grey and Joseph W. Girard.

== Synopsis ==
Angered by his son Dick's boastful ways, which in one incident lead him to lose a business deal, an automobile manufacturer challenges him to complete four difficult missions.

== Main cast ==
- Ashton Dearholt as Dick Benton
- Gloria Grey as Dick's intended
- Joseph W. Girard as Mr. Benton

== Bibliography ==
- Munden, Kenneth White. The American Film Institute Catalog of Motion Pictures Produced in the United States, Part 1. University of California Press, 1997.
