= Paying the Limit =

1924 silent film by Tom Gibson

- Directed by: Tom Gibson; Frank Capra (assistant director)
- Written by: Tom Gibson (scenario)
- Produced by: Paul Gerson Pictures
- Starring: Ora Carew
- Cinematography: George Crocker
- Distributed by: States' rights distribution
- Release date: February 10, 1924
- Running time: 5 reels
- Country: United States
- Language: Silent (English intertitles)

Paying the Limit is a 1924 American silent melodrama film directed by Tom Gibson and starring Ora Carew.

A print survives in the Library of Congress.

== Development ==
This film was the second in a series of Ora Carew-starring movies with the same company of actors:

1. Waterfront Wolves (1924)
2. Paying the Limit (1924)
3. Three Days to Live (1924)
4. Getting Her Man (1924)

== Cast ==
- Ora Carew as Raffles
- Helen Nowell as Joan Lowden
- Eddie O'Brien as Thunder Lowden
- Arthur Wellington as Jerry Davis
- Jay Morley as Tom Dover
- Tiny Sandford as Ole
- Dick Stevens as Baptiste Tudor

== Production ==
The San Francisco based studio filmed in Burlingame, California.
