= Anne Against the World =

1929 film

- Directed by: Duke Worne
- Written by: Arthur Hoerl
- Starring: Shirley Mason; Jack Mower
- Cinematography: Hap Depew
- Edited by: J. S. Harrington
- Distributed by: Rayart Pictures
- Release date: May 1, 1929
- Country: United States
- Language: Silent with English intertitles

Anne Against the World is a 1929 American drama film directed by Duke Worne and featuring Boris Karloff.

== Cast ==
- Shirley Mason as Anne
- Jack Mower as John Forbes
- James Bradbury Jr. as Eddie
- Billy Franey
- Isabelle Keith as Teddy
- Belle Stoddard
- Thomas A. Curran as Emmett
- Henry Roquemore as Folmer
- Boris Karloff
