= The Two-Soul Woman =

- Directed by: Elmer Clifton
- Written by: Gelett Burgess (novel); Elmer Clifton
- Starring: Priscilla Dean; Ashton Dearholt; Joseph W. Girard
- Production company: Universal Pictures
- Distributed by: Universal Pictures
- Release date: April 28, 1918
- Running time: 50 minutes
- Country: United States
- Languages: Silent; English intertitles

The Two-Soul Woman is a 1918 American silent drama film directed by Elmer Clifton and starring Priscilla Dean, Ashton Dearholt and Joseph W. Girard.

== Cast ==
- Priscilla Dean as Joy Fielding / Edna
- Ashton Dearholt as Chester Castle
- Joseph W. Girard as Dr. Copin
- Evelyn Selbie as Leah

== Bibliography ==
- James Robert Parish & Michael R. Pitts. Film directors: a guide to their American films. Scarecrow Press, 1974.
