= The Last Alarm (1926 film) =

1926 film

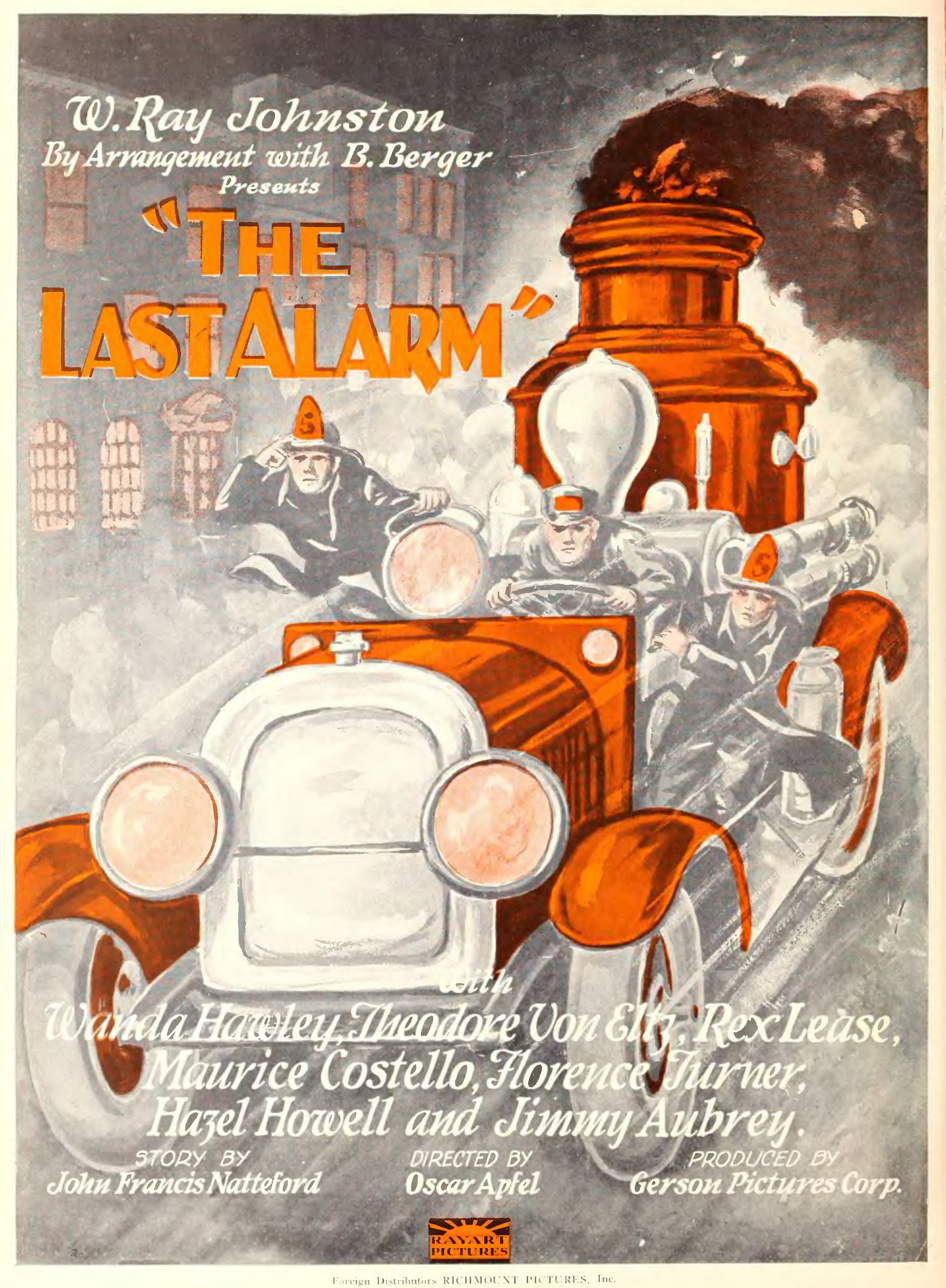
- Advertisement
- Directed by: Oscar Apfel
- Written by: Jack Natteford
- Produced by: W. Ray Johnston
- Starring: Rex Lease; Wanda Hawley; Theodore von Eltz
- Production company: Paul Gerson Pictures Corporation
- Distributed by: Rayart Pictures
- Release date: June 1926
- Running time: 60 minutes
- Country: United States
- Languages: Silent; English intertitles

The Last Alarm is a 1926 American silent drama film directed by Oscar Apfel and starring Rex Lease, Wanda Hawley, and Theodore von Eltz.

== Cast ==
- Rex Lease as Tom - a Fireman
- Wanda Hawley as Tom's Sweetheart, a Chorus Girl
- Theodore von Eltz as Joe, Tom's Pal, a Fireman
- Hazel Howell as The Fire Chief's Daughter
- Maurice Costello as The Captain of the Fire Brigade, Tom's Father
- Florence Turner as Warehouse Proprietor's Wife
- Jimmy Aubrey
- Oscar Apfel

== Bibliography ==
- Connelly, Robert B. The Silents: Silent Feature Films, 1910-36, Volume 40, Issue 2. December Press, 1998.
- Munden, Kenneth White. The American Film Institute Catalog of Motion Pictures Produced in the United States, Part 1. University of California Press, 1997.
