= Easy Going Gordon =

1925 film

- Directed by: Duke Worne
- Written by: Grover Jones
- Produced by: B. Berger; Paul Gerson Pictures
- Starring: Ashton Dearholt; Kathryn McGuire
- Distributed by: States' rights distribution
- Release dates: August 7, 1925; October 17, 1927 (Portugal)
- Running time: 5 reels
- Country: United States
- Languages: Silent..(English, Portuguese intertitles)

Easy Going Gordon is a 1925 American silent action film/comedy drama directed by Duke Worne and still exists.

It is preserved at the Library of Congress.

== Cast ==
- Ashton Dearholt - Gordon Palmer (*billed as Richard Holt)
- Kathryn McGuire - Aileen Merton
- J. Gordon Russell - Slung Williams (as Gordon Russell)
- Fernando Galvez - Beef O'Connell
- Roy Cushing - Judson
- Harris Gordon - George Elvin
