= Arthur Hoerl =

American screenwriter

- Born: Adolph Hoerl; December 17, 1891; New York City
- Died: February 6, 1968 (aged 76); Hollywood, California
- Occupations: Screenwriter, film director
- Years active: 1921–1968

Arthur Hoerl (December 17, 1891 – February 6, 1968) was an American screenwriter and film director. Hoerl was born in New York, son of Louis Hoerl, a German immigrant silver polisher, and Teresa Hoerl. Arthur completed three years of high school, according to the 1940 US Census.

He wrote for 150 films between 1921 and 1968. One of his best known credits is co-writer for the film Tell Your Children (1936) which is now known as Reefer Madness. For Broadway, 1932, he wrote the play A Few Wild Oats. He also directed four films between 1932 and 1934. Hoerl died in Hollywood, California.

== Partial filmography ==
- The Desert Sheik (1924), co-writer
- Headlines (1925), co-writer
- The White Monkey (1925), adapted to film
- The Pride of the Force (1925)
- Counsel for the Defense (1925)
- Lover's Island (1925)
- The Unfair Sex (1926)
- The Smoke Eaters (1926)
- The Romance of a Million Dollars (1926)
- In Search of a Hero (1926)
- Back to Liberty (1927)
- Polly of the Movies (1927)
- On the Stroke of Twelve (1927)
- The Winning Oar (1927)
- Gun-Hand Garrison (1927)
- Riley of the Rainbow Division (1928)
- Should a Girl Marry? (1928)
- Gypsy of the North (1928)
- The Phantom of the Turf (1928)
- Sisters of Eve (1928)
- Sweet Sixteen (1928)
- Trailin' Back (1928)
- The Black Pearl (1928)
- The Midnight Adventure (1928)
- The Man from Headquarters (1928)
- The Law and the Man (1928)
- Danger Patrol (1928)
- The Speed Classic (1928)
- Thundergod (1928)
- Inspiration (1928)
- The Devil's Chaplain (1929)
- Bride of the Desert (1929)
- Handcuffed (1929)
- In Old California (1929)
- Shanghai Rose (1929)
- Two Sisters (1929)
- When Dreams Come True (1929)
- Anne Against the World (1929)
- Some Mother's Boy (1929)
- Hell-Bent for Frisco (1931)
- Swanee River (1931)
- The Arm of the Law (1932)
- Guilty or Not Guilty (1932)
- Big Town (1932 - directed)
- Midnight Patrol (1932)
- Before Morning (1933 – directed)
- Drums O' Voodoo (1934 – directed)
- Enlighten Thy Daughter (1934)
- The Lady in Scarlet (1935)
- Reefer Madness (1936)
- Jungle Menace (1937)
- Cipher Bureau (1938)
- Panama Patrol (1939)
- Isle of Destiny (1940)
- Reg'lar Fellers (1941)
- Criminals Within (1941)
- The Vigilante (1947)
- The Sea Hound (1947)
- Brick Bradford (1947)
- Superman (1948)
- Tex Granger (1948)
- Shamrock Hill (1949)
- She Shoulda Said No! (1949)
- King of the Congo (1952)
- Son of Geronimo (1952)
- The Lost Planet (1953)
