= Getting Her Man =

1924 film

- Directed by: Tom Gibson
- Produced by: Paul Gerson
- Starring: Ora Carew
- Distributed by: Renown Pictures
- Release date: April 8, 1924
- Running time: 5 reels
- Country: United States
- Language: Silent (English intertitles)

Getting Her Man is a 1924 silent film comedy starring Ora Carew. The independent Renown Pictures released the film. A print is preserved at the Library of Congress.

== Development ==
This film was the fourth in a series of Ora Carew-starring movies with the same company of actors:

1. Waterfront Wolves (1924)
2. Paying the Limit (1924)
3. Three Days to Live (1924)
4. Getting Her Man (1924)

== Cast ==
- Ora Carew as Doris Stanton
- Jay Morley as Ben Daniels
- Arthur Wellington as Warren Bates
- Hal Stephens as Bates' assistant
