= The Devil's Chaplain =

1929 film

The Devil's Chaplain: Selected Essays
- Directed by: Duke Worne
- Written by: Arthur Hoerl; George Bronson Howard
- Produced by: Trem Carr
- Starring: Cornelius Keefe; Virginia Brown Faire; Josef Swickard
- Cinematography: Hap Depew
- Edited by: J. S. Harrington
- Production company: Trem Carr Productions
- Distributed by: Rayart Pictures
- Release date: March 2, 1929
- Country: United States
- Language: Silent with English intertitles

The Devil's Chaplain is a 1929 American silent romance film directed by Duke Worne, written by Arthur Hoerl and George Bronson Howard and featuring Boris Karloff. It was produced by Trem Carr and released by Rayart Pictures.

== Cast ==
- Cornelius Keefe as Yorke Norray
- Virginia Brown Faire as Princess Therese
- Josef Swickard as The King
- Boris Karloff as Boris
- Wheeler Oakman as Nicholay
- Leland Carr as Ivan
- George McIntosh as The Prince

== See also ==
- Boris Karloff filmography
