= A Yankee Go Getter =

1921 film

A Yankee Go-Getter
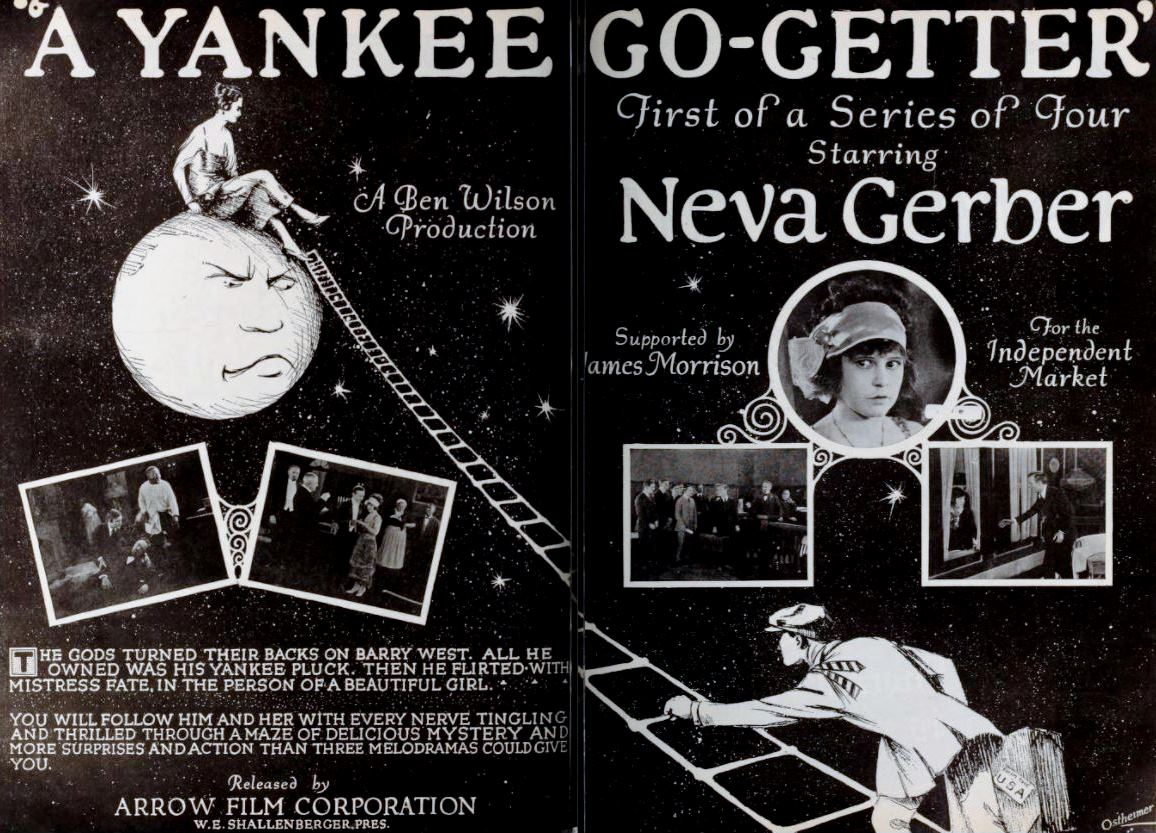
- Advertisement
- Directed by: Duke Worne
- Written by: Clifford Howard (story); Burke Jenkins (story)
- Produced by: Ben F. Wilson
- Starring: Neva Gerber
- Cinematography: King D. Gray
- Production company: Berwilla Film Corporation
- Distributed by: Arrow Film Corporation
- Release date: July 1921
- Running time: 5 reels
- Country: United States
- Language: Silent (English intertitles)

A Yankee Go-Getter is a 1921 American silent drama film directed by Duke Worne and starring Neva Gerber.

The film is preserved at the Library of Congress Packard Campus for Audio-Visual Conservation.

== Cast ==
- Neva Gerber as Lucia Robilant / Vera Robilant
- James Morrison as Barry West
- Joseph W. Girard as Nicholas Lanza (credited as Joseph Girard)
- Ashton Dearholt as Tronto
