= In Search of a Hero =

- Directed by: Duke Worne
- Written by: Arthur Hoerl
- Produced by: Paul Gerson
- Starring: Ashton Dearholt; Jane Thomas; James Harrison
- Production company: Paul Gerson Pictures Corporation
- Distributed by: Aywon Film Corporation
- Release date: September 15, 1926
- Running time: 50 minutes
- Country: United States
- Language: Silent (English intertitles)

In Search of a Hero is a 1926 American silent comedy film directed by Duke Worne and starring Ashton Dearholt, Jane Thomas, and James Harrison.

== Plot ==
As described in a film magazine review, Percy Browning and Jack Strong are expelled from college, and, to toughen them up, Old Browning sends them to work at his lumber camp. Arriving by train, the two discover that time at the camp is very different from their previous college life. Percy falls in love with Peggy Richmond, whose father is a competitor to the Brownings. The latter's foreman, Big Dan, uses unfair means to block work from the Richmonds. Percy, after being groomed by a pugilist, tackles Big Dan and beats him. After his father arrives, Percy explains everything and they are reconciled. Peggy admits that she loves Percy.

== Cast ==
- Ashton Dearholt as Percy Browning
- Jane Thomas as Peggy Richmond
- James Harrison as Jack Strong
- Garry O'Dell as Dinty
- Al Kaufman as Dugan
- Claire Vinson as Inez
- Les Bates as Big Dan
- Edgar Keller as Man
- George Periolat as French man

== Bibliography ==
- Robert B. Connelly. The Silents: Silent Feature Films, 1910-36, Volume 40, Issue 2. December Press, 1998.
