= The Reckless Sex =

1925 film directed by Alan James

- Directed by: Alan James
- Written by: Travers Wells
- Produced by: Phil Goldstone
- Starring: Madge Bellamy; William Collier Jr. Wyndham Standing
- Cinematography: Bert Baldridge; Edgar Lyons (additional photography)
- Production company: Phil Goldstone Productions
- Distributed by: Renown Pictures; Truart Film Corporation
- Release date: 1925 (US)
- Running time: 6 reels
- Country: United States
- Language: English

The Reckless Sex is a lost 1925 American melodrama film directed by Alan James from a screenplay by Travers Wells. The film stars Madge Bellamy, William Collier Jr., and Wyndham Standing.

== Plot ==
Robert Lanning Jr. is sent by his father in Boston to his ranch in New Mexico to stop the employees from smuggling firearms across the Mexico–United States border. During the voyage Lanning Jr. picks up stage actress Mary Hamilton from a roadshow production of Uncle Tom's Cabin, but believes she is a child because she is in character as Eva St. Claire. At the ranch he and the Rurales stops the gun smugglers, and after he realizes Mary is an adult he successfully proposes to her.

== Cast ==
- Madge Bellamy as Mary Hamilton
- William Collier Jr. as Juan
- Wyndham Standing as Carter Trevor
- Claire McDowell as Concha
- Johnnie Walker as Robert Lanning, Jr.
- Gertrude Astor as Lucile Dupré
- Alec B. Francis as Emanuel García
- Gladys Brockwell as Mrs. García
- David Torrence as Robert Lanning
- Helen Dunbar
- Walter Long

== Preservation ==
With no holdings located in archives, The Reckless Sex is considered a lost film.
