= Alec B. Francis =

English actor (1867–1934)

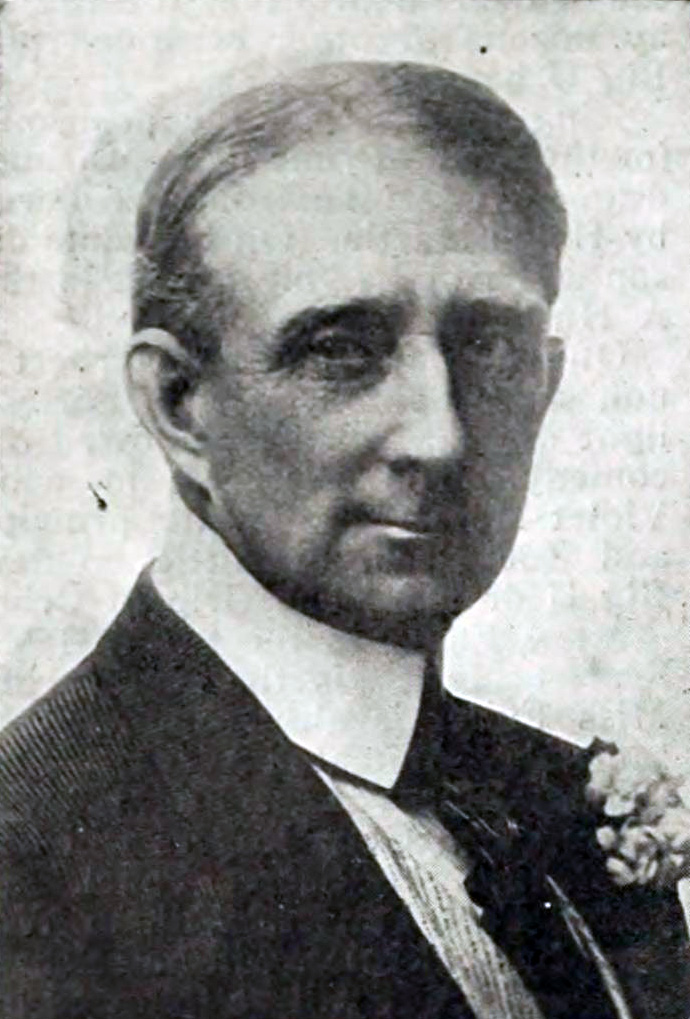
- Francis in 1916
- Born: Alec Francis Budd; 2 December 1867; Suffolk, England
- Died: 6 July 1934 (aged 66); Hollywood, California, United States
- Years active: 1906–1934
- Known for: Actor
- Spouse: Lucy Smith Bower (m. 1923)

Alec B. Francis (born Alec Francis Budd; 2 December 1867 – 6 July 1934) was an English actor, largely of the silent era. He appeared in more than 240 films between 1911 and 1934.

== Biography ==
Francis was born in Suffolk, England. He studied law at Uppingham College in England and practiced with a legal firm in London.

Disliking legal work, Francis joined a stock theater company for which he played bit parts, and was baggage master and property man. He eventually came under contract with a touring company headed by Mr. and Mrs. W. H. Kendall, acting in leading roles in England, India, South Africa, and the United States. He also performed in vaudeville.

Francis served twice in the military, once for Britain and once for the United States. He was in India for a four-year tour of duty with the British Royal Horse Artillery, and He was a nurse with American forces during the Spanish-American War.

Although Francis tried farming after his service as a nurse, he returned to acting and appeared in some plays, including musical productions in which he sang as a baritone. He began acting in films in 1913 and worked for Vitagraph, World, and other film studios.

Francis died in Hollywood Hospital in Hollywood, California, on 6 July 1934, three days after emergency abdominal surgery. His funeral was held at St. Athanasius Episcopal Church in Los Angeles, and his remains cremated.

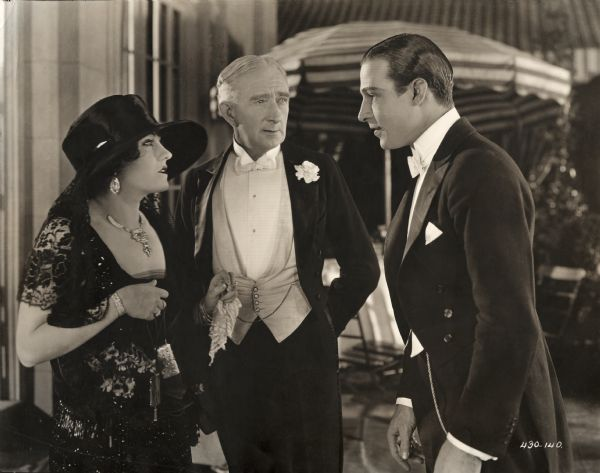
Theodora Fitzgerald and her father Captain Fitzgerald (played by Gloria Swanson and Alec B. Francis) talk to Lord Hector Bracondale (Rudolf Valentino) in a scene still for the 1922 silent drama Beyond the Rocks.

== Selected filmography ==
- Waiting at the Church (1906, Short) – Con Artist Suitor (uncredited)
- The Military Air-Scout (1911, Short) – Commander Arthur – Marie's Father
- A Reformed Santa Claus (1911, Short)
- Saved from the Titanic (1912, Short) – Father
- Robin Hood (1912, Short) – Sheriff of Nottingham
- The Man of the Hour (1914) – George Garrison
- When Broadway Was a Trail (1914) – Standish Hope
- The Wishing Ring: An Idyll of Old England (1914) – The Earl of Bateson
- Lola (1914) – Dr. Barnhelun
- The Pit (1914) – Cressler
- Alias Jimmy Valentine (1915) – Bill Avery
- The Arrival of Perpetua (1915) – Hastings Curzon
- The Model (1915) – Hugh Seymour
- After Dark (1915) – Capt. Frank Dalton, Old Tom
- The Impostor (1915) – Noel Ferrers
- The Ballet Girl (1916) – Jerry Vergoe
- Fruits of Desire (1916) – Jeremiah Quimby
- The Yellow Passport (1916) – Myron Abram
- The Pawn of Fate (1916) – Abbé Paul
- Human Driftwood (1916) – Father Harrigan
- Tangled Fates (1916) – Mr. Rogers
- The Perils of Divorce (1916) – Craig
- Miss Petticoats (1916) – Worth Courtleigh
- A Woman's Way (1916) – General John Stanton
- Husband and Wife (1916) – James Watson
- The Gilded Cage (1916) – King Comus
- The Heart of a Hero (1916) – Col. Knowlton
- All Man (1916) – John Maynard
- A Hungry Heart (1917)
- The Cinderella Man (1917)
- The Family Honor (1917)
- The Page Mystery (1917)
- Forget Me Not (1917)
- The Auction Block (1917)
- The Venus Model (1918)
- The Marionettes (1918)
- The Glorious Adventure (1918)
- Thirty a Week (1918)
- The Face in the Dark (1918)
- Day Dreams (1919)
- Her Code of Honor (1919)
- Spotlight Sadie (1919)
- The Probation Wife (1919)
- Lord and Lady Algy (1919)
- When Doctors Disagree (1919)
- The World and Its Woman (1919)
- The City of Comrades (1919)
- Heartsease (1919)
- Flame of the Desert (1919)
- The Pest (1919)
- The Butterfly Man (1920)
- The Paliser Case (1920)
- Earthbound (1920)
- Godless Men (1920)
- The Great Moment (1921)
- A Voice in the Dark (1921)
- Courage (1921)
- North of the Rio Grande (1922)
- Beyond the Rocks (1922)
- The Forgotten Law (1922)
- Is Divorce a Failure? (1923)
- The Spider and the Rose (1923)
- The Drivin' Fool (1923)
- The Last Hour (1923)
- A Gentleman of Leisure (1923)
- Mary of the Movies (1923) – cameo
- Three Wise Fools (1923)
- The Gold Diggers (1923)
- The Eternal Three (1923)
- Beau Brummel (1924)
- Listen Lester (1924)
- The Tenth Woman (1924)
- A Fool's Awakening (1924)
- Do It Now (1924)
- Capital Punishment (1925)
- A Thief in Paradise (1925)
- Waking Up the Town (1925)
- Soiled (1925)
- Champion of Lost Causes (1925)
- The Mad Whirl (1925)
- Charley's Aunt (1925)
- Man and Maid (1925)
- The Coast of Folly (1925)
- Where the Worst Begins (1925)
- The Circle (1925)
- Thank You (1925)
- Rose of the World (1925)
- Wandering Footsteps (1925)
- Outwitted (1925)
- The Reckless Sex (1925)
- The Yankee Señor (1926)
- Transcontinental Limited (1926)
- High Steppers (1926)
- Tramp, Tramp, Tramp (1926)
- Pals First (1926)
- 3 Bad Men (1926)
- Forever After (1926)
- The Return of Peter Grimm (1926)
- Camille (1927)
- The Tender Hour (1927)
- Sally in Our Alley (1927)
- The Little Snob (1928)
- The Lion and the Mouse (1928)
- Life's Mockery (1928)
- The Terror (1928)
- The Shepherd of the Hills (1928)
- Evangeline (1929)
- Evidence (1929)
- The Sacred Flame (1929)
- The Mississippi Gambler (1929)
- The Bishop Murder Case (1930)
- The Case of Sergeant Grischa (1930)
- Murder Will Out (1930)
- Outward Bound (1930)
- Feet First (1930)
- Captain Applejack (1931)
- Stout Hearts and Willing Hands (1931)
- Mata Hari (1931) as Major Caron
- Arrowsmith (1931)
- The Last Mile (1932)
- Alias Mary Smith (1932)
- The Last Man (1932)
- Oliver Twist (1933)
- Looking Forward (1933)
- His Private Secretary (1933)
- Alice in Wonderland (1933)
- The Mystery of Mr. X (1934)
