= Heir-Loons =

1925 film

- Directed by: Grover Jones
- Written by: Grover Jones
- Produced by: Grover Jones; Nat H. Spitzer
- Starring: Wallace MacDonald; Edith Roberts; Stuart Holmes
- Production company: Spitzer Productions
- Distributed by: Pathé Exchange
- Release date: August 25, 1925
- Running time: 60 minutes
- Country: United States
- Languages: Silent; English intertitles

Heir-Loons is a 1925 American silent comedy film directed by Grover Jones and starring Wallace MacDonald, Edith Roberts and Stuart Holmes.

== Cast ==
- Wallace MacDonald as George Brockton
- Edith Roberts as Mary Dale
- Cecille Evans as Marjie Trenton
- Frank Campeau as Brockton family member
- Stuart Holmes as Brockton family member
- Snitz Edwards as Brockton family member
- Martha Mattox as Brockton family member
- Emily Gerdes as Brockton family member
- Theodore Lorch
- Sam De Grasse
- Max Asher
- Ralph Lewis
- William H. Turner
- Harry McCoy

== Bibliography ==
- Munden, Kenneth White. The American Film Institute Catalog of Motion Pictures Produced in the United States, Part 1. University of California Press, 1997.
