= The Mad Whirl =

1925 film directed by William A. Seiter

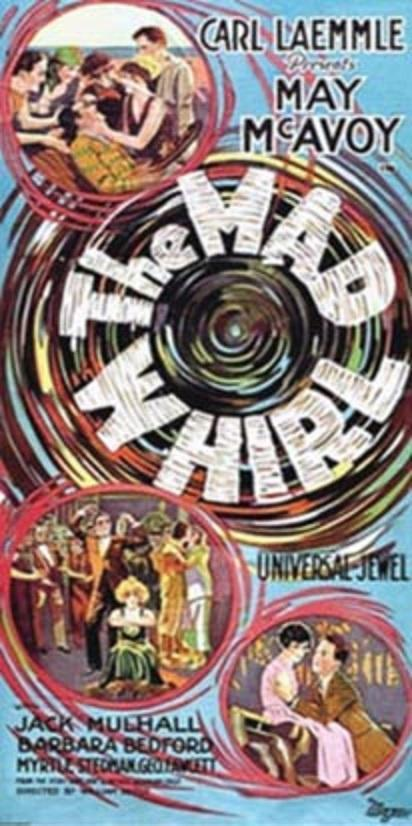
- Theatrical poster
- Directed by: William A. Seiter
- Written by: Edward T. Lowe Jr. Lewis Milestone
- Screenplay by: Adaptation: Fanny Hatton; Frederic Hatton; Intertitles: Harvey Thew
- Based on: Here's How by Richard Washburn Child
- Produced by: Carl Laemmle
- Starring: May McAvoy; Jack Mulhall; Myrtle Stedman; Barbara Bedford
- Cinematography: Merritt B. Gerstad
- Production company: Universal Pictures
- Distributed by: Universal Pictures
- Release date: March 1, 1925 (USA)
- Running time: 80 minutes 35mm, 7 reels
- Country: United States
- Language: Silent (English intertitles)

The Mad Whirl is a 1925 American Jazz Age black-and-white silent drama film about the "loosening of youth morals" that took place during the 1920s. Written by Edward T. Lowe Jr. and Lewis Milestone, and directed by William A. Seiter for Universal Pictures, the film stars May McAvoy and Jack Mulhall. The film was released during the Prohibition era, when the sale of alcoholic drinks in the United States was banned.

== Plot ==
Cathleen Gillis falls in love with Jack Herrington. Martin Gillis, Cathleen's loving father, is stern, very religious, and runs an ice cream shop. Cathleen is an obedient daughter and conservative in her views as well. Jack however, has a routine that includes wild parties hosted by his parents, Gladys and John, who think it is better to be their son's friend by their providing bootleg whiskey and a place to have all-night parties. Jack's lifestyle places him at odds with Cathleen's, but he promises her that he will change his ways. He backslides several times, but in the end is reformed by Cathleen's love, and they elope. After the elopement, Gladys and John get a stern lecture on temperance and sobriety from Martin and reform their ways as well.

== Cast ==
- May McAvoy as Cathleen Gillis
- Jack Mulhall as Jack Herrington
- Myrtle Stedman as Gladys Herrington
- Barbara Bedford as Margie Taylor
- Alec B. Francis as John Herrington
- Ward Crane as Benny Kingsley
- George Fawcett as Martin Gillis
- Marie Astaire as Julia Carling
- Joseph Singleton as Spivens
  With Betty Allen, Charles King, Ellison Manners, William H. O'Brien, Rolfe Sedan, and Grady Sutton.
