= Renown Pictures (1923) =

Renown Pictures was an American film distributor, founded circa 1923, that was the distributor of The Reckless Sex (1925), Pleasures of the Rich (1926), and other films.

== Filmography ==
- A Bride for a Knight (1923), with Billy Quirk
- Waterfront Wolves (1924), with Ora Carew
- Three Days To Live (1924), with Ora Carew
- Getting Her Man (1924), with Ora Carew
- Do It Now (1924)
- Call of the Mate (1924), with William Fairbanks
- The Canvas Kisser (1925)
- Too Much Youth (1925)
- The Reckless Sex (1925)
- Pleasures of the Rich (1926)
