= Ashton Dearholt =

American actor

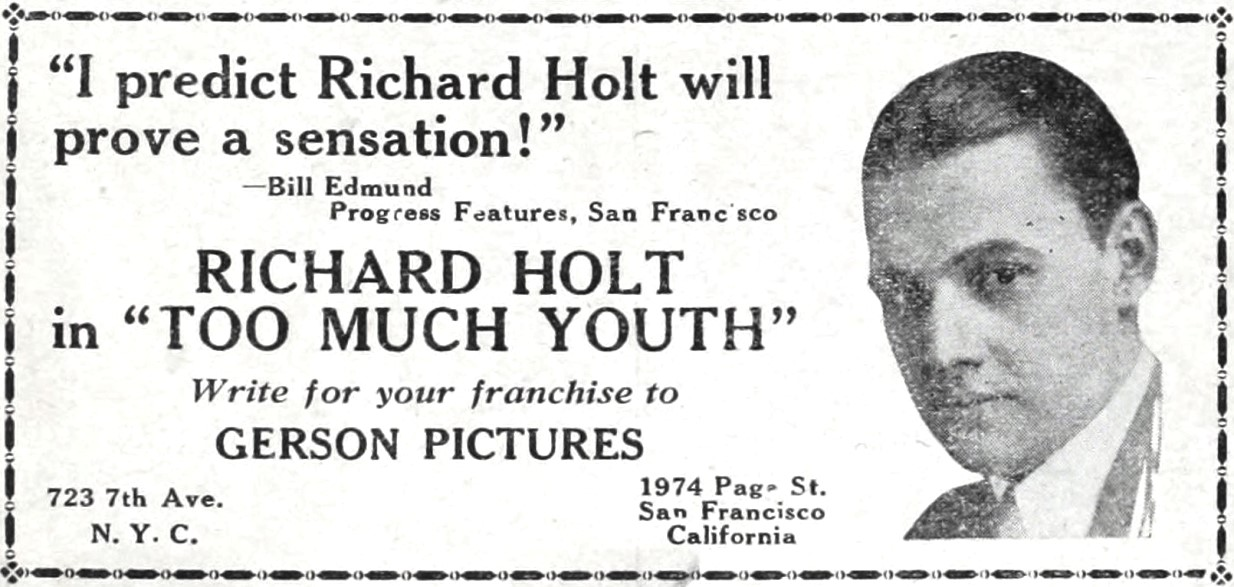
- Dearholt in the advertisement for Too Much Youth (1925) under the name Richard Holt
- Born: April 4, 1894; Milwaukee, Wisconsin, US
- Died: April 27, 1942 (aged 48); Los Angeles, California, US
- Resting place: Hollywood Forever Cemetery
- Other name: Richard Holt
- Occupation: Actor
- Years active: 1915–1938
- Spouse(s): Florence Gilbert (1926–1934) (divorced); Ula Holt (July 1935–April 27, 1942; his death); Helene Rosson (before 1926; divorced)

Ashton Dearholt (April 4, 1894 – April 27, 1942) was an American actor of the silent film era. He appeared in 75 films between 1915 and 1938. He was born in Milwaukee, Wisconsin, and died in Los Angeles, California. He was sometimes billed as Richard Holt.

== Biography ==
Dearholt worked with Universal Studios on a number of melodramas during the 1910s but usually worked outside the studio system, producing and starring in a series of "Pinto Pete" Western during the 1920s. He occasionally acted under the name Richard Holt.

He founded Ashton Dearholt Productions in 1924. Ten years later, Dearholt and Edgar Rice Burroughs founded the film production company Burroughs-Tarzan Enterprises when he was filming The New Adventures of Tarzan. His character in that serial was a mercenary antagonistic explorer sent to steal the valuable Green Goddess.

During its production in Guatemala, Dearholt married the leading actress, Ula Holt, and Burroughs broke up with his first wife to marry Dearholt's ex-wife, Florence Gilbert.

== Partial filmography ==
- To Melody a Soul Responds (1915)
- Purity (1916)
- The Love Hermit (1916)
- Souls in Pawn (1917)
- Charity Castle (1917)
- The Bride's Silence (1917)
- The Bride's Awakening (1918)
- The Two-Soul Woman (1918)
- The Brass Bullet (1918)
- The Luck of Geraldine Laird (1920)
- A Yankee Go Getter (1921)
- At Devil's Gorge (1923)
- Battling Bates (1923)
- The Law Rustlers (1923)
- The Santa Fe Trail (1923)
- Cupid's Rustler (1924)
- Lash of the Whip (1924)
- Western Yesterdays (1924)
- The Diamond Bandit (1924)
- Easy Going Gordon (1925)
- Once in a Lifetime (1925)
- The Canvas Kisser (1925)
- Going the Limit (1925)
- Too Much Youth (1925)
- The Baited Trap (1926)
- Wolves of the Desert (1926)
- West of the Law (1926)
- In Search of a Hero (1926)
- The Boaster (1926)
- A Captain's Courage (1926)
- A Racing Romeo (1927)
- The New Adventures of Tarzan (1935)
- Tundra (1936)
