= Wandering Footsteps =

1925 film directed by Phil Rosen

- Directed by: Phil Rosen
- Written by: Hope Loring; Louis D. Lighton
- Based on: A Wise Son by Charles Sherman
- Starring: Alec B. Francis; Estelle Taylor; Bryant Washburn
- Cinematography: H. Lyman Broening
- Music by: Michael Hoffman
- Production company: Banner Productions
- Distributed by: Henry Ginsberg Distributing Corp.
- Release date: October 23, 1925 (US)
- Running time: 6 reels
- Country: United States
- Language: Silent (English intertitles)

Wandering Footsteps is a 1925 American silent melodrama film directed by Phil Rosen and starring Alec B. Francis, Estelle Taylor, and Bryant Washburn. Based upon the novel A Wise Son by Charles Sherman, it was released on October 23, 1925.

== Plot ==
As described in a film magazine review, an intoxicated young man meets a similarly conditioned old man while wandering in a park and decides to adopt him as his father. The young man's fiancé resents this act and the old man, desirous of seeing the young people happy, goes his way. Later, the men meet again, and this time stay together and help each other find happiness.

== Cast ==
- Alec B. Francis as Timothy Payne
- Estelle Taylor as Helen Maynard
- Bryant Washburn as Hal Whitney
- Eugenie Besserer as Elizabeth Stuyvesant Whitney
- Ethel Wales as Matilda
- Phillips Smalley as Mr. Maynard
- Sidney Bracy as Dobbins
- Frankie Darro as Billy
