= Where the Worst Begins =

1925 film

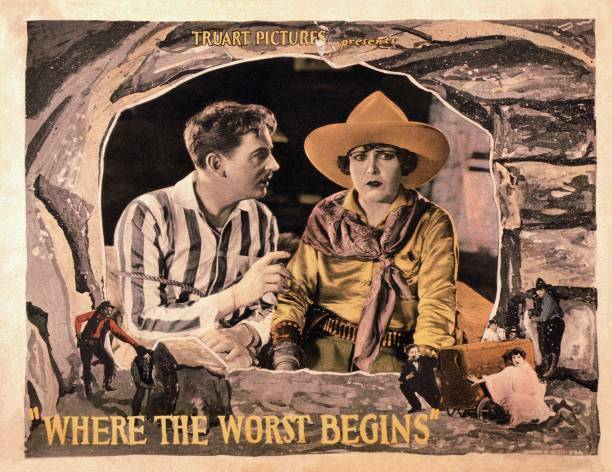
- Lobby card
- Directed by: John McDermott
- Written by: Joseph Anthony Roach; George F. Worts
- Starring: Ruth Roland; Alec B. Francis; Matt Moore
- Cinematography: Byron Haskin
- Edited by: Edward M. McDermott
- Production company: Co-Artists Productions
- Distributed by: Truart Film Corporation
- Release date: November 1, 1925
- Running time: 50 minutes
- Country: United States
- Language: Silent (English intertitles)

Where the Worst Begins is a 1925 American silent Western film directed by John McDermott and starring Ruth Roland, Alec B. Francis, and Matt Moore.

== Plot ==
As described in a film magazine review, a young woman living on a ranch longs to go East, so to obtain money to make the trip kidnaps the son of a wealthy Eastern couple vacationing in the West and holds him for ransom. After the capture, love interest develops between the young people, and the complications that ensue are numerous but are happily terminated.

== Cast ==
- Ruth Roland as Jane Brower
- Alec B. Francis as August Van Dorn
- Matt Moore as Donald Van Dorn
- Grace Darmond as Annice Van Dornn
- Roy Stewart as Cliff Ranger
- Derelys Perdue as Annice's Friend
- Theodore Lorch
- Ernie Adams
- J.P. Lockney
- Bob Burns
- Floyd Shackelford

== Bibliography ==
- Langman, Larry. A Guide to Silent Westerns. Greenwood Publishing Group, 1992. ISBN 0-313-27858-X
