= Tom Gibson (screenwriter) =

American film director

- Born: September 1, 1888; Boston, Massachusetts, U.S.
- Died: December 6, 1950 (aged 62); Burbank, California, U.S.
- Occupations: Screenwriter; Film director
- Years active: 1915-1946

Tom Gibson (September 1, 1888 – December 6, 1950) was an American screenwriter and film director. He wrote for more than 70 films between 1915 and 1946. He also directed 16 films between 1923 and 1937. He was born in Boston, Massachusetts and died in Burbank, California.

== Selected filmography ==
- Bull's Eye (1917)
- The Midnight Man (1917)
- High Speed (1917)
- Wolves of the Street (1920)
- Paying the Limit (1924)
- Getting Her Man (1924)
- West of Arizona (1925)
- Reckless Courage (1925)
- Lightning Reporter (1926)
- Kid Boots (1926)
- The Climbers (1927)
- Thus is Life (1930)
- The Great Adventures of Wild Bill Hickok (1938)
- Covered Wagon Trails (1940)
- Wild Horse Range (1940)
