= Waking Up the Town =

1925 film directed by James Cruze

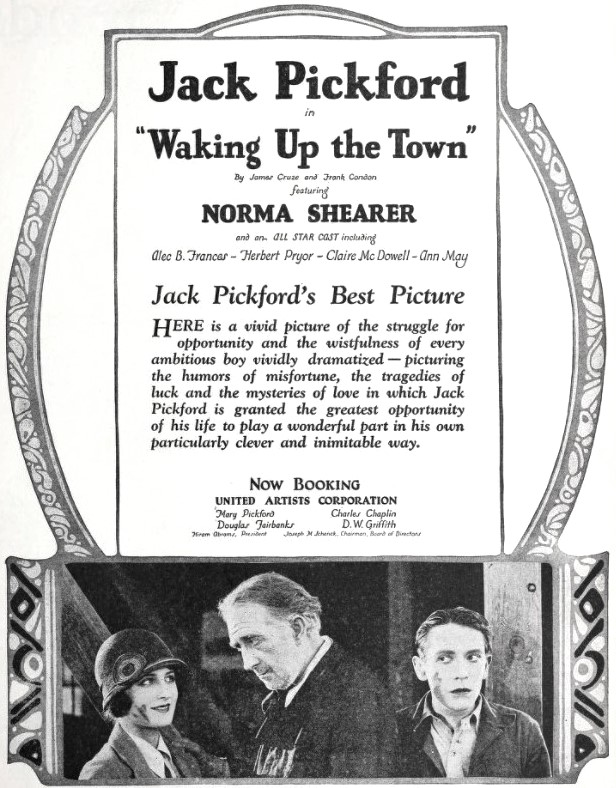
- Advertisement
- Directed by: James Cruze
- Story by: Frank Condon; James Cruze
- Starring: Jack Pickford; Claire McDowell; Alec B. Francis; Norma Shearer; Herbert Prior
- Cinematography: Arthur Edeson; Paul P. Perry
- Production company: Mary Pickford Company
- Distributed by: United Artists
- Release date: April 14, 1925
- Running time: 63 minutes
- Country: United States
- Language: Silent (English intertitles)

Waking Up the Town is a 1925 American silent comedy film directed by James Cruze and written by Frank Condon and James Cruze. The film stars Jack Pickford, Claire McDowell, Alec B. Francis, Norma Shearer, and Herbert Prior. The film was released on April 14, 1925, by United Artists.

== Plot ==
As described in a film magazine review, a garage employee in a small town has an inventive mind, and tries to interest a banker in a project to harness waterfalls for energy. He becomes discouraged. Through the kind assistance of the garage owner, he puts his idea over, and wakes up the town. He has a romance with the granddaughter of his benefactor.

== Cast ==
- Jack Pickford as Jack Joyce
- Claire McDowell as Mrs. Joyce
- Alec B. Francis as Abner Hope
- Norma Shearer as Mary Ellen Hope
- Herbert Prior as Curt Horndyke
- Ann May as Helen Horndyke
- George Dromgold as Joe Lakin
- Jack Edwards as Little Boy (uncredited)

== Preservation ==
The film is preserved in the Library of Congress Collection.
