= The Canvas Kisser =

1925 film

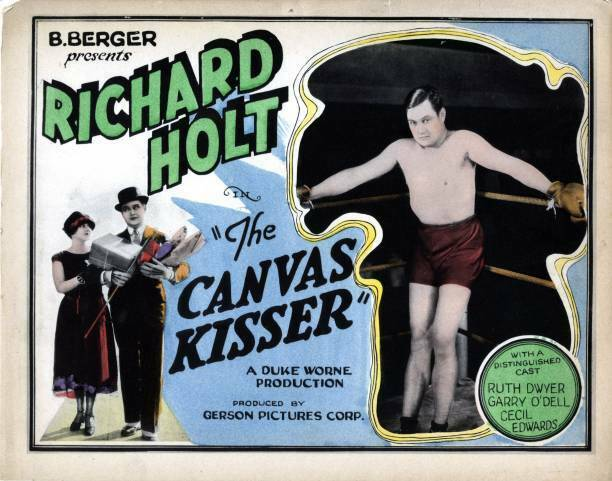
- Directed by: Duke Worne
- Written by: Grover Jones
- Produced by: Paul Gerson
- Starring: Ashton Dearholt; Ruth Dwyer; Edward Cecil
- Cinematography: Alfred Gosden
- Production company: Gerson Pictures
- Distributed by: Renown Pictures
- Release date: June 17, 1925
- Running time: 50 minutes
- Country: United States
- Languages: Silent; English intertitles

The Canvas Kisser is a 1925 American silent sports drama film directed by Duke Worne and starring Ashton Dearholt, Ruth Dwyer and Edward Cecil.

== Synopsis ==
A boxer makes his living by betting on opponents and then deliberately losing to them. However under the influence of a woman he sets out to reform.

== Cast ==
- Ashton Dearholt as Jimmy O'Neil
- Ruth Dwyer as Ruth Harkness
- Garry O'Dell as Crock Wiggins – Jimmy's Manager
- Edward Cecil as Harkness – Ruth's Father

== Bibliography ==
- Munden, Kenneth White. The American Film Institute Catalog of Motion Pictures Produced in the United States, Part 1. University of California Press, 1997. ISBN 9780520209695
