= The Pride of the Force (1925 film) =

1925 film

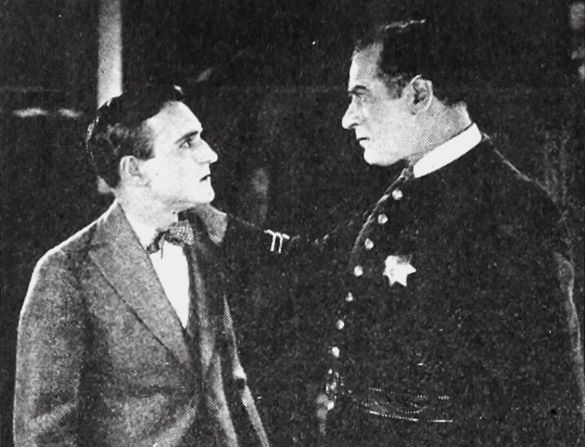
- Still with Morrison and Santschi
- Directed by: Duke Worne
- Written by: Arthur Hoerl
- Produced by: Paul Gerson; W. Ray Johnston
- Starring: Tom Santschi; Gladys Hulette; James W. Morrison
- Production company: Paul Gerson Pictures Corporation
- Distributed by: Rayart Pictures
- Release date: September 11, 1925
- Running time: 55 minutes
- Country: United States
- Language: Silent (English intertitles)

The Pride of the Force is a 1925 American silent action film directed by Duke Worne and starring Tom Santschi, Gladys Hulette, and James W. Morrison.

== Plot ==
As described in a film magazine review, Moore, a patrolman, is in line for a promotion but is denied it because, in the pursuit of a band of thieves, he stops to succor an injured child. He later learns of a crook band's plan to rob the home of a banker and heads a raid against the marauders. As a result, he is made a sergeant. However, he is compelled to arrest his own daughter during the raid. She is accused of being a member of the band, but, in the end, her innocence is established.

== Cast ==
- Tom Santschi as Police Officer Moore
- Gladys Hulette as Mary Moore
- James W. Morrison as Jimmy Moore
- Crauford Kent as Charley Weldon
- Francis X. Bushman Jr. as Jack Griffen
- Joseph W. Girard as Police Captain
- Edythe Chapman as Mother Moore
- Alice Howell as The Girl

== Bibliography ==
- Munden, Kenneth White. The American Film Institute Catalog of Motion Pictures Produced in the United States, Part 1. University of California Press, 1997.
- The Pride of the Force at IMDb
