= He Who Laughs Last (film) =

1925 film

- Directed by: Jack Nelson
- Written by: Grover Jones
- Produced by: Bud Barsky
- Starring: Kenneth MacDonald; David Torrence; Gino Corrado
- Cinematography: Hal Mohr
- Edited by: Grace Harrison; June Harrison
- Production company: Bud Barsky Corporation
- Distributed by: Bud Barsky Corporation; Woolf and Freedman (UK)
- Release date: January 11, 1925
- Running time: 50 minutes
- Country: United States
- Languages: Silent; English intertitles

He Who Laughs Last is a 1925 American silent drama film directed by Jack Nelson and starring Kenneth MacDonald, David Torrence and Gino Corrado.

== Cast ==
- Kenneth MacDonald as Jimmy Taylor
- Margaret Cloud as Janice Marvin
- David Torrence as George K. Taylor
- Gino Corrado as Elwood Harkness
- Harry Northrup as James Marvin

== Bibliography ==
- Connelly, Robert B. The Silents: Silent Feature Films, 1910-36, Volume 40, Issue 2. December Press, 1998.
- Munden, Kenneth White. The American Film Institute Catalog of Motion Pictures Produced in the United States, Part 1. University of California Press, 1997.
