= Too Much Youth =

1925 film

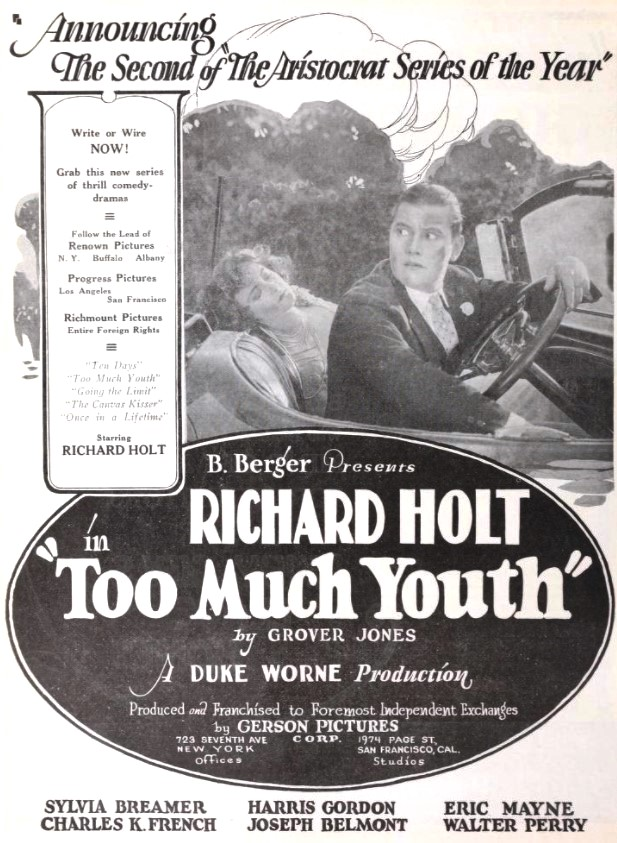
- Directed by: Duke Worne
- Written by: Grover Jones
- Produced by: Paul Gerson
- Starring: Ashton Dearholt; Sylvia Breamer; Eric Mayne
- Cinematography: Roland Price
- Production company: Paul Gerson Pictures Corporation
- Distributed by: Renown Pictures
- Release date: May 7, 1925
- Running time: 50 minutes
- Country: United States
- Language: Silent (English intertitles)

Too Much Youth is a 1925 American silent comedy film directed by Duke Worne and starring Ashton Dearholt, Sylvia Breamer, and Eric Mayne. It was shot at studios in San Francisco and on location in areas around the city.

== Plot ==
As described in a review in a film magazine, Mark Kenton (French) worries about his jazzy son Jimmy (Dearholt), and enlists the aid of Prohibition agent Pat Casey (Belmont). Drunk in a cabaret, Jimmy is attracted by a young woman, Marguerite (Bremmer), and informs her of this and tells her that he will reform. Her escort knocks Jimmy down and he gets locked up. The elder Kenton promises Jimmy that he will get him out of jail if he will seriously undertake a real estate deal for him in San Francisco. Jimmy makes the rash statement that he will close the deal before sleeping. To teach him a lesson, the father calls George Crandall (Mayne), telling him to stall Jimmy for a while. Casey accompanies Jimmy to see that he keeps his work. The youth finds that the daughter, Marguerite Crandall, is the young woman he saw at the cabaret. He later rescues her from a forest fire by driving over a burning bridge as he turns over a new leaf.

== Cast ==
- Ashton Dearholt as Jimmy Kenton (credited as Richard Holt)
- Sylvia Breamer as Marguerite Crandall
- Eric Mayne as George Crandall
- Charles K. French as Mark Kenton
- Walter Leroy as Casey
- Harris Gordon as Ned Crandall
- Walter Perry as Pat Casey
- Joseph Belmont as Francetti

== Preservation ==
With no prints of Too Much Youth located in any film archives, it is a lost film.

== Bibliography ==
- Munden, Kenneth White. The American Film Institute Catalog of Motion Pictures Produced in the United States, Part 1. University of California Press, 1997.
