= Grover Jones =

American screenwriter (1893–1940)

- Born: November 15, 1893; Rosedale, Indiana, USA
- Died: September 24, 1940 (aged 46); Hollywood, California, USA
- Years active: 1920-1940
- Spouse: Susan Avery m.1921-1940
- Children: Sue Sally Jones Hale (b.1937 d.2003)

Grover Jones (November 15, 1893 – September 24, 1940) was an American screenwriter - often teamed with William Slavens McNutt - and film director. He wrote more than 100 films between 1920 and his death. He also was a film journal publisher and prolific short story writer. Jones was born in Rosedale, Indiana, grew up in West Terre Haute, Indiana, and died in Hollywood, California. He was the father of American polo pioneer Sue Sally Hale.

== Selected filmography ==
- Slow as Lightning (1923)
- The Iron Mule (1925)
- Easy Going Gordon (1925)
- He Who Laughs Last (1925)
- The Patent Leather Pug (1925)
- Too Much Youth (1925)
- The Canvas Kisser (1925)
- Heir-Loons (1925)
- A Gentleman Roughneck (1925)
- Going the Limit (1925)
- The Merry Cavalier (1926)
- The Fighting Doctor (1926)
- The Hollywood Reporter (1926)
- Speed Crazed (1926)
- Unknown Dangers (1926)
- The Boaster (1926)
- What a Night! (1928)
- The Virginian (1929)
- Dangerous Paradise (1930)
- Tom Sawyer (1930)
- Huckleberry Finn (1931)
- Ladies of the Big House (1931)
- Trouble in Paradise (1932)
- If I Had a Million (1932)
- One Sunday Afternoon (1933)
- Limehouse Blues (1934)
- Behold My Wife (1934)
- The Lives of a Bengal Lancer (1935)
- The Trail of the Lonesome Pine (1936)
- The Milky Way (1936)
- Souls at Sea (1937)
- 52nd Street (1937)
- Captain Fury (1939)
- Dark Command (1940)
- Abe Lincoln in Illinois (1940)
- Captain Caution (1940)
- One Million B.C. (1940)
- A Girl, a Guy, and a Gob (1941)
- The Shepherd of the Hills (1941) (final film)

== Partial bibliography ==
- Derelict (A novelization; Jacobsen-Hodgkinson Corporation, N.Y. (1930))
- Jones': A Movie Magazine By Movie Makers (Vol. I, Number 1 was August 1937; The (Grover) Jones Press, Pacific Palisades (1937))
- There Were Giants, a Story of Blood and Steel (A novel with William Slavens McNutt; M.S. Mill, N.Y. (1939))
