= Going the Limit (1925 film) =

1925 film

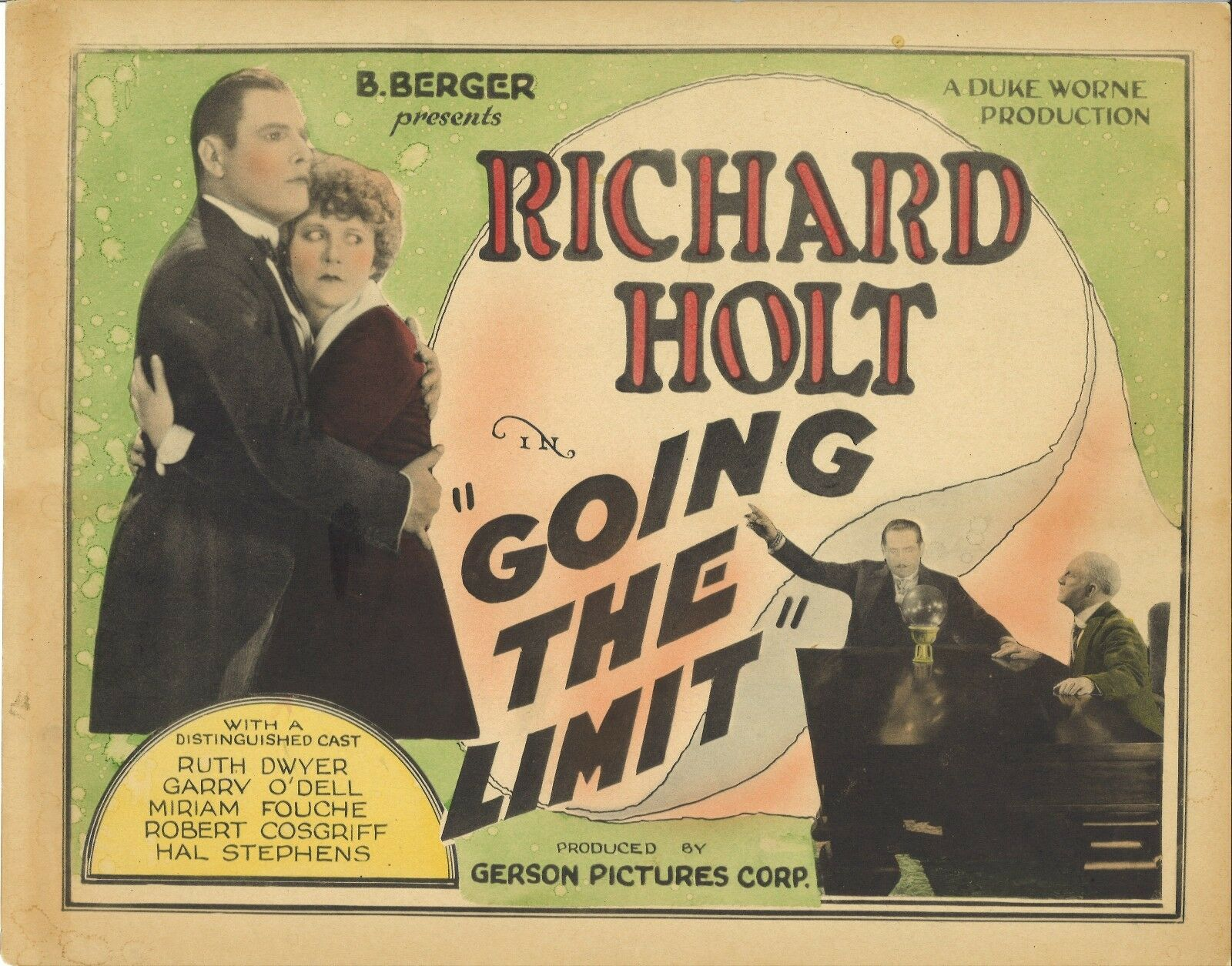
- Directed by: Duke Worne
- Written by: Grover Jones
- Produced by: Paul Gerson
- Starring: Ashton Dearholt; Ruth Dwyer; Garry O'Dell
- Cinematography: Alfred Gosden
- Production company: Gerson Pictures
- Distributed by: Gerson Pictures; Butcher's Film Service (UK)
- Release date: May 25, 1925
- Running time: 50 minutes
- Country: United States
- Languages: Silent; English intertitles

Going the Limit is a 1925 American silent drama film directed by Duke Worne and starring Ashton Dearholt, Ruth Dwyer and Garry O'Dell. It was shot at studios in San Francisco.

== Synopsis ==
A gang gain control over a San Francisco millionaire by posing as clairvoyants. They kidnap his daughter, but are foiled by a young man she is in love with who chases them across the city.

== Cast ==
- Ashton Dearholt as Ted Van Brunt
- Ruth Dwyer as Helen Hayward
- Garry O'Dell as Lung Duck
- Miriam Fouche as Meg
- Robert James Cosgriff as Eddie
- Hal Stephens as Dr. Rosaro
- Rupert Drum as Lorenzo Hayward

== Bibliography ==
- Munden, Kenneth White. The American Film Institute Catalog of Motion Pictures Produced in the United States, Part 1. University of California Press, 1997.
