= Duke Worne =

American film director (1888–1933)

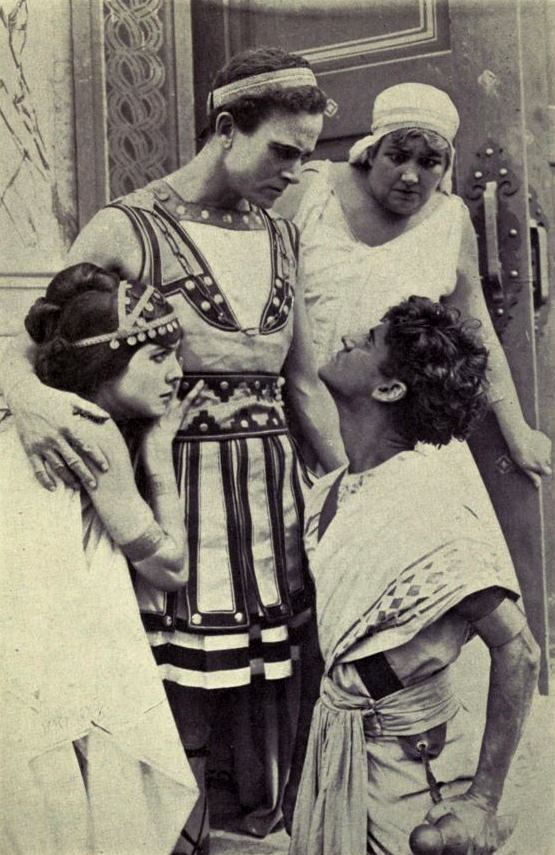
- Still from Damon and Pythias (1914) with Ann Little, Herbert Rawlinson, Duke Worne, and an unidentified actress
- Born: Howard Beasley Worne, Jr. December 14, 1888; Philadelphia, Pennsylvania, U.S.
- Died: October 13, 1933 (aged 44); Los Angeles, California, U.S.
- Occupations: Film director, actor
- Years active: 1914–1931
- Spouse: Virginia Brown Faire (m. 1930)

Howard "Duke" Worne (December 14, 1888 – October 13, 1933) was an American director and actor of the silent era. He directed more than 70 films between 1919 and 1931. He also appeared in 27 films between 1914 and 1928. He was born in Philadelphia, Pennsylvania and died in Los Angeles, California. In 1930, Worne married silent film actress Virginia Brown Faire, to whom he remained married until his death three years later in 1933.

== Selected filmography ==
- Damon and Pythias (1914)
- The Black Box (1915)
- Just Jim (1915)
- The Tornado (1917)
- The Trail of Hate (1917)
- The Scrapper (1917)
- Who Was the Other Man? (1917)
- John Ermine of the Yellowstone (1917)
- The Mystery Ship (1917)
- The Craving (1918)
- The Trail of the Octopus (1919)
- The Screaming Shadow (1920)
- The Blue Fox (1921)
- A Yankee Go Getter (1921)
- Dangerous Paths (1921)
- The Star Reporter (1921)
- Nan of the North (1922)
- The Eagle's Talons (1923)
- The Sword of Valor (1924)
- The Martyr Sex (1924)
- Marry in Haste (1924)
- The Other Kind of Love (1924)
- Do It Now (1924)
- Easy Going Gordon (1925)
- The Canvas Kisser (1925)
- The Pride of the Force (1925)
- Too Much Youth (1925)
- Going the Limit (1925)
- The Gallant Fool (1926)
- Speed Cop (1926)
- The Boaster (1926)
- In Search of a Hero (1926)
- Speed Crazed (1926)
- The Silent Hero (1927)
- The Wheel of Destiny (1927)
- Smiling Billy (1927)
- The Cruise of the Hellion (1927)
- Daring Deeds (1927)
- Heroes in Blue (1927)
- Speedy Smith (1927)
- The Heart of Broadway (1928)
- Into the Night (1928)
- The City of Purple Dreams (1928)
- Ships of the Night (1928)
- Isle of Lost Men (1928)
- The Phantom of the Turf (1928)
- The Man from Headquarters (1928)
- The Midnight Adventure (1928)
- Danger Patrol (1928)
- Bride of the Desert (1929)
- The Devil's Chaplain (1929)
- Anne Against the World (1929)
- Handcuffed (1929)
- Some Mother's Boy (1929)
- When Dreams Come True (1929)
- The Midnight Special (1930)
- The Last Ride (1931)
