= The Greyhound Limited =

1929 film

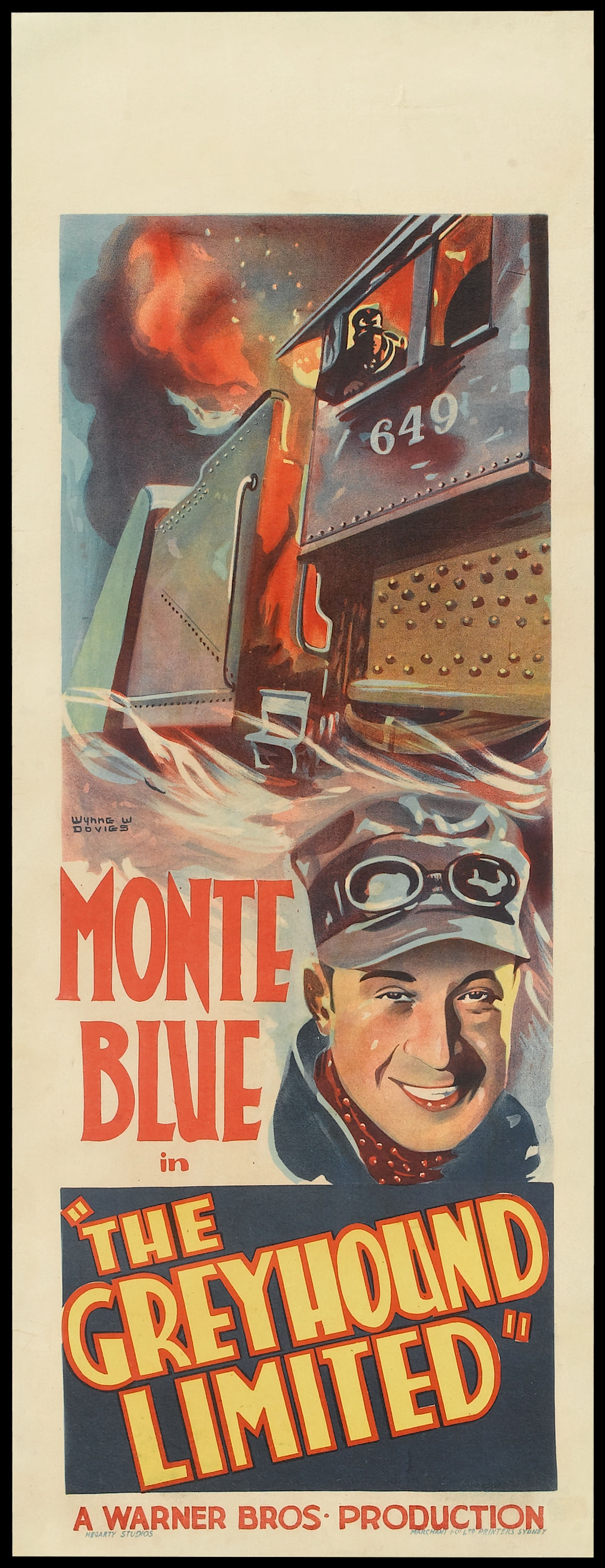
- Theatrical release poster
- Directed by: Howard Bretherton
- Written by: Albert S. Howson (story); Anthony Coldeway; Robert Lord (writer); Joseph Jackson (titles)
- Starring: Monte Blue; Edna Murphy; Grant Withers
- Cinematography: Ben Reynolds
- Production company: Warner Bros. Pictures
- Distributed by: Warner Bros. Pictures
- Release date: February 9, 1929
- Running time: 86 minutes 8 reels 6,114 feet
- Languages: Sound (Part-Talkie); English Intertitles

The Greyhound Limited is a 1929 part-talkie crime drama and railroad theme film directed by Howard Bretherton and starring Monte Blue. In addition to sequences with audible dialogue or talking sequences, the film features a synchronized musical score and sound effects along with English intertitles. The soundtrack was recorded using the Vitaphone sound-on-disc system. The film was produced and distributed by Warner Bros. Pictures. The film is a follow-up to the 1927 film The Black Diamond Express.

The film survives in the Library of Congress and Wisconsin Center For Film and Theatre Research, Madison Wisconsin. The full soundtrack survives on seven Vitaphone discs at UCLA.

== Cast ==
- Monte Blue as Monte
- Edna Murphy as Edna
- Grant Withers as Bill
- Lucy Beaumont as Mrs. Williams, Bill's mother
- Ernie Shields as Limpy
- Lew Harvey as The Rat

== See also ==
- List of early sound feature films (1926–1929)
- List of early Warner Bros. sound and talking features
