= Jane Jennings =

American actress

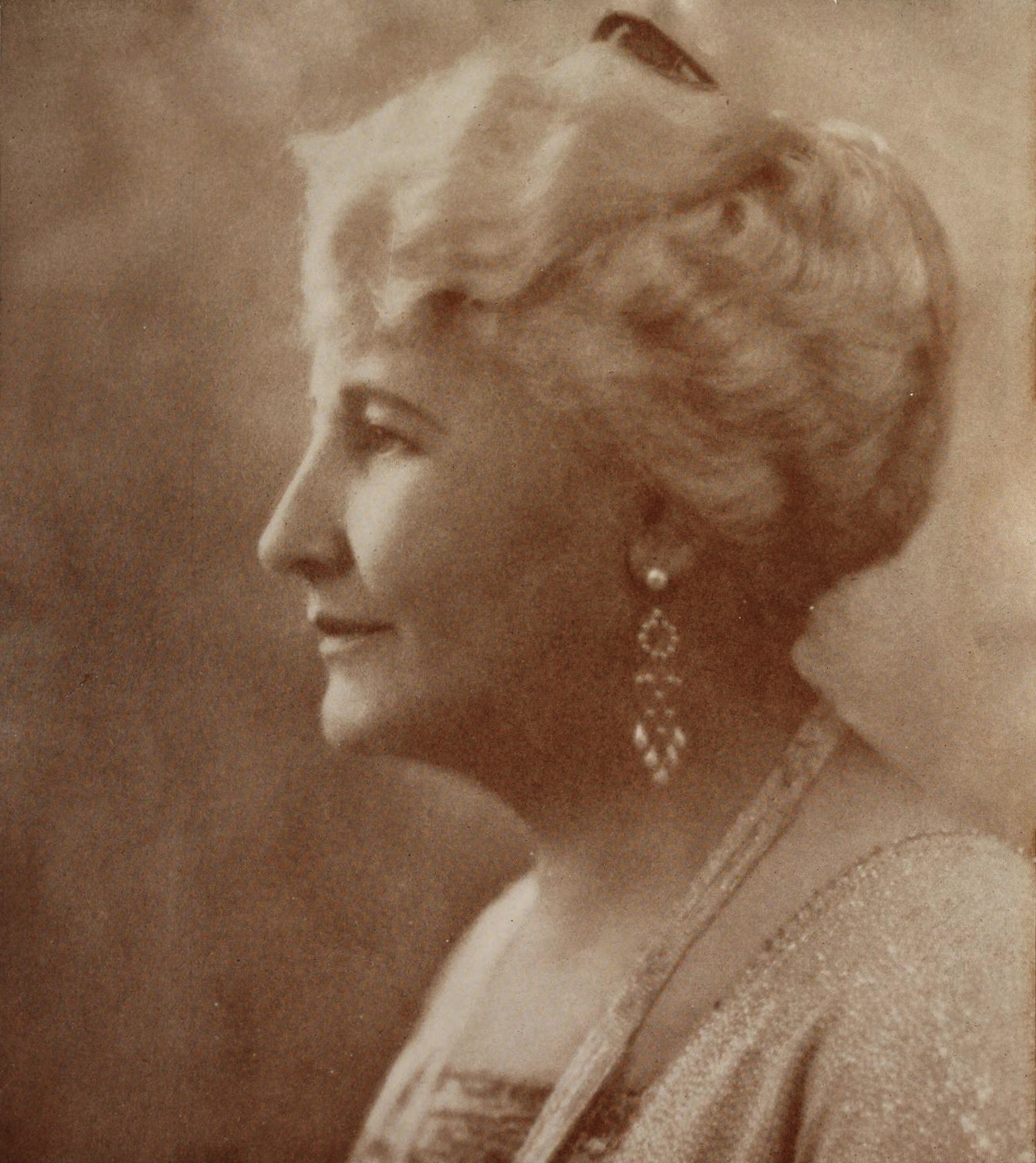
Jane Jennings

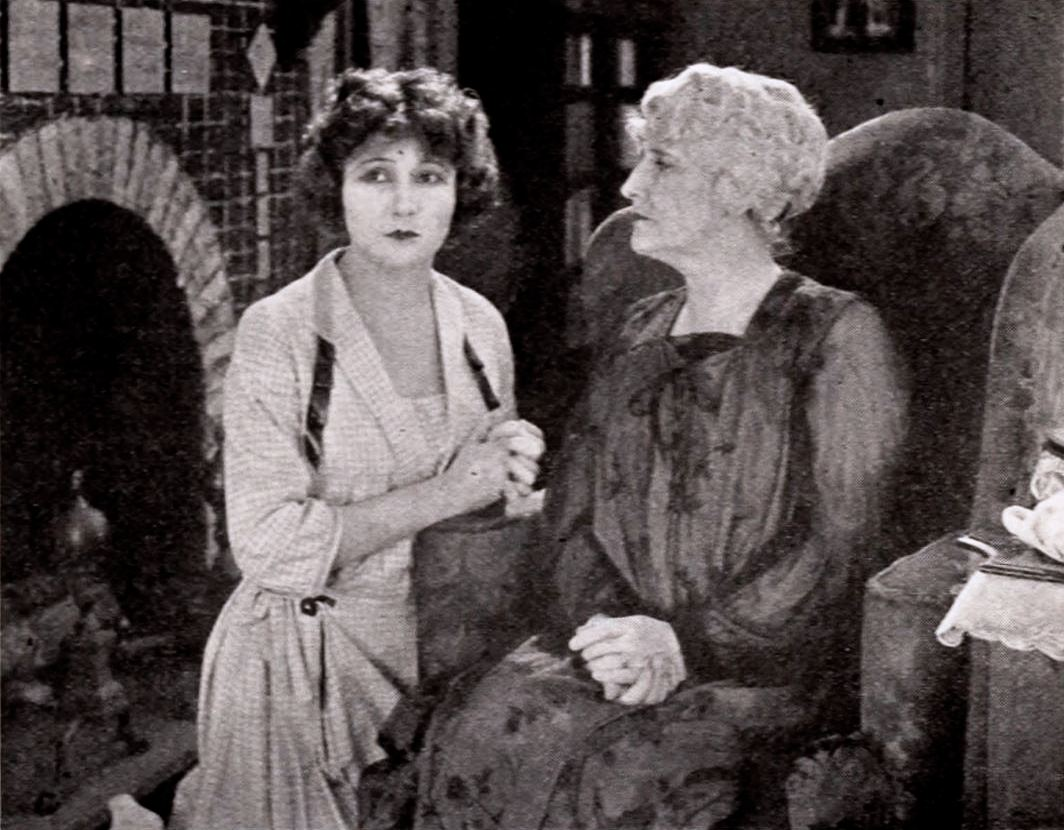
Jennings (on right) in still from A Pasteboard Crown (1922)

Jane Jennings was an American actress known for playing older motherly characters. In a 1918 edition of Motion Picture News she is described as a sweet looking little woman. Famous Players was one of the studios where she worked. She is on the cover of the sheet music for That Wonderful Mother of Mine (1918). By the 1925 film Self Defense, she had played 178 mother roles in films.

== Filmography ==
- I Want to Forget (1918)
- The Girl Who Came Back (1918)
- I Love You Just the Same, Sweet Adeline (1919)
- The Woman Under Oath (1919)
- As a Man Thinks (1919)
- The Climbers (1919) as Aunt Ruth
- The Lion and the Mouse (1919) as Mrs. Ryder
- The Cost (1920)
- His House in Order (1920)
- The Gilded Lily (1921)
- What Women Will Do (1921) as Mrs. Wade
- The Case of Becky (1921) as Mrs. Arnold
- The Inner Chamber (1921) as Mrs. Robson
- What's Your Reputation Worth? (1921) as Mrs. Pettus
- The Heart of Maryland (1921) as Mrs. Claiborne
- Haldane of the Secret Service (1923)
- Broadway Rose (1922) as Mrs. Lawrence
- A Pasteboard Crown (1922) as Mrs. Lawton
- The Challenge (1922) as Mrs. Hastings
- The Darling of the Rich (1922) as Jane Winship
- The Go-Getter (1923)
- Trouping with Ellen (1924) as Tony's Mother
- A Man Must Live (1925) as Mrs. Ross-Fayne
- The Little French Girl (1925)
- Self Defense (1925)
- Enemies of Youth (1925)
- False Pride (1925)
- The Romance of a Million Dollars (1926)
- Broken Homes (1926)
- The Virgin Wife (1926) as Virginia Jamieson
- The Song and Dance Man (1926) as Ma Carroll
- Burnt Fingers (1927) as Mrs. Cabell
- Faithless Lover (1928) as Mrs. Seeton
