= Lewis Allen Browne =

American screenwriter

- Born: January 18, 1876; North Sandwich, New Hampshire, U.S.
- Died: May 24, 1937 (aged 61); Englewood, New Jersey, U.S.
- Occupation: Screenwriter
- Years active: 1918–1927

Lewis Allen Browne (January 18, 1876 – May 24, 1937) was an American screenwriter of the silent era. Prior to screenwriting, Browne was a journalist, including 11 years as city editor at the Boston Journal.

== Selected filmography ==
- The Dangerous Paradise (1920)
- The Road of Ambition (1920)
- Marooned Hearts (1920)
- A Man of Stone (1921)
- The Way of a Maid (1921)
- Clay Dollars (1921)
- Poor, Dear Margaret Kirby (1921)
- The Highest Law (1921)
- Handcuffs or Kisses (1921)
- Society Snobs (1921)
- The Snitching Hour (1922)
- Reported Missing (1922)
- The Referee (1922)
- John Smith (1922)
- The Prophet's Paradise (1922)
- Why Announce Your Marriage? (1922)
- Shadows of the Sea (1922)
- The Man from M.A.R.S. (1922)
- The Love Bandit (1924)
- The Law and the Lady (1924)
- Roulette (1924)
- False Pride (1925)
- The Wrongdoers (1925)
- Broken Homes (1926)
- Wives at Auction (1926)
- The Virgin Wife (1926)
- Casey of the Coast Guard (1926)
- The Truth About Men (1926)
- Naughty but Nice (1927)

== Bibliography ==
- John T. Soister, Henry Nicolella & Steve Joyce. American Silent Horror, Science Fiction and Fantasy Feature Films, 1913-1929. McFarland, 2014.
