= Shadows of the North =

1923 film by Robert F. Hill

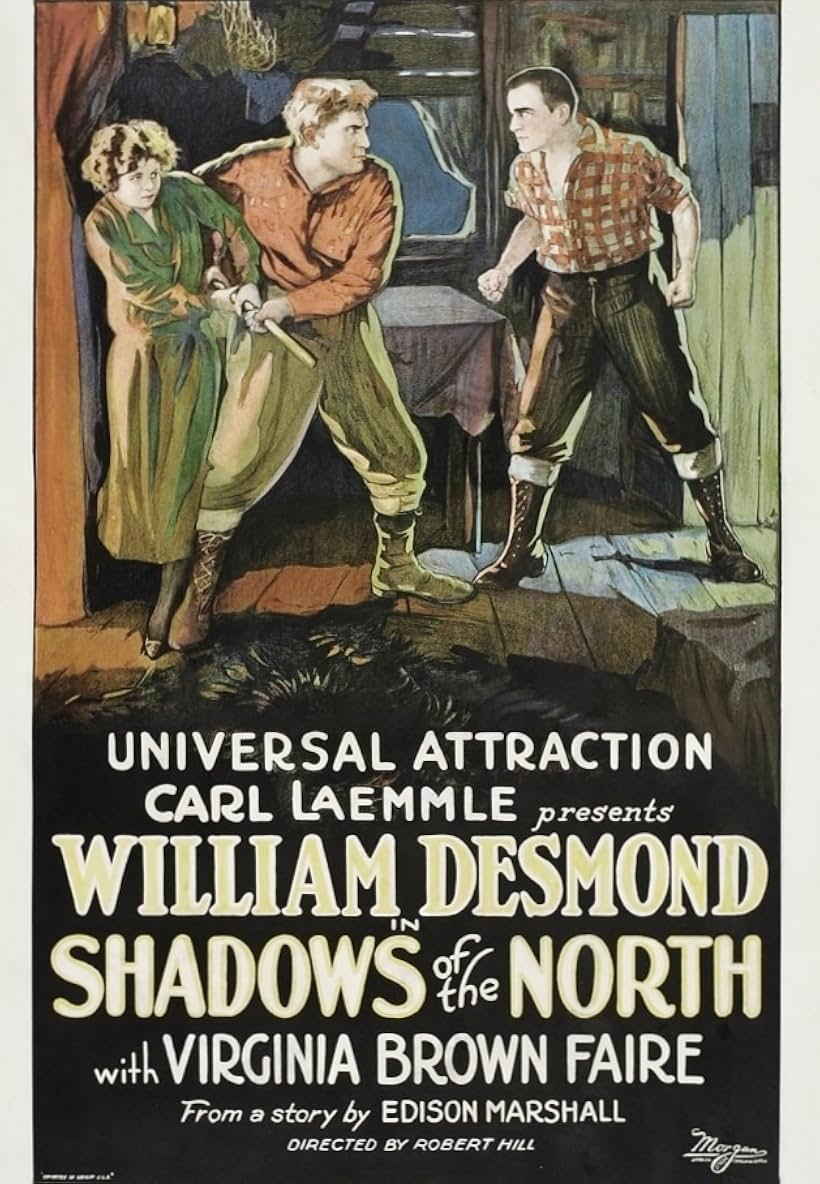
- Theatrical release poster
- Directed by: Robert F. Hill
- Screenplay by: Paul Schofield
- Starring: William Desmond; Virginia Brown Faire; Fred Kohler; William Welsh; Al Hart; James O. Barrows
- Cinematography: Harry M. Fowler
- Production company: Universal Pictures
- Distributed by: Universal Pictures
- Release date: August 27, 1923
- Running time: 50 minutes
- Country: United States
- Language: Silent (English intertitles)

Shadows of the North is a lost 1923 American silent adventure film directed by Robert F. Hill and written by Paul Schofield. The film stars William Desmond, Virginia Brown Faire, Fred Kohler, William Welsh, Al Hart, James O. Barrows and the canine star Rin Tin Tin.

The film was released by Universal Pictures on August 27, 1923.

== Plot ==
In northwest Canada, Ben “Wolf” Darby is co-owner of a valuable mining claim with his elderly father, Ezra “Pancake” Darby. Before the claim can be fully developed, Ben leaves for military service overseas, placing Pancake in charge of protecting the property and its paperwork. During Ben’s absence, a trio of claim jumpers seize the mine and establish themselves as the new “owners.” The trespassers include Jeffrey Neilson—father of Ben’s sweetheart, Beatrice Neilson—and Ray Brent, a persistent rival for Beatrice’s affection. When Ben returns, he finds Pancake isolated and under pressure. Father and son begin planning a strategy to reclaim the mine through direct confrontation and legal proof of ownership. Before they can act, Pancake is murdered, eliminating the claim’s last on-site defender and hardening Ben’s determination to punish those responsible. Driven by grief and vengeance, Ben abducts Beatrice, intending to use her as leverage and to make her family suffer for the theft of his property. As the two travel through the harsh northern wilderness, Beatrice insists she had no knowledge of the takeover and that her father was not involved in Pancake’s killing. Ben’s anger begins to give way to doubt as he recognizes her sincerity and separates her personal innocence from the men occupying the claim. Ben ultimately confronts the claim jumpers, clears Jeffrey Neilson of responsibility for Pancake’s murder, and succeeds in winning back legal and physical control of the mine. With the dispute resolved and Beatrice freed from suspicion in Ben’s mind, Ben and Beatrice reconcile and marry, bringing the feud to a close.

== Cast ==
- William Desmond as Ben 'Wolf' Darby
- Virginia Brown Faire as Beatrice Neilson
- Fred Kohler as Ray Brent
- William Welsh as Jeffrey Neilson
- Al Hart as Hemingway
- James O. Barrows as Ezra 'Pancake' Darby
- Rin Tin Tin as King, the dog
