= The White Dove (1920 film) =

1920 film

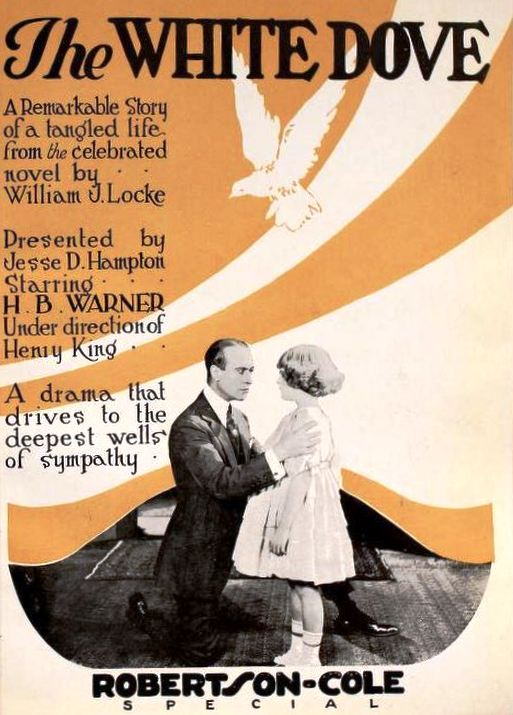
- Advertisement
- Directed by: Henry King
- Based on: The White Dove by William J. Locke
- Produced by: Jesse D. Hampton
- Starring: H.B. Warner; James O. Barrows; Claire Adams
- Production company: Jesse D. Hampton Productions
- Distributed by: Robertson-Cole Distributing Corporation
- Release date: March 28, 1920
- Running time: 50 minutes
- Country: United States
- Language: Silent (English intertitles)

The White Dove is a 1920 American silent drama film directed by Henry King and starring H.B. Warner, James O. Barrows, and Claire Adams.

== Cast ==
- H.B. Warner as Sylvester Lanyon
- James O. Barrows as Matthew Lanyon
- Claire Adams as Ella De Fries
- Herbert Greenwood as Ebenezer Usher
- Donald MacDonald as Roderick Usher
- Virginia Lee Corbin as Dorothy Lanyon
- Ruth Renick as Constance Lanyon

== Preservation status ==
An incomplete copy of the film is held by the French archive Centre national du cinéma et de l'image animée in Fort de Bois-d'Arcy.

== Bibliography ==
- Donald W. McCaffrey & Christopher P. Jacobs. Guide to the Silent Years of American Cinema. Greenwood Publishing, 1999. ISBN 0-313-30345-2
