= Cause for Divorce (1923 film) =

1923 silent film

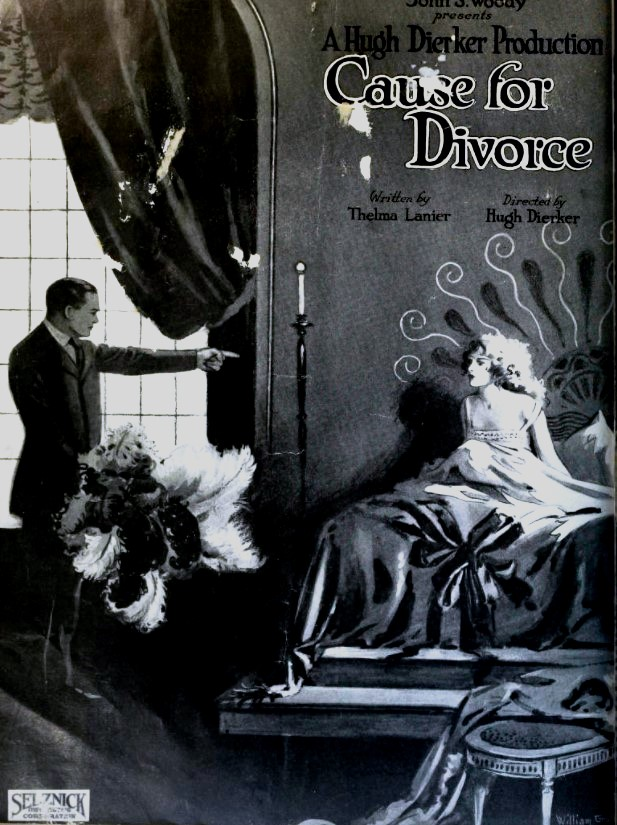
- Directed by: Hugh Dierker
- Written by: Thelma Lanier; Dorothy Yost
- Produced by: Hugh Dierker
- Starring: Fritzi Brunette; Helen Lynch; Pat O'Malley
- Cinematography: Victor Milner
- Production company: Hugh Dierker Productions
- Distributed by: Selznick Pictures
- Release date: October 6, 1923
- Running time: 78 minutes
- Country: United States
- Language: Silent (English intertitles)

Cause for Divorce is a 1923 American silent drama film directed by Hugh Dierker and starring Fritzi Brunette, Helen Lynch, and Pat O'Malley.

== Plot ==
As described in a film magazine review, Tom Parker's wife Laura, concerned because he does not devote enough time to her, narrowly escapes from being involved in a love affair with the wealthy Martin Sheldon. Martin's daughter Ruth, married to the young lawyer Howard Metcliffe, is dissatisfied with her marriage and plans an elopement with the Count Lorenz, who is a crook. When Ruth's automobile is involved in an accident and she is injured, she is brought to the nearest domicile, which is Laura's house. Ruth's father Martin comes, and is thunderstruck when he finds Laura there. After some discussions and reconsiderations, the domestic affairs are resolved all around for the two marriages.

== Cast ==
- Helen Lynch as Ruth Metcliffe
- Fritzi Brunette as Laura Parker
- Pat O'Malley as Howard Metcliffe
- James O. Barrows as Prof. Williams
- Peter Burke as 'Count' Lorenz
- David Butler as Tom Parker
- Charles Clary as Martin Sheldon
- Frank Coghlan Jr. as Tommie Parker
- Harmon MacGregor as George Angier
- Cleve Moore as Skippy North

== Bibliography ==
- Munden, Kenneth White. The American Film Institute Catalog of Motion Pictures Produced in the United States, Part 1. University of California Press, 1997.
