= Oh, You Women! =

1919 film by John Emerson

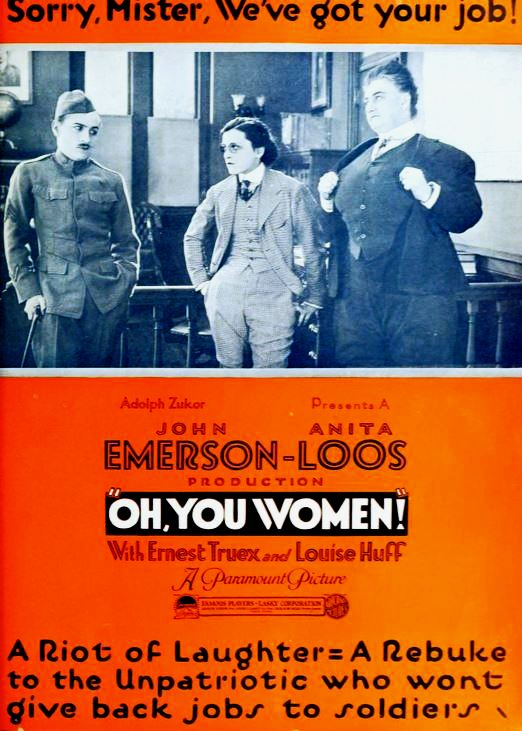
- Advertisement for film
- Directed by: John Emerson
- Screenplay by: John Emerson; Anita Loos
- Produced by: Adolph Zukor; John Emerson; Anita Loos
- Starring: Ernest Truex; Joseph Burke; Bernard Randall; Gaston Glass; Louise Huff; Betty Wales
- Cinematography: Jacques Montéran (French Wikipedia)
- Production companies: Famous Players–Lasky Corporation; John Emerson & Anita Loos Productions
- Distributed by: Paramount Pictures
- Release date: May 4, 1919
- Running time: 50 minutes
- Country: United States
- Language: Silent (English intertitles)

Oh, You Women! is a 1919 American silent comedy film directed by John Emerson and written by Emerson and Anita Loos. The film stars Ernest Truex, Joseph Burke, Bernard Randall, Gaston Glass, Louise Huff, and Betty Wales. It was released on May 4, 1919, by Paramount Pictures. Oh, You Women! is currently considered a lost film. The film, that had 5 reels, was "about soldiers returning home from the First World War in 1919".

== Plot ==
As reported in a film magazine, orator Abraham Lincoln Jones works at the mayor's office, emulating his namesake and confident in his future rise to the mayor's position. However, the war took him away, mussed him up, and shot him back home on sick leave. He finds the home town is not the same. A couple of "Women's Rights" specialists had vested and panted the female populous, while males were minding the babies and doing housework. One young woman retained frills and furbelows, the dreaded dressmaker's daughter. Abe takes hold of the town and young woman and proves himself a man.

== Cast ==
- Ernest Truex as Abraham Lincoln Jones
- Joseph Burke as Joe Bush
- Bernard Randall as Alec Smart
- Gaston Glass as Jimmy Johnson
- Louise Huff as Mary Shelby
- Betty Wales as Ethel Johnson
- Merceita Esmond as Alice Wilson
- Ida Fitzhugh as Aurora Noyes
- Josephine Stevens as Lotta Noyes
