= Capital Punishment (film) =

1925 film

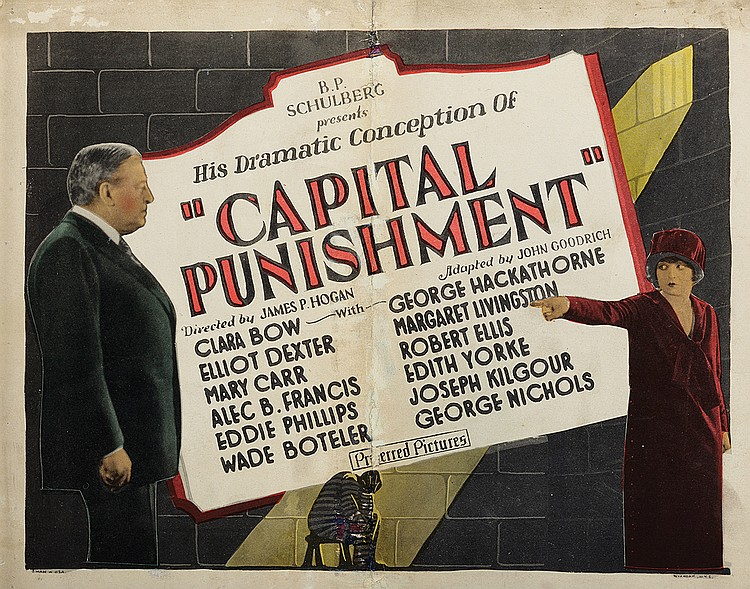
- Directed by: James P. Hogan
- Written by: John F. Goodrich
- Based on: a story by B. P. Schulberg
- Produced by: B. P. Schulberg
- Starring: Clara Bow; George Hackathorne; Elliott Dexter; Margaret Livingston; Mary Carr
- Cinematography: Joseph Goodrich
- Distributed by: Preferred Pictures
- Release date: January 1, 1925
- Running time: 6 reels
- Country: United States
- Language: Silent (English intertitles)

Capital Punishment is a 1925 American silent melodrama film directed by James P. Hogan and starring Clara Bow, Margaret Livingston, Mary Carr, and Elliott Dexter. It was produced by B. P. Schulberg and is now in the public domain. It was written and produced with the intent of challenging the viewing public question the use of capital punishment.

== Plot ==
As described in a review in a film magazine, a prologue shows a youth, wrongly convicted of murder, is placed in an electric chair with the Governor frantically attempting to call it off, ending with the throwing of a switch to show the electrocution taking place. In the main story, Gordon Harrington wagers Harry Phillips that he can have an innocent convicted of murder. He persuades Dan O'Connor, a youth who has been in trouble with the police but has reformed, to be the subject of the experiment. Dan needs the money for his mother and also wants to marry Delia Tate. Phillips disappears and is reported murdered. Dan is arrested when he pawns articles bearing Phillips’ monogram, and is convicted based upon circumstantial evidence. In the meantime, Phillips and Harrington have fought over Mona Caldwell, and when the latter is accidentally killed, Mona persuades Harrington to let Dan pay the penalty rather than risk execution himself. Dan, Della, and a friendly policeman attempt to locate Harrington, and at last, the Prison Warden gets Harrington on the telephone. Dan, flabbergasted when Harrington denies knowledge of any experiment, becomes a terror stricken boy overwhelmed by the injustice and inevitableness of it all. Dan's death impends when Mona confesses to the Governor, and a repentant Harrington pounds the prison gates. The governor saves him in the nick of time, but Dan is a wreck of a human being and must be held and nursed back before he can forget what almost happened.

== Cast ==
- Clara Bow as Delia Tate
- George Hackathorne as Dan O'Connor
- Elliott Dexter as Gordon Harrington
- Margaret Livingston as Mona Caldwell
- Mary Carr as Mrs. O'Connor
- Robert Ellis as Harry Phillips
- Alec B. Francis as Chaplain
- Eddie Phillips as Condemned Boy
- Edith Yorke as Boys Mother
- Joseph Kilgour as Governor
- Wade Boteler as Officer Dugan
- George Nichols as Prison Warden
- John T. Prince as Doctor (credited as John Prince)
- Fred Warren as Pawnbroker
- Sailor Sharkey as Convict

== Preservation ==
Prints of Capital Punishment are held at the Filmmuseum in Amsterdam and the UCLA Film and Television Archive.
