= The Danger Signal (1925 film) =

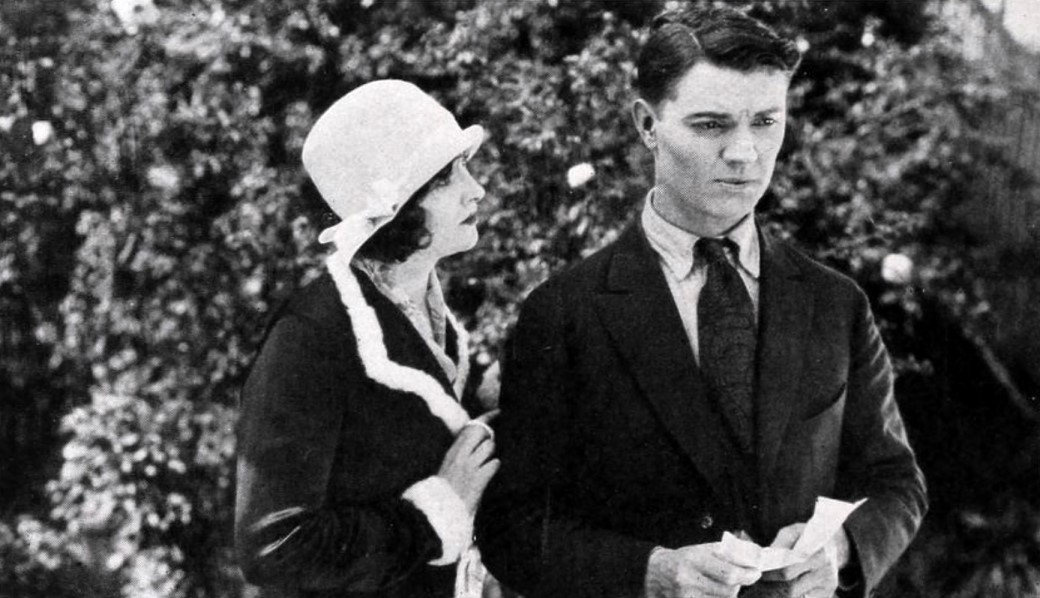
- Still from the film
- Directed by: Erle C. Kenton
- Written by: Douglas Z. Doty
- Starring: Jane Novak; Dorothy Revier; Robert Edeson; Gaston Glass
- Cinematography: Dewey Wrigley
- Production company: Columbia Pictures
- Distributed by: Columbia Pictures
- Release date: July 1, 1925
- Running time: 6 reels
- Country: United States
- Language: Silent (English intertitles)

The Danger Signal is a 1925, melodrama film directed by Erle C. Kenton. The film survives in an incomplete form at the Library of Congress.

== Plot ==
As described in a film magazine, the story starts in 1904 with the railroad president refusing to have anything to do with the widow of his son who had eloped the year before. He agrees, however, to bring up her baby, not knowing that she is the mother of twins. She gives one of them over to his keeping and changes her name.

20 years later finds both boys working for the railroad, .the grandfather’s ward,. spoiled and shiftless, as a district assistant superintendent, and his brother, unbeknown to him, as a fireman at the same junction. The twins come to conflict over the girl in the case and the poorer one underservedly loses his job. Affairs are finally righted and the grandfather realizes that the boy brought up in poverty but with a mother’s love has made & much better man than the one with everything in the world but maternal affection.

In the scene, a runaway engine approaches a passenger express coming from the opposite direction. Robert Gordon jumps onto a motorcycle, rides ahead of the locomotive along the tracks, and dismounts to operate the final track switch. The runaway engine is redirected to a side track and hits a baggage car, allowing the express train to pass safely.

== Cast ==
- Jane Novak as Mary Browning
- Dorothy Revier as Laura Whitman
- Robert Edeson as Cyprus Browning
- Gaston Glass as Ralph Browning
- Robert Gordon as Robert Browning
- Mayme Kelso as Mrs. Whitman
- Lee Shumway as John Moran

== Reception ==
George T. Hardy of Motion Picture News gave the film a positive review, saying that it "registers far above average feature" an "is well produced in every respect".
