= The Sap (1929 film) =

1929 film

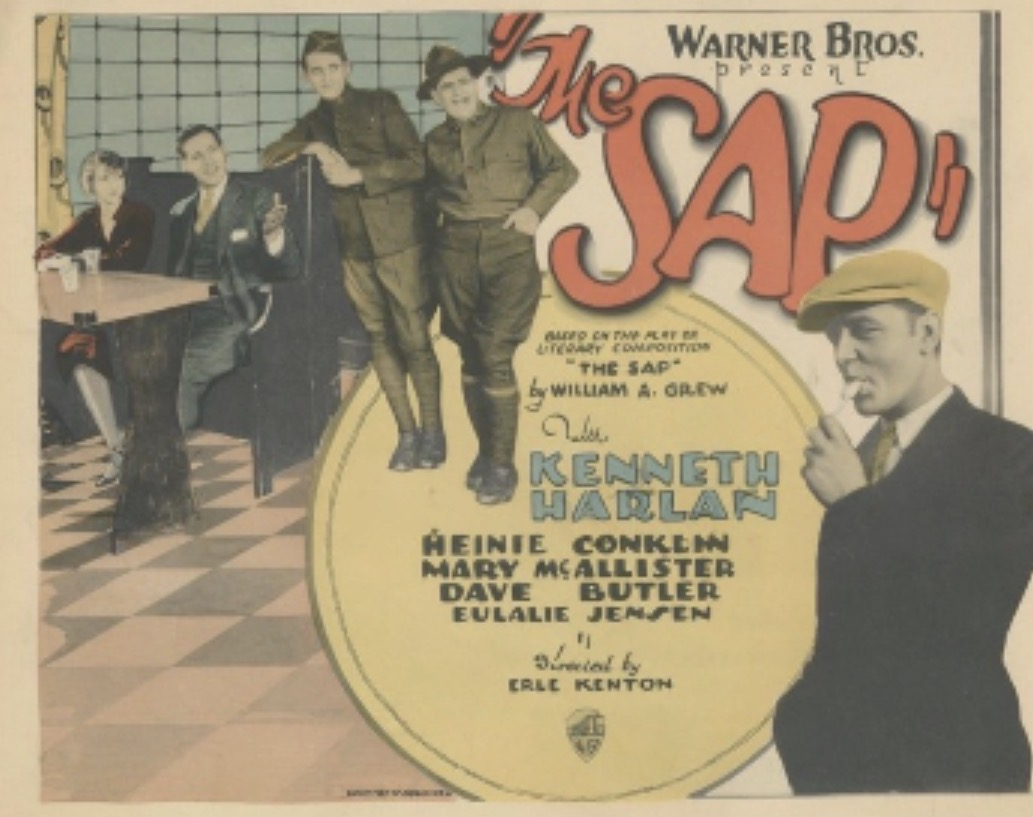
- Directed by: Archie Mayo
- Screenplay by: De Leon Anthony; Robert Lord
- Based on: The Sap by William A. Grew
- Starring: Edward Everett Horton; Alan Hale Sr. Patsy Ruth Miller; Russell Simpson; Jerry Mandy; Edna Murphy
- Cinematography: Devereaux Jennings
- Edited by: Desmond O'Brien
- Production company: Warner Bros. Pictures
- Distributed by: Warner Bros. Pictures
- Release date: November 9, 1929
- Running time: 80 minutes
- Country: United States
- Languages: Sound (Part-Talkie); English Intertitles

The Sap is a 1929 American All-Talking sound comedy film directed by Archie Mayo and written by De Leon Anthony and Robert Lord. The soundtrack was recorded using the Vitaphone sound-on-disc system. The film is based on the 1924 play The Sap by William A. Grew. The film stars Edward Everett Horton, Alan Hale Sr., Patsy Ruth Miller, Russell Simpson, Jerry Mandy and Edna Murphy. The film was released by Warner Bros. Pictures on November 9, 1929.

== Plot ==
Bill Small is known as “The Sap” in the small town of Union Falls, South Dakota. A harmless dreamer, Bill is always on the verge of a breakthrough invention, but nothing ever materializes. His workshop is filled with junk, and his mind with impractical ideas. The only person who truly believes in him is his devoted wife, Betty, though she struggles to defend him from constant ridicule by her sister Jane and brother-in-law Ed Mason, with whom they share a home.

Jim Belden, the local bank cashier, is a close family friend and has more than a passing interest in Jane. Into this quiet, ordinary life comes a shock: Ed confides in desperation that he has been speculating with the bank's money and is now $10,000 short in his accounts.

Horrified, the family scrambles for a solution. Bill, the underestimated "Sap," offers to take responsibility for the crisis. Acting on a hunch, he summons Jim and confronts him about also misusing the bank's funds. Under pressure, Jim confesses—he is short by $22,000 due to his own failed speculation.

Meanwhile, Betty has nearly reached the end of her patience with Bill. When he humiliates her in public by ruining the town banker Sprague's shoes with his experimental polish, she tells him their relationship is over. But Bill has one last idea. Since he is already a local joke and planning to leave town, he suggests that Ed and Jim give him $50,000 more. He will flee town under the guise of a bank hold-up, taking all the blame on his shoulders.

They agree. Bill takes the money and disappears.

Some time passes. Though the accounts have been juggled to conceal the embezzlement, Ed and Jim are close to being exposed and prepare to flee town. At the last minute, they receive a telegram from Bill, now in New York, telling them to stay put, because he has bought the bank and is returning a millionaire. He had used the $50,000 to successfully play the stock market. When he returns to Union Falls, the once-mocked “Sap” is now a hero. The entire town turns out to celebrate him with a parade, speeches, and much fanfare.

He promptly fires Sprague as bank president and takes over the institution himself. In a final act of forgiveness and transformation, Bill reconciles with Betty, and even forgives Ed and Jane, the in-laws who once mocked him. The former "Sap" is now the town's most admired man.

== Cast ==
- Edward Everett Horton as The Sap, Bill Small
- Alan Hale Sr. as Jim Belden
- Patsy Ruth Miller as Betty, Bill's wife
- Russell Simpson as The Banker
- Jerry Mandy as The Wop
- Edna Murphy as Jane
- Louise Carver as Mrs. Sprague
- Franklin Pangborn as Ed Mason, Bill's brother-in-law

== See also ==
- List of early sound feature films (1926–1929)
