= Pawned (film) =

1922 film directed by Irvin Willat

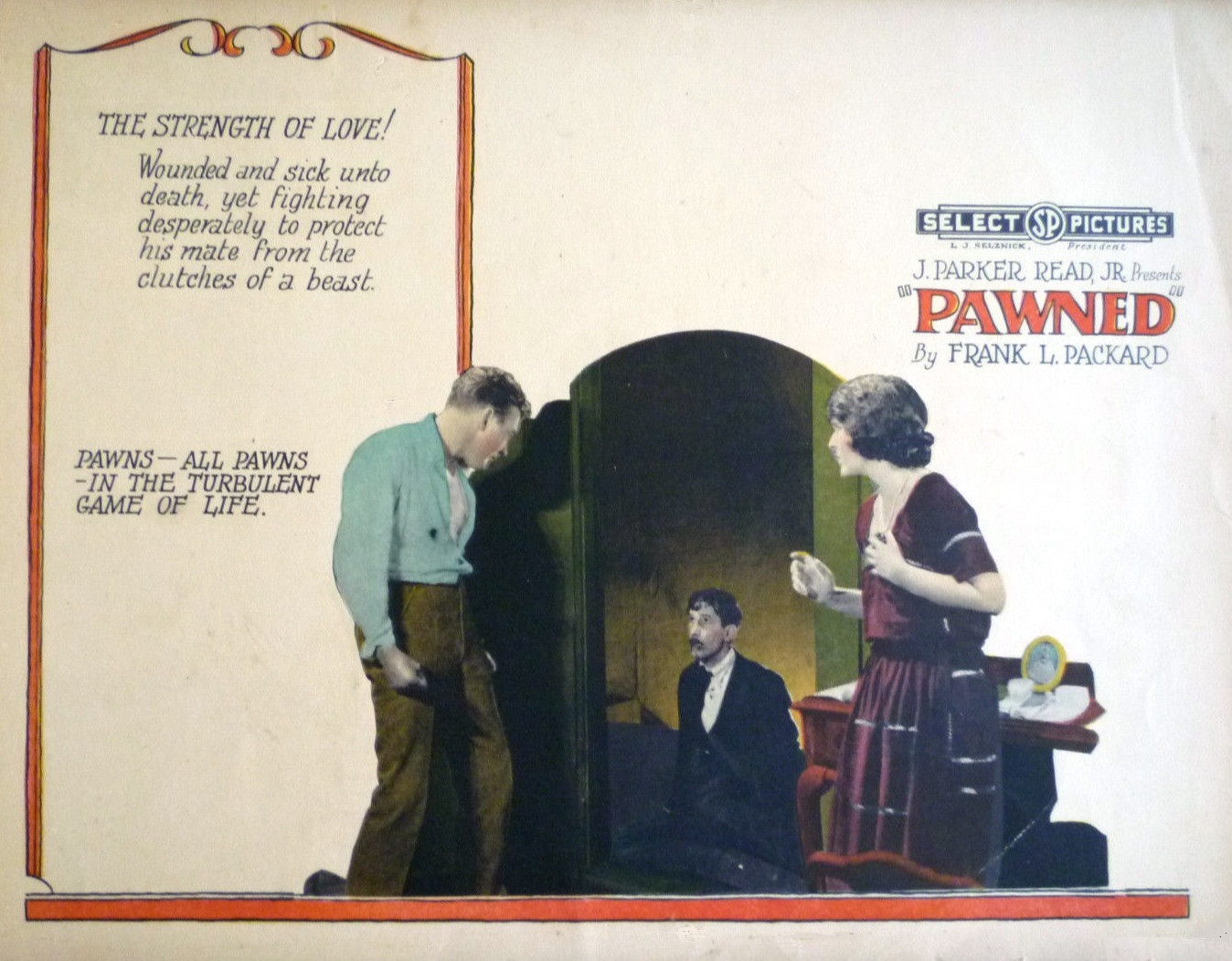
- Lobby card.
- Directed by: Irvin Willat
- Written by: Frank L. Packard (novel)
- Based on: Pawned by Frank L. Packard
- Produced by: J. Parker Read Jr.
- Starring: Tom Moore; Edith Roberts; Charles K. Gerrard; Josef Swickard; Mabel Van Buren; James O. Barrows
- Production company: Select Pictures Corporation
- Distributed by: Selznick Distributing Corporation
- Release date: November 13, 1922
- Running time: 5 reels
- Country: United States
- Language: Silent film (English intertitles)

Pawned is a 1922 American silent melodrama film directed by Irvin Willat, and starring Tom Moore, Edith Roberts, Charles K. Gerrard, Josef Swickard, Mabel Van Buren, and James O. Barrows. It is based on the 1921 novel of the same name by Frank L. Packard. The film was released by Selznick Distributing Corporation on November 13, 1922.

== Cast ==
- Tom Moore as John Bruce
- Edith Roberts as Claire Veniza
- Charles K. Gerrard as Dr. Crang
- Josef Swickard as Paul Veniza
- Mabel Van Buren as Mrs. Veniza
- James O. Barrows as Old Hawkins
- Eric Mayne as Gilbert Larmond
- William Elmer as Joe Burke

== Preservation ==
The film is now considered lost.

== Gallery ==
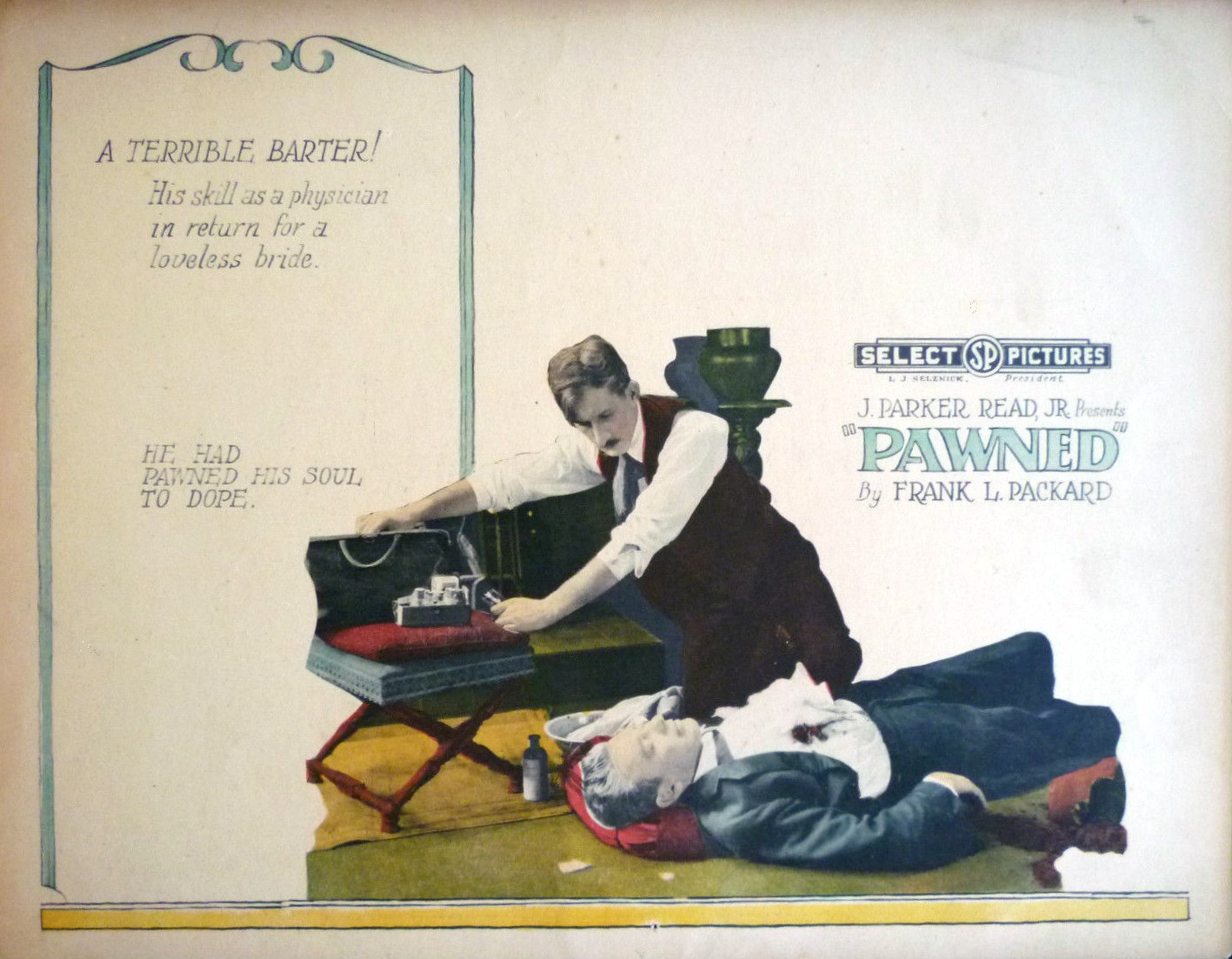
Lobby card (2/3)

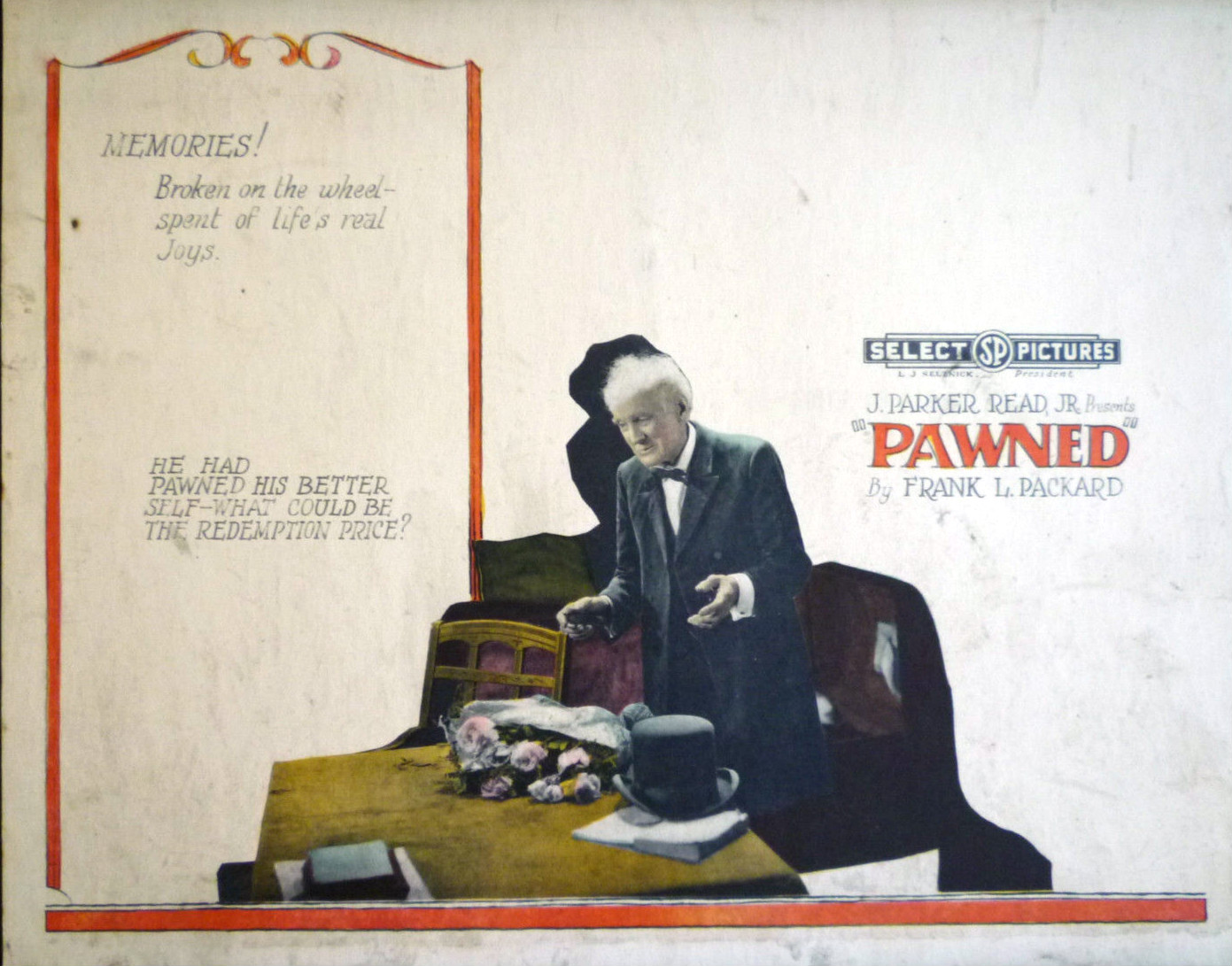
Lobby card (3/3)
