= Kid Gloves (film) =

1929 film

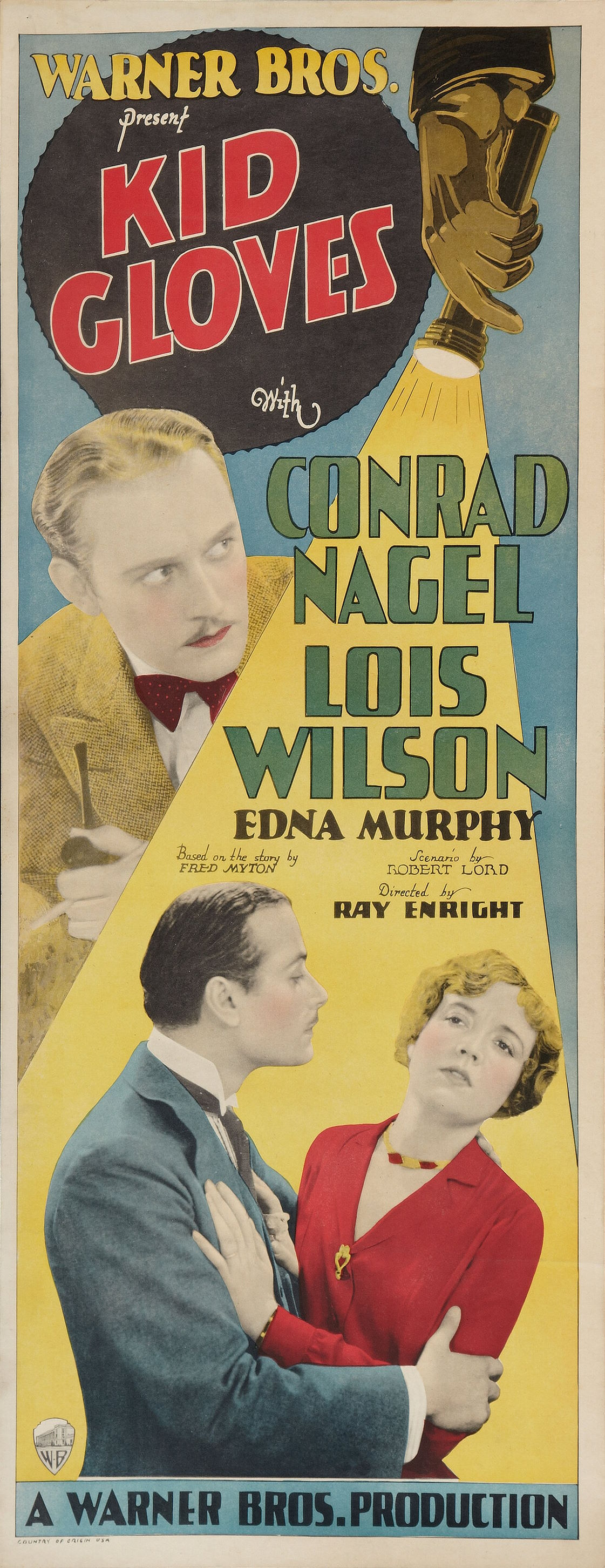
- Theatrical release poster
- Directed by: Ray Enright
- Written by: Robert Lord (titles); Fred Myton (story)
- Screenplay by: Robert Lord
- Starring: Conrad Nagel; Lois Wilson; Edward Earle; Edna Murphy; Maude Turner Gordon
- Cinematography: Ben F. Reynolds
- Edited by: George Marks
- Production company: Warner Bros. Pictures
- Distributed by: Warner Bros. Pictures
- Release date: March 23, 1929
- Running time: 7 reels
- Country: United States
- Languages: Sound (Part-Talkie); English Intertitles

Kid Gloves is a 1929 American sound part-talkie pre-Code drama film directed by Ray Enright, and starring Conrad Nagel, Lois Wilson, Edward Earle, Edna Murphy, and Maude Turner Gordon. In addition to sequences with audible dialogue or talking sequences, the film features a synchronized musical score and sound effects along with English intertitles. According to the film review in Harrison's Reports, 75 percent of the total running time featured dialogue. The soundtrack was recorded using the Vitaphone sound-on-disc system. The film was released by Warner Bros. Pictures on March 23, 1929.

== Plot ==
"Kid Gloves" Smith, a hijacker, is caught in a gun battle on a residential street with Nick the bootlegger and two of his henchmen—members of a gang secretly financed by John Stone, a political power in the city and fiancé of the beautiful Ruth Darrow.

Duffy, a taxi driver, drives into the firefight and stops his cab. One of his passengers, Penny, leaps out and runs, leaving Ruth—his secret lover—unconscious in the back seat. Duffy carries her into the apartment of his friend Lou, a shoplifter. As they try to revive her, Kid Gloves enters through the window and joins the effort.

Stone has had Ruth followed by Butch, a thug, who reports that she has been taken into Lou's apartment. Stone arrives, finds Ruth and Kid Gloves together, and, suspecting an affair, forces them to marry on the spot under threat of scandal.

Penny later returns to claim Ruth, but when Kid Gloves offers to divorce her so she can marry Penny, Penny backs out, citing lack of funds. The Kid and Ruth begin a platonic domestic life, with the Kid treating her like a sister. Meanwhile, Stone confesses to Ruth's Aunt Margaret that he still wants to marry Ruth, though she now despises him.

In love with Ruth, Kid Gloves tries to go straight, unaware that she is falling for him too. Stone, unable to win Ruth back, plots to eliminate Kid Gloves. He sends Pony Joe to recruit him for a hijacking job involving liquor stored in a building Stone owns.

Penny, having inherited a fortune, reenters Ruth's life determined to marry her. Heartbroken, the Kid agrees to join Joe in the job. Duffy and Lou overhear Joe and Nick discussing the setup and rush to warn the Kid, but he has already left. Suspecting a trap, the Kid stays alert. When the gangsters open fire, Joe is shot, and the Kid escapes.

Stone and Butch, the latter posing as a cop, go to arrest the Kid and “take him for a ride.” Ruth agrees to marry Stone to save the Kid, unaware that Stone plans to have him killed. As they're leading the Kid away in handcuffs, Duffy arrives with a gun, pretends to be a Federal agent, and rescues him.

Outside, Duffy accepts a $5,000 bribe from Stone, releases Stone and Butch, and returns to the apartment to reveal to Ruth and the Kid that he isn't an officer at all. After Joe's death, a statement implicating Stone surfaces, and Stone flees the city.

The Kid and Ruth choose to stay together as plain Mr. and Mrs. Smith.

== Cast ==
- Conrad Nagel as Kid Gloves
- Lois Wilson as Ruth
- Edward Earle as Penny
- Edna Murphy as Lou
- Maude Turner Gordon as Aunt
- Richard Cramer as Butch
- Tom Dugan as Duffy
- John Davidson as Stone

== Preservation ==
A print of the film survives at the George Eastman House.

== See also ==
- List of early sound feature films (1926–1929)
