= The Kingdom Within =

1922 film by Victor Schertzinger

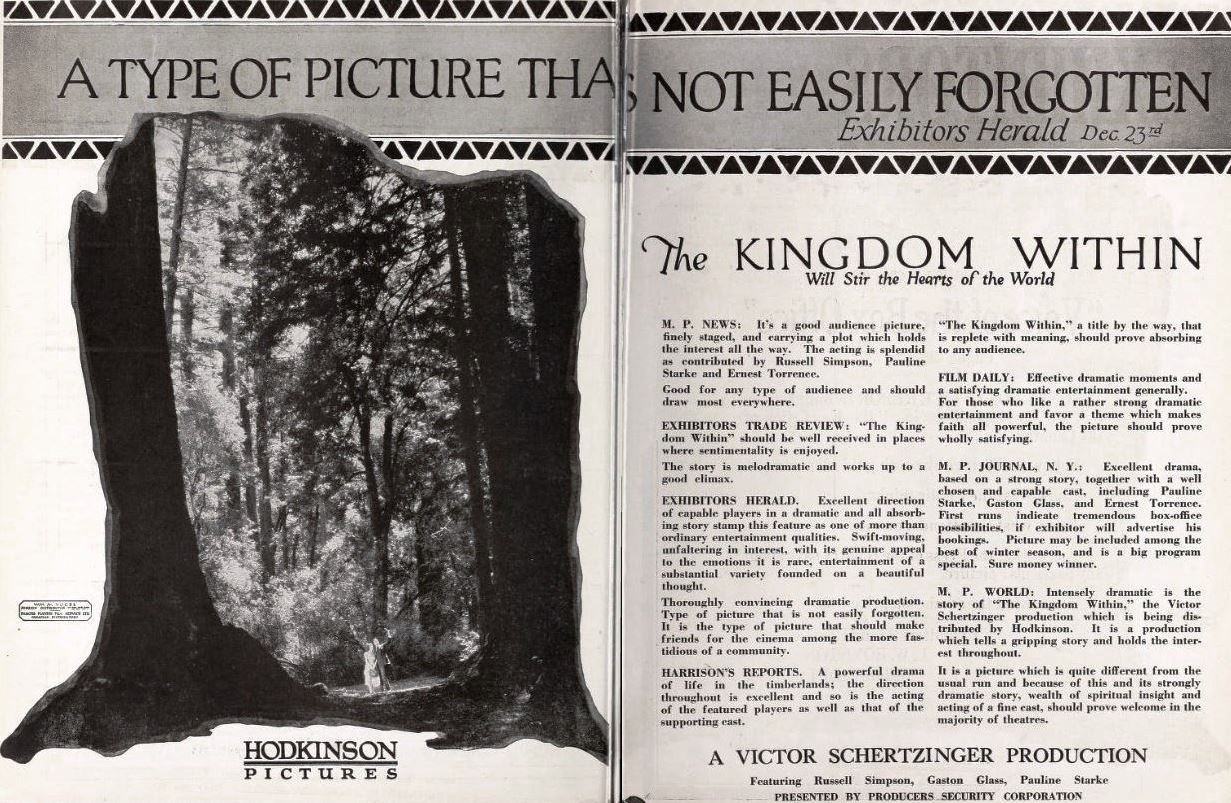
- Trade advertisement
- Directed by: Victor Schertzinger
- Written by: Kenneth B. Clarke
- Starring: Russell Simpson; Z. Wall Covington; Gaston Glass
- Cinematography: John Stumar
- Production company: Producers Security Corporation
- Distributed by: W. W. Hodkinson Corporation
- Release date: December 24, 1922
- Running time: 7 reels
- Country: United States
- Language: Silent (English intertitles)

The Kingdom Within is a 1922 American silent drama film directed by Victor Schertzinger and starring Russell Simpson, Z. Wall Covington, and Gaston Glass.

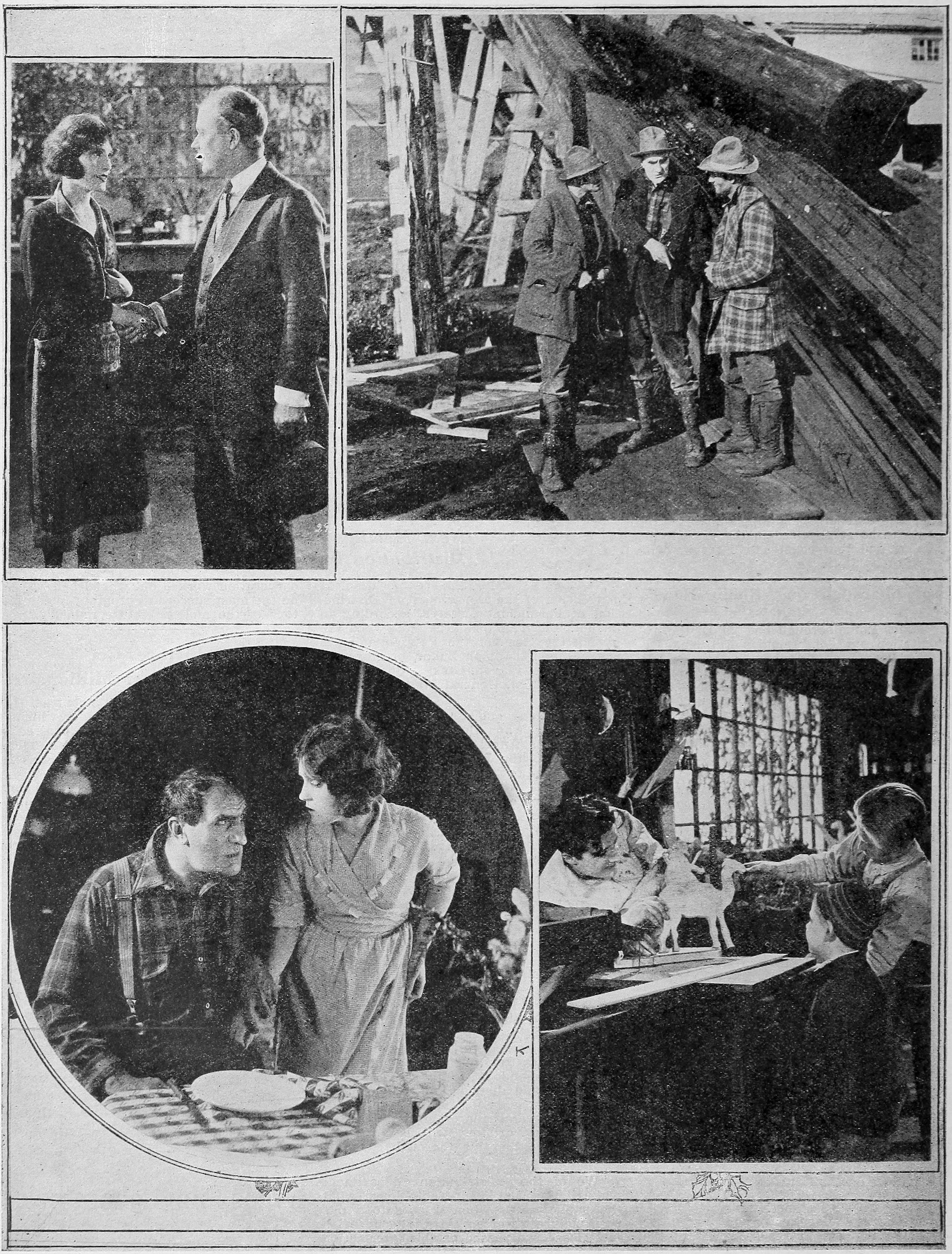
Publicity photos for the film

== Plot ==
As described in a film magazine, Caleb Deming (Simpson) always wanted a boy but his son was born paralyzed in his right arm. As a result, Caleb hated the boy, but Amos (Glass) grew up with a keen spiritual insight which he exerted over Emily Preston (Starke), a young woman who lived next door and who was taunted by the villagers because her brother had been in prison. Together Amos and Emily made little wooden toys for the children and soon established a wide reputation. Will Preston (Cooley) returns after serving his sentence, having learned his lesson and telling all of his intentions to go straight. Krieg (Torrence), nursing a grudge against Dodd (Russell), owner of the lumber camp, plans to use Will as a tool to obtain revenge. He murders Dodd and the guilt falls on Will. Emily discovers who the real murderer is and Krieg, who has been in hiding, returns a few nights later to kill the young woman who told on him. Will sees him going into the house and a fight takes place, but Krieg shoots Will. Amos, the cripple, hears the shot and rushes to Emily's rescue. He is beaten by Krieg and thrown on the floor, but when he arises he discovers his arm is perfect. Krieg, astounded and frightened by the miracle, rushes from the house but is caught outside. Caleb begs his son's forgiveness and Amos claims Emily as his bride.

== Cast ==
- Russell Simpson as Caleb Deming
- Z. Wall Covington as Danny West
- Gaston Glass as Amos
- Pauline Starke as Emily Preston
- Hallam Cooley as Will Preston
- Ernest Torrence as Krieg
- J. Gordon Russell as Dodd
- Marion Feducha as Connie

== Preservation ==
Tinted 35 mm prints of reels 1 and 4 survive at Chicago Film Archives.

== Bibliography ==
- James Robert Parish & Michael R. Pitts. Film directors: a guide to their American films. Scarecrow Press, 1974.
