= The Truth About Men (film) =

1926 film

- Directed by: Elmer Clifton
- Written by: Lewis Allen Browne
- Produced by: Bernarr Macfadden
- Starring: Edna Murphy; George Hackathorne; Alice Lake
- Production company: MacFadden True Story Pictures
- Distributed by: Astor Pictures
- Release date: April 30, 1926
- Running time: 70 minutes
- Country: United States
- Language: Silent (English intertitles)

The Truth About Men is a 1926 American silent drama film directed by Elmer Clifton and starring Edna Murphy, George Hackathorne and Alice Lake.

== Cast ==
- Edna Murphy as Elsa
- George Hackathorne as James
- Alice Lake as Dora

== Bibliography ==
- Connelly, Robert B. The Silents: Silent Feature Films, 1910-36, Volume 40, Issue 2. December Press, 1998.
- Munden, Kenneth White. The American Film Institute Catalog of Motion Pictures Produced in the United States, Part 1. University of California Press, 1997.
