= The Wrongdoers =

1925 silent film

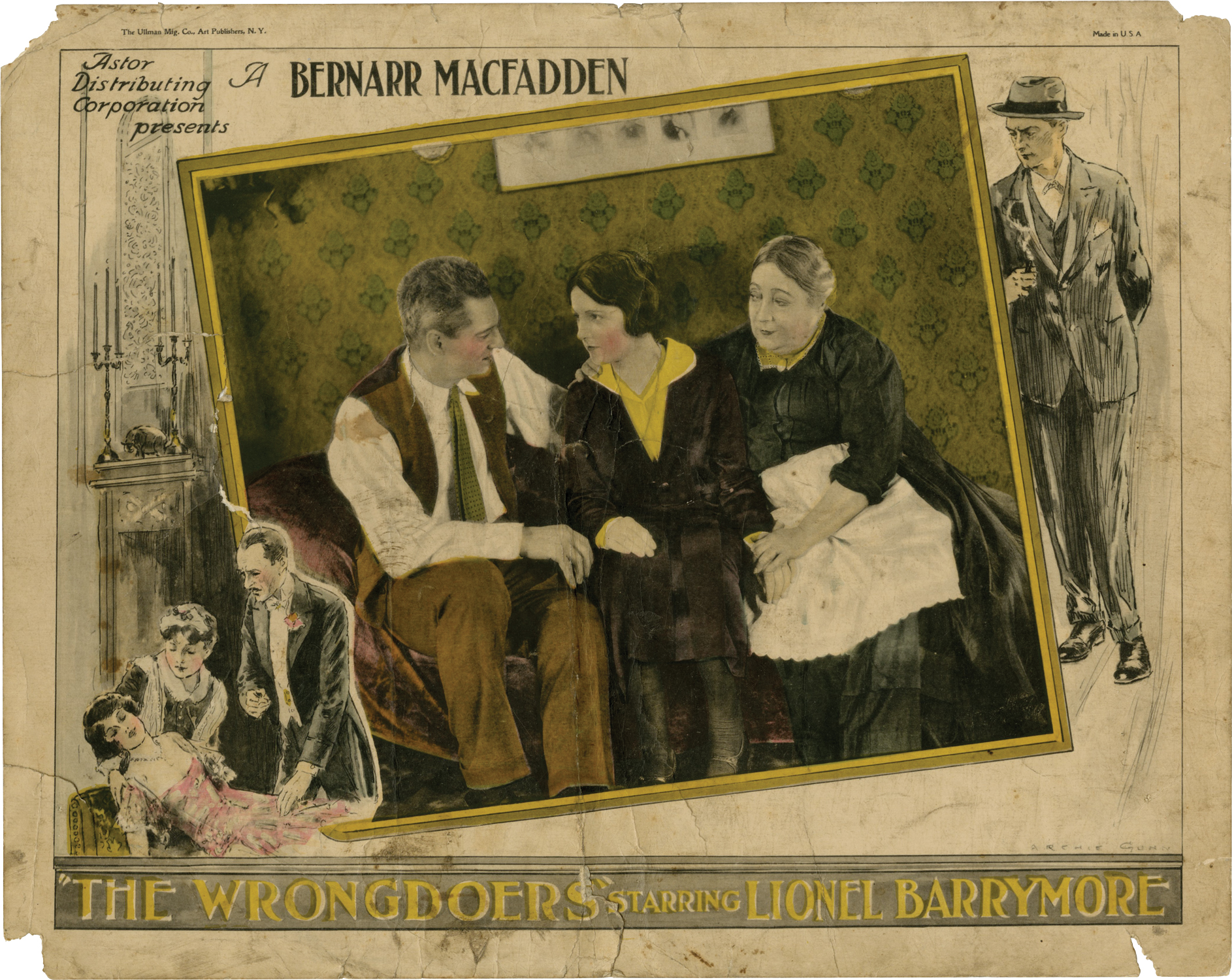
- Lobby card
- Directed by: Hugh Dierker
- Written by: Lewis Allen Browne
- Produced by: Bernarr Macfadden
- Starring: Lionel Barrymore; Anne Cornwall; Henry Hull
- Cinematography: Fred Chaston; John K. Holbrook
- Production company: MacFadden True Story Pictures
- Distributed by: Astor Pictures; Ideal Films (UK)
- Release date: September 3, 1925
- Running time: 50 minutes
- Country: United States
- Language: Silent (English intertitles)

The Wrongdoers is a 1925 American silent drama film directed by Hugh Dierker and starring Lionel Barrymore, Anne Cornwall, and Henry Hull.

== Plot ==
As described in a film magazine review, a druggist who is philanthropic but poor, heads a robber gang that steals from the rich to aid the poor. His son, who is in love with the daughter of the woman his father befriended, foils a robbery planned by his father. The father and the man who was to have been robbed are killed. The son and the young woman are married.

== Cast ==
- Lionel Barrymore as Daniel Abbott
- Anne Cornwall as Helen Warren
- Henry Hull as Jimmy Nolan
- Henry Sedley as Sylvester Doane
- Blanche Craig as Honora
- Flora Finch as Society Woman
- William Calhoun as Butler
- Harry Lee as Solemn Man
- Tammany Young as Crook
- Tom Brown as Little Jimmy

== Preservation ==
A complete print of The Wrongdoers exists at the UCLA Film & Television Archive in Los Angeles.

== Bibliography ==
- Munden, Kenneth White (1997). The American Film Institute Catalog of Motion Pictures Produced in the United States, Part 1. University of California Press. ISBN 978-0-520-20969-5.
