= George Hackathorne =

American actor (1896–1940)

- Stars of the Photoplay, 1924
- Born: February 13, 1896; Pendleton, Oregon, US
- Died: June 25, 1940 (aged 44); Los Angeles, California, US
- Years active: 1916–1938

George Hackathorne (February 13, 1896 – June 25, 1940) was an American actor of the silent era. He appeared in more than 50 films between 1916 and 1939.

Hackathorne was born and educated in Pendleton, Oregon. Despite his mother's wishes that he get a college education, he chose to be an actor. He began his career as a child actor in stock theater, after which he performed in vaudeville. He and his brother had a dramatic act that toured the United States.

On June 25, 1940, Hackathorne died in Hollywood, California, at age 44. He was buried in Hollywood Forever Cemetery.

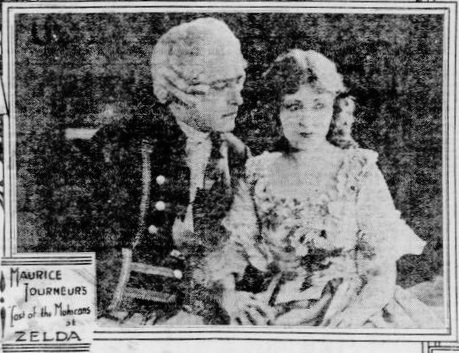
Hackathorne and Lillian Hall in Minnesota newspaper promotion for The Last of the Mohicans (1920)

== Partial filmography ==
- Oliver Twist (1916)
- Tom Sawyer (1917) – Sid Sawyer
- Huck and Tom (1918) – Sid Sawyer
- Amarilly of Clothes-Line Alley (1918) – Amarilly's Brother (uncredited)
- A Law Unto Herself (1918) – Bertrand Von Klassner at age 20
- The Heart of Humanity (1918) – Louis Patricia
- Sue of the South (1919) – Shad Peters
- Josselyn's Wife (1919) – Joe Latimer
- The Shepherd of the Hills (1919) – Ollie Stuart
- Better Times (1919) – Tony
- The Splendid Sin (1919) – The Honorable George Granville
- The Speed Maniac (1919) – Tom Matthews
- Too Much Johnson (1919) – Henry McIntosh
- The Last of the Mohicans (1920) – Captain Randolph
- To Please One Woman (1920) – Freddy
- The Sin of Martha Queed (1921) – Atlas
- High Heels (1921) – Laurie Trevor
- What Do Men Want? (1921) – Arthur
- The Light in the Clearing (1921) – Amos Grimshaw
- The Little Minister (1921) – Gavin
- The Gray Dawn (1922) – Calhoun Bennett
- The Worldly Madonna (1922) – Ramez
- Human Hearts (1922) – Jimmy Logan
- Notoriety (1922) – Batty
- The Village Blacksmith (1922) – Johnnie Hammond
- Human Wreckage (1923) – Jimmy Brown
- Merry-Go-Round (1923) – Bartholomew Gruber
- Judgment of the Storm (1924) – Bob Heath
- When a Man's a Man (1924) – Yapavai Joe
- Surging Seas (1924) – Charles Stafford
- The Turmoil (1924) – Bibbs Sheridan
- Capital Punishment (1924) – Dan OConnor
- The Lady (1925) – Leonard Cairns
- Night Life of New York (1925) – Jimmy
- Wandering Fires (1925) – Raymond Corroll
- His Master's Voice (1925) – Bob Henley
- The Highbinders (1926) – Humpty Dugan
- Things Wives Tell (1926) – Charles
- The Truth About Men (1926) – James
- The Sea Urchin (1926) – Jack Trebarrow
- Cheaters (1927) – Paul Potter
- Paying the Price (1927) – Basil Payson
- Sally's Shoulders (1928) – Beau
- The Tip Off (1929) – 'Shrimp' Riley
- The Squall (1929) – Niki
- Captain of the Guard (1930) – Robespierre
- Hide-Out (1930) – Atlas
- The Lonesome Trail (1930) – Oswald
- Beyond the Law (1930) – Monty
- Riders of the North (1931) – Henchman Canuck Joe
- Self Defense (1932) – Paul
- Flaming Guns (1932) – Hugh – Ramsey's Secretary
- Only Yesterday (1933) – (uncredited)
- The Countess of Monte Cristo (1934) – Headwaiter (uncredited)
- Strange Wives (1934) – Guggin's Secretary
- Magnificent Obsession (1935) – Ex-Patient (uncredited)
- I Cover Chinatown (1936) – Head Waiter
- The Man I Married (1936) – Critic (uncredited)
- Smashing the Rackets (1938) – Detective (uncredited)
- Gone with the Wind (1939) – wounded soldier in pain (uncredited)
