= The Inferior Sex =

1920 film by Joseph Henabery

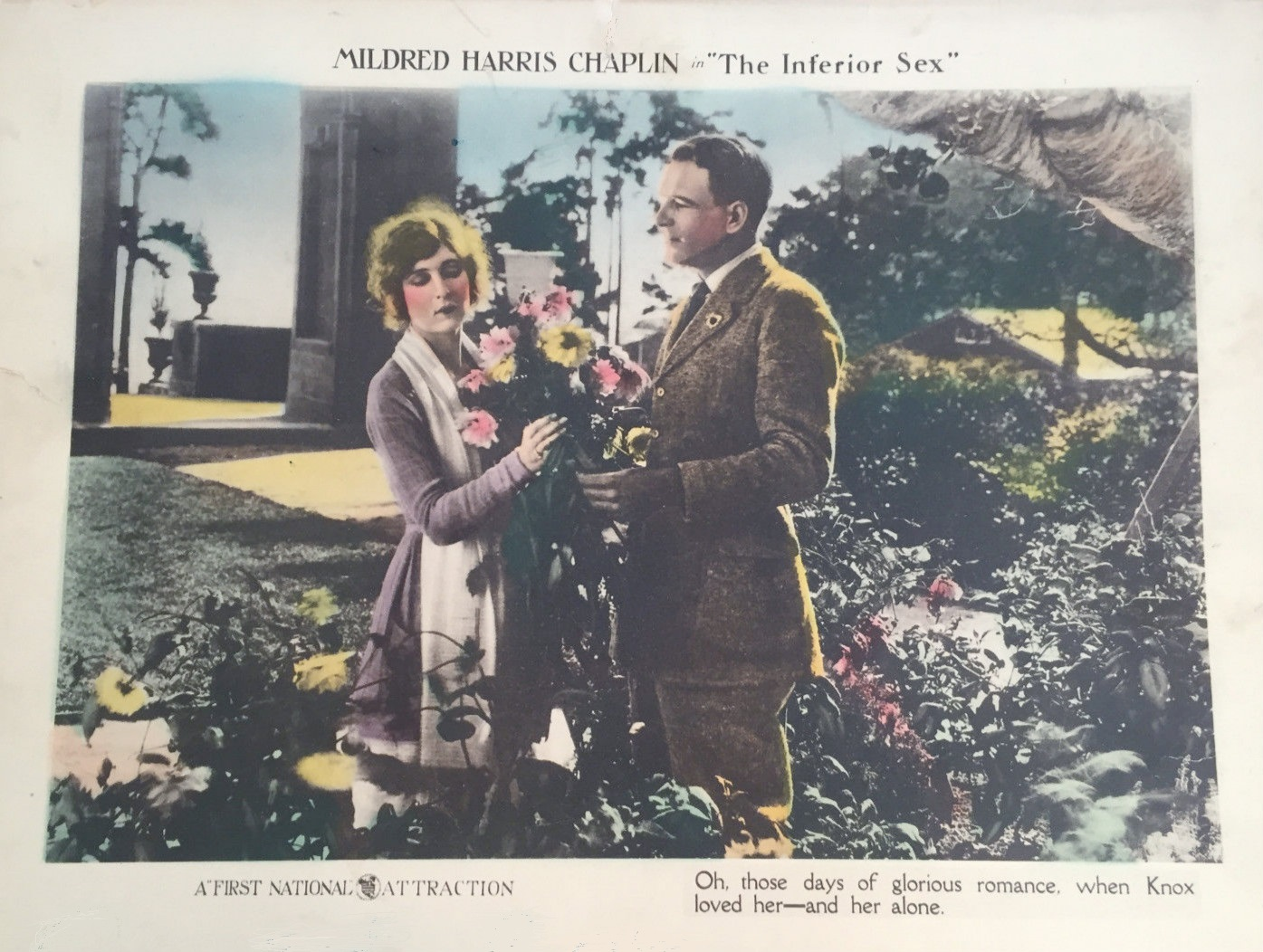
- Lobby card
- Directed by: Joseph Henabery
- Screenplay by: Keene Thompson; Waldemar Young
- Based on: The Inferior Sex by Frank Slayton
- Produced by: Louis B. Mayer
- Starring: Mildred Harris; Milton Sills; Mary Alden; John Steppling; Bertram Grassby; James O. Barrows
- Cinematography: Tony Gaudio
- Production company: Chaplin-Mayer Pictures Company
- Distributed by: First National Exhibitors' Circuit
- Release date: March 8, 1920
- Running time: 50 minutes
- Country: United States
- Language: English

The Inferior Sex is a 1920 American drama film directed by Joseph Henabery and written by Keene Thompson and Waldemar Young. It is based on the 1910 play The Inferior Sex by Frank Slayton. The film stars Mildred Harris, Milton Sills, Mary Alden, John Steppling, Bertram Grassby and James O. Barrows. The film was released on March 8, 1920, by First National Exhibitors' Circuit.

== Cast ==
- Mildred Harris as Allisa Randall
- Milton Sills as Knox Randall
- Mary Alden as Clarissa Mott-Smith
- John Steppling as George Mott / Smith
- Bertram Grassby as Porter Maddox
- James O. Barrows as Captain Andy Drake

== Preservation ==
The film is now lost.
