= False Pride =

1925 silent film

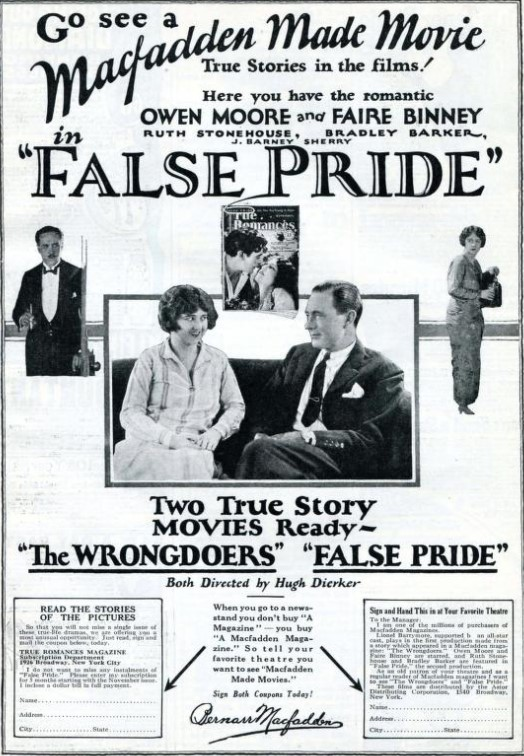
- Advertisement
- Directed by: Hugh Dierker
- Written by: Lewis Allen Browne
- Produced by: Bernarr Macfadden
- Starring: Owen Moore; Faire Binney; Ruth Stonehouse; J. Barney Sherry
- Production company: MacFadden True Story Pictures
- Distributed by: Astor Pictures
- Release date: November 1925
- Running time: 50 minutes
- Country: United States
- Language: Silent (English intertitles)

False Pride is a 1925 American silent drama film directed by Hugh Dierker and starring Owen Moore, Faire Binney, Ruth Stonehouse, and J. Barney Sherry.

== Plot ==
As described in a film magazine review, a young man who prefers legal practice to a life of ease is engaged by a wealthy woman to investigate the past of her niece, whom she wishes to adopt. He falls in love with the girl as soon as he sees her, though he has no sympathy for many of her ideas and for her manner of living. After a series of incidents that almost result in his going to prison, the young attorney overcomes the young woman’s false notions about success. Then a wedding is arranged.

== Cast ==
- Owen Moore as James Mason Ardsley
- Faire Binney as Mary Sargent
- Ruth Stonehouse
- J. Barney Sherry
- Bradley Barker
- Pauline Armitage
- Jane Jennings

== Preservation ==
With no prints of False Pride located in any film archives, it is a lost film.

== Bibliography ==
- Robert B. Connelly. The Silents: Silent Feature Films, 1910-36, Volume 40, Issue 2. December Press, 1998.
