= His Foreign Wife =

1927 film

- Directed by: John P. McCarthy
- Written by: Albert DeMond; John P. McCarthy
- Starring: Greta von Rue; Edna Murphy; Wallace MacDonald
- Production company: William Wallace Cook Productions
- Distributed by: Pathé Exchange
- Release date: November 27, 1927
- Running time: 50 minutes
- Country: United States
- Languages: Silent; English intertitles

His Foreign Wife is a 1927 American silent drama film directed by John P. McCarthy and starring Greta von Rue, Edna Murphy and Wallace MacDonald.

== Synopsis ==
Along with his brother, a young man enlists to fight in World War I. Although his brother is killed, he returns home a hero. However the people of his town are shocked that he has married a German woman and refuse to accept her.

== Cast ==
- Greta von Rue as Hilda Schultzenbach
- Edna Murphy as Mary Jackson
- Wallace MacDonald as Johnny Haines
- Charles Clary as The Mayor
- Elsie Bishop as Frau Schultzenbach
- Lee Shumway

== Bibliography ==
- Munden, Kenneth White. The American Film Institute Catalog of Motion Pictures Produced in the United States, Part 1. University of California Press, 1997.
