= The Old Fool =

1923 film

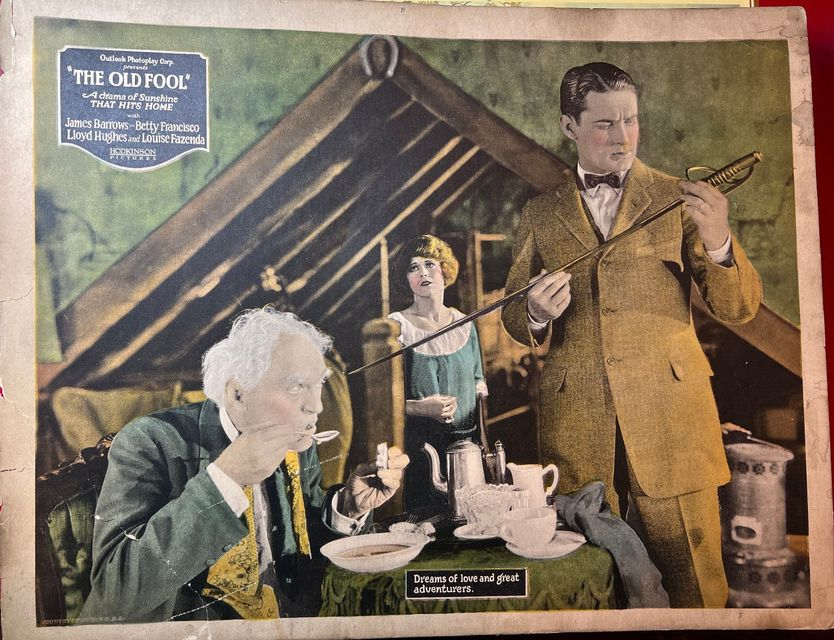
- Directed by: Edward D. Venturini
- Written by: J. C. Fabrini
- Starring: James O. Barrows; Lloyd Hughes; Jim Mason
- Cinematography: Ned Van Buren
- Production company: Outlook Photoplays
- Distributed by: W.W. Hodkinson Distribution
- Release date: December 31, 1923
- Running time: 60 minutes
- Country: United States
- Languages: Silent; English intertitles

The Old Fool is a 1923 American silent Western film directed by Edward D. Venturini and starring James O. Barrows, Lloyd Hughes and Jim Mason.

== Plot ==
Grandad Steele, an American Civil War veteran, moves to Texas in his retirement to live with his grandson John. The local sheriff, who is smuggling firearms across the Mexico–United States border, kidnaps John's girlfriend Mary. The Steeles chase him down and Grandad kills him with his Civil War saber.

== Cast ==
- James O. Barrows as Grandad Steele
- Henry Hunt as Peter Steele
- Jim Mason as Henry Steele
- Lloyd Hughes as John Steele
- Barbara Tennant as Dora Steele
- Betty Francisco sa Mary Manners
- Ben Hendricks Jr. as Pete Harkins
- Louise Fazenda as Dolores Murphy
- O. V. Harrison as Larry Bellows
- Monte Collins as Pop Hardy
- Tom Mean as Rogers
