= Edna Murphy =

American actress (1899–1974)

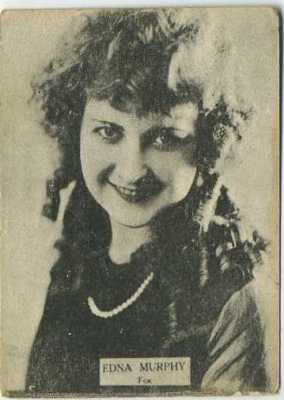
- Murphy, c. 1920
- Born: November 17, 1899; New York City, U.S.
- Died: August 3, 1974 (aged 74); Santa Monica, California, U.S.
- Occupation: Actress
- Years active: 1918–1933
- Spouse: Mervyn LeRoy (1927–1932, divorced)

Edna Murphy (November 17, 1899 – August 3, 1974) was an American actress of the silent era. She appeared in 80 films between 1918 and 1933. Murphy was voted "Most Photographed Movie Star of 1925" by ScreenLand Magazine.

For part of her career, Murphy was the leading woman in films with Monte Blue.

Murphy married director Mervyn LeRoy on December 18, 1927. She divorced him on June 30, 1932, on the grounds of desertion.

== Filmography ==
- To the Highest Bidder (1918)
- Fantômas (1920)
- Over the Hill to the Poorhouse (1920)
- The Branded Woman (1920)
- The North Wind's Malice (1920)
- Dynamite Allen (1921)
- Play Square (1921)
- What Love Will Do (1921)
- The Jolt (1921)
- Live Wires (1921)
- Extra! Extra! (1922)
- The Galloping Kid (1922)
- Don't Shoot (1922)
- Caught Bluffing (1922)
- The Ordeal (1922)
- Ridin' Wild (1922)
- Paid Back (1922)
- The Man Between (1923)
- Her Dangerous Path (1923)
- Nobody's Bride (1923)
- Going Up (1923)
- Leatherstocking (1924)
- The King of Wild Horses (1924)
- The White Moth (1924)
- Daughters of Today (1924)
- Into the Net (1924)
- After the Ball (1924)
- Lena Rivers (1925)
- Wildfire (1925)
- The Police Patrol (1925)
- Lying Wives (1925)
- Ermine and Rhinestones (1925)
- His Buddy's Wife (1925)
- A Man Must Live (1925)
- Clothes Make the Pirate (1925)
- Obey The Law (1926)
- Wives at Auction (1926)
- Things Wives Tell (1926)
- The Truth About Men (1926)
- College Days (1926)
- 45 Minutes from Hollywood (1926)
- Oh, What a Night! (1926)
- The Little Giant (1926)
- McFadden's Flats (1927)
- The Valley of Hell (1927)
- Tarzan and the Golden Lion (1927)
- The Black Diamond Express (1927)
- Silver Comes Through (1927)
- His Foreign Wife (1927)
- Burnt Fingers (1927)
- Rose of the Bowery (1927)
- Wilful Youth (1927)
- All Aboard (1927)
- The Silent Hero (1927)
- Dearie (1927)
- The Cruise of the Hellion (1927)
- Modern Daughters (1927)
- Across the Atlantic (1928)
- The Sunset Legion (1928)
- The Midnight Adventure (1928)
- My Man (1928)
- The Greyhound Limited (1929)
- The Bachelor's Club (1929)
- The Sap (1929)
- Kid Gloves (1929)
- Stolen Kisses (1929)
- Little Johnny Jones (1929)
- The Show of Shows (1929)
- Lummox (1930)
- Dancing Sweeties (1930)
- Second Choice (1930)
- Wide Open (1930)
- Forgotten Women (1931)
- Finger Prints (1931)
- Anybody's Blonde (1931)
- Behind Office Doors (1931)
- Girl of the Rio (1932)
- Cheating Blondes (1933)
