= Gaston Glass =

American actor (1899–1965)

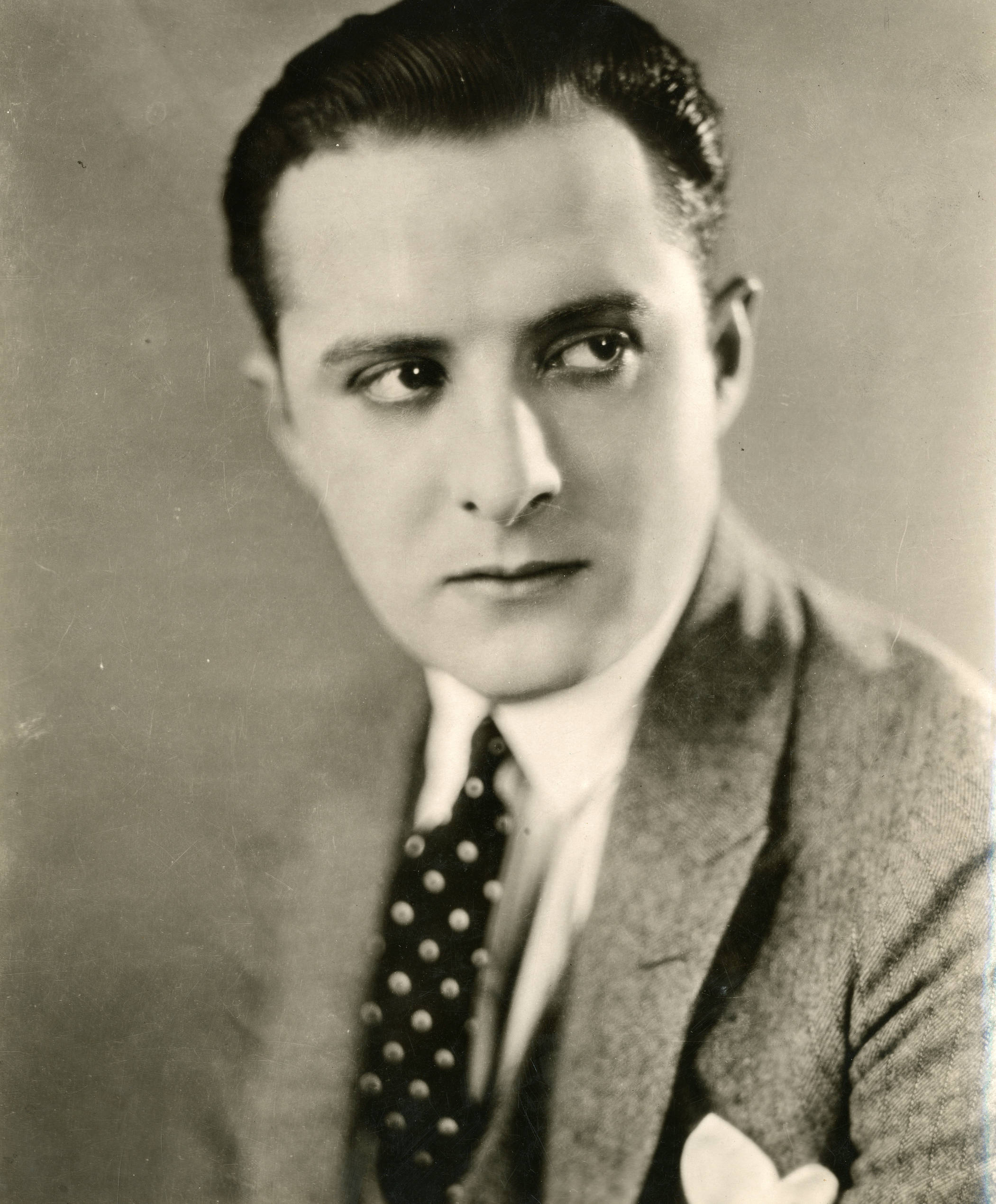
- Glass in 1923
- Born: Jacques Gaston Oscar Glass; December 31, 1899; Paris, French Third Republic
- Died: November 11, 1965 (aged 65); Santa Monica, California, U.S.
- Occupations: Actor, producer
- Years active: 1917–1943
- Spouses: Renée Adorée (m. 1925; div. 1926): Bo-Peep Karlin
- Children: Paul Glass

Gaston Glass (born Jacques Gaston Oscar Glass; December 31, 1899 – November 11, 1965) was a French-American actor and film producer. He was the father of the composer Paul Glass (born 1934).

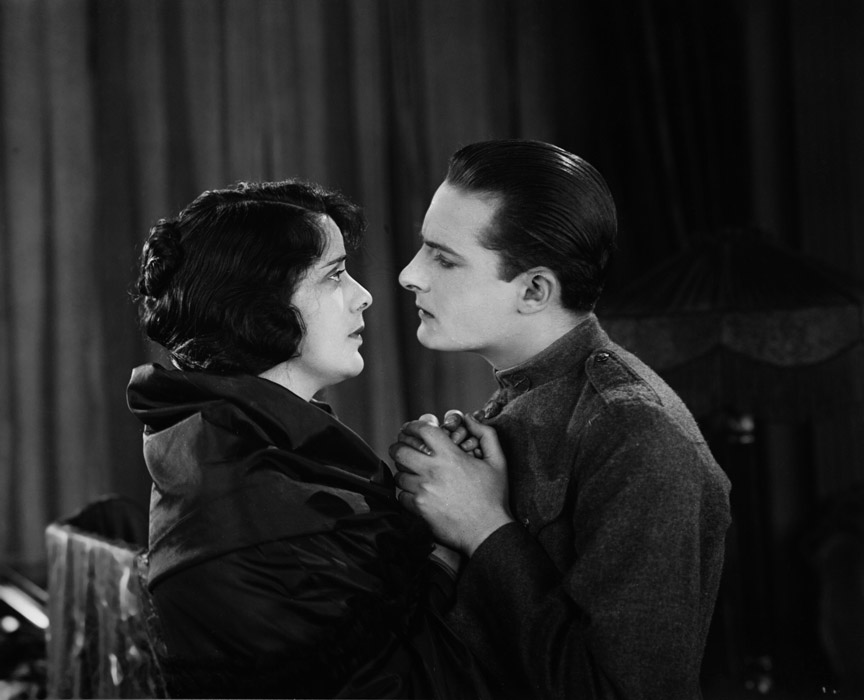
Alma Rubens and Glass in Humoresque (1920).

== Selected filmography ==
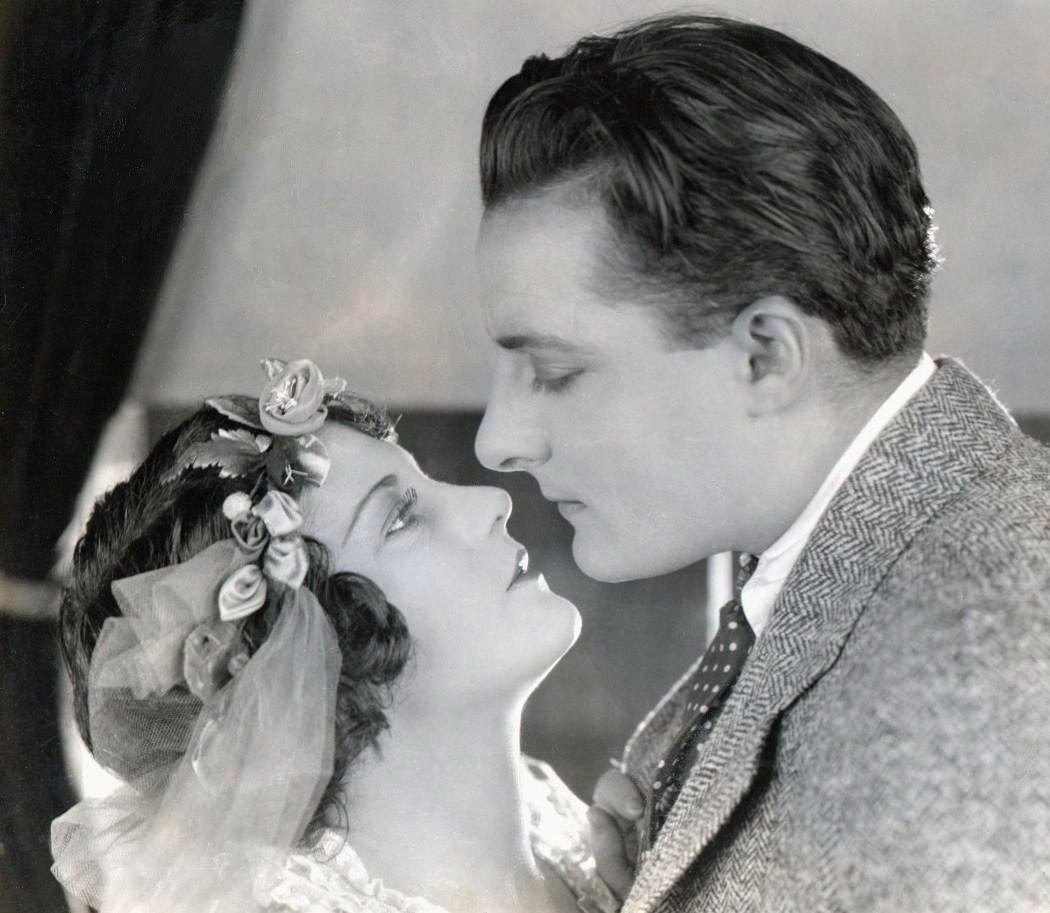
With Viola Dana in There Are No Villains (1921)

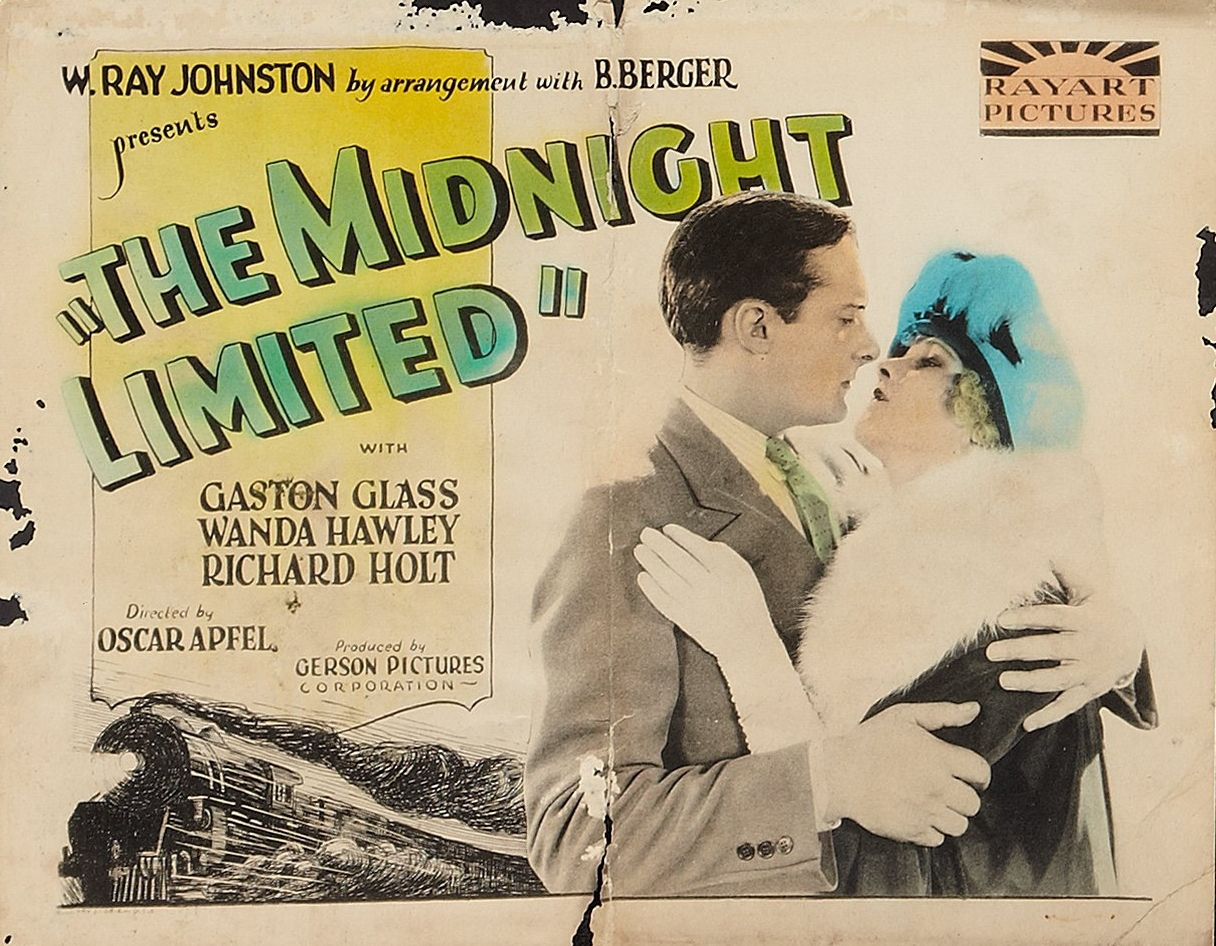
Glass with Wanda Hawley in The Midnight Limited (1926)

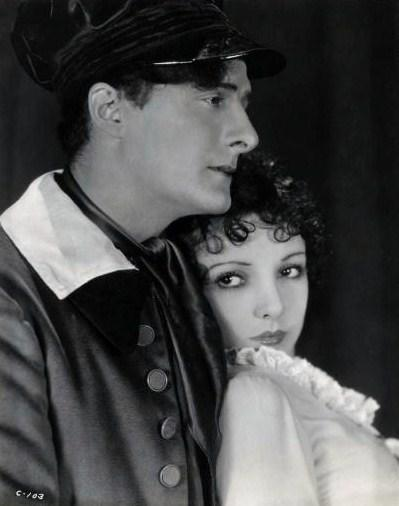
With Nina Quartero, in The Red Mark (1928 promotional photo)

- The Corsican Brothers (1917)
- Let's Elope (1919) - Darrell McKnight
- Oh, You Women! (1919) - Jimmy Johnson
- Open Your Eyes (1919)
- The Lost Battalion (1919) - Richard Merwin's Son
- The Woman of Lies (1919) - Tracy Norton
- Mothers of Men (1920) - Lt. Gerome De La Motte
- Humoresque (1920) - Leon Kantor (adult)
- The World and His Wife (1920) - Ernesto
- The Branded Woman (1920) - William Whitlock
- God's Crucible (1921) - Ivan Kalmar
- Her Winning Way (1921) - Harold Hargrave
- There Are No Villains (1921) - John King
- Cameron of the Royal Mounted (1921) - Cpl. Cameron
- The Song of Life (1922) - David Tilden
- Little Miss Smiles (1922) - Dr. Jack Washton
- Glass Houses (1922) - Billy Norton
- I Am the Law (1922) - Ralph Fitzgerald
- Rich Men's Wives (1922) - Juan Camillo
- Monte Cristo (1922) - Albert de Morcerf
- The Kingdom Within (1922) - Amos
- The Hero (1923) - Oswald Lane
- Gimme (1923) - Clinton Ferris
- The Spider and the Rose (1923) - Don Marcello
- The Girl Who Came Back (1923) - Ray Underhill
- Daughters of the Rich (1923) - Gerald Welden
- Mothers-in-Law (1923) - David Wingate
- The Midnight Flower (1923) - The Minister
- After the Ball (1924) - Arthur Trevelyan
- Trouping with Ellen (1924) - Andy Owens
- I Am the Man (1924) - Daniel Harrington
- Three Keys (1925) - George Lathrop
- The Mad Marriage (1925)
- Folly of Youth (1925) - Robert Cartwright
- Fair Play (1925) - Dickie Thane
- The Verdict (1925) - District Attorney
- Parisian Nights (1925) - Jacques
- The Danger Signal (1925) - Ralph Browning
- The Bad Lands (1925) - Hal Owen
- The Scarlet West (1925) - Capt. Howard
- The Price of Success (1925) - Wally
- Pursued (1925) - Dick Manning
- The Midnight Limited (1926) - Alan Bennett aka Alan Morse
- Broken Homes (1926) - John Merritt
- Things Wives Tell (1926) - Carl Burgess
- Wives at Auction (1926) - Mark Cameron
- Sweet Daddies (1926) - Sam Berkowitz
- The Call of the Klondike (1926) - Dick Norton
- The Romance of a Million Dollars (1926) - West MacDonald
- The Flying Fool (1926) - Jack Bryan
- Subway Sadie (1926) - Fred Perry
- Her Sacrifice (1926) - David Orland
- The Road to Broadway (1926) - John Worthington
- Tentacles of the North (1926) - Francis Wainfield
- The Jazz Girl (1926) - Rodneey Blake
- Exclusive Rights (1926) - Flash Fleming
- The Show Girl (1927) - Billy Barton
- The Love Wager (1927)
- Sinews of Steel (1927) - Robert McNeil Jr.
- False Morals (1927)
- Compassion (1927) - David Stanley
- Better Days (1927)
- The Gorilla (1927) - Marsden
- The Wife's Relations (1928) - Tom Powers
- My Home Town (1928) - David Warren
- Obey Your Husband (1928) - Arthur Reade
- Name the Woman (1928) - Joe Arnold
- A Gentleman Preferred (1928) - James Fargo
- The Red Mark (1928) - Bibi-Ri
- Broken Barriers (1928) - Charles Hill
- The Faker (1929) - Frank Clayton
- Geraldine (1929) - Bell Cameron
- Untamed Justice (1929) - Norman Bard, Air Mail Pilot
- Behind Closed Doors (1929) - Fred Baher
- Tiger Rose (1929) - Pierre
- A Woman's Justice (1930)
- Lopez, le bandit (1930) - Robert
- Just Like Heaven (1930) - Jean
- She Got What She Wanted (1930) - Boris
- The Big Trail (1931) - Pierre Calmine
- Lottery Lover (1935) - Andre (uncredited)
- Becky Sharp (1935) - British Officer (uncredited)
- The Man Who Broke the Bank at Monte Carlo (1935) - Minor Role (uncredited)
- Escape from Devil's Island (1935) - Sergeant (uncredited)
- Sylvia Scarlett (1935) - Purser (uncredited)
- Custer's Last Stand (1936, Serial) - Joe - Bartender (uncredited)
- Two in the Dark (1936) - Hotel Waiter (uncredited)
- Desire (1936) - Second Jewelry Clerk (uncredited)
- Sutter's Gold (1936) - Lt. Bacalenakoff (uncredited)
- Give Us This Night (1936) - Usher (uncredited)
- The Clutching Hand (1936) - Louis Bouchard
- Under Two Flags (1936) - Adjutant (uncredited)
- Fatal Lady (1936) - Brazilian Opera Troupe (uncredited)
- The Princess Comes Across (1936) - Photographer (uncredited)
- Hearts Divided (1936) - Napoleon's Secretary (uncredited)
- Mary of Scotland (1936) - Frenchman
- Gambling with Souls (1936) - Drunk Man in Bar
- Death in the Air (1936) - Lt. Rene La Rue
- Espionage (1937) - La Forge
- The King and the Chorus Girl (1937) - Junior Officer (uncredited)
- Paris After Dark (1943) - Soldier (uncredited)
