= Things Wives Tell =

1926 film

- Directed by: Hugh Dierker
- Produced by: Bernarr Macfadden
- Starring: Edna Murphy; Gaston Glass; George Hackathorne
- Production company: MacFadden True Story Pictures
- Distributed by: Astor Pictures
- Release date: March 23, 1926
- Country: United States
- Languages: Silent; English intertitles

Things Wives Tell is a 1926 American silent drama film directed by Hugh Dierker and starring Gaston Glass, Edna Murphy and George Hackathorne.

== Cast ==
- Gaston Glass as Carl Burgess
- Edna Murphy as Elaine Mackay
- Harlan Knight as Colonel Burgess
- George Hackathorne as Charles
- Walter Long as Ben Felton
- Lila Leslie
- Margaret Seddon

== Bibliography ==
- Munden, Kenneth White. The American Film Institute Catalog of Motion Pictures Produced in the United States, Part 1. University of California Press, 1997.
