= When Dawn Came =

1920 silent film

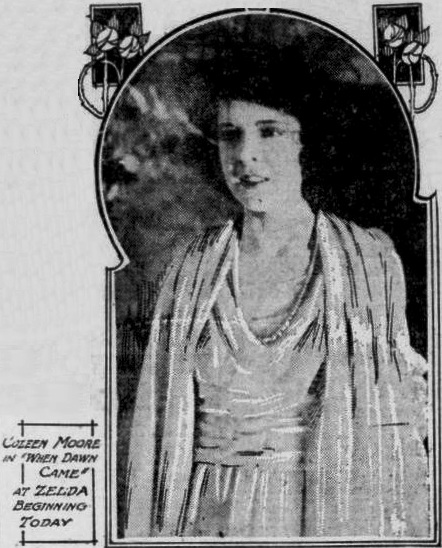
- Directed by: Colin Campbell
- Written by: Mrs. Hugh E. Dierker
- Produced by: Hugh Dierker
- Starring: Lee Shumway; James O. Barrows; Colleen Moore
- Cinematography: William C. Foster
- Production company: Hugh Dierker Productions
- Distributed by: Producers Security Corporation
- Release date: April 1920
- Running time: 70 minutes
- Country: United States
- Language: Silent (English intertitles)

When Dawn Came is a 1920 American silent drama film directed by Colin Campbell, starring Lee Shumway, James O. Barrows and Colleen Moore. A print of When Dawn Came exists in the Library of Congress film archive.

== Plot ==
A chance encounter with a writer who runs over his patient leads a poor benevolent doctor down a road of immorality and material wealth, before his faith in God brings him back again.

== Cast ==
- Lee Shumway as Dr. John Brandon
- James O. Barrows as Father Michael Farrel
- Colleen Moore as Mary Harrison
- Kathleen Kirkham as Norma Ashley
- William Conklin as Dr. Thurston
- Master Isadore Cohen as The 'Kid'
- Peaches Jackson as Crippled Child

== Bibliography ==
- Donald W. McCaffrey and Christopher P. Jacobs. Guide to the Silent Years of American Cinema. Greenwood Publishing, 1999. ISBN 0-313-30345-2
