= The Virgin Wife (1926 film) =

1926 silent film

- Directed by: Elmer Clifton
- Written by: Lewis Allen Browne
- Produced by: Bernarr Macfadden
- Starring: Pauline Garon; Niles Welch; Kenneth Harlan
- Cinematography: Alexander G. Penrod
- Production company: MacFadden True Story Pictures
- Distributed by: Astor Pictures
- Release date: May 12, 1926
- Running time: 50 minutes
- Country: United States
- Language: Silent (English intertitles)

The Virgin Wife is a 1926 American silent drama film directed by Elmer Clifton and starring Pauline Garon, Niles Welch and Kenneth Harlan.

== Cast ==
- Pauline Garon as Mary Jordan
- Niles Welch as Thomas Lattimer
- Kenneth Harlan as Dr. Everett Webb
- Jane Jennings as Virginia Jamieson
- Fritzi Brunette as Mrs. Henry Lattimer
- Joseph Allen Sr. as Henry Lattimer
- Charles Byer
- Orville Caldwell
- Ricca Allen
- Marie Schaefer
- William Walcott

== Bibliography ==
- Munden, Kenneth White. The American Film Institute Catalog of Motion Pictures Produced in the United States, Part 1. University of California Press, 1997.
