= The Wife's Relations =

1928 American silent comedy film

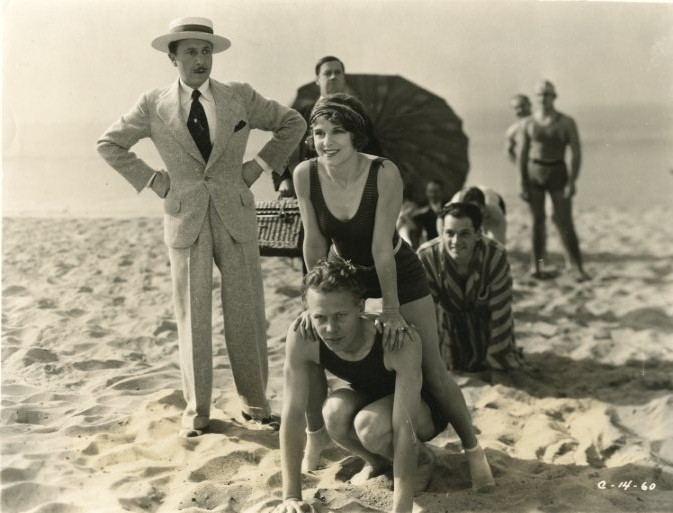
- Shirley Mason in a scene from the film.
- Directed by: Maurice Marshall
- Written by: Stephen Cooper; Adolph Unger
- Produced by: Harry Cohn
- Starring: Shirley Mason; Ben Turpin; Gaston Glass
- Cinematography: Ray June
- Edited by: Arthur Roberts
- Production company: Columbia Pictures
- Distributed by: Columbia Pictures
- Release date: January 13, 1928
- Running time: 58 minutes
- Country: United States
- Language: English

The Wife's Relations is a lost 1928 American silent comedy film directed by Maurice Marshall and starring Shirley Mason, Ben Turpin and Gaston Glass.

== Cast ==
- Shirley Mason as Patricia Dodd
- Ben Turpin as Rodney St. Clair
- Gaston Glass as Tom Powers
- Armand Kaliz as Clifford Rathburn
- Arthur Rankin as Bud
- Flora Finch as Mrs. Cyrus Dodd
- Lionel Belmore as Cyrus Dodd
- Maurice Ryan as Tubby
- James Harrison as Jimmy

== Bibliography ==
- George A. Katchmer. Eighty Silent Film Stars: Biographies and Filmographies of the Obscure to the Well Known. McFarland, 1991.
