= Broken Homes (film) =

1926 silent film

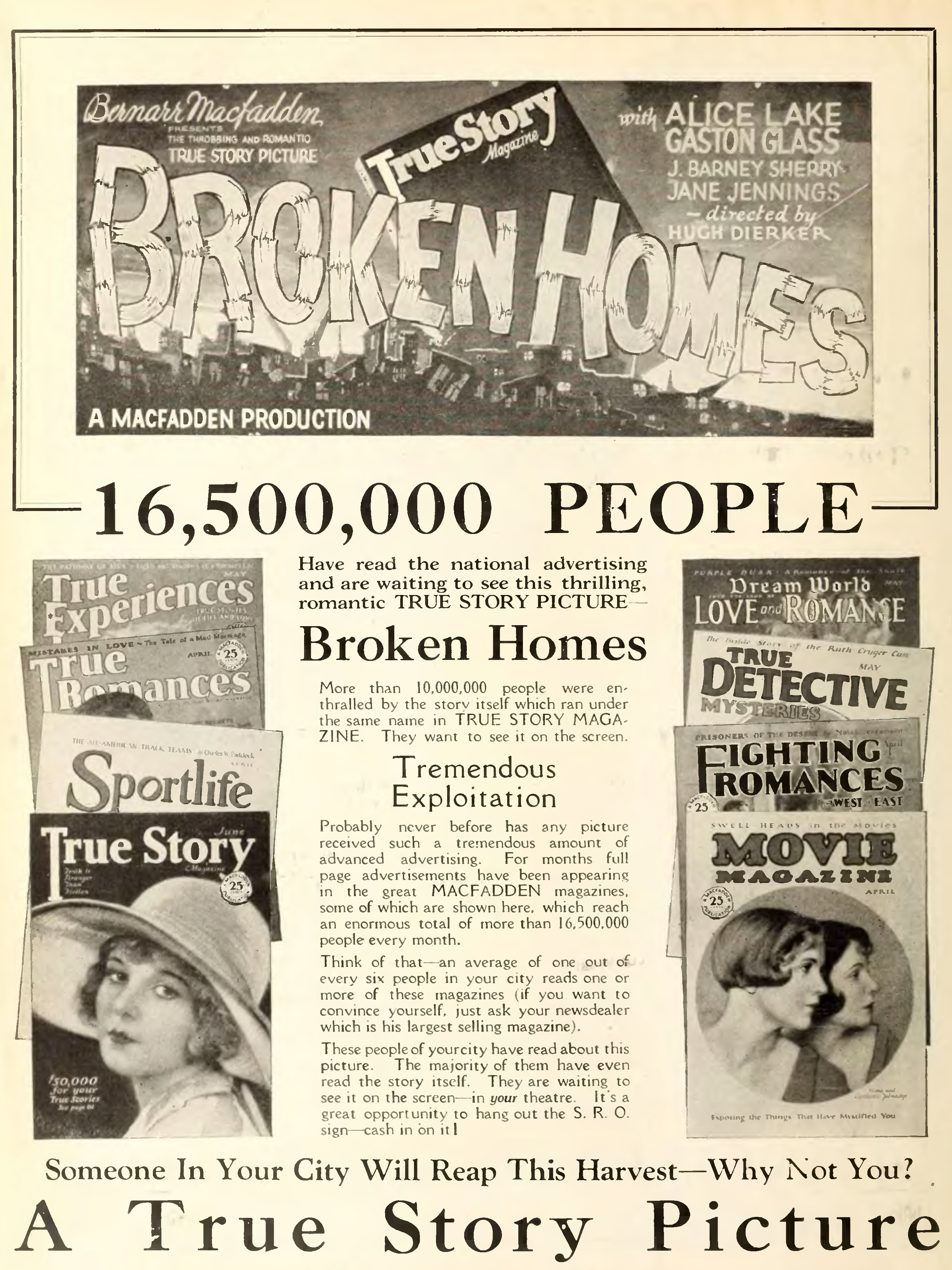
- Directed by: Hugh Dierker
- Written by: Lewis Allen Browne
- Produced by: Bernarr Macfadden
- Starring: Gaston Glass; Alice Lake; J. Barney Sherry
- Production company: MacFadden True Story Pictures
- Distributed by: Astor Pictures
- Release date: February 15, 1925
- Running time: 50 minutes
- Country: United States
- Languages: Silent; English intertitles

Broken Homes is a 1926 American silent drama film directed by Hugh Dierker and starring Gaston Glass, Alice Lake and J. Barney Sherry.

== Cast ==
- Gaston Glass as John Merritt
- Alice Lake as Arline
- J. Barney Sherry as Mr. Merritt - John's Father
- Jane Jennings
- Ruth Stonehouse

== Bibliography ==
- Munden, Kenneth White. The American Film Institute Catalog of Motion Pictures Produced in the United States, Part 1. University of California Press, 1997.
