= Camille of the Barbary Coast =

1925 film

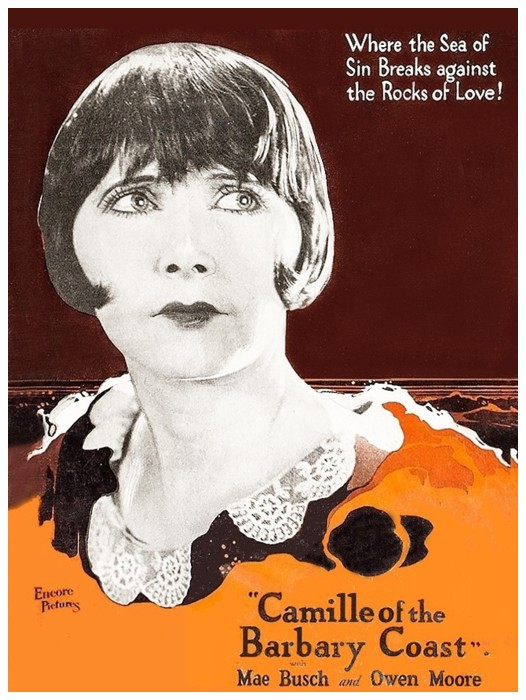
- Advertisement
- Directed by: Hugh Dierker
- Written by: Forrest Halsey; Eugene Edward Holland
- Starring: Mae Busch; Owen Moore; Fritzi Brunette
- Cinematography: Frank Zucker
- Production company: Encore Pictures
- Distributed by: Associated Exhibitors; Ideal Films (UK)
- Release date: November 1, 1925
- Running time: 60 minutes
- Country: United States
- Language: Silent (English intertitles)

Camille of the Barbary Coast is a 1925 American silent drama film directed by Hugh Dierker that starred Mae Busch, Owen Moore, and Fritzi Brunette.

== Plot ==
As described in a film magazine reviews, Bob Norton, thoroughly soured on humanity in general, has just left the penitentiary where he served a two-year sentence for larceny, following his wealthy father's refusal to help him. Dejected, and with only four of the ten dollars given him on his release left, he wanders into a Barbary Coast dance hall and meets Camille. His sportsmanship in parting with his last dollar for a bottle of wine for her appeals to the girl. She tries to help him, but her insistence upon lending him money is of no avail, but she succeeds in forcing him to allow her to provide a place for him to sleep until he finds work. All her best instincts come to the surface in mothering him, at the same time working out her own salvation, and making a real man of him. The father, Henry Norton, has been secretly watching his son's regeneration and accepts the young woman at her true worth as his son's wife.

== Cast ==
- Mae Busch as Camille Balishaw
- Owen Moore as Robert Morton
- Fritzi Brunette as Maggie Smith
- Burr McIntosh as Henry Norton
- Harry T. Morey as Dan McCarthy
- Tammany Young as Barbary Bennie
- Dorothy Janis as Dora Malcolm
- William Robert Daly as Chauncey Hilburn
- Dagmar Godowsky as Sonia Ivanoria

== Censorship ==
Before Camille of the Barbary Coast could be exhibited in Kansas, the Kansas Board of Review required several eliminations. All puffing on cigarettes and scenes of drinking were removed, scenes where Camille's breasts are exposed, girl taking money from stocking, kissing scenes in Camille's apartment, and episode of man at bedroom door taking a key.

== Bibliography ==
- Munden, Kenneth White. The American Film Institute Catalog of Motion Pictures Produced in the United States, Part 1. University of California Press, 1997.
