= Hugh Dierker =

Film director

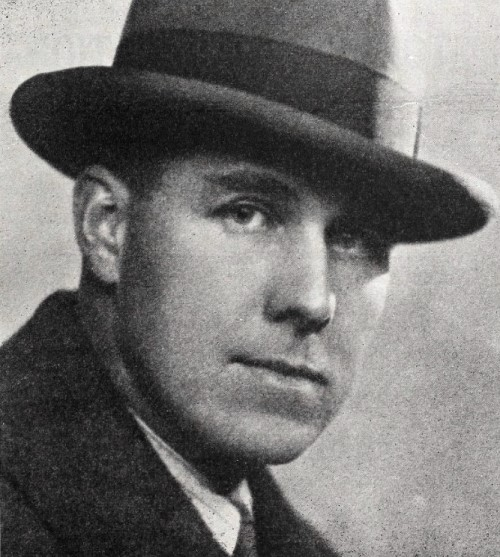
From a 1925 magazine

Hugh E. Dierker (1890 – 1975) was an American film director and producer.

== Biography ==
Dierker worked at Pathé. By 1920 he had established his own production company, Hugh Dierker Productions.

Junior Coghlan wrote about him in his autobiography. A photograph of him and Bebe Daniels appeared in the Los Angeles Herald April 14, 1922 in connection with a showing of his production When Dawn Came. His wife authored the story and is given a dedication on the associated songbook.

In 1912 he contracted for a garage building in Los Angeles.

== Filmography ==
- When Dawn Came (1920)
- The Other Side (1922)
- Cause for Divorce (1923)
- False Pride (1925)
- Camille of the Barbary Coast (1925)
- The Wrongdoers (1925) with Lionel Barrymore
- Broken Homes (1926)
- Things Wives Tell (1926)
