= Into the Net =

1924 film

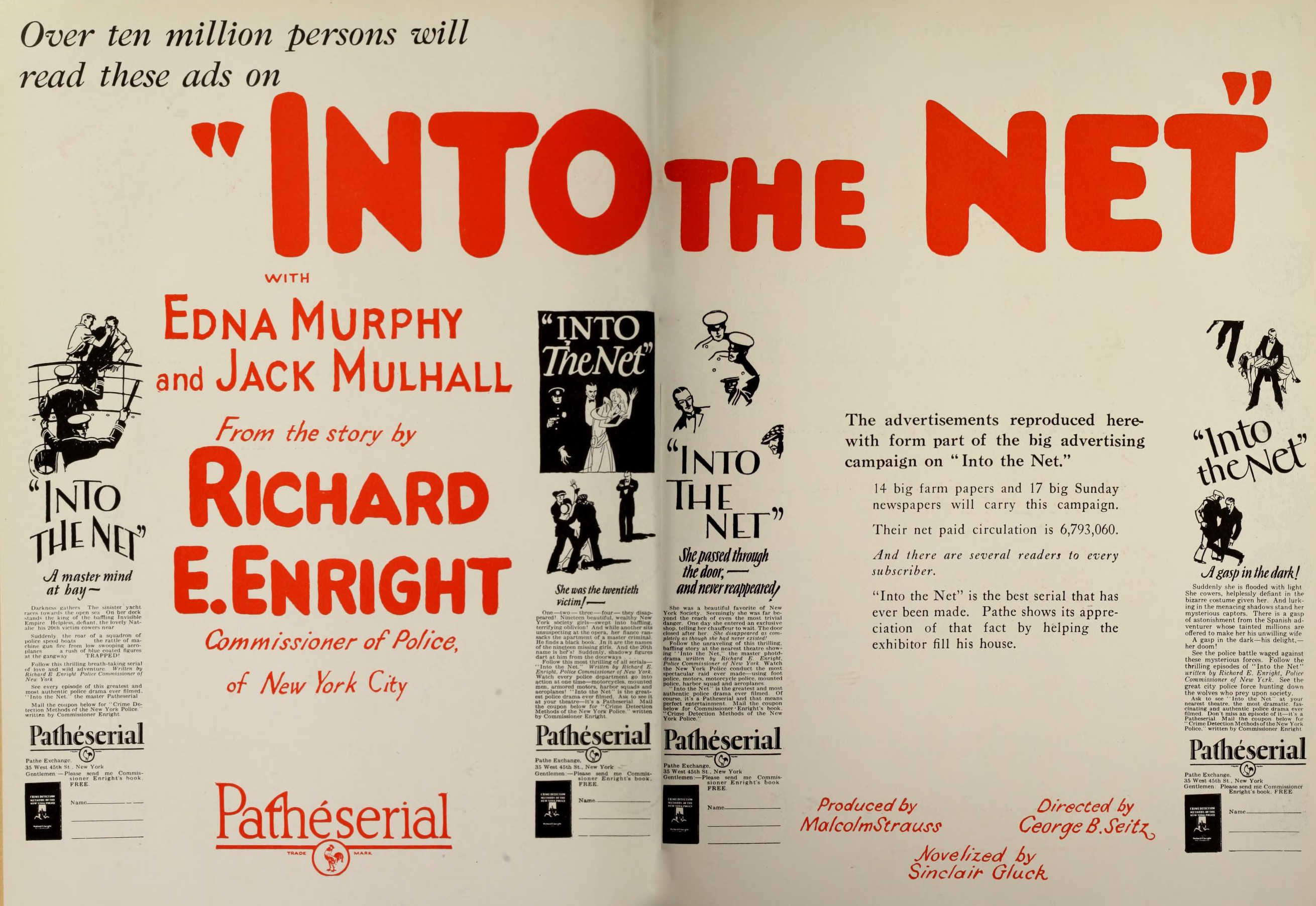
- Advertisement from a trade magazine
- Directed by: George B. Seitz
- Written by: Richard E. Enright; Frank Leon Smith
- Produced by: Malcolm Strauss
- Starring: Edna Murphy; Jack Mulhall
- Distributed by: Pathé Exchange
- Release date: August 3, 1924
- Running time: 10 episodes
- Country: United States
- Language: Silent (English intertitles)

Into the Net (1924)

Into the Net is a 1924 American silent crime serial film directed by George B. Seitz. A print of Into the Net with French intertitles survives.

== Cast ==
- Edna Murphy as Natalie Van Cleef
- Jack Mulhall as Bob Clayton
- Constance Bennett as Madge Clayton
- Bradley Barker as Bert Moore
- Frank Lackteen as Dr. Vining
- Frances Landau as Mrs. Fawcette
- Harry Semels as Ivan Invanovitch
- Tom Goodwin as Inspector Cabot
- Paul Porter as The Emperor
- Tom Blake

== Chapter titles ==
1. The Shadow of the Web
2. The Clue
3. Kidnapped
4. Hidden Talons
5. The Raid
6. The House of the Missing
7. Ambushed
8. The Escape
9. To the Rescue
10. Into the Toils

== See also ==
- List of film serials
- List of film serials by studio
