= The Silent Hero =

1927 film

- Directed by: Duke Worne
- Written by: H.H. Van Loan; George W. Pyper
- Produced by: W. Ray Johnston; Duke Worne
- Starring: Robert Frazer; Edna Murphy; Joseph W. Girard
- Cinematography: Ernest F. Smith
- Production company: Duke Worne Productions
- Distributed by: Rayart Pictures
- Release date: August 1927
- Running time: 60 minutes
- Country: United States
- Languages: Silent; English intertitles

The Silent Hero is a 1927 American silent Western film directed by Duke Worne and starring Robert Frazer, Edna Murphy and Joseph W. Girard.

A man travels north to take part in the Alaska Gold Rush, leaving the woman he loves behind. A rival tries to win her over and later also claim jump on the hero's gold strike.

== Cast ==
- Robert Frazer as Bud Taylor
- Edna Murphy as Mary Stoddard
- Ernest Hilliard as Wade Burton
- Joseph W. Girard as John Stoddard
- Harry Allen as Blinky
- Napoleon the Dog as Phantom - the Dog

== Bibliography ==
- Connelly, Robert B. The Silents: Silent Feature Films, 1910-36, Volume 40, Issue 2. December Press, 1998.
