= James O. Barrows =

American actor (1855–1925)

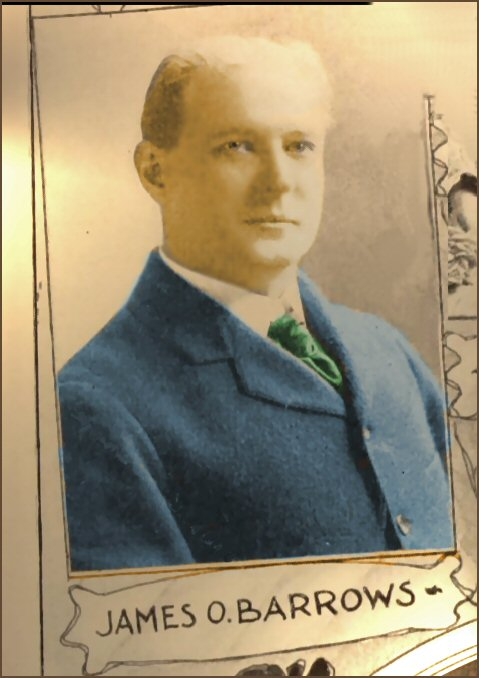
- Barrows in ad for "Brown's in town", 1898
- Born: James Otis Barrows; March 29, 1855; Copperopolis, California
- Died: December 7, 1925 (aged 70); Los Angeles, California
- Other name: James O. Barrow
- Occupation: Actor
- Years active: 1870s - 1925

James Otis Barrows (March 29, 1855 - December 7, 1925) was an American stage and film actor. He spent much of his adult life in the legitimate theater from the Victorian to Edwardian to Georgian eras.

Barrows debuted "as a super" at the California Theatre in San Francisco, after which he acted with a touring stock company in the Northwest before returning to San Francisco to act in stock productions at the Baldwin Theatre and the Grand Opera House. Later, he acted in Boston with the Castle Square Theatre's stock company before partnering with John Lancaster and moving into vaudeville to do dramatic sketches. He spent half a dozen years in vaudeville. In 1919 he began appearing in silent feature films playing elderly roles much like theater colleagues of his generation i.e. Melbourne MacDowell, Ida Waterman, Joseph J. Dowling, Frank Currier and Theodore Roberts. Barrows can be seen in several surviving silent films, his last being the 1926 John Barrymore starrer The Sea Beast completed just before his death.

== Filmography ==
- Brothers Divided (1919)
- The Lord Loves the Irish (1919)
- The Inferior Sex (1920)
- The White Dove (1920)
- When Dawn Came (1920)
- Dangerous to Men (1920)
- The Untamed (1920)
- Down Home (1920)
- Unseen Forces (1920)
- Silent Years (1921)
- The Call of Home (1922)
- Hurricane's Gal (1922)
- White Shoulders (1922)
- Pawned (1922)
- The Pride of Palomar (1922)(*as James Barrows)
- When Love Comes (1922)
- Shadows of the North (1923)
- Cause for Divorce (1923)
- Stephen Steps Out (1923)
- The Old Fool (1923)
- Fight and Win (1924)
- Young Ideas (1924)
- The Signal Tower (1924)
- The Gaiety Girl (1924)
- The Title Holder (1924) (*short)
- Her Night of Romance (1924)
- The Tomboy (1924)
- Daddy's Gone A-Hunting (1925)
- The Price of Pleasure (1925)
- The Goose Woman (1925)
- The Sea Beast (1926)
