= The Black Diamond Express =

1927 film

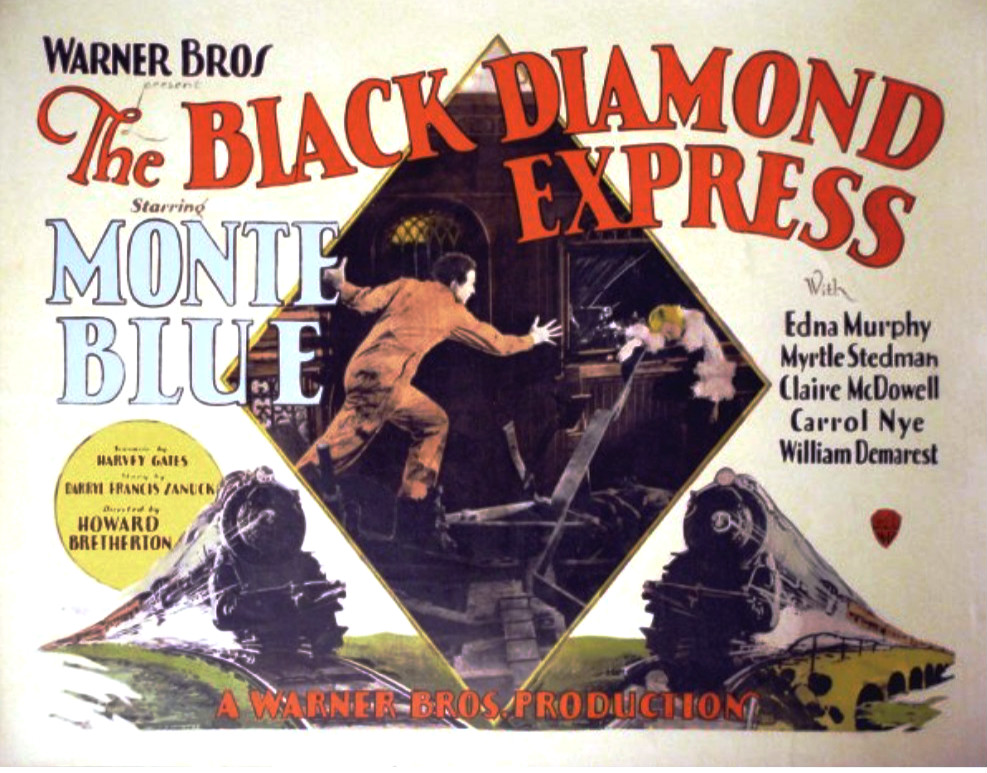
- Theatrical release poster
- Directed by: Howard Bretherton
- Written by: Harvey Gates
- Story by: "Mark Canfield" (Darryl Zanuck)
- Starring: Monte Blue; Edna Murphy
- Cinematography: David Abel; Conrad Wells
- Production company: Warner Bros.
- Distributed by: Warner Bros.
- Release date: June 4, 1927
- Running time: 60 minutes (6 reels; 5,803 feet (1,769 m))
- Country: United States
- Languages: Silent (English titles); Vitaphone (music score and sound effects)

The Black Diamond Express is a 1927 silent railroad feature film drama directed by Howard Bretherton and starring Monte Blue. It was produced and distributed by Warner Bros. It is not to be confused with several early short actuality styled films under the title Black Diamond Express for example the famous and still exiting 1896 film of a train arriving in a station.

This film is presumed lost.

== Cast ==
- Monte Blue as Dan Foster
- Edna Murphy as Jeanne Harmon
- Myrtle Stedman as Mrs. Harmon
- Claire McDowell as Martha, Dan's sister
- Carroll Nye as Fred, Dan's brother
- William Demarest as Fireman
- J. W. Johnston as Sheldon Truesdell

== See also ==
- List of early Warner Bros. sound and talking features
