= The Magnificent Brute =

The Magnificent Brute may refer to:

- The Magnificent Brute (1921 film), directed by Robert Thornby
- The Magnificent Brute (1936 film), directed by John G. Blystone
