= Taking Chances (disambiguation) =

Taking Chances is a 2007 album by Celine Dion.

Taking Chances or Taking Chance may also refer to:

- "Taking Chances" (song), first single from 2007 album by Celine Dion
- Taking Chances World Tour, 2007–2008 concert tour by Celine Dion
- Taking Chances World Tour: The Concert, 2010 album by Celine Dion
- Taking Chances (1922 film), American adventure comedy
- Taking Chances (1979 film), a Canadian short docudrama film
- Taking Chances (2009 film), American comedy
- Taking Chance, 2009 American television film drama
- Taking Chances, a 1906 play by Anthony E. Wills
