= Elmer Dewey =

Silent film actor

Elmer Dewey was an actor in silent films. He was also known as Dan Danilo.

== Filmography ==
- Girls Don't Gamble (1921) as Stanley Marr
- Bring Him In (1921) as Baptiste
- Taking Chances (1922) as José Borquez
- The Escape (1926) as Silas Peele
- Shadows of Chinatown (1926)
- Million Dollar Mystery (1927) as Boris Orloff
- The Charge of the Gauchos (1928) as French
