= Avenging Fangs =

1927 film

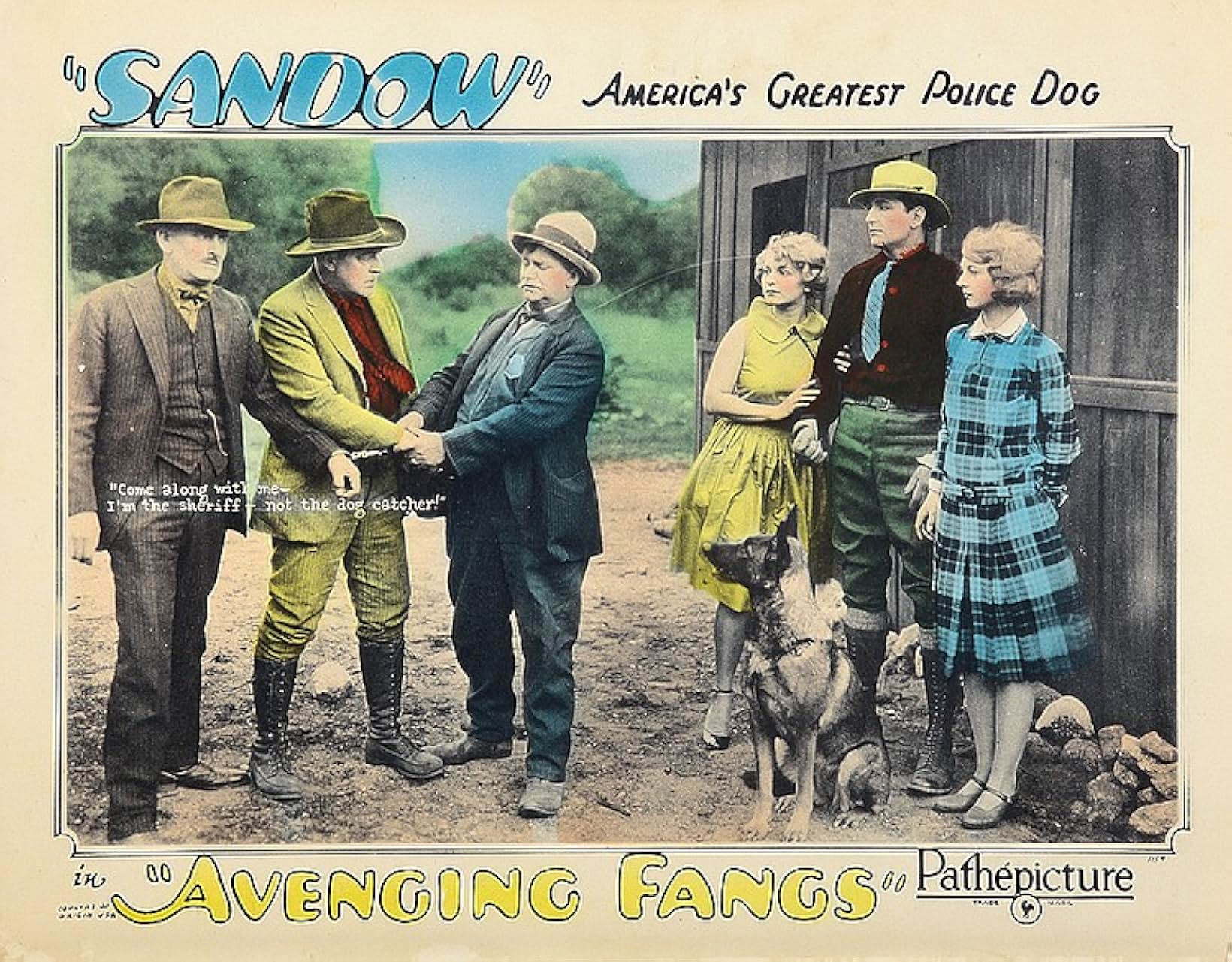
- Directed by: Ernest Van Pelt
- Written by: George W. Pyper
- Starring: Kenneth MacDonald; Helen Lynch
- Cinematography: James S. Brown Jr.
- Production company: Chesterfield Pictures
- Distributed by: Pathé Exchange
- Release date: June 5, 1927
- Running time: 50 minutes
- Country: United States
- Languages: Silent; English intertitles

Avenging Fangs is a 1927 American silent action film directed by Ernest Van Pelt and starring Kenneth MacDonald and Helen Lynch. It was a showcase for Sandow the Dog, a prospective rival for the popular Rin Tin Tin.

== Cast ==
- Sandow the Dog as Sandow
- Kenneth MacDonald as Dick Mansfield
- Helen Lynch as Mary Kirkham
- Jack Richardson as Trigger Kincaid
- Max Asher as Sheriff

== Preservation ==
With no holdings located in archives, Avenging Fangs is considered a lost film.

== Bibliography ==
- Jeanine Basinger. Silent Stars. Wesleyan University Press, 2000.
