= Foolish Wives =

1922 film directed by Erich von Stroheim

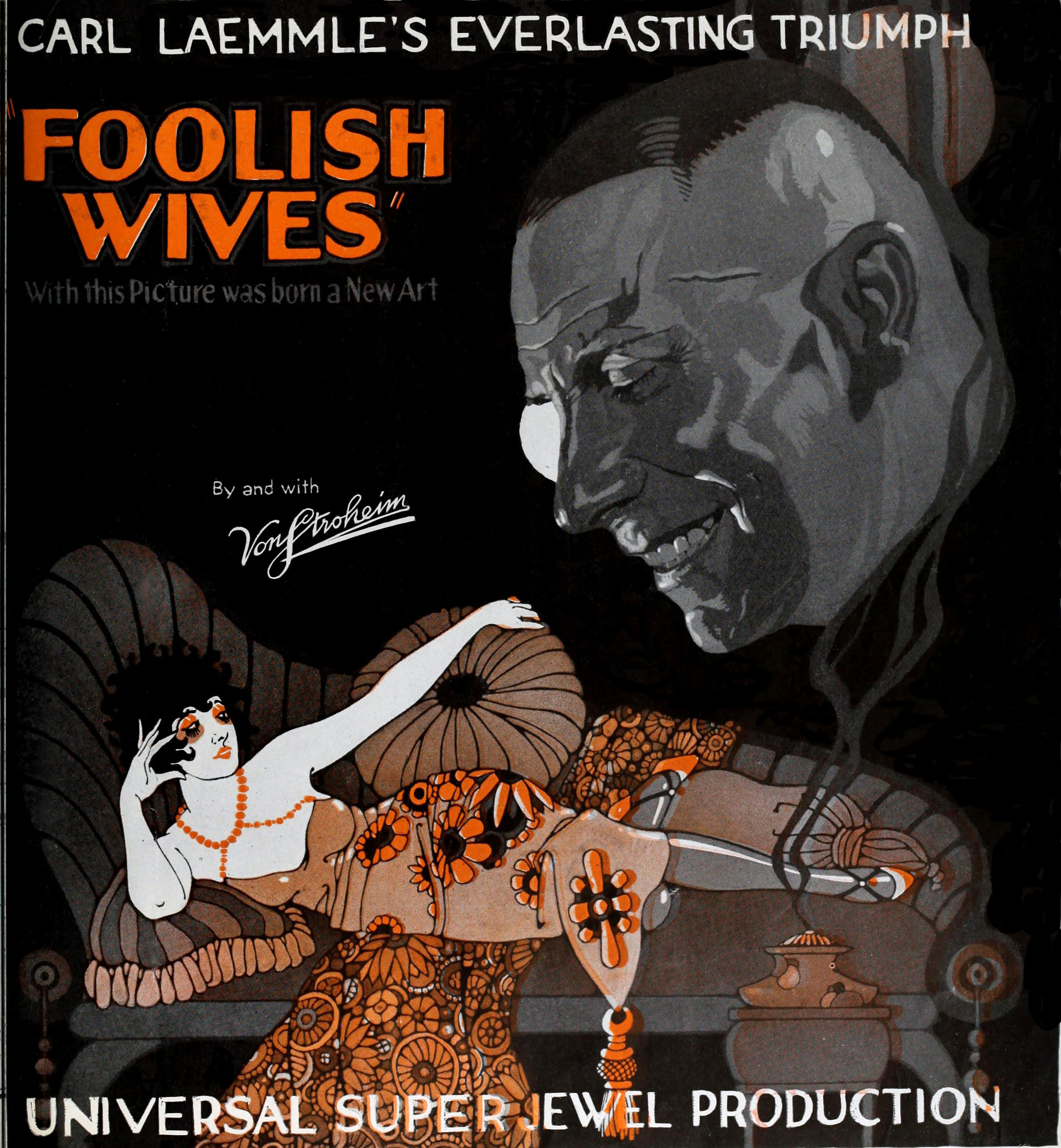
- Theatrical release poster
- Directed by: Erich von Stroheim
- Written by: Erich von Stroheim
- Produced by: Carl Laemmle; Erich von Stroheim
- Starring: Erich von Stroheim; Miss DuPont; Maude George
- Cinematography: William H. Daniels; Ben F. Reynolds
- Edited by: Arthur Ripley
- Music by: Sigmund Romberg
- Production company: Jewel Productions
- Distributed by: Universal Film Manufacturing Company
- Release date: January 11, 1922
- Running time: 384 minutes (original cut); 117 minutes (original release); 142 minutes (2013 restoration); 147 minutes (2023 restoration)
- Country: United States
- Languages: Silent film English intertitles
- Budget: $1,103,736

Foolish Wives is a 1922 American erotic silent drama film produced and distributed by Universal Pictures under their Super-Jewel banner and written and directed by Erich von Stroheim. The drama features von Stroheim, Rudolph Christians, Miss DuPont, Maude George, and others.

When released in 1922, the film was the most expensive film made at that time, and billed by Universal Studios as the "first million-dollar movie" to come out of Hollywood. Originally, von Stroheim intended the film to run anywhere between 6 and 10 hours, and be shown over two evenings, but Universal executives opposed this idea. The studio bosses cut the film drastically before the release date.

Foolish Wives, and the widespread media coverage that added to its "sensational notoriety", elevated von Stroheim into the ranks of preeminent directors of the early 1920s.

In 2008, Foolish Wives was selected for preservation in the United States National Film Registry by the Library of Congress as being "culturally, historically, or aesthetically significant."

== Plot ==
A man adopts the name and title of Count Wladislaw Sergius Karamzin to seduce rich women and extort money from them.

He sets up shop in Monte Carlo, and we learn that his partners in crime (and possible lovers) are his cousins: "Princess" Vera Petchnikoff and "Her Highness" Olga Petchnikoff.

Count Karamzin begins his latest scam on the unworldly wife of an American envoy, Helen Hughes, even though her husband is nearby. He attempts to charm her, planning to eventually fleece her of her money. She is easily impressed by his faux-aristocratic glamor, to the chagrin of her dull, but sincere, husband. Karamzin also has his eye on two other women, Maruschka, a maid at the hotel, and Marietta, the mentally disabled daughter of one of his criminal associates, seeing them both as easy sexual prey.

In the climax, Maruschka, whom he seduced and abandoned, goes mad and sets fire to a building in which Karamzin and Mrs. Hughes are trapped. To save himself, Karamzin jumps, leaving Mrs Hughes in danger. She is saved by her devoted husband. Karamzin's public displays of selfishness and cowardice ensure that he is shunned by the high society by whom he craves to be accepted. Humiliated, he tries to restore his pride by seducing Marietta, the mentally disabled girl. Her father kills him, dumping his body in a sewer. Karamzin's "cousins" are arrested for being imposters and con artists.

== Cast ==
Foolish Wives complete film

- Rudolph Christians as Andrew J. Hughes, U.S. Special-Envoy to Monaco
- Miss DuPont as Helen Hughes, His Wife
- Maude George as Her Highness Olga Petchnikoff
- Mae Busch as Princess Vera Petchnikoff
- Erich von Stroheim as Count Wladislaw Sergius Karamzin, Russian Captain of Hussars
- Dale Fuller as Maruschka, A Maid
- Al Edmundson as Pavel Pavlich, A Butler
- Cesare Gravina as Cesare Ventucci, A Counterfeiter
- Malvina Polo as Marietta, His Half-Witted Daughter
- C. J. Allen as Albert I, Prince of Monaco
- Louise Emmons as Mother Garoupe (uncredited)
- Nigel De Brulier as Monk (uncredited)
- Agnes Emerson as A Bit Role
- Harrison Ford as Rude Soldier / Armless Soldier (uncredited)
- Valerie Germonprez as An Extra (uncredited)
- Mrs. Kent as Dr. Judd's Wife (uncredited)
- Mme. Kopetzky as An Actress
- Mary Philbin as A Crippled Girl (uncredited)
- Edward Reinach as Monaco Secretary of State (uncredited)
- Louis K. Webb as Dr. Judd (uncredited)

Cast notes

- Robert Edeson replaced Rudolph Christians as Andrew J. Hughes when Christians died during production. Edeson was filmed entirely from the back.

== Background ==
When von Stroheim prepared to embark on his third project with Universal Pictures, he was basking in the accolades earned from his back-to-back successes with Blind Husbands (1919) and The Devil's Pass Key (1920).

When his Universal contract expired, von Stroheim was sought after by the big film studios. Universal's vice-president and publicity director, R. H. Cochrane, eager to retain their "new discovery", agreed to a substantial increase in von Stroheim's remuneration. Producer Laemmle was outraged when he discovered Cochrane's largesse, but acquiesced to a fait accompli. Set construction on the Universal back lot was already under way by 6 April 1920, before von Stroheim had renegotiated and signed the contract.

Universal's most "lavish and ambitious project" to date, Foolish Wives was conceived by Carl Laemmle and reflected an industry-wide trend toward elaborate productions in a bid to lure audiences with "spectacle, melodrama and sex".

== Production ==
The working title for the picture was Monte Carlo, referring to Europe's gambling mecca and the setting for von Stroheim's "clash of American and European ideals in post-war Europe" revisiting his themes from previous films.

"The production history of Foolish Wives was a nightmare without precedent, a bad dream from which von Stroheim never fully recovered." - Biographer Richard Koszarski

Universal built enormous facade-facsimiles of the French Riviera's most exclusive casino and entertainment complex. A separate set was constructed on the Monterey Peninsula, 300 miles north of Universal Studios, providing panoramic views of the Pacific Ocean that resembled the Mediterranean coast along the French Riviera. The almost "inaccessible" site atop Point Lopus was subject to severe weather, resulting in extensive and costly damage to the stage sets.

Von Stroheim and his cadre of highly competent and loyal technicians increasingly prioritized the production of Foolish Wives at the expense of other Universal projects, effectively "taking over the studio". Carl Laemmle promoted the 20-year-old producer Irving Thalberg to head of production and gave him the task of bringing von Stroheim's extravagant consumption of studio resources under control.

Thalberg, an able administrator and skilled at taking the measure of movie directors, presented von Stroheim with a scheme to expedite the completion of the film, reminding him he was contractually bound to submit to the production manager directives. Anticipating this contretemps, von Stroheim defiantly rejected Thalberg's authority, "Remove me as the director and you remove me as the star, and you don't have a picture". Von Stroheim resumed filming on his own terms. This film marks the onset of Erich von Stroheim's reputation as a "perfectionist" who, for the sake of "authenticity", insisted upon extravagance and costly sets and shooting schedules for his films.

Universal's publicity department reacted to the reports of massive cost overruns by presenting them as virtues. The public was subjected to advertising stunts that cheerfully enumerated von Stroheim's directorial eccentricities and excesses, real or imagined. One true story demonstrates the director's penchant for realistic artifacts, in which facsimile 1000 franc notes used in the casino sequences had been ordered manufactured by photoengrave technique—a counterfeiting method. Treasury Department officials were alerted and promptly took von Stroheim and the engravers into custody, then released them. The matter was finally resolved after protracted litigation.

The extravagant spending on Foolish Wives proceeded unabated when von Stroheim travelled to Point Lopus to shoot the coastal scenes and those requiring continuity linkage with shots made at Universal's backlot. Freed from any direct supervision by Universal executives at this remote location, von Stroheim improvised by adding to the script, incurring costly delays and added overtime expenditures. Alarmed at these excesses, Thalberg summarily cut all direct funding to the Point Lopus operation. Von Stroheim responded by arranging all expenses to be charged to the studio and continued shooting.

On 7 February 1921, actor Rudolph Christians who played one of the central roles in Foolish Wives, died unexpectedly. A dreaded calamity in a film that was so advanced in production, several key scenes with Christians' character remained to be filmed. Von Stroheim was unable to discover any satisfying or convincing cinematic technique to compensate for the loss despite enlisting a double for the deceased Christians. When von Stroheim proposed a major reshooting of the film with Christians' look-alike stand-in Robert Edeson, Thalberg emphatically rejected it and ordered that camera and equipment be collected and returned to the studio. The filming phase of Foolish Wives was terminated on 15 June 1921.

In the summer of 1921, von Stroheim and his staff began the arduous process of editing the 326,000 feet of bulk footage from which Foolish Wives would be carved. Superfluous material was eliminated (retakes, duplicates, damaged footage), leaving von Stroheim with about 150,000 feet with which to craft his story.

During the editing phase, Universal became alarmed when the alleged Fatty Arbuckle scandal was taken up by the tabloids, believing Foolish Wives and its romantic intrigue and lurid sexual overtones threatened to link the film in the public mind to this story. To dispel concerns among official censors and counter negative public reaction, Universal organized all expense paid trips to the upscale Beverly Hills Hotel for the assembled censors to view an all-night rough-cut screening of Foolish Wives, presented on 18 August 1921. The guests were urged to identify objectionable scenes that might be removed before general distribution. An outraged Stroheim protested, demanding that the 17,000 foot work be released as is, but shown on two consecutive nights, Universal summarily removed him from any further role in the editing.

For the film's premiere, Foolish Wives passed through the hands of several Universal editorial employees in order to bring the footage from 30 reels down to studio 14 reels. By the end of November, the picture had been reduced to 18 reels. To meet the 11 January 1922 premiere deadline, a special train carriage with cutting apparatus was provided so that a team of editors could complete the cutting en route from Hollywood to New York.

== Post-production ==
At a length of 3 ½ hours and approximately 14,000 feet, Foolish Wives premiered at New York's Central Theatre on 11 January 1922. Following the showing, Universal cut a further 3500 feet in order to comply with the New York State Censorship Board. This 10-reel print was the format released to general audiences. In 1928, Universal subjected the film to a major overhaul as part of a general reissue "completely restructuring the narrative and changing the names and descriptions of the characters." In 1936 the Museum of Modern Art obtained a copy of this 7655 foot 1928 cut, believing it was the general release version distributed in 1922 and presenting it as such to museum audiences.

== Reception ==
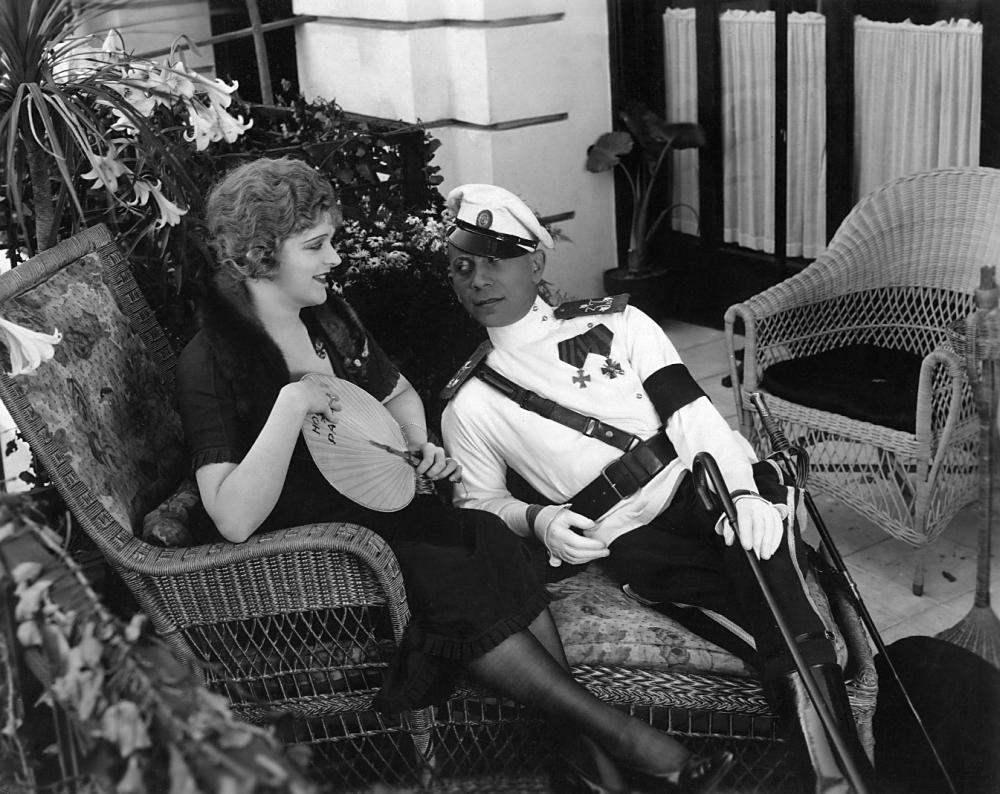
Count Karamzin (von Stroheim) seduces Helen Hughes (DuPont)

The film was expected to be a big success and play on Broadway for six months; however, it underperformed and only played at the Central for six weeks. It played two shows every day with a top ticket price of $2 and grossed just under $14,000 in its opening week. It became the eighth most popular movie of 1922 in North America.

=== Critical response ===
When released, Variety, in their review of the film, concentrated on the film's expensive costs and von Stroheim's involvement. They wrote "According to the Universal's press department, the picture cost $1,103,736.38; was 11 months and six days in filming; six months in assembling and editing; consumed 320,000 feet of negative, and employed as many as 15,000 extras for atmosphere. Foolish Wives shows the cost – in the sets, beautiful backgrounds and massive interiors that carry a complete suggestion of the atmosphere of Monte Carlo, the locale of the story. And the sets, together with a thoroughly capable cast, are about all the picture has for all the heavy dough expended. Obviously intended to be a sensational sex melodrama, Foolish Wives is at the same time frankly salacious ... Erich von Stroheim wrote the script, directed, and is the featured player. He's all over the lot every minute."

While praising the acting as excellent, Photoplay called the film "an insult to American ideals and womanhood".

In 1994, film critic Ed Gonzalez discussed the film and wrote "1922's Foolish Wives begins with the perfect iris shot. This is no ordinary 'fade into' effect, but an entrancing reinforcement of the sinister, insular and constrictive nature of the milieu Von Stroheim is about to introduce us to ... At the time of its release, Foolish Wives was the most expensive film ever produced, and though Von Stroheim was widely considered a lavish spendthrift, his films remain triumphs of period detail."

In 2008, critic Keith Phipps wrote "Foolish Wives re-creates Monte Carlo in a Hollywood back lot ... Playing a fraudulent aristocrat, in a touch that echoed his own biography, Von Stroheim dupes the gullible, lusts after a retarded teenager, and attempts to undo an innocent American. It's like a Henry James novel as dreamt by a pornographer, and it illustrates what makes Von Stroheim such a problematic genius: Is it nascent post-modernism or egotism run amok that made him prominently feature a character reading a novel called Foolish Wives, credited to Erich Von Stroheim?"

On Rotten Tomatoes, Foolish Wives has an approval rating of 89% based on 19 reviews with an average of 8.9/10.

== See also ==
- List of early color feature films

== Sources ==
- Koszarski, Richard (1983). The Man You Loved to Hate: Erich von Stroheim and Hollywood. Oxford: Oxford University Press. ISBN 0-19-503239-X.
