= Miss DuPont =

American actress (1894–1973)

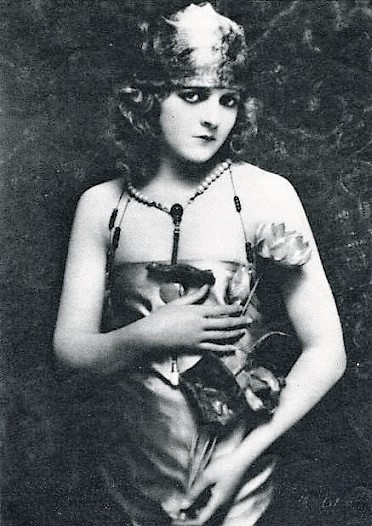
- DuPont in 1924
- Born: Patricia Hannon; April 28, 1894; Frankfort, Kentucky, U.S.
- Died: February 6, 1973 (aged 78); Palm Beach, Florida, U.S.
- Other names: Patty DuPont
- Occupation: Actress
- Years active: 1919–1927
- Spouse: Sylvanus Stokes (m. 1928)

Miss DuPont (born Patricia Hannon; April 28, 1894 – February 6, 1973) was an American film actress and fashion designer. She is perhaps best known for her roles in Foolish Wives (1922) and for a supporting role in the Clara Bow vehicle Mantrap (1926).

== Biography ==
Sometimes credited as Patty DuPont, Miss DuPont was born as Patricia Hannon in Frankfort, Kentucky, though sources sometimes state her place of birth as Frankfort, Indiana. She appeared as a wealthy and naive American woman seduced by Erich von Stroheim's odious count in Foolish Wives (1922). Although Stroheim is credited with discovering her, she had already made several films beginning in 1919 with The Day She Paid.

She was the second wife of Sylvanus Stokes. They met while he was traveling in Los Angeles shortly after his 1926 divorce from his first wife, Margaret Fahnestock Stokes, and were married in January 1928. She was living on Via Linda in Palm Beach, Florida, near the Palm Beach Country Club, in 1958. Miss DuPont died in Palm Beach in 1973.

== Filmography ==
- Lombardi, Ltd. (1919)
- The Day She Paid (1919)
- Bonnie May (1920)
- The Rage of Paris (1921)
- Prisoners of Love (1921)
- False Kisses (1921)
- Foolish Wives (1922)
- The Golden Gallows (1922) *unknown/presumably lost
- A Wonderful Wife (1922)
- Shattered Dreams (1922)
- Brass (1923)
- The Broken Wing (1923)
- The Common Law (1923) *lost film
- The Man from Brodney's (1923) *incomplete
- What Three Men Wanted (1924)
- So This Is Marriage? (1924) *lost film
- One Night in Rome (1924)
- Sinners in Silk (1924) *lost film
- Raffles, the Amateur Cracksman (1925)
- Three Keys (1925)
- Accused (1925)
- Defend Yourself (1925)
- A Slave of Fashion (1925) *lost film
- Good and Naughty (1926) *lost film
- Mantrap (1926)
- That Model from Paris (1926)
- Hula (1927)
- The Wheel of Destiny (1927)
