= The Tomboy =

1924 film

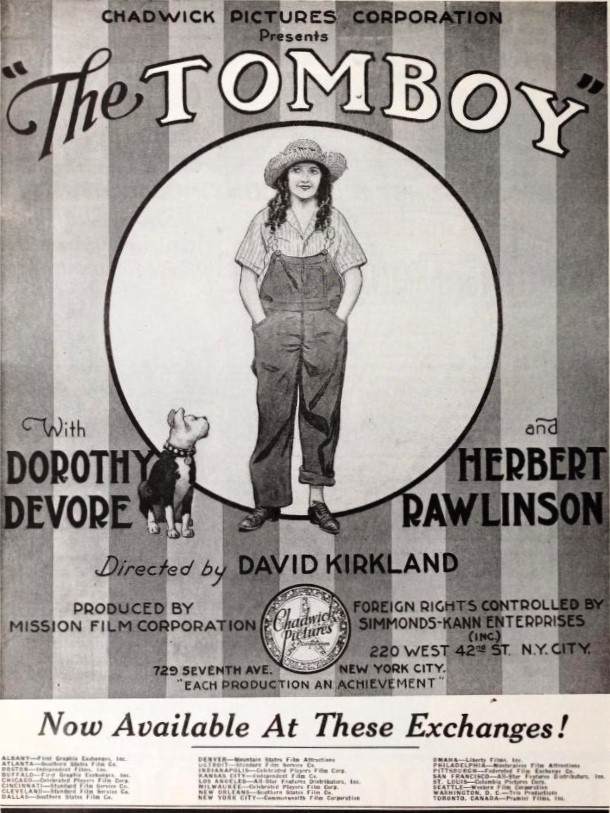
- Trade advertisement
- Directed by: David Kirkland
- Written by: Frank Mitchell Dazey (story)
- Produced by: IE Chadwick
- Starring: Herbert Rawlinson; Dorothy Devore
- Cinematography: Milton Moore
- Distributed by: Chadwick Pictures; State's Rights
- Release date: December 26, 1924
- Running time: 60 minutes
- Country: United States
- Language: Silent (English intertitles)

The Tomboy is a 1924 American silent comedy-drama film directed by David Kirkland and starring Herbert Rawlinson and Dorothy Devore.

== Plot ==
As described in a review in a film magazine, Tommy Smith (Devore), the village tomboy, runs a boarding house because her mother (Boardman) is dead and her father (Barrows) is lazy. A stranger appears and begins making love to Tommy. Coincident with her discovery of liquor in the barn and the fact that the stranger, Aldon Farwell (Rawlinson), is a revenue agent, she is led to believe that her father is a bootlegger. The Sheriff (Moran) is killed and her father is accused of the murder. Bootleggers make off with a truck and Aldon and Tommy join the chase. When captured, it develops that Rugby Blood (Gribbon), posing as an invalid, is the leader of the bootleggers and has been disguising as her father, while her father has been working on the case with Aldon. Tommy also discovers that Aldon's love for her is real.

== Cast ==
- Herbert Rawlinson as Aldon Farwell
- Dorothy Devore as Tommy Smith
- James O. Barrows as Henry Smith (credited as James Barrows)
- Lee Moran as Hiram, A Sheriff
- Helen Lynch as Sweetie Higgins
- Lottie Williams as Mrs. Higgins
- Harry Gribbon as Rugby Blood
- Virginia True Boardman as Mrs. Smith

== Preservation ==
A print of The Tomboy is preserved at the Library of Congress.
