= Wolves of the North (1921 film) =

1921 film

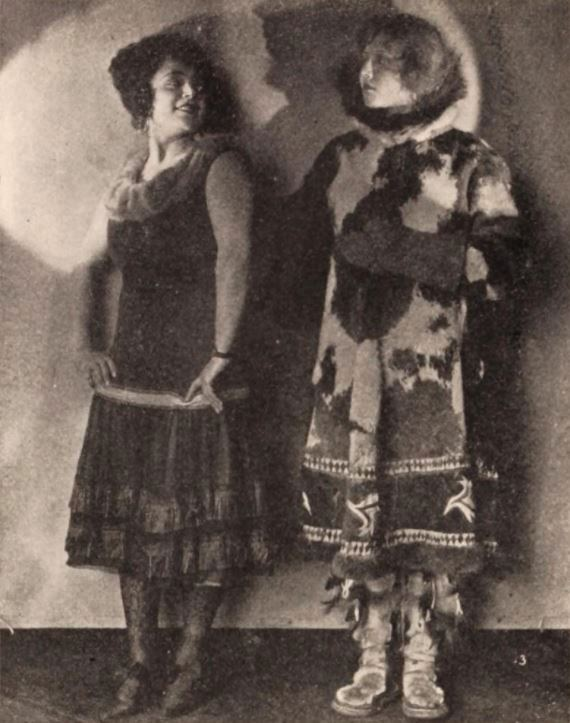
- Directed by: Norman Dawn
- Written by: Wallace Clifton; Norman Dawn
- Produced by: Carl Laemmle
- Starring: Herbert Heyes; Percy Challenger; Eva Novak
- Cinematography: Thomas Rea
- Production company: Universal Pictures
- Distributed by: Universal Pictures
- Release date: April 16, 1921
- Running time: 50 minutes
- Country: United States
- Languages: Silent; English intertitles

Wolves of the North is a 1921 American silent Western film directed by Norman Dawn and starring Herbert Heyes, Percy Challenger and Eva Novak. A print of Wolves of the North exists at the Deutsche Kinemathek film archive in Berlin, Germany.

== Cast ==
- Herbert Heyes as 'Wiki' Jack Horn
- Percy Challenger as Professor Norris
- Eva Novak as Aurora Norris
- Starke Patteson as David Waters
- Barbara Tennant as Jenfau Jen
- Eagle Eye as Massakee
- Clyde Tracy as Lech
- Millie Impolito as Rose of Spain

== Bibliography ==
- Munden, Kenneth White (1997) [1971]. The American Film Institute Catalog of Motion Pictures Produced in the United States, Part 1. University of California Press. ISBN 0520209699.
