= Three Weeks in Paris =

1925 film by Roy Del Ruth

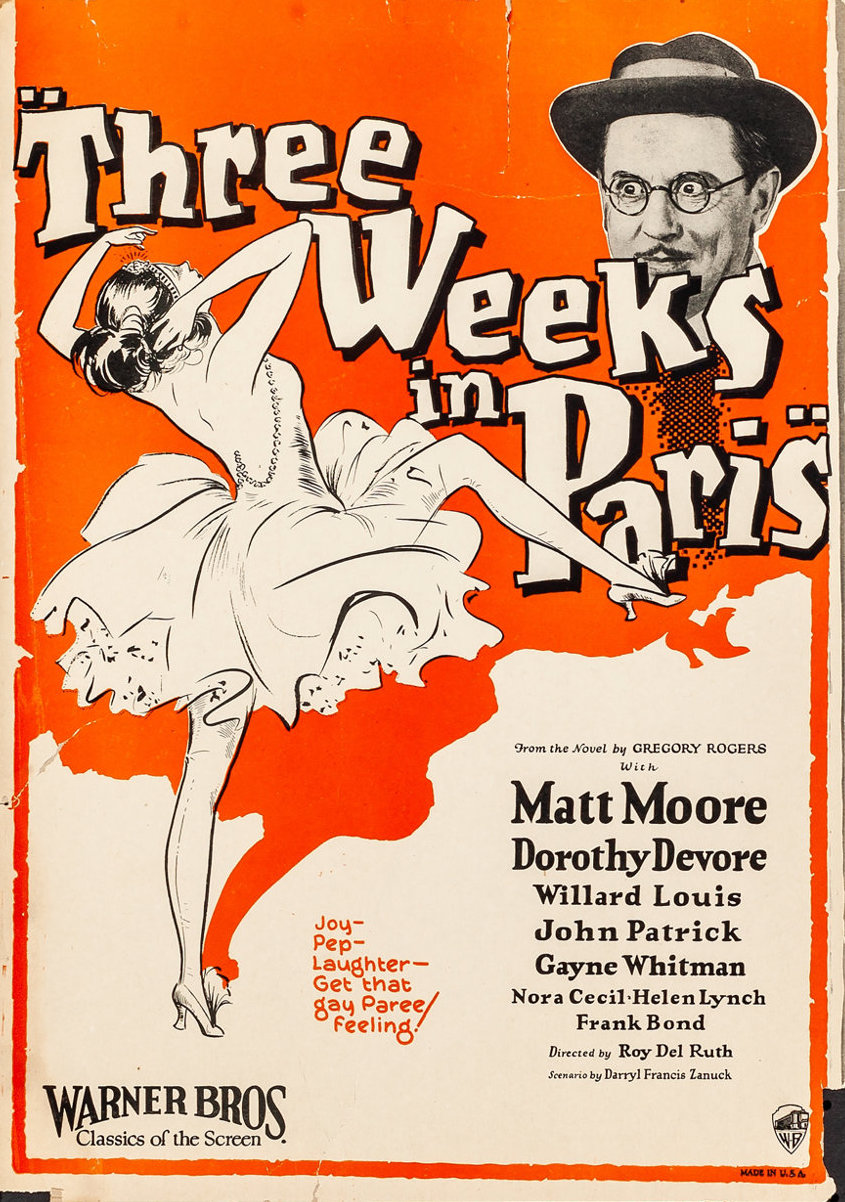
- Window card for the film
- Directed by: Roy Del Ruth
- Written by: Daryl Zanuck (story; as Gregory Rogers); Daryl Zanuck (scenario; as Daryl Zanuck)
- Starring: Matt Moore
- Cinematography: David Abel
- Edited by: Clarence Kolster
- Production company: Warner Bros.
- Distributed by: Warner Bros.
- Release date: December 5, 1925
- Running time: 6 reels (approximately 60 minutes)
- Country: United States
- Language: silent (English intertitles)

Three Weeks in Paris is a lost 1925 American silent comedy film from Warner Bros. starring Matt Moore and Dorothy Devore.

== Plot ==
As described in a film magazine review, Oswald Bates is getting married, but the wedding day has many bad omens as the date is Friday the thirteenth, a black cat crosses his path, and he breaks a mirror. After the wedding, just after he and his bride Mary leave the church, he is separated from her and gets a telegram which compels him to sail for Paris within the hour to complete a business deal. Although he tries, he is unsuccessful and leaves France without completing the deal. However, Oswald has been reported dead to Mary and she collects on the life insurance. Therefore, Oswald is forced to assume a disguise during his trip back home. Matters are complicated by a detective on board the ship and seas that cause many to become seasick. Just as he is reunited with Mary, the overseas deal is unexpectedly completed and provides the money which can repay the insurance so the couple can any avoid jail sentence.

== Cast ==
- Matt Moore as Oswald Bates
- Dorothy Devore as Mary Brown
- Willard Louis as Gus Billikins
- Helen Lynch as Dolly Withers
- Gayne Whitman as Duke Laporte
- John Patrick as Bruce Gordon
- Frank Bond as Alex Darrows
- Rosa Gore as Mrs. Brown

== Preservation ==
With no prints of Three Weeks in Paris located in any film archives, it is a lost film.
