= The Wine of Life =

1924 film

- Directed by: Arthur Rooke
- Written by: Maude Annesley (novel)
- Starring: Clive Brook; Juliette Compton; James Carew
- Production company: I.B. Davidson Productions
- Distributed by: Butcher's Film Service
- Release date: May 1924
- Country: United Kingdom
- Languages: Silent; English intertitles

The Wine of Life is a 1924 British silent drama film directed by Arthur Rooke and starring Clive Brook, Juliette Compton and James Carew. The screenplay concerns a newly divorced woman who falls in love with an artist and a hypnotist at the same time.

== Cast ==
- Betty Carter as Lady Branton
- Clive Brook as Michael Strong
- James Carew as Alva Cortez
- Juliette Compton as Regine
- Gertrude Sterroll as Mrs. Mainwaring
- Mildred Evelyn as Dorrie Richards
- Lucien Verne as Brian Westleigh

== Bibliography ==
- Low, Rachael. The History of British Film, Volume 4 1918-1929. Routledge, 1997.
