= The Wheel of Destiny =

1927 film

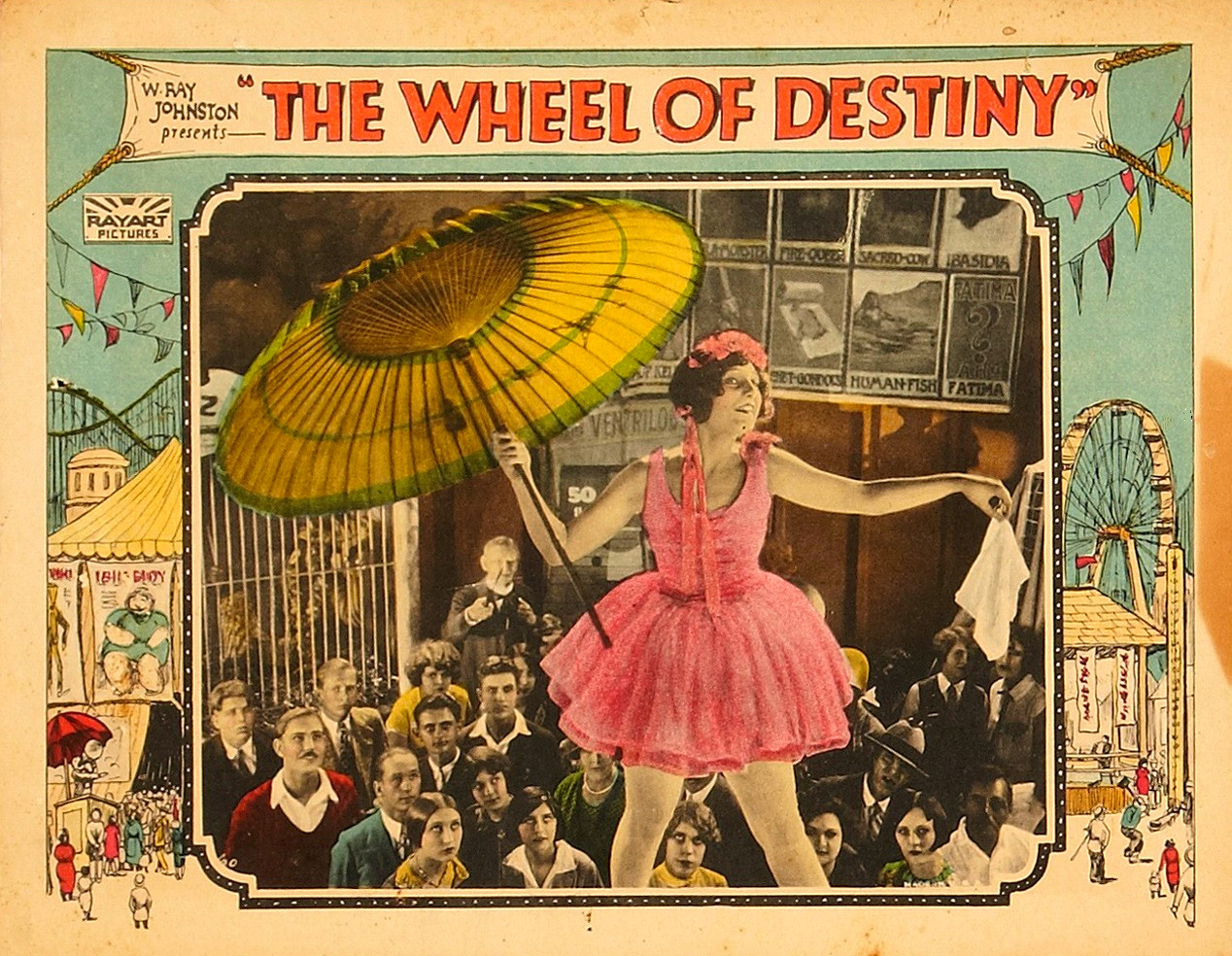
- Directed by: Duke Worne
- Written by: George W. Pyper
- Produced by: Duke Worne
- Starring: Forrest Stanley; Georgia Hale; Percy Challenger
- Cinematography: Walter L. Griffin
- Production company: Duke Worne Productions
- Distributed by: Rayart Pictures
- Release date: October 1927
- Running time: 60 minutes
- Country: United States
- Languages: Silent; English intertitles

The Wheel of Destiny is a 1927 American silent drama film directed by Duke Worne and starring Forrest Stanley, Georgia Hale and Percy Challenger.

== Synopsis ==
After being rejected by a snobbish society woman, a young man falls and loses his memory. He ends up in an amusement park where he gets a job and is befriended by a woman working in a sideshow. Eventually he regains his memory and returns home, but chooses to marry his new friend.

== Cast ==
- Forrest Stanley
- Georgia Hale
- Percy Challenger
- Miss DuPont
- Ernest Hilliard
- Sammy Blum
- Bynunsky Hyman
- Jack Herrick

== Bibliography ==
- Munden, Kenneth White. The American Film Institute Catalog of Motion Pictures Produced in the United States, Part 1. University of California Press, 1997.
