= Dorothy Devore =

American actress (1899–1976)

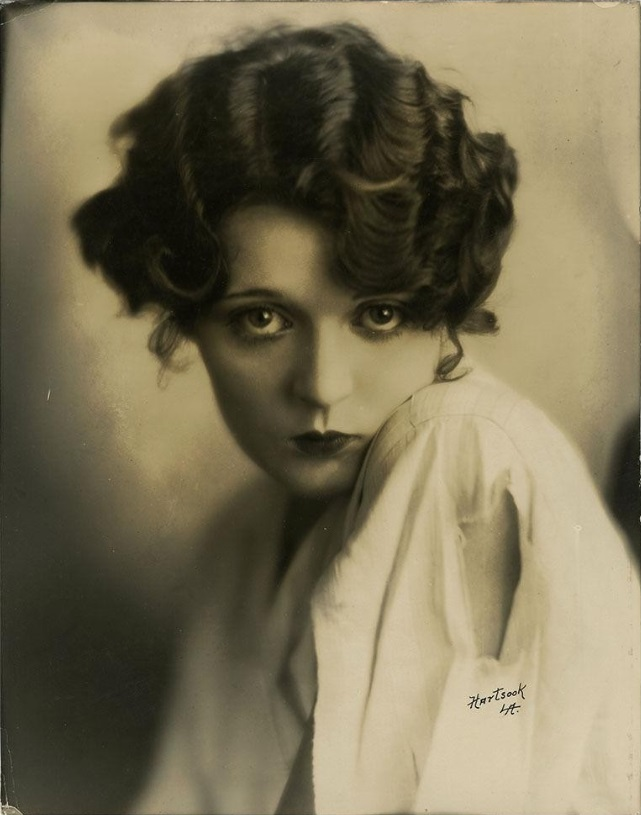
- Devore in 1922
- Born: Alma Inez Williams; June 22, 1899; Fort Worth, Texas, U.S.
- Died: September 10, 1976 (aged 77); Woodland Hills, California, U.S.
- Resting place: San Fernando Mission Cemetery, Mission Hills, Los Angeles, California, U.S.
- Occupation: Actress
- Years active: 1918–1930
- Spouse: Albert Wylie Mather (m. 1925; div. 1933)

Dorothy Devore (born Alma Inez Williams; June 22, 1899 – September 10, 1976) was an American silent film actress and comedian.

== Early life ==
Born Alma Inez Williams in Fort Worth, Texas, on June 22, 1899, her family soon moved to Los Angeles when she was still a young girl and completed her education there.

== Career ==
Before she began working in films, Devore sang at a cafe in Los Angeles.

Devore joined a musical comedy company, with which she appeared for one year. She then went to Lyons and Moran comedies at Universal Pictures. At Universal she was "discovered" by director and producer Al Christie She began playing in small parts in films for Christie, but soon received leads and moved from one-reelers to two-reelers, which would make her a star.

Devore specialized in comedic roles, such as in Know Thy Wife (1918), directed by Christie. Devore was chosen as one of the WAMPAS Baby Stars in 1923. During a good deal of her career, she achieved stardom in the comedic two-reel Christie Comedies, released through Educational.

A little time after her career kicked off, Christie loaned her out to play the female lead opposite Charles Ray in 45 Minutes from Broadway (1920). She made her last film, Take the Heir, in 1930 before retiring.

Devore produced films via her company, Dorothy Devore Comedies.

== Personal life ==
Devore married businessman Albert Wylie Mather on December 18, 1925, and filed for divorce in 1933. She died on September 10, 1976, in Woodland Hills, California, aged 77.

== Selected filmography ==
- The House Cleaning Horrors (1918) (*short)
- The Extra Bridegroom (1918) (*short)
- The Law of the North (1918) (*short)
- Please Hit Me (1918) (*short)
- Frenzied Film (1918) (*short)
- The Price of a Rotten Time (1918) (*short)
- Maid Wanted (1918) (*short)
- Camping Out (1918) (*short)
- Swat the Flirt (1918) (*short)
- String Beans (1918) (*uncredited)
- Know Thy Wife (1918) (*short)
- How's Your Husband? (1919) (*short)
- Sing, Rosa, Sing! (1919) (*short)
- Good Gracious, Bobby (1919) (*short)
- You Couldn't Blame Her (1919) (*short)
- 45 Minutes from Broadway (1920)
- The Magnificent Brute (1921)
- Hazel from Hollywood (1923)
- When Odds Are Even (1923)
- Getting Gertie's Goat (1924)
- Hold Your Breath (1924)
- The Tomboy (1924)
- The Narrow Street (1925)
- Who Cares (1925) -- (Survives Library of Congress)
- The Prairie Wife (1925)
- Three Weeks in Paris (1925)
- A Broadway Butterfly (1925)
- Fighting the Flames (1925)
- How Baxter Butted In (1925)
- The Midnight Flyer (1925)
- The Man Upstairs (1926)
- Señor Daredevil (1926)
- The Social Highwayman (1926)
- Money to Burn (1926)
- The Gilded Highway (1926)
- The First Night (1927)
- The Wrong Mr. Wright (1927)
- Mountains of Manhattan (1927)
- No Babies Wanted (1928)
- Take the Heir (1930)
