= Who Cares (1925 film) =

1925 film by David Kirkland

- Directed by: David Kirkland
- Written by: Douglas Z. Doty (scenario); Walter Anthony (intertitles)
- Based on: Who Cares by Cosmo Hamilton
- Produced by: Harry Cohn
- Starring: Dorothy Devore
- Cinematography: Allen Thompson
- Distributed by: Columbia Pictures
- Release date: February 1, 1925
- Running time: 59 minutes; 6 reels
- Country: United States
- Language: Silent (English intertitles)

Who Cares is a 1925 American silent drama film produced and distributed by Columbia Pictures and starring Dorothy Devore. It is based upon the 1919 novel by Cosmo Hamilton which had been previously filmed in 1919 as Who Cares?

Real life husband and wife, actors Vera and Ralph Lewis, play the grandparents.

== Cast ==
- Dorothy Devore as Joan
- William Haines as Martin
- Lloyd Whitlock as Gilbert Palgrave
- Beverly Bayne as Mrs. Hosack
- Wanda Hawley as Irene
- Vola Vale as Tootles
- Charles Murray as Greaves (credited as Charlie Murry)
- Vera Lewis as Grandmother Ludlow
- Ralph Lewis as Grandfather Ludlow
- William Austin as Dr. Harry Oldershaw
- Carrie Clark Ward as Housekeeper

== Preservation ==
A print of Who Cares is preserved in the Library of Congress collection.
