= Percy Challenger =

British-American actor (1858–1932)

Percy Challenger (September 3, 1858 – July 23, 1932) was a film and theater actor in the United States. He appeared in dozens of films.

He was born in England. He acted in and managed the eastern tour of Virginia Drew Prescott (Melbourne MacDowell)'s playlet Man of the People.

Challenger was a vaudeville actor. A 1911 performance in Chicago was reviewed by The Billboard, reading, "Percy Challenger, an English entertainer, was first on the program, and although his act was rather odd, it seemed to take very well. Mr. Challenger's work as an elocutionist was very good".

He won plaudits as a supporting actor in films. His performance in Flames of Chance (1918) was received as "clever" in a review in Variety. Variety reviewed his performance in Trumpet (1920) positively, noting, "Percy Challenger comes in for a bit in the role of Valinsky, a dunk-investor. The detail with which he dresses the character is striking. He also contributed valuable assistance..."

He continued his theatre involvement during his time in California. He was involved with Marion Warde Dramatic School in Los Angeles. He performed humorous monologues and pianologues at the opening of the Alhambra Community Theatre in November 1924.

Several months before he died, Challenger performed as various Dickens characters in La Canada, California. He died on July 23, 1932, in Los Angeles, California.

== Theater ==
- The Eel (1916)

== Filmography ==
- The Medicine Man (1916)
- Three Armed Maggie (1916)
- The Sudden Gentleman (1917), as Old Miles
- Ashes of Hope (1917), as Flat Foot
- The Spirit of Romance (film) (1917), as Richard Cobb
- The Law's Outlaw (1918), as Clarence Cecil Hartley
- The Lonely Woman (1918)
- Little Red Decides (1918), as Little Doc
- One Week of Life (1919)
- Blind Husbands (1919)
- What Every Woman Wants (1919 film), as Timothy Dunn
- One Week of Life (1919)
- In the Heart of a Fool (1920) as Daniel Sands
- Uncharted Channels (1920), as Roger Webb
- Trumpet Island (1920), as Valinsky
- The Cheater, as Mr. Prall
- False Kisses (1921)
- The Magnificent Brute (1921)
- Wolves of the North (1921)
- Her Mad Bargain (1921)
- The Sting of the Lash (1921), as Rorke
- Nobody's Fool (1921 film), as Joshua Alger
- Taking Chances (1922), as James Arlington
- Smilin' Jim (1922)
- Tracked to Earth (1922), as Zed White
- Wild Honey (1922 film), as Ebenezer Learnish
- The Galloping Kid (1922)
- Kissed (1922 film), as Editor Needham
- Around the World in 18 Days (1923), a serial, as Rand
- The Social Buccaneer (1923), a 10 episode serial, as Steele
- Single Handed (1923 film), as Professor Weighoff
- High Speed (1924)
- Sword of Valor (1924)
- The Wheel of Destiny (1927)
- The Sky Hawk (1929), as Charles the Butler (uncredited)
