= A Broadway Butterfly =

1925 film

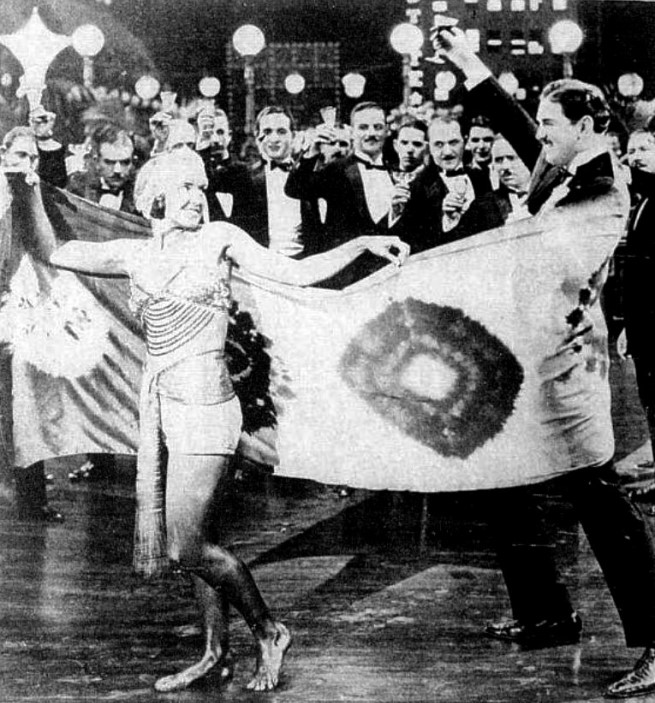
- Film still
- Directed by: William Beaudine
- Written by: "Gregory Rogers" (Darryl F. Zanuck)
- Story by: Pearl Keating
- Starring: Dorothy Devore
- Cinematography: Ray June
- Production company: Warner Bros.
- Distributed by: Warner Bros.
- Release date: March 29, 1925
- Running time: 70 minutes
- Country: United States
- Language: Silent (English intertitles)

A Broadway Butterfly is a 1925 American silent comedy film directed by William Beaudine.

== Plot ==
As described in a film magazine review, Irene Astaire is befriended by Cookie Dale and gets a job in the chorus, although Cookie is dismissed to please male backers of the show. Irene falls in love with a wealthy youth, Ronald Steel, but Crane Wilder wants Irene and plots with Thelma to disgrace Irene. Cookie foils them although Donald sees Wilder leaving Irene's apartment, and he turns to Thelma. Irene is discouraged and seeks diversion on Broadway. Cookie saves her again and it then develops Cookie is the runaway daughter of a wealthy family and Donald and Irene are once more united.

== Cast ==
- Dorothy Devore as Irene Astaire
- Louise Fazenda as Cookie Dale
- Willard Louis as Charles Gay
- John Roche as Crane Wilder
- Cullen Landis as Ronald Steel
- Lilyan Tashman as Thelma Perry
- Wilfred Lucas as Stage Manager
- Eugenia Gilbert as Riding Mistress
- Margaret Seddon as Mrs. Steel

== Censorship ==
Before A Broadway Butterfly could be exhibited in Kansas, the Kansas Board of Review required the removal of several scenes. The scenes removed were of an old man falling, a girl spreading roses on a dress, a woman putting on a stocking, pouring of a drink, a man entering a girl's room while she is asleep, and shortening of a scene where a dog is offered alcohol. The intertitle removed said "Why didn't you show me those instead of your eyes?"

== Status ==
With no prints of A Broadway Butterfly located in any film archives, it is a lost film.
