= Take the Heir =

1930 film

- Directed by: Lloyd Ingraham
- Written by: Beatrice Van
- Produced by: John R. Freuler; C.A. Stimson
- Starring: Edward Everett Horton; Dorothy Devore; Edythe Chapman
- Cinematography: Allen G. Siegler
- Production company: Screen Story Syndicate
- Distributed by: Big 4 Film Corporation
- Release date: January 15, 1930
- Running time: 64 minutes
- Country: United States
- Languages: Sound (Synchronized); English Intertitles

Take the Heir is a 1930 American synchronized comedy sound film directed by Lloyd Ingraham and starring Edward Everett Horton, Dorothy Devore and Edythe Chapman. While the film has no audible dialog, it was released with a synchronized musical score with sound effects and featured a theme song that was sung by an uncredited tenor. The film was produced during the transition to sound film and a separate silent version was also released. Location shooting took place around Broadway. A review in the Motion Picture News considered the film "very, very weak" and a waste of Everett Horton's talents.

== Plot ==
An English aristocrat Lord Tweedham inherits property in the United States. However, when he arrives he is in such a drunken state that his valet Smithers is forced to impersonate him. At the house of the executor Smithers falls in love with Susan the maid while being pursued by his daughter Muriel under the impression that he is Tweedham.

== Cast ==
- Edward Everett Horton as Smithers
- Dorothy Devore as Susan
- Frank Elliott as Lord Tweedham
- Edythe Chapman as Lady Tweedham
- Otis Harlan as John Walker
- Kay Deslys as Muriel Walker
- Margaret Campbell as Mrs. Smythe-Bellingham

== Music ==
The film features a theme song entitled "I Always Knew It Would Be You" with music by J.M. Coopersmith and lyrics by Cliff Hess.

== Bibliography ==
- Pitts, Michael R. Poverty Row Studios, 1929–1940. McFarland & Company, 2005.
