= Bustin' Thru =

1925 film

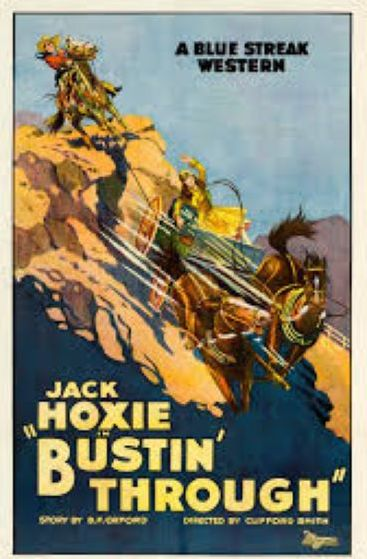
- Directed by: Clifford Smith
- Written by: Buckleigh Fritz Oxford
- Starring: Jack Hoxie; Helen Lynch; William Bailey
- Cinematography: William Nobles
- Production company: Universal Pictures
- Distributed by: Universal Pictures
- Release date: October 18, 1925
- Running time: 50 minutes
- Country: United States
- Languages: Silent; English intertitles

Bustin' Thru (also written as Bustin' Through) is a 1925 American silent Western film directed by Clifford Smith and starring Jack Hoxie, Helen Lynch and William Bailey.

== Synopsis ==
Jack Savage refuses to sell his ranch to millionaire John Merritt who has previously shown no interest in ranching. It becomes clear that he believes that there is gold beneath the property, and his lawyer manages to acquire it through a technicality. However, Jack has fallen in love Merritt's daughter Helen, and after marrying her he reclaims his ranch.

== Cast ==
- Jack Hoxie as Jack Savage
- Helen Lynch as Helen Merritt
- William Bailey as Harvey Gregg
- Alfred Allen as John Merritt
- George Grandee as Rudolph Romano

== Preservation ==
With no holdings located in archives, Bustin' Thru is considered a lost film.

== Bibliography ==
- Connelly, Robert B. The Silents: Silent Feature Films, 1910-36, Volume 40, Issue 2. December Press, 1998.
- Munden, Kenneth White. The American Film Institute Catalog of Motion Pictures Produced in the United States, Part 1. University of California Press, 1997.
