= Shattered Dreams (1922 film) =

1922 film

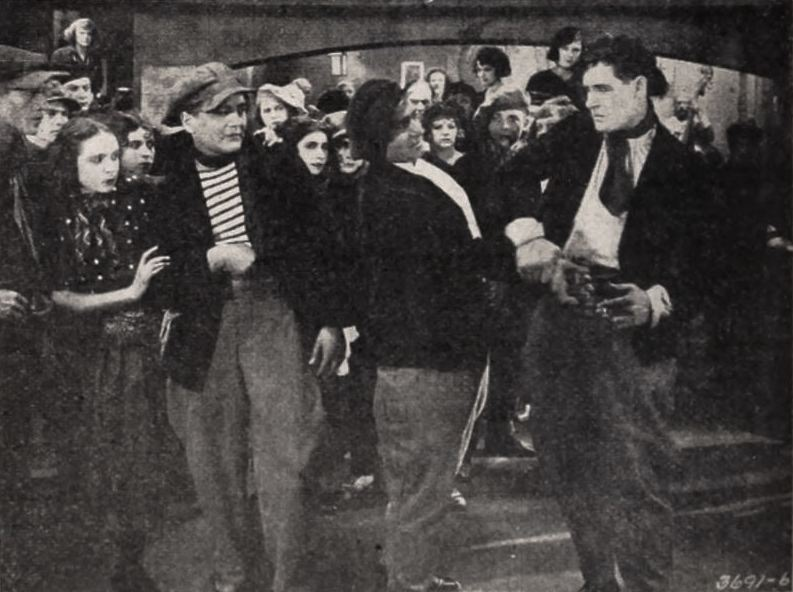
- Directed by: Paul Scardon
- Written by: J. Grubb Alexander
- Based on: Wind Along the Waste by Maude Annesley
- Produced by: Carl Laemmle
- Starring: Miss DuPont; Bertram Grassby; Herbert Heyes
- Cinematography: Ben F. Reynolds
- Production company: Universal Pictures
- Distributed by: Universal Pictures
- Release date: January 2, 1922
- Running time: 50 minutes
- Country: United States
- Languages: Silent; English intertitles

Shattered Dreams is a 1922 American silent drama film directed by Paul Scardon and starring Miss DuPont, Bertram Grassby and Herbert Heyes.

== Cast ==
- Miss DuPont as Marie Moselle
- Bertram Grassby as Théophine Grusant
- Herbert Heyes as Louis du Bois
- Eric Mayne as The Police Commissioner

== Bibliography ==
- Munden, Kenneth White. The American Film Institute Catalog of Motion Pictures Produced in the United States, Part 1. University of California Press, 1997.
