= The Midnight Flyer (1925 film) =

Silent film from 1925 about a runaway train.

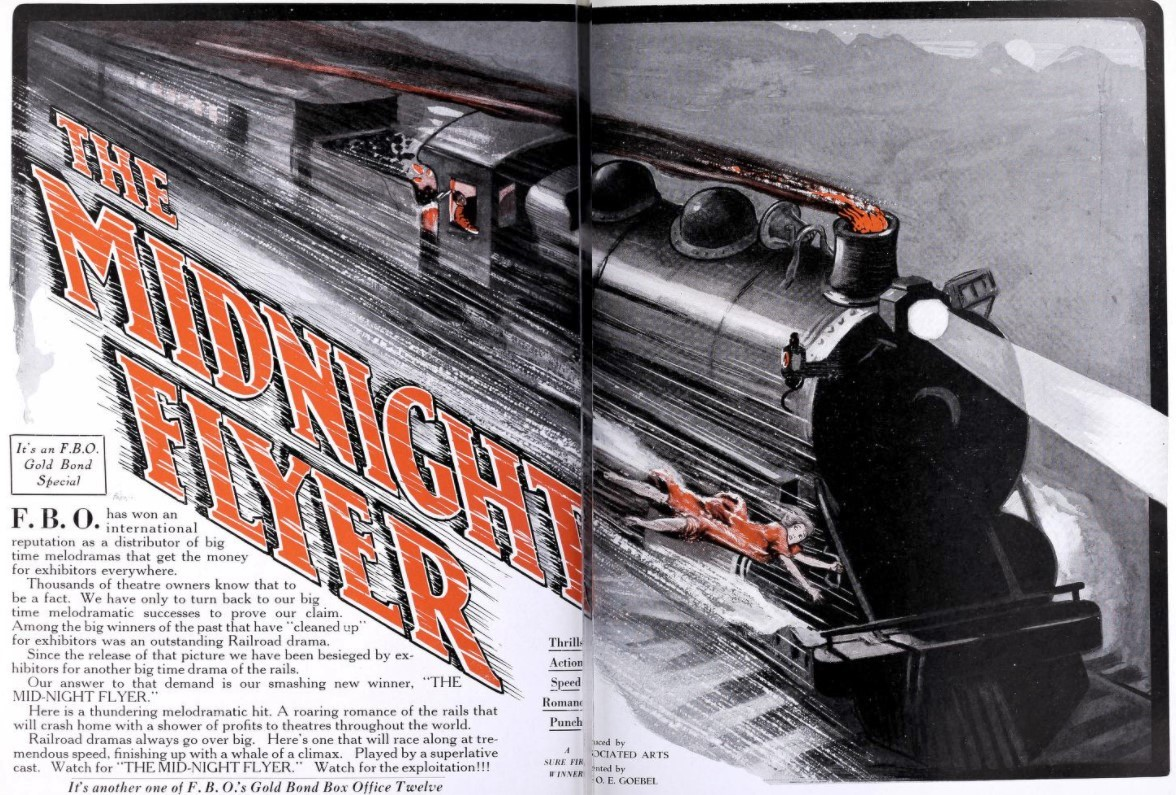
- Directed by: Tom Forman
- Story by: Arthur Guy Empey
- Starring: Cullen Landis, Dorothy Devore
- Production company: R-C Pictures
- Distributed by: Film Booking Offices of America
- Release date: December 6, 1925 (United States)
- Running time: 6,200 ft
- Country: United States
- Language: silent with English intertitles

The Midnight Flyer is a 1925 American silent action film directed by Tom Forman, and starring Cullen Landis and Dorothy Devore. It was advertised as being seven reels long.

== Synopsis ==
Plot synopsis provided by Motion Picture News

David Henderson, an engineer, is let go from his job because he deserts his engine when menaced by Mel Slater, a drunken fireman.

Slater also loses his job, driving him to steal the titular Midnight Flyer train. Slater throws the engineer off, and the Midnight Flyer becomes a runaway train. Henderson uses a freight train to catch up to the Midnight Flyer. Henderson boards the runaway train and over powers Slater in a fight.

For Henderson's heroism, he gets his job back and wins the heart of Mary Baxter, the girl he loves.

== Cast ==
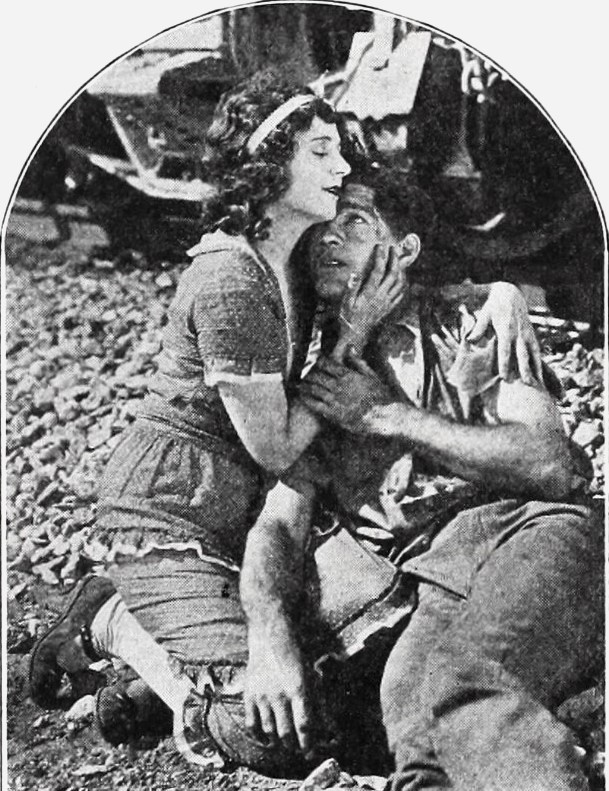
Mary (Devore) embraces David (Landis)

- Cullen Landis as David Henderson
- Dorothy Devore as Mary Baxter
- Charles Post as Mel Slater
- Charles Hill Mailes as Silas Henderson
- Frankie Darro as Young Davey
- Claire McDowell as Liza Slater
- Barbara Tennant as Mother Henderson

== Reception ==
George T. Pardy reviewed the film for Motion Picture News, calling it "as spectacular a railroad melodrama as has ever been filmed." Pardy praised the fast pace and action.

In Exhibitor's Herald, theater owner Lloyd Oller wrote that the film was a success in his home town of Tamms, IL.
