= Maude Annesley =

British novelist (1871-1930)

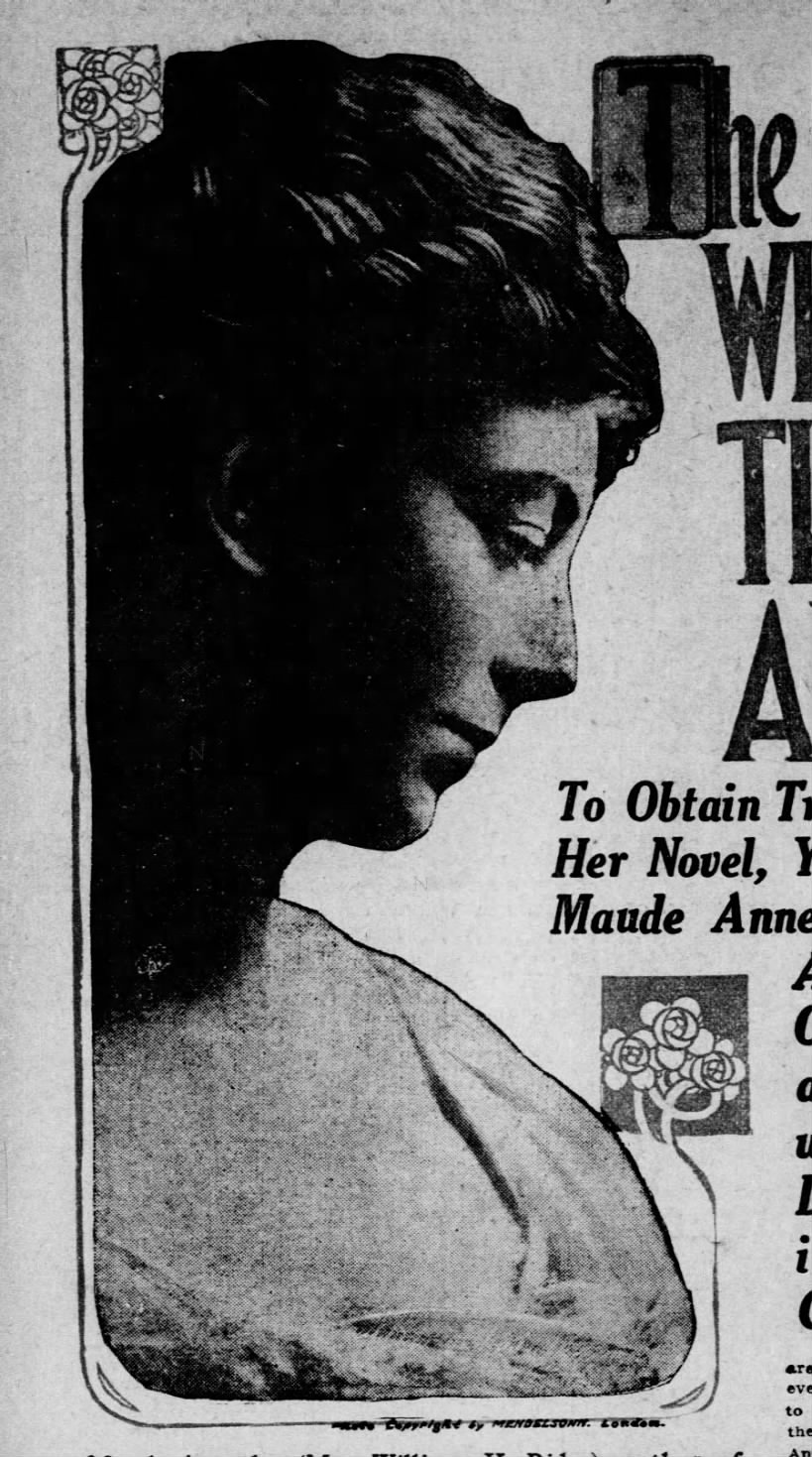
- Born: 11 January 1871; Newcastle-under-Lyme
- Died: 6 November 1930 (aged 59)
- Spouse(s): Henry Alexander Hadden, William Henry Rider, Harry Blaikie Brownlow

Maude Gertrude Annesley Webster-Wedderburn Hadden Rider Brownlow (11 January 1871 – 6 November 1930) was a British novelist who published under the name Maude Annesley.

She was born Maude Gertrude Annesley Webster-Wedderburn on 11 January 1871 in Newcastle-under-Lyme, the daughter of Major George Gordon Trophime-Gérard de Lally-Tollendal Webster-Wedderburn, son of James Webster-Wedderburn, and Caroline Teresa Dixon.

She married Henry Alexander Hadden, a solicitor, in 1892. Still married to Hadden, Annesley moved to Paris with William Henry Rider, a publisher, in 1902. The ensuing divorce was a public scandal.

Annesley was a contributor to The Fortnightly Review, The Westminster Gazette, and other publications. She published a number of novels mainly featuring, in the words of Sandra Kemp, "restless daughters and wives." Some of them featured supernatural elements, like the clairvoyant protagonist of The Door of Darkness (1909) or the sinister hypnotist of Shadow-Shapes (1911). Two of her novels were adapted for film: Wind Along the Waste (1910) as Shattered Dreams (1922) and The Wine of Life (1907) as the 1924 film of the same name.

According to her great-grandson John Stewart, Rider introduced Annesley to "the world of the occult, the Golden Dawn, Swinburne, MacGregor Mather, drugs and orgies," which eventually took their toll on her. Her third husband had her institutionalized at Camberwell House Lunatic Asylum in Peckham.

Maude Annesley died on 6 November 1930.

== Personal life ==
Maude Annesley was married three times:

- Henry Alexander Hadden, in 1892. They had a daughter, Betty Valentia Hadden Stewart (1893-1978)
- William Henry Rider, in 1902.
- Major Harry Blaikie Brownlow, in 1915.

== Bibliography ==
- The Wine of Life (1907)
- The Door of Darkness (1909)
- This Day's Madness (1909)
- Wind Along the Waste (1910)
- All Awry (1911)
- Shadow-Shapes (1911)
- Nights and Days (1912)
- The Sphinx in the Labyrinth (1913)
- My Parisian Year: A Woman's Point of View (1914)
- Blind Understanding (1915)
- The Player (1922)
- Where I Made One (1923)
