= When Odds Are Even =

1923 film

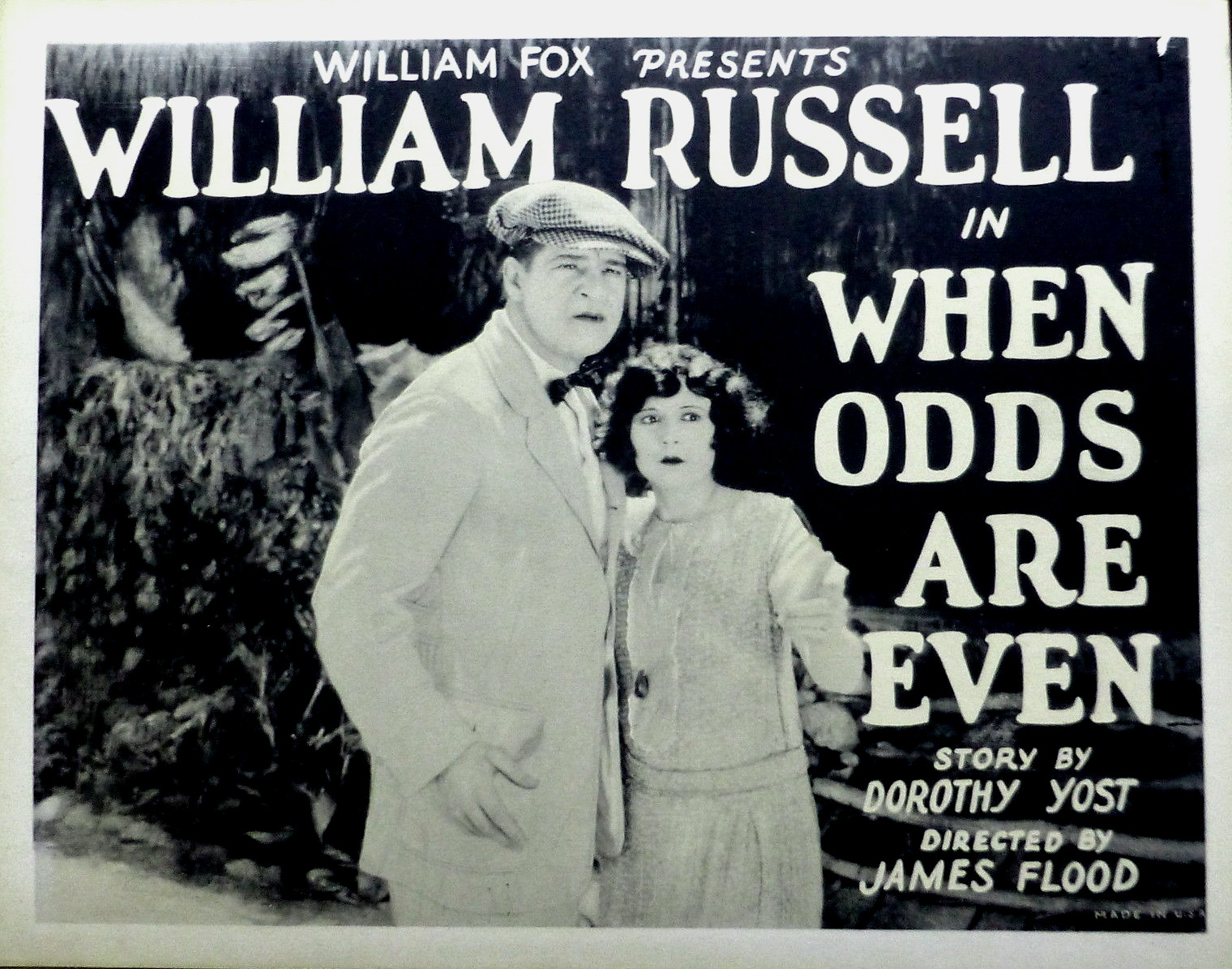
- Lobby card
- Directed by: James Flood
- Written by: Dorothy Yost
- Produced by: William Fox
- Starring: William Russell; Dorothy Devore; Lloyd Whitlock
- Cinematography: Joseph Brotherton
- Production company: Fox Film
- Distributed by: Fox Film
- Release date: November 25, 1923
- Running time: 5 reels
- Country: United States
- Language: Silent (English intertitles)

When Odds Are Even is a lost 1923 American silent drama film directed by James Flood and starring William Russell, Dorothy Devore, and Lloyd Whitlock.

== Cast ==
- William Russell as Jack Arnold
- Dorothy Devore as Caroline Peyton
- Lloyd Whitlock as Neal Travis
- Frank Beal as Clive Langdon
- Allan Cavan as British Consul

== Preservation ==
With no holdings located in archives, When Odds Are Even is considered a lost film. A trailer for the film is held by George Eastman House.

== Bibliography ==
- Solomon, Aubrey. The Fox Film Corporation, 1915-1935: A History and Filmography. McFarland, 2011.
