= The First Night (film) =

1927 film

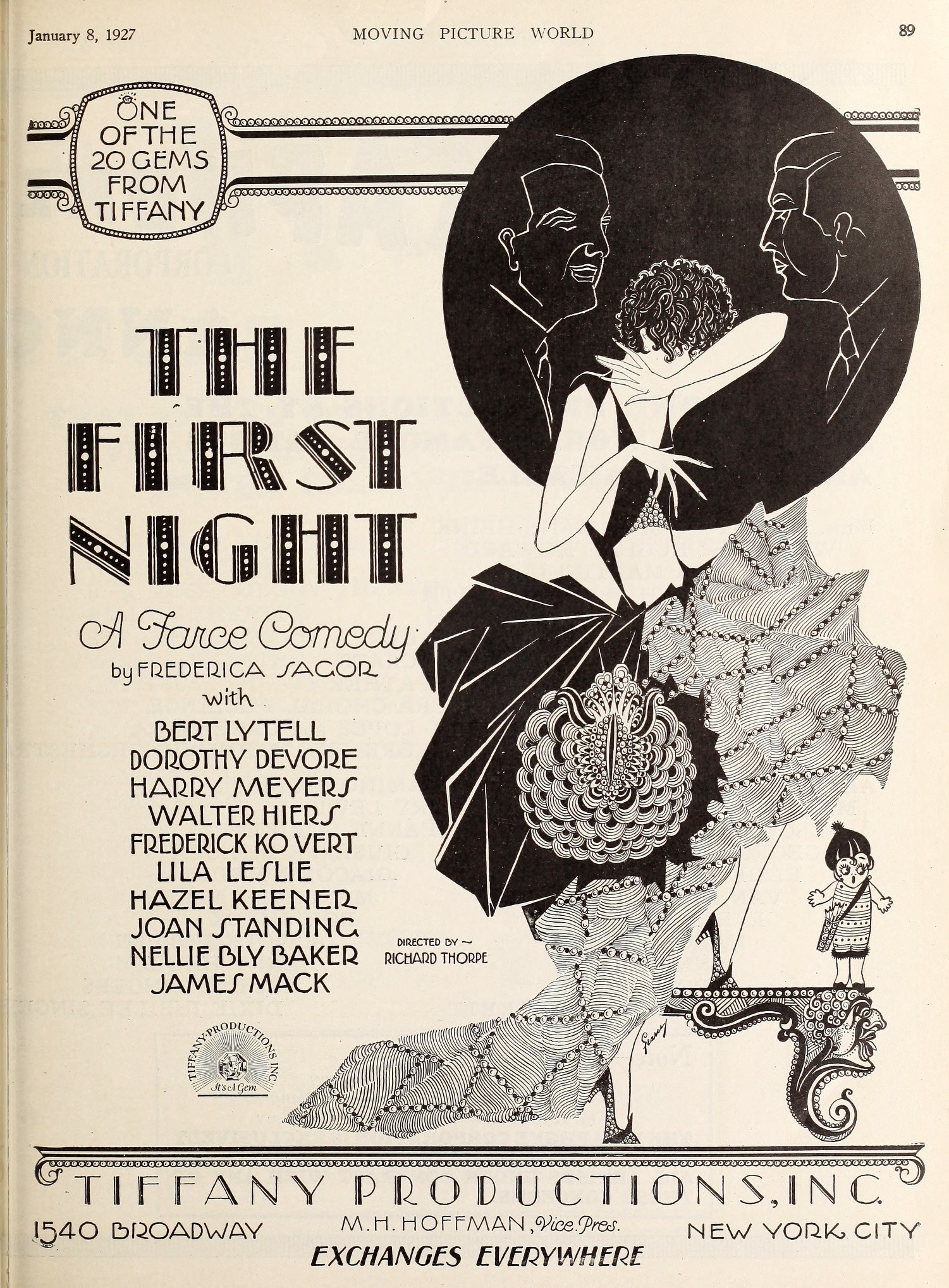
- Directed by: Richard Thorpe
- Written by: Frederica Sagor Maas; Esther Shulkin
- Starring: Bert Lytell; Dorothy Devore; Harry Myers
- Cinematography: Milton Moore; Mack Stengler
- Edited by: James C. McKay
- Production company: Tiffany Pictures
- Distributed by: Tiffany Pictures
- Release date: January 1, 1927
- Running time: 60 minutes
- Country: United States
- Language: Silent (English intertitles)

The First Night is a 1927 American silent comedy film directed by Richard Thorpe and starring Bert Lytell, Dorothy Devore, and Harry Myers. It was produced and distributed by the independent Tiffany Pictures. The film's sets were designed by the art director Edwin B. Willis.

== Synopsis ==
When a couple announces an engagement, they are both confronted by former associates who claim that they are either married or engaged already. They decide to elope, but things do not go entirely to plan.

== Cast ==
- Bert Lytell as Dr. Richard Bard
- Dorothy Devore as Doris Frazer
- Harry Myers as Hotel Detective
- Frederick Ko Vert as Mimi / Jack White
- Walter Hiers as Mr. Cleveland
- Lila Leslie as Mrs. Cleveland
- James T. Mack as The Drunk
- Hazel Keener as Miss Leeds
- Joan Standing as Mrs. Miller

== Bibliography ==
- Munden, Kenneth White. The American Film Institute Catalog of Motion Pictures Produced in the United States, Part 1. University of California Press, 1997.
