= Know Thy Wife =

- Directed by: Al Christie
- Story by: Walter Graham
- Produced by: Al Christie
- Starring: Dorothy Devore
- Cinematography: Anton Nagy
- Release date: December 30, 1918
- Running time: 13 minutes
- Country: United States
- Language: Silent film..(English intertitles)

Know Thy Wife is a surviving 1918 silent comedy short film starring Dorothy Devore and produced by Al Christie.

== Cast ==
- Dorothy Devore - Betty Browning (*billed Dorothy De Vore)
- Leota Lorraine - Lillian
- Earle Rodney - Bob Browning
