= The Escape (1926 film) =

1926 film

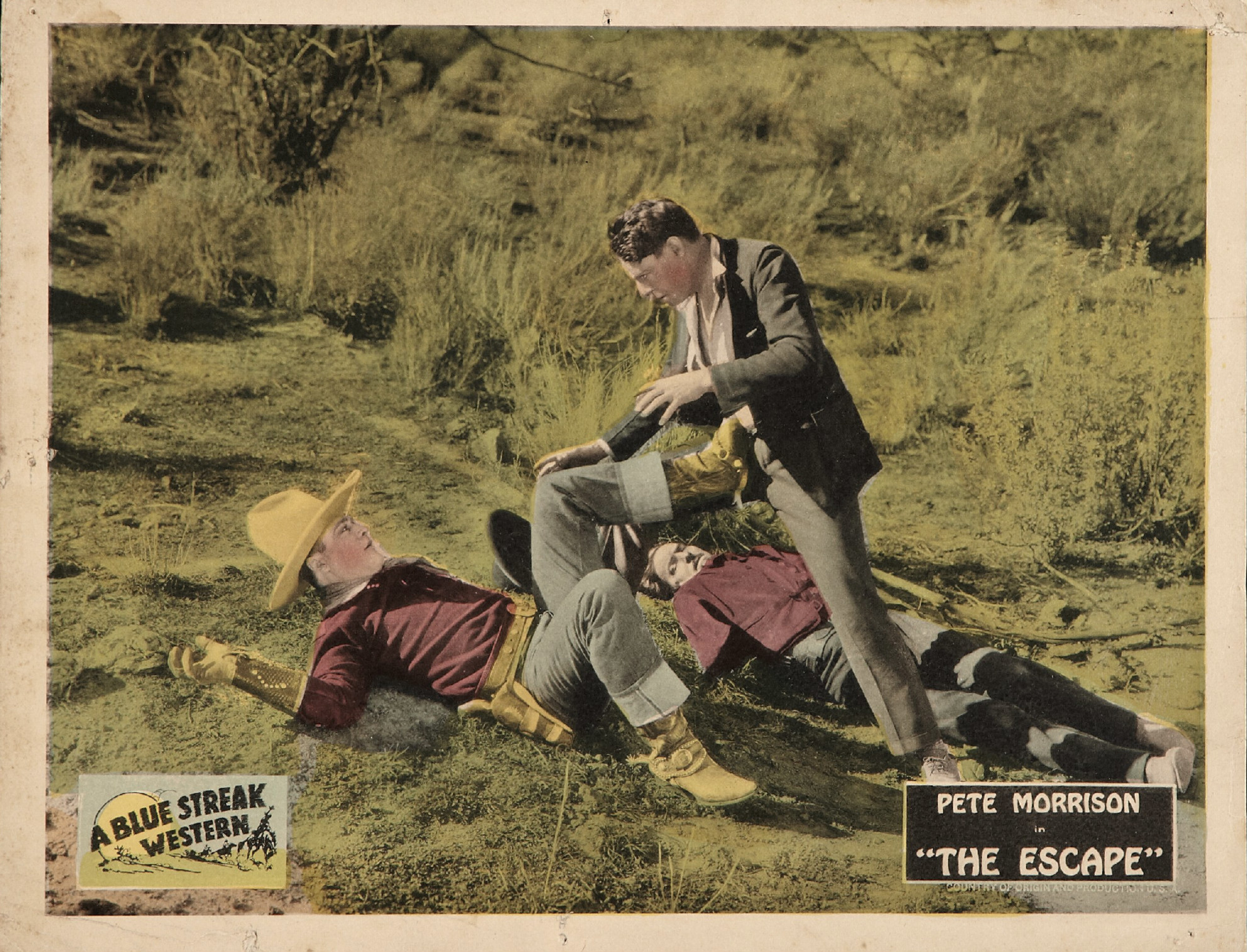
- Lobby card
- Directed by: Milburn Morante
- Written by: L. V. Jefferson; Frank S. Beresford
- Produced by: Carl Laemmle
- Starring: Pete Morrison; Barbara Starr; Frank Norcross
- Cinematography: Jack Young
- Production company: Universal Pictures
- Distributed by: Universal Pictures
- Release date: June 6, 1926
- Running time: 5 reels
- Country: United States
- Language: Silent (English intertitles)

The Escape is a 1926 American silent Western film directed by Milburn Morante and starring Pete Morrison, Barbara Starr, and Frank Norcross.

== Plot ==
As described in a film magazine review, Johnny Bowers and Howard Breen are rival suitors for Evelyn Grant, daughter of the town's bank owner. Breen is also secretly head of a bandit gang and plans a robbery of the stagecoach while it is bringing money to the bank. Johnny and his men are jailed on a false charge, but they escape, halt the stage, and preemptively take the money to the bank. The gang then holds up the bank and is pursued by a posse. Breen is killed. Johnny and Evelyn become a couple.

== Cast ==
- Pete Morrison as Johnny Bowers
- Barbara Starr as Evelyn Grant
- Frank Norcross as Jeremiah Grant
- Bruce Gordon as Howard Breen
- Elmer Dewey as Silas Peele
- Jane Arden as Flossie Lane
- Tex Young as Manuel Estrada

== Preservation ==
With no holdings located in archives, The Escape is considered a lost film.
