= Senor Daredevil =

1926 film directed by Albert S. Rogell

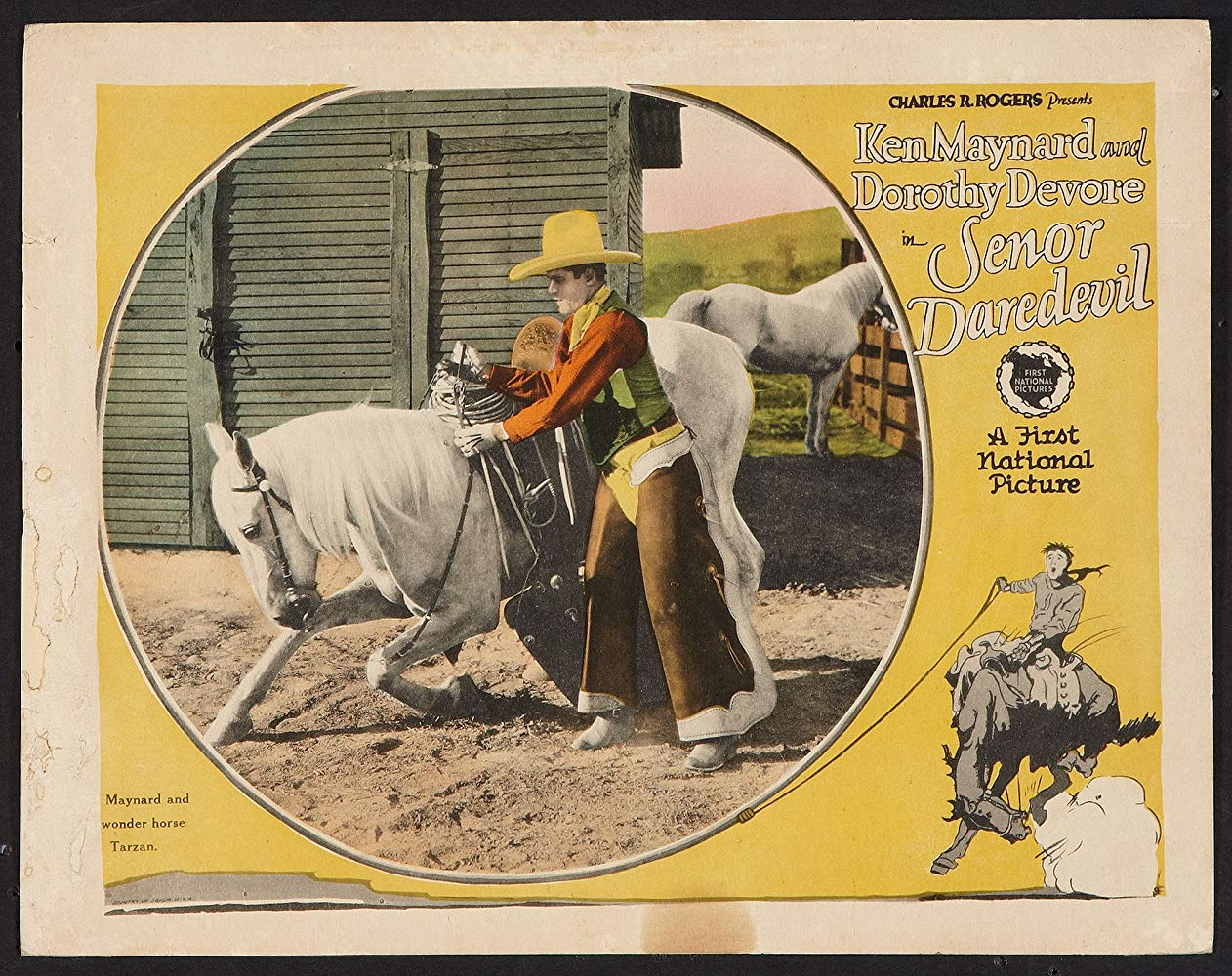
- Lobby card
- Directed by: Albert S. Rogell
- Written by: Marion Jackson
- Produced by: Charles R. Rogers
- Starring: Ken Maynard; Dorothy Devore; George Nichols
- Cinematography: Sol Polito
- Production company: Charles R. Rogers Productions
- Distributed by: First National Pictures
- Release date: August 1, 1926
- Running time: 70 minutes/ref
- Country: United States
- Language: Silent (English intertitles)

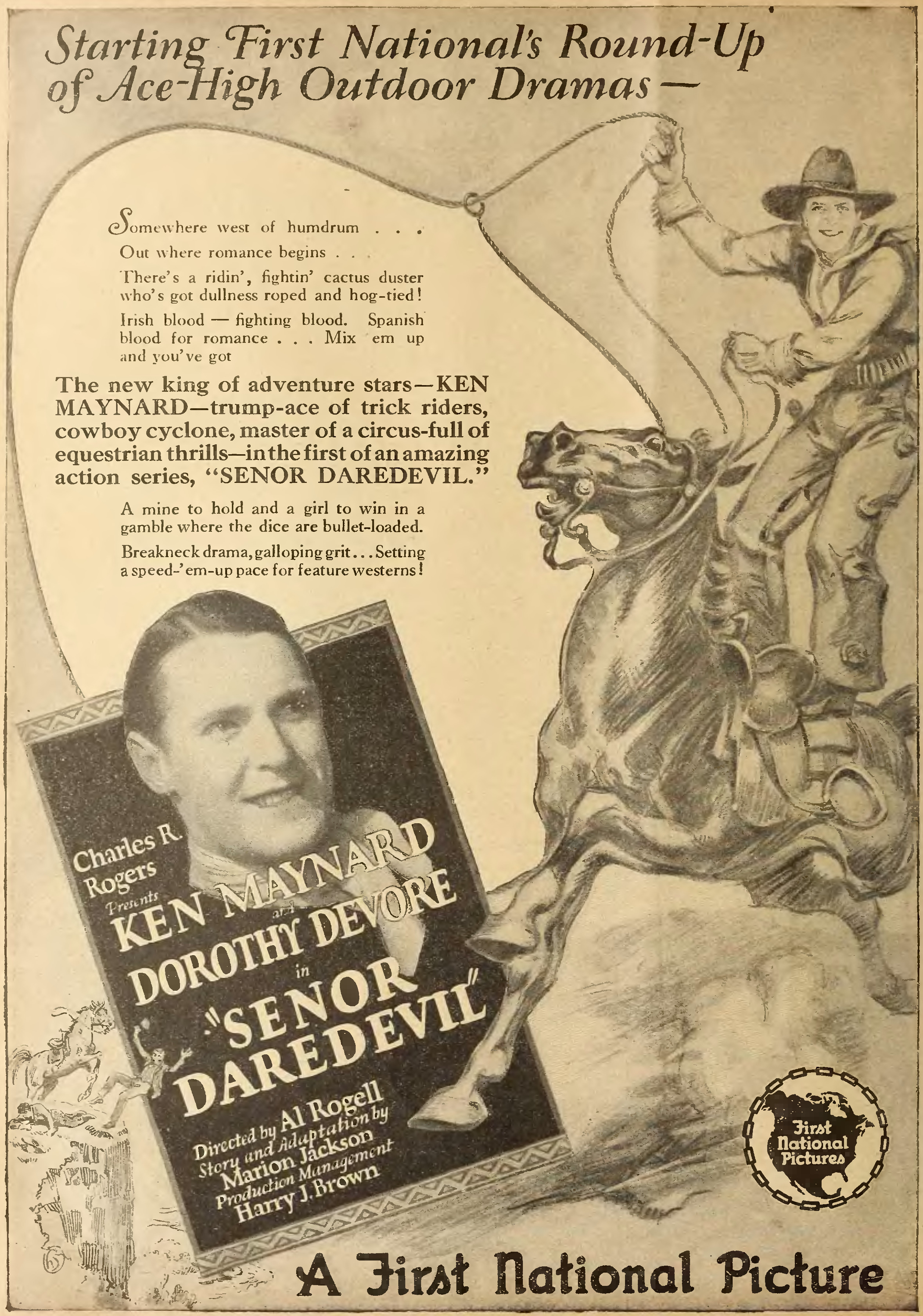
Senor Daredevil ad from Picture-Play Magazine, 1926

Senor Daredevil is a 1926 American silent Western film directed by Albert S. Rogell and starring Ken Maynard, Dorothy Devore, and George Nichols.

== Cast ==
- Ken Maynard as Don Luis O'Flaherty
- Dorothy Devore as Sally Blake
- George Nichols as 'Tiger' O'Flagherty
- Josef Swickard as Juan Estrada
- J.P. McGowan as Jesse Wilks
- Sheldon Lewis as Ratburn
- Buck Black as Pat Muldoon
- Billy Franey as The Cook

== Preservation ==
With no prints of Senor Daredevil located in any film archives, it is a lost film.

== Bibliography ==
- Munden, Kenneth White. The American Film Institute Catalog of Motion Pictures Produced in the United States, Part 1. University of California Press, 1997. ISBN 9780520209701
