= Ernest Van Pelt =

American actor

- Born: March 31, 1883; Kansas, US
- Died: July 1, 1961 (aged 78); Los Angeles, California, US
- Occupation: Actor
- Years active: 1915–1935
- Spouse: Ella

Ernest Van Pelt (March 31, 1883 – July 1, 1961) was an American actor. He often starred in Charlie Chaplin films.

== Life ==
Ernest Van Pelt was born on 31 March 1883 in Kansas. He died on July 1, 1961, in Los Angeles, California.

== Partial filmography ==
- The Tramp (1915)
- The Champion (1915)
- In the Park (1915)
- By the Sea (1915)
- A Jitney Elopement (1915)
- Montana Bill (1921) (actor and assistant director)
- Bring Him In (1921) (actor)
- The Cloud Rider (1925) (supervising producer)
- Avenging Fangs (1927) (director)
- Annapolis Farewell (1935)
- I Live for Love (1935) (stage director)
- Two Sinners (1935)
