= The Golden Gallows =

1922 film by Paul Scardon

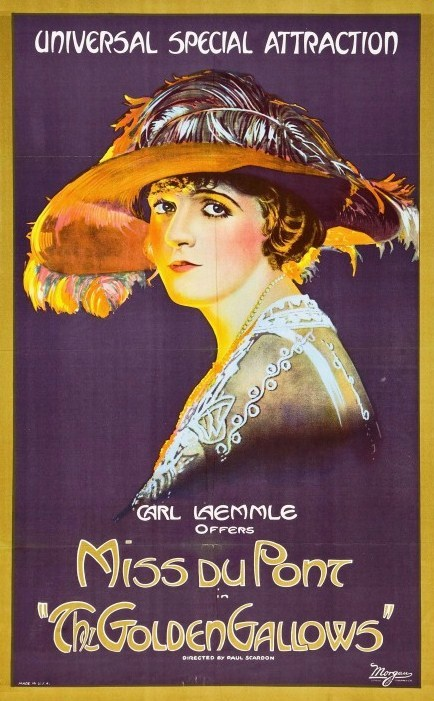
- Poster
- Directed by: Paul Scardon
- Written by: Harvey Gates
- Produced by: Carl Laemmle
- Starring: Miss DuPont
- Cinematography: Ben F. Reynolds
- Distributed by: Universal Film Manufacturing Company
- Release date: February 22, 1922
- Running time: 5 reels; 4808 feet
- Country: United States
- Language: Silent (English intertitles)

The Golden Gallows is a 1922 American silent drama film directed by Paul Scardon and starring Miss DuPont. It was produced and distributed by the Universal Film Manufacturing Company. It is not known whether the film currently survives.

== Plot ==
As described in a film magazine, actress Willow Winters (DuPont) rises to fame when opportunity comes by accident to her. She is courted by two men, notorious man-about-town Leander Sills (Stevens) and Peter Galliner (Mower), the son of an aristocratic family. Sills is shot by a former sweetheart and his will lists Willow as his beneficiary. This bequest is misconstrued by Peter who renounces her, believing that sinister relations had prompted Leander's action. Sills' attorney has a letter that reveals the truth of the situation, but he withholds it in an endeavor to win the affections of Willow. During Peter's absence, Willow cultivates the acquaintance of his mother (Hancock) and wins her favor. During a reception at the Galliner home, Willow learns of the letter held by the attorney, and promises to come to the attorney's office for it. Peter returns and goes to the attorney's office where he finds Willow holding the attorney at bay with a revolver. The letter reveals the true feelings existing between Leander and Willow and Peter is convinced of her innocence.

== Cast ==
- Miss DuPont as Willow Winters
- Edwin Stevens as Leander Sills
- Eve Southern as Cleo Twayne
- Jack Mower as Peter Galliner
- George B. Williams as Mark Buckheim
- Douglas Gerrard as Alexander Riche
- Elinor Hancock as Mrs. Galliner
- Barbara Tennant as Flo
