= Sammy Blum =

American actor (1889–1945)

- Born: May 25, 1889; New York City, New York, United States
- Died: June 1, 1945 (aged 56); Hollywood, California, United States
- Occupation: Actor
- Years active: 1918–1945

Sammy Blum (May 25, 1889 – June 1, 1945) was an American character actor whose career spanned both the silent and talking film eras. Born in New York City, over the almost 30 years he was in the film industry, he would appear in almost 50 films, mostly in small or bit parts. He continued working right up until his death, his final appearance being in 1946's Deadline at Dawn. He died on June 1, 1945, prior to the completion of filming, and the film was released the following March.

== Filmography ==
(Per AFI database)

- The Blue Bird (1918)
- Headin' Home (1920)
- Full Speed (1925)
- Galloping Jinx (1925)
- The Winning of Barbara Worth (1926)
- Black Paradise (1926)
- Siberia (1926)
- Smile, Brother, Smile (1927)
- The Wheel of Destiny (1927)
- The Delightful Rogue (1929)
- The Prince of Hearts (1929)
- Rio Rita (1929)
- The Grand Parade (1930)
- Party Girl (1930)
- Iron Man (1931)
- Night World (1932)
- Broadway Bill (1934)
- Jealousy (1934)
- Atlantic Adventure (1935)
- Party Wire (1935)
- Alias Mary Dow (1935)
- The Best Man Wins (1935)
- Rose of the Rancho (1936)
- Mr. Deeds Goes to Town (1936)
- The Devil's Playground (1937)
- When G-Men Step In (1938)
- Let Us Live (1939)
- Young Tom Edison (1940)
- The Great McGinty (1940)
- Bedtime Story (1941)
- The Monster and the Girl (1941)
- Whistling in Brooklyn (1943)
- Heavenly Days (1944)
- Girl Rush (1944)
- The Falcon in Hollywood (1944) - Sammy - Actors Agent (uncredited)
- The Master Race (1944)
- Nevada (1944)
- A Night of Adventure (1944)
- None But the Lonely Heart (1944)
- Step Lively (1944)
- Bride by Mistake (1944)
- Betrayal from the East (1945)
- The Brighton Strangler (1945)
- The Falcon in San Francisco (1945)
- George White's Scandals (1945)
- Mama Loves Papa (1945)
- Sing Your Way Home (1945)
- Wanderer of the Wasteland (1945)
- West of the Pecos (1945)
- What a Blonde (1945)
- Deadline at Dawn (1946)
