= Bring Him In =

1921 film

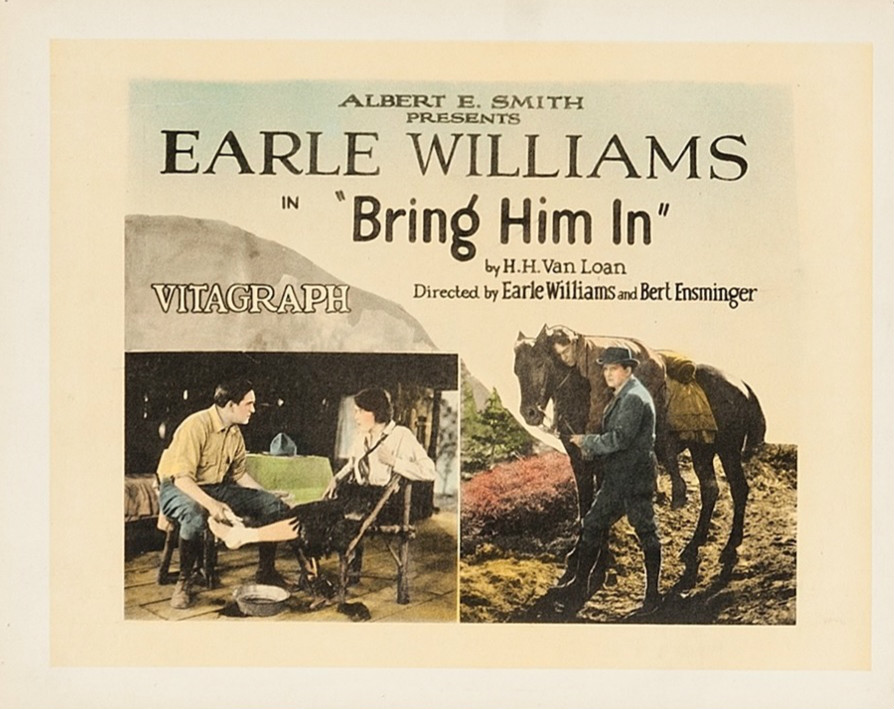
- Directed by: Robert Ensminger; Earle Williams
- Written by: Thomas Dixon Jr. H.H. Van Loan
- Starring: Earle Williams; Fritzi Ridgeway; Ernest Van Pelt
- Cinematography: Jack MacKenzie
- Production company: Vitagraph Company of America
- Distributed by: Vitagraph Company of America
- Release date: October 16, 1921
- Running time: 50 minutes
- Country: United States
- Languages: Silent; English intertitles

Bring Him In is a 1921 American silent drama film directed by Robert Ensminger and Earle Williams and starring Williams, Fritzi Ridgeway and Ernest Van Pelt.

== Cast ==
- Earle Williams as Dr. John Hood
- Fritzi Ridgeway as Mary Mackay
- Elmer Dewey as Baptiste
- Ernest Van Pelt as Canby
- Paul Weigel as Braganza
- Bruce Gordon as McKenna

== Production ==
Production began on Bring Him In in June 1921, under the working title of The Man from Calgary, and exteriors were shot at Lake Tahoe. Filming had wrapped up by mid-July.

== Bibliography ==
- Connelly, Robert B. The Silents: Silent Feature Films, 1910-36, Volume 40, Issue 2. December Press, 1998.
- Munden, Kenneth White. The American Film Institute Catalog of Motion Pictures Produced in the United States, Part 1. University of California Press, 1997.
