= Black Paradise =

1926 film

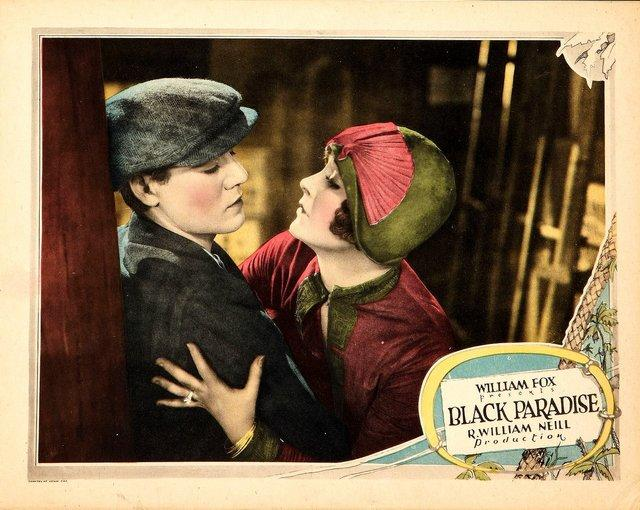
- Lobby card
- Directed by: Roy William Neill
- Written by: Gordon Rigby
- Produced by: William Fox
- Starring: Madge Bellamy; Leslie Fenton; Edmund Lowe
- Cinematography: George Schneiderman
- Production company: Fox Film
- Distributed by: Fox Film
- Release date: May 30, 1926
- Running time: 50 minutes
- Country: United States
- Language: Silent (English intertitles)

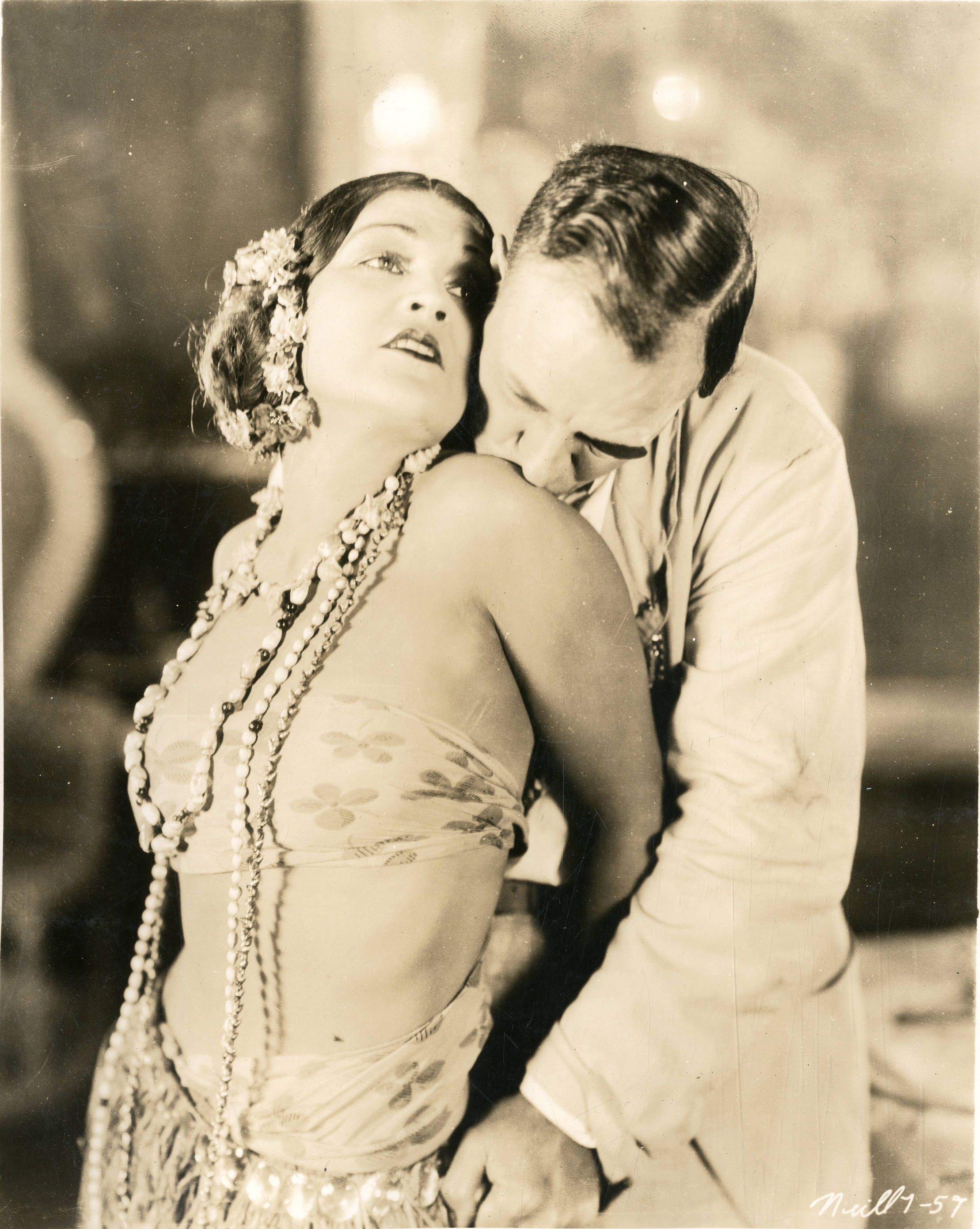
Black Paradise publicity still, 1926

Black Paradise is a 1926 American silent adventure film directed by Roy William Neill and starring Madge Bellamy, Leslie Fenton, and Edmund Lowe.

== Plot ==
In San Francisco, Sylvia Douglas and her fiancé, James Callahan, who has recently turned back to his criminal ways, flee the city after Jim steals a diamond necklace due to frustration with his job search. Detective Graham pursues them to a remote island in the South Pacific, where they encounter a gangster named Murdock. Callahan becomes enamored with a local woman named Leona, while Sylvia seeks refuge with Graham from Murdock's advances. As tensions rise, a volcanic eruption adds further complications to their predicament.

== Cast ==
- Madge Bellamy as Sylvia Douglas
- Leslie Fenton as James Callahan
- Edmund Lowe as Graham
- Marcella Daly as Leona
- Harvey Clark as Hazy
- Edward Peil Sr. as Murdock
- Doris Lloyd as Lillian Webster
- Patrick Kelly as Dr. Murphy
- Mary Gordon as Mrs. Murphy
- Sammy Blum as The Halfwit
- Paul Panzer as Ship Captain

== Bibliography ==
- Solomon, Aubrey. The Fox Film Corporation, 1915-1935: A History and Filmography. McFarland, 2011.
