= How Baxter Butted In =

1925 film

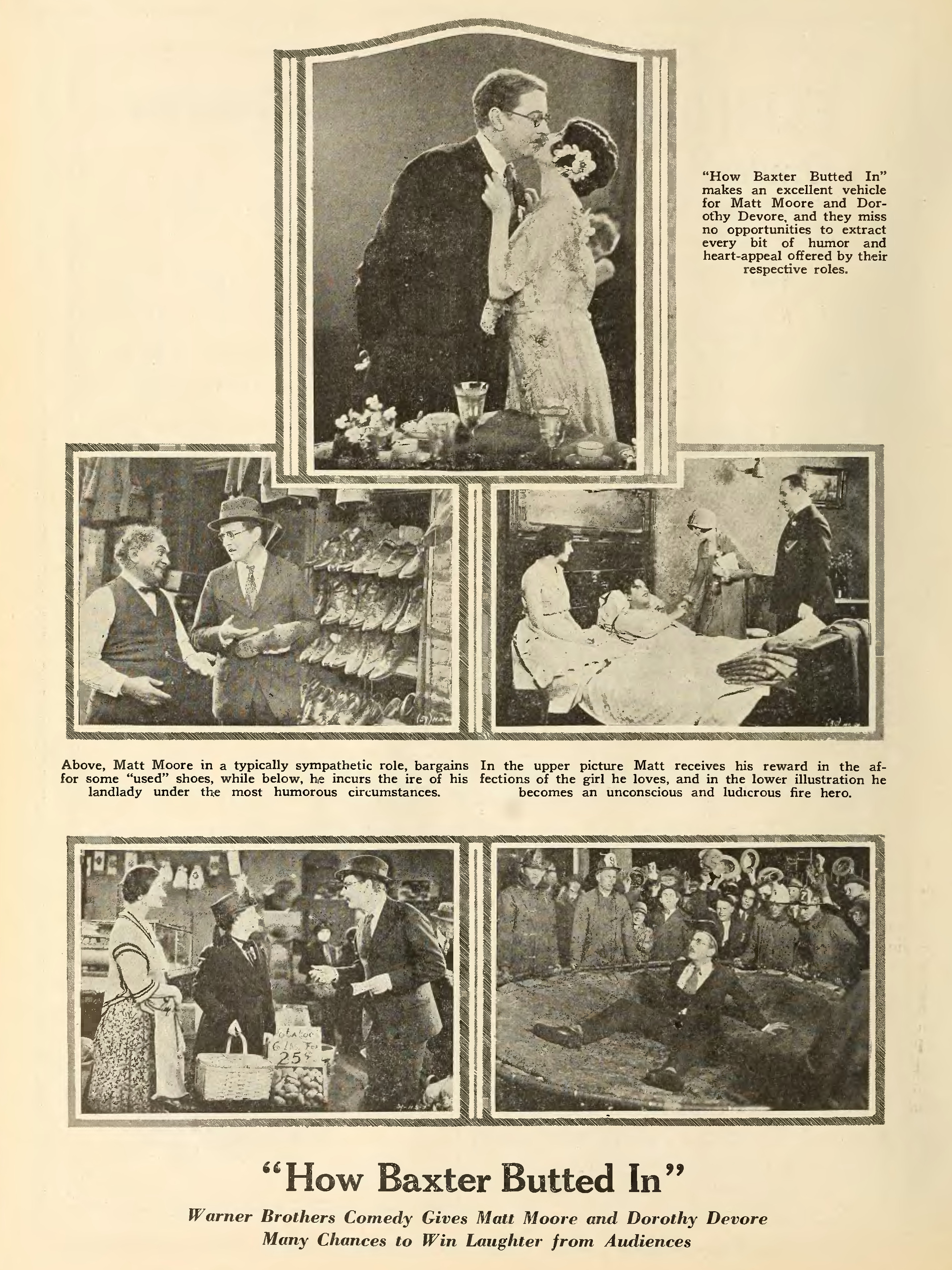
- Film advert
- Directed by: William Beaudine
- Written by: Owen Davis
- Starring: Dorothy Devore
- Cinematography: David Abel
- Production company: Warner Bros.
- Distributed by: Warner Bros.
- Release date: July 25, 1925
- Running time: 70 minutes
- Country: United States
- Language: Silent (English intertitles)

How Baxter Butted In is a 1925 American silent comedy film directed by William Beaudine.

== Plot ==
As described in a film magazine review, Henry Baxter is bashful and fails to get ahead in the world because people do not understand him. That is, all but Beulah Dyer, whom he loves blindly. His hard luck increases when a widowed sister-in-law and her two children descend upon his household. He works days at the office and nights doing clerical work for a druggist until his health fails him. Walter Higgins, his office boss, has stolen Henry's idea of boosting newspaper circulation by giving valor banquets to heroes. When Henry recovers from his illness, he is invited to one and finds that his struggles are appreciated as real heroism. When his home catches fire, and spurred on by the desire to be the other sort of hero, Henry thrusts aside the firemen and rescues the children himself.

== Cast ==
- Dorothy Devore as Beulah Dyer
- Matt Moore as Henry Baxter
- Ward Crane as Walter Higgins
- Wilfred Lucas as R.S. Falk
- Adda Gleason as Emmy Baxter
- Turner Savage as Jimmy Baxter
- Virginia Marshall as Mary Baxter
- Otis Harlan as Amos Nichols

== Preservation ==
With no prints of How Baxter Butted In located in any film archives, it is a lost film.
