= Helen Lynch =

American actress (1900–1965)

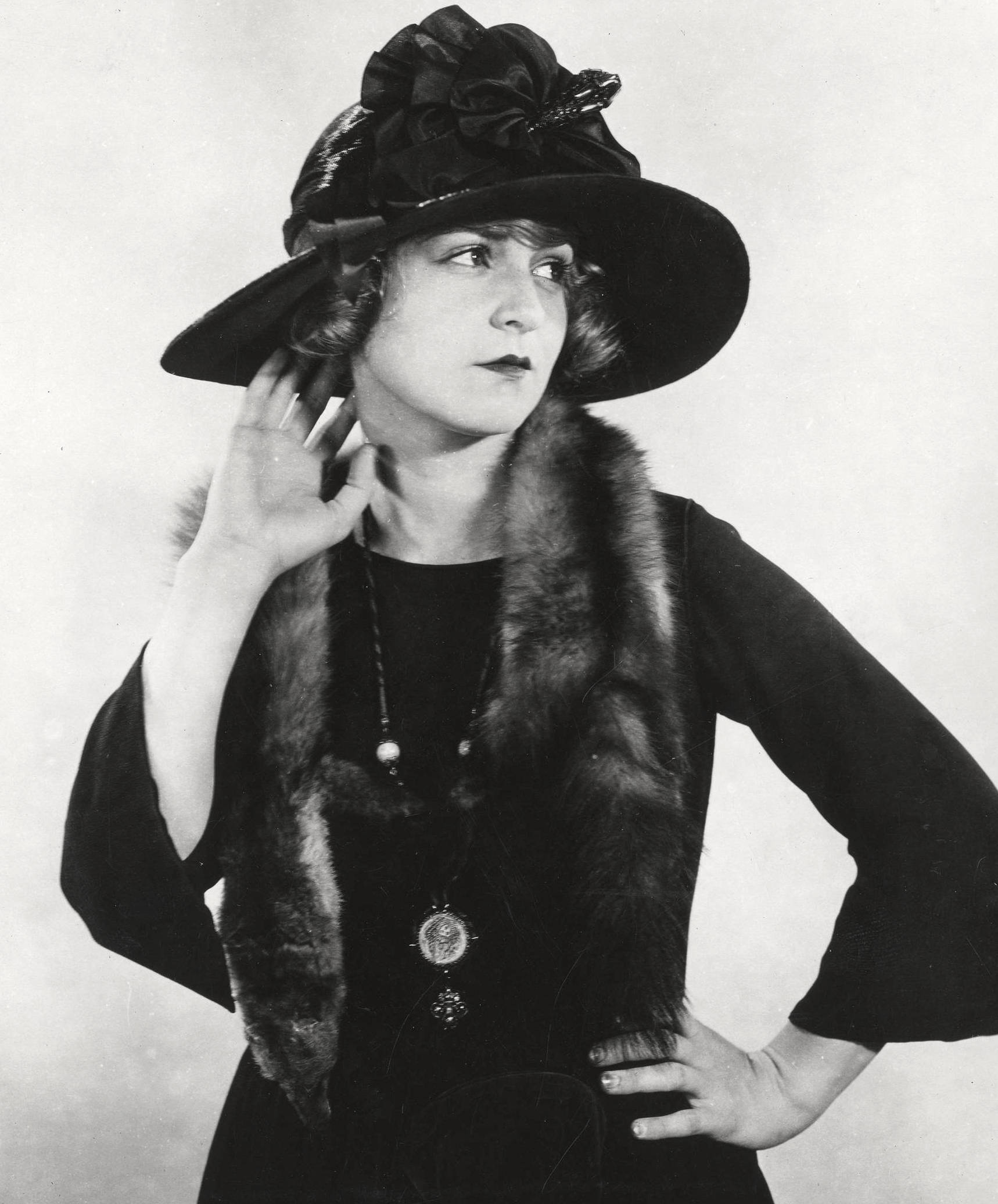
- Lynch in 1923
- Born: April 6, 1900; Billings, Montana, U.S.
- Died: March 2, 1965 (aged 64); Miami Beach, Florida, U.S.
- Occupation: Actress
- Spouse: Carroll Nye

Helen Lynch (April 6, 1900 – March 2, 1965) was an American silent film actress, mainly known for her roles playing gun molls and other morally dubious characters.

== Biography ==
Lynch was born on April 6, 1900 in Billings, Montana, where she was also raised. When she was one year old, her father died, and Lynch was raised along with her sister, Agnes, by their mother, Christian Fraser. When she was 9 years old, the family relocated to Hollywood, California, which at the time was a small suburb of Los Angeles situated amongst orchards.

After working as a film extra, Lynch was chosen as one of thirteen WAMPAS Baby Stars in 1923. During her career, she was mostly cast in comedies, and often portrayed gun molls and other controversial female characters.

She died in Miami Beach, Florida on March 2, 1965, at the age of 64.

== Filmography ==
- Honor Bound (1920)
- The House That Jazz Built (1921)
- What's a Wife Worth? (1921)
- My Lady Friends (1921)
- Live and Let Live (1921)
- Midnight (1922)
- Minnie (1922)
- Fools First (1922)
- The Other Side (1922)
- Glass Houses (1922)
- The Eternal Three (1923)
- Cause for Divorce (1923)
- The Dangerous Age (1923)
- The Meanest Man in the World (1923)
- The Tomboy (1924)
- The Valley of Hate (1924)
- American Manners (1924)
- On Probation (1924)
- Oh Doctor! (1925)
- Three Weeks in Paris (1925)
- Smilin' at Trouble (1925)
- Bustin' Thru (1925)
- After Marriage (1925)
- Smouldering Fires (1925)
- Fifth Avenue Models (1925)
- Three Weeks in Paris (1925)
- Return of Grey Wolf (1926)
- My Own Pal (1926)
- The Arizona Sweepstakes (1926)
- Speeding Through (1926)
- Tom and His Pals (1926)
- General Custer at the Little Big Horn (1927)
- Underworld (1927)
- Avenging Fangs (1927)
- Cheaters (1927)
- Husbands for Rent (1927)
- Love and Learn (1928)
- The Showdown (1928)
- The Singing Fool (1928)
- In Old Arizona (1928)
- Ladies of the Mob (1928)
- Thundergod (1928)
- Romance of the Underworld (1928)
- Stolen Love (1928)
- Speakeasy (1929)
- Why Bring That Up? (1929)
- City Girl (1930)
- Emergency Call (1933)
- Elmer and Elsie (1934)
- Hell-Ship Morgan (1936)
- Women Without Names (1940)
