= The Wrong Mr. Wright =

1927 film

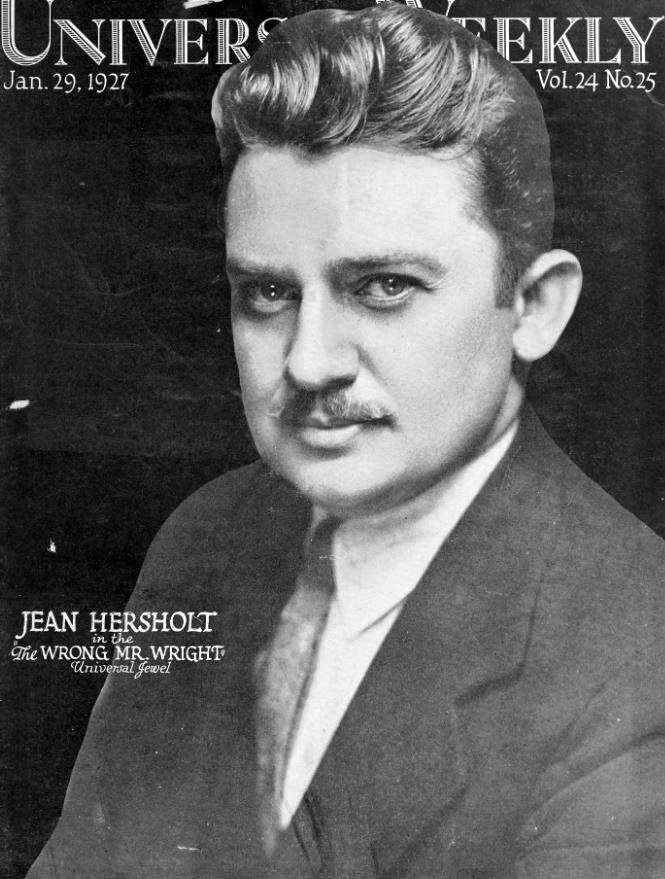
- Hersholt on magazine cover
- Directed by: Scott Sidney
- Screenplay by: Harold Shumate; James Madison
- Based on: The Wrong Mr. Wright by George Broadhurst
- Starring: Jean Hersholt; Enid Bennett; Dorothy Devore; Edgar Kennedy; Walter Hiers; Robert Anderson
- Cinematography: George Robinson
- Production company: Universal Pictures
- Distributed by: Universal Pictures
- Release date: February 27, 1927
- Running time: 70 minutes
- Country: United States
- Language: Silent (English intertitles)

The Wrong Mr. Wright is a 1927 American silent comedy film directed by Scott Sidney and written by Harold Shumate and James Madison. It is based on the 1897 play The Wrong Mr. Wright by George Broadhurst. The film stars Jean Hersholt, Enid Bennett, Dorothy Devore, Edgar Kennedy, Walter Hiers, and Robert Anderson. The film was released on February 27, 1927, by Universal Pictures.

== Plot ==
As described in a film magazine, Seymour White is vice-president of the White Corset company, a concern dying a slow but sure death because of the old-fashioned methods adhered to by Seymour's father, J. Silas White, who refuses to listen to advice from wellmeaning employees. They urge him to manufacture corsets and lingerie that will appeal to women of the present day. Seymour, a middle-aged man, has never married because of a childhood sweetheart who jilted him fifteen years before. Seymour receives a letter from his long-lost sweetheart and departs for Atlantic City to see her on the same day that Fred Bond, sales manager of the company, John Wright, cashier, and Wright's daughter, Teddy, conspire to take $10,000 allotted by White for advertising purposes and manufacture twentieth century lingerie which they show at the fashion review in Atlantic City. Upon discovering the disappearance of his cashier and the $10,000, Silas employs a private detective and his assistant, who see Seymour scrutinizing a corset advertisement. They decide he might be the missing Mr. Wright and follow him to Atlantic City. Seymour catches sight of his erstwhile sweetheart before she sees him and his love for her immediately cools, as she has grown very fat and has three children tugging at her dress. When she faintly recognizes Seymour, he denies that he is White and, seizing upon the first name he can think of, takes the name of Wright. When he registers as Wright, the detectives are sure they have their man, but the girl asks for more time in order to wring a confession out of Seymour.

When she makes herself attractive to Seymour, he falls desperately in love with her and, forgetting his years of scrimping and saving, dresses in the height of fashion. In the meantime the real Mr. Wright and his daughter enter their new designs in the fashion show and take it by storm, assuring a wave of prosperity for the White Corset Company. The girl detective, instead of wheedling a confession out of Seymour, falls in love with him herself, much to the disgust of her employer.

Seymour gets out of his engagement with the childhood sweetheart by disguising himself as a seedy oaf. Seeing her first love looking like a tramp, she breaks her agreement before witnesses, to Seymour's great joy, for he is now able to straighten out the whole mess and marry the lady detective.

== Cast ==
- Jean Hersholt as Seymour White
- Enid Bennett as Henrietta
- Dorothy Devore as Teddy
- Edgar Kennedy as Trayguard
- Walter Hiers as Bond
- Robert Anderson as Wright
- Jay Belasco
- Mathilde Comont
- Edna Marion as In Hotel Lobby (uncredited)
