= Fighting the Flames =

1925 film by B. Reeves Eason

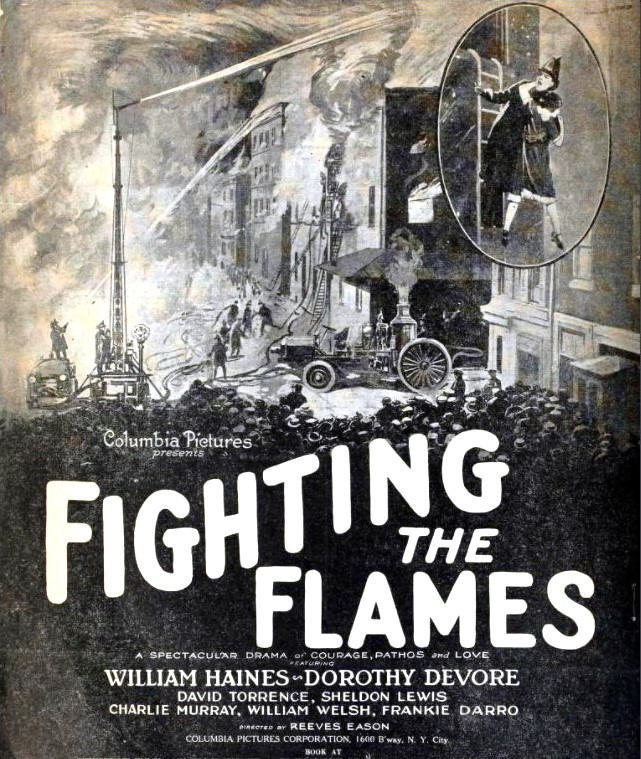
- Film poster
- Directed by: B. Reeves Eason
- Story by: Douglas Z. Doty
- Starring: William Haines; Dorothy Devore; Frankie Darro
- Cinematography: Dewey Wrigley
- Edited by: Viola Lawrence
- Production company: Columbia Pictures
- Distributed by: Columbia Pictures
- Release date: August 23, 1925
- Running time: 6 reels
- Country: United States
- Language: Silent (English intertitles)

Fighting the Flames is a 1925 American silent drama film directed by B. Reeves Eason.

== Plot ==
As described in a film magazine and newspaper reviews, Horatio Manly, the dissolute son of Judge Manly, is rescued drunk from a burning hotel and is arrested. His father disowns him and forbids him from coming home until he can make a man of himself. Horatio makes friends with Mickey, the small son of a pick-pocket named Blacky. The child prevails on Manly to quit drinking alcoholic liquor and become a fireman. Horatio also becomes friendly with Alice Doran, a dressmaker who lives in the upper part of the house where he and Mickey live. Blacky has been doing time, and, when he is released, he tries to make Mickey become a crook. In a struggle with the boy and Alice, Blacky starts a fire in the building that is home for the other three. Manly’s company answers the alarm and Manly rescues Alice and the boy. Blacky is killed and young Manly and his father are reconciled as a result of his heroism.

== Cast ==
- William Haines as Horatio Manly Jr.
- Dorothy Devore as Alice Doran
- Frankie Darro as Mickey
- David Torrence as Judge Manly
- Sheldon Lewis as Big Jim
- William Welsh as Charlie Ryan
- Charles Murray as the pawnbroker

== Production ==
During the filming of the scene where William Welsh goes into a burning building to rescue its occupants, a burning ceiling fell on top of him. He escaped serious injury after William Haines quickly lifted the ceiling off of him.

== Preservation and status ==
A mostly complete copy, with the end of the final reel missing, is held at the Library of Congress.
