= Million Dollar Mystery (1927 film) =

1927 film

- Directed by: Charles J. Hunt
- Produced by: Trem Carr
- Starring: James Kirkwood; Lila Lee
- Cinematography: Hap Depew
- Production company: Trem Carr Pictures
- Distributed by: Rayart Pictures
- Release date: August 1, 1927
- Running time: 6 reels
- Country: United States
- Language: Silent..English titles

Million Dollar Mystery is a 1927 silent film mystery starring a real-life married couple, James Kirkwood and Lila Lee. It was directed by Charles J. Hunt and produced by an independent film company. It survives today in a foreign archive.

== Cast ==
- James Kirkwood as James Norton
- Lila Lee as Florence Grey
- Henry Sedley as Leo Braine
- Erin La Bissoniere as Olga Perigoff
- Elmer Dewey as Boris Orloff
- Edward Gordon as Alec Felton
- John Elliott as Stanley Hargreaves/Inspector Jedson
