= False Kisses =

1921 film

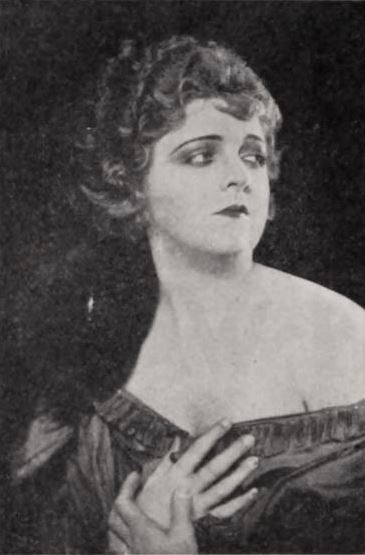
- Directed by: Paul Scardon
- Written by: Wallace Clifton; Winifred Reeve
- Based on: Ropes by Wilbur Daniel Steele
- Produced by: Carl Laemmle
- Starring: Miss DuPont; Pat O'Malley; Lloyd Whitlock
- Cinematography: Ben F. Reynolds
- Production company: Universal Pictures
- Distributed by: Universal Pictures
- Release date: November 21, 1921
- Running time: 50 minutes
- Country: United States
- Language: Silent (English intertitles)

False Kisses is a 1921 American silent drama film directed by Paul Scardon and starring Miss DuPont, Pat O'Malley, and Lloyd Whitlock.

== Cast ==
- Miss DuPont as Jennie
- Pat O'Malley as Paul
- Lloyd Whitlock as Jim
- Camilla Clark as Pauline
- Percy Challenger as John Peters
- Madge Hunt as Mrs. Simpson
- Fay Winthrop as Mrs. Glimp
- Joseph Hazelton as Mr. Glimp
- Mary Philbin as Mary

== Bibliography ==
- Munden, Kenneth White. The American Film Institute Catalog of Motion Pictures Produced in the United States, Part 1. University of California Press, 1997.
