= Taking Chances (1922 film) =

1922 silent film

Taking Chances is a 1922 American silent film. A showing in Cleveland Heights was interrupted by police for violating Blue Laws prohibiting Sunday (Sabbath) entertainment showings and performances. Arrests were made.

== Plot ==
A book salesman (Talmadge) talks his way into a position as secretary to a millionaire capitalist (Challenger) and eventually wins the hand of the mans daughter (Gray) by foiling a plot against her father's wealth and punishing one of the plotters (Dewey).

== Production ==
The film was produced by Phil Goldstone Productions, with Grover Jones as the director and Harry M. Fowler as the cinematographer.

== Cast ==
- Richard Talmadge as himself
- Zella Gray as Mildred Arlington
- Elmer Dewey as José Borquez
- Percy Challenger as James Arlington
