= The Magnificent Brute (1921 film) =

1921 film

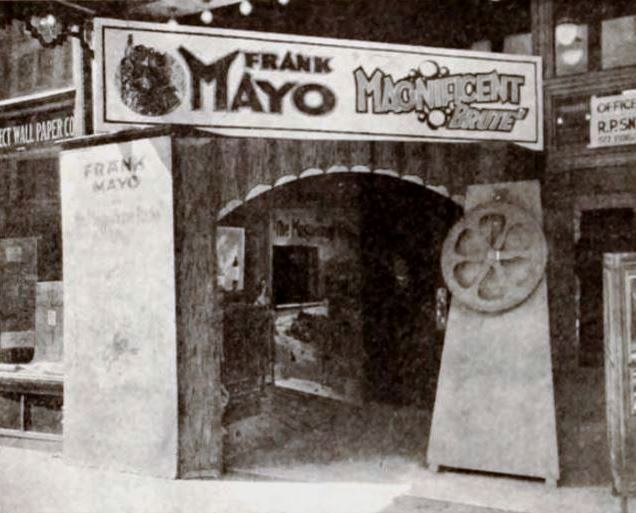
- Directed by: Robert Thornby
- Written by: Malcolm Stuart Boylan; Lucien Hubbard
- Produced by: Carl Laemmle
- Starring: Frank Mayo; Dorothy Devore; Percy Challenger
- Cinematography: William Fildew
- Production company: Universal Pictures
- Distributed by: Universal Pictures
- Release date: March 1921
- Running time: 50 minutes
- Country: United States
- Languages: Silent; English intertitles

The Magnificent Brute is a 1921 American silent drama film directed by Robert Thornby and starring Frank Mayo, Dorothy Devore and Percy Challenger.

== Cast ==
- Frank Mayo as Victor Raoul
- Dorothy Devore as Yvonne
- Percy Challenger as Fontaine
- Alberta Lee as Mrs. Fontaine
- J. Jiquel Lanoe as Marquis Courtière
- Eagle Eye as Indian
- Charles Edler as Kendrick
- Dick Sutherland as Randall
- Eli Stanton as Woodsman
- Buck Moulton as Woodsman
- Lillian Ortez as Maid

== Bibliography ==
- Connelly, Robert B. The Silents: Silent Feature Films, 1910-36, Volume 40, Issue 2. December Press, 1998.
- Munden, Kenneth White. The American Film Institute Catalog of Motion Pictures Produced in the United States, Part 1. University of California Press, 1997.
