= Jim the Penman =

Jim the Penman may refer to:

- Emanuel Ninger (1846/1847–1924), American counterfeiter nicknamed "Jim the Penman"
- James Townshend Saward (1798–c. 1875), English barrister and forger nicknamed "Jim the Penman"
- Jim the Penman, a play by Charles Lawrence Young (1839–1887) featuring a fictional version of Saward
- Jim the Penman (1915 film), an American silent film adaptation of the play, starring John B. Mason
- Jim the Penman (1921 film), an American silent film adaptation of the play, starring Lionel Barrymore

== See also ==
- Jim Penman, Australian businessman and biohistorian
- James Penman, Scottish footballer
