= James Townshend Saward =

English barrister and forger (1798–1875)

James Townshend Saward (1798 – c. 1875) was a Victorian English barrister and forger also known by the nickname of Jem the Penman. In addition to his legal career he forged money orders for almost 30 years.

== Early life ==
James Townshend Saward was born in 1798 at Rotherhithe in Surrey, the son of James and Elizabeth Ann Saward. He was called to the Bar in 1840, became a barrister and had his chambers in the Inner Temple. With his wife Maria he had a son, Francis (born 1831), and a daughter, Henrietta (born 1837).

== Career ==
James Townshend Saward, Jem the Penman, in The Chronicles of Newgate

At the time a normal forging method was to forge somebody's signature and take the money order in to bank. The only hope to recover the money was if the clerk remembered the culprit's face. To bypass even this risk, Saward decided to cover his tracks with a string of accomplices.

Saward required blank cheques and told his accomplices to spread a rumor that they would pay well for stolen cheques; pickpockets usually threw them away as useless. If he got used cheques into his hands, he could try to imitate the signature. If the holder of the account had a special signature he used only in his cheques, Saward sent an accomplice to acquire a copy. One solicitor was fooled by asking him to collect a debt; Saward got the signature when he paid the debt minus his commission by a cheque.

Saward cashed the cheques by handing them over to an accomplice called Anderson, who gave them to another accomplice called Atwell. Atwell disguised himself, hired a messenger and sent him to the bank to get the money. Anderson followed Atwell to make sure he really did hand over all the money and later gave him his cut. When the bank became suspicious, they had only the errand boy to question. This way Saward got a couple of hundred pounds at a time.

In addition, Saward and his associates fenced stolen goods; they helped with the disposal of the stolen gold from the Great Gold Robbery of 1855.

Eventually banks grew suspicious in London and Saward decided to try his luck elsewhere. In Great Yarmouth, another accomplice called Hardwicke blundered when he opened an account with one name and commissioned solicitors to collect "debts" by another name. When he realized his mistake, he asked for instructions. By the time Saward's answer came, the bank had warned the police who were already questioning Hardwicke. They opened the letter and found out his identity.

The Great Yarmouth accomplices confessed and turned Queen's Evidence. Saward and Anderson were arrested and went to trial in March 1857. They were sentenced to transportation for life and sent to Australia.

== In popular culture ==
In his play, Jim the Penman (1886), the barrister and playwright Sir Charles Young, 7th Baronet, expanded the scope of the fictional version of Saward, making him a leader of an international forgery ring who forged letters to marry into high society. The play was later adapted into two films, both titled Jim the Penman, in 1915 with John B. Mason, and in 1921 with Lionel Barrymore playing Saward.

Saward has been referred to as "a 'real-life' Professor Moriarty".
