= Sidman =

Sidman may refer to:

- Arthur C. Sidman (1863–1901), American vaudeville performer and playwright
- Joyce Sidman (born 1956), American children's writer
- Murray Sidman, American psychologist
  - Sidman Avoidance, his discovery
- Sam Sidman (1871–1948), American actor

== Other uses ==
- Sidman, Pennsylvania, a community in the United States
