= Bare-knuckle =

Bare-knuckle means without gloves, bandages or any other protection for and/or dangerous 'arming' (such as a knuckle-duster) of the knuckles, a larger part or even the whole hand. It refers specifically to:

- Bare-knuckle boxing, boxing without boxing gloves
- Bare Knuckles, a 1977 American blaxploitation film directed by Don Edmonds
- Bare Knuckles (1921 film), a 1921 American drama film directed by James P. Hogan
- Bare Knuckle, the original Japanese name for the Streets of Rage series of video games
- Fighting in ice hockey, in ice hockey rule books, fighting is referred to as "fisticuffs" as they fight without gloves, and is therefore "bare-knuckle"
- Vale tudo, a name for a form of no rules fighting from Brazil
- Bare Knuckle Pickups, a business that produces hand-wound guitar pickups in the United Kingdom
