= First auto =

First auto may refer to:

- The First Auto, a 1927 film
- Benz Patent-Motorwagen, the first automobile
