= Share and Share Alike =

Share and Share Alike may refer to:

- Share and Share Alike (film)
- Share and Share Alike (radio series)
