= George Melville =

George Melville may refer to:

- George W. Melville (1841–1912), US Navy rear admiral, engineer, Arctic explorer and author
- George Melville, 1st Earl of Melville (1636–1707), Scots aristocrat, statesman, and member of the Melville family
- George Melville (bushranger) (c.1822–1853), criminal in colonial Victoria
- George Melville (actor) who appeared in films including The Light of Happiness in 1916

== See also ==
- George Melville-Jackson (1919–2009), Royal Air Force officer
- George Whyte-Melville (1821–1878), Scottish novelist
