= Charles Emmett Mack =

American actor

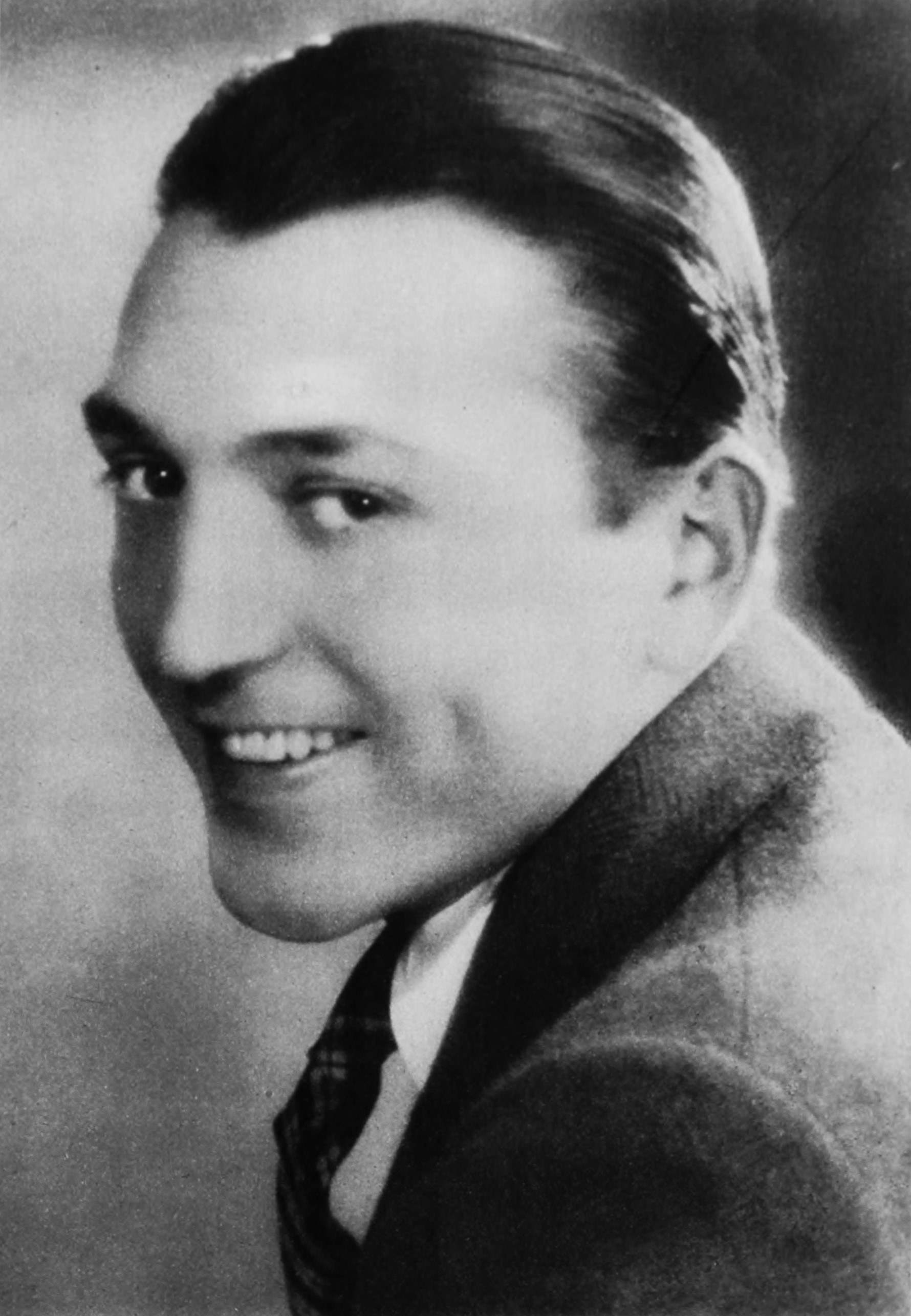
- Mack in Motion Picture Classic, 1926
- Born: Charles Stewert McNerney; November 25, 1900; Scranton, Pennsylvania, U.S.
- Died: March 17, 1927 (aged 26); Riverside, California, U.S.
- Occupation: Actor
- Spouse: Marianne Lovera (1922-1927, his death)

Charles Emmett Mack (November 25, 1900 – March 17, 1927), was an American film actor during the silent film era. He appeared in seventeen films between 1916 and 1927. He died in a car accident.

== Biography ==
Born Charles Emmett McNerney in Scranton, Pennsylvania, to an Irish family, at a young age Mack could speak three or four languages. One of Mack's early jobs was as a peanut vendor at the Ringling Brothers Circus. After that, he appeared in vaudeville, specializing in buck-and-wing dancing. Later he became a tour guide for D.W. Griffith's Mamaroneck Studios. After that he was Griffith's prop man, fetching all sorts of props for the director.

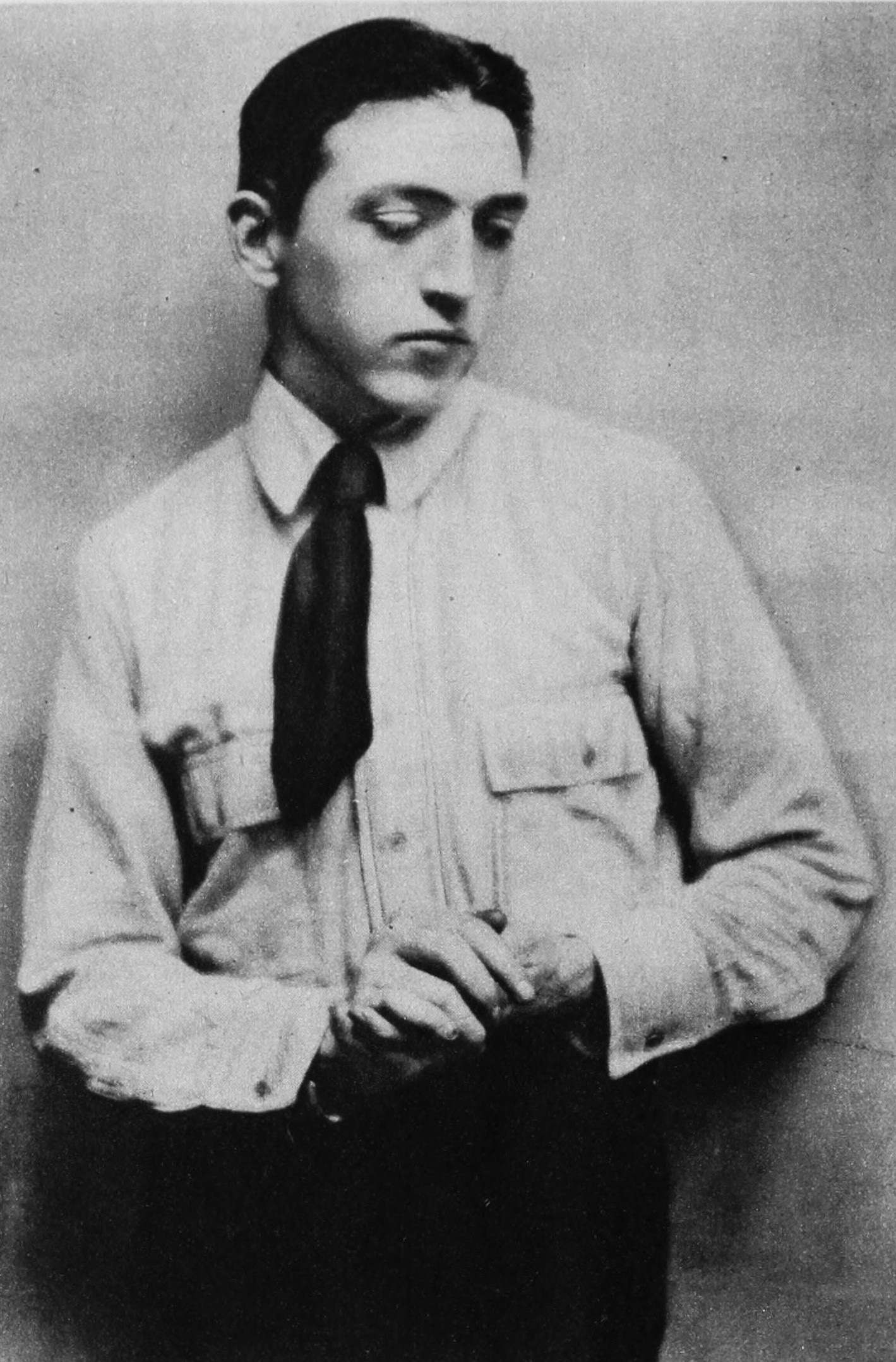
Mack in Motion Picture Classic, 1926

One day, Griffith invited Mack to rehearse a scene from Dream Street with him. Mack enjoyed the part he had and thought Griffith was friendly. He ended up playing the lead.

While filming America in 1924, a soldier's arm was blown off. As Mack recalls, "Neil Hamilton and I went to neighboring towns and raised a fund for him—I doing a song and dance and Neil collecting a coin."

== Death ==
After signing with Warner Brothers, Mack was killed when the car he was driving collided with another and overturned on his way to a racetrack in Riverside, California to film an auto racing scene for the film The First Auto (1927). He was 26 years old.

Mack was survived by his wife, Marianne Lovera Mack, an actress and screenwriter. She was born in Italy and came to the United States when she was three. She was cast in Renaud Hoffman's A Harp in Hock (1927).

== Filmography ==
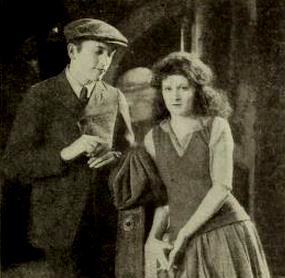
Still with Mack and Carol Dempster in Dream Street (1921)

- Dolly's Scoop (1916)
- Dream Street (1921)
- One Exciting Night (1922)
- Driven (1923)
- The White Rose (1923)
- The Daring Years (1923)
- America (1924)
- The Sixth Commandment (1924)
- Youth for Sale (1924)
- Bad Company (1925)
- Down Upon the Suwanee River (1925)
- A Woman of the World (1925)
- The Devil's Circus (1926)
- The Unknown Soldier (1926)
- Old San Francisco (1927)
- The First Auto (1927)
- The Rough Riders (1927)
