= Sinners (1920 film) =

1920 film by Kenneth Webb

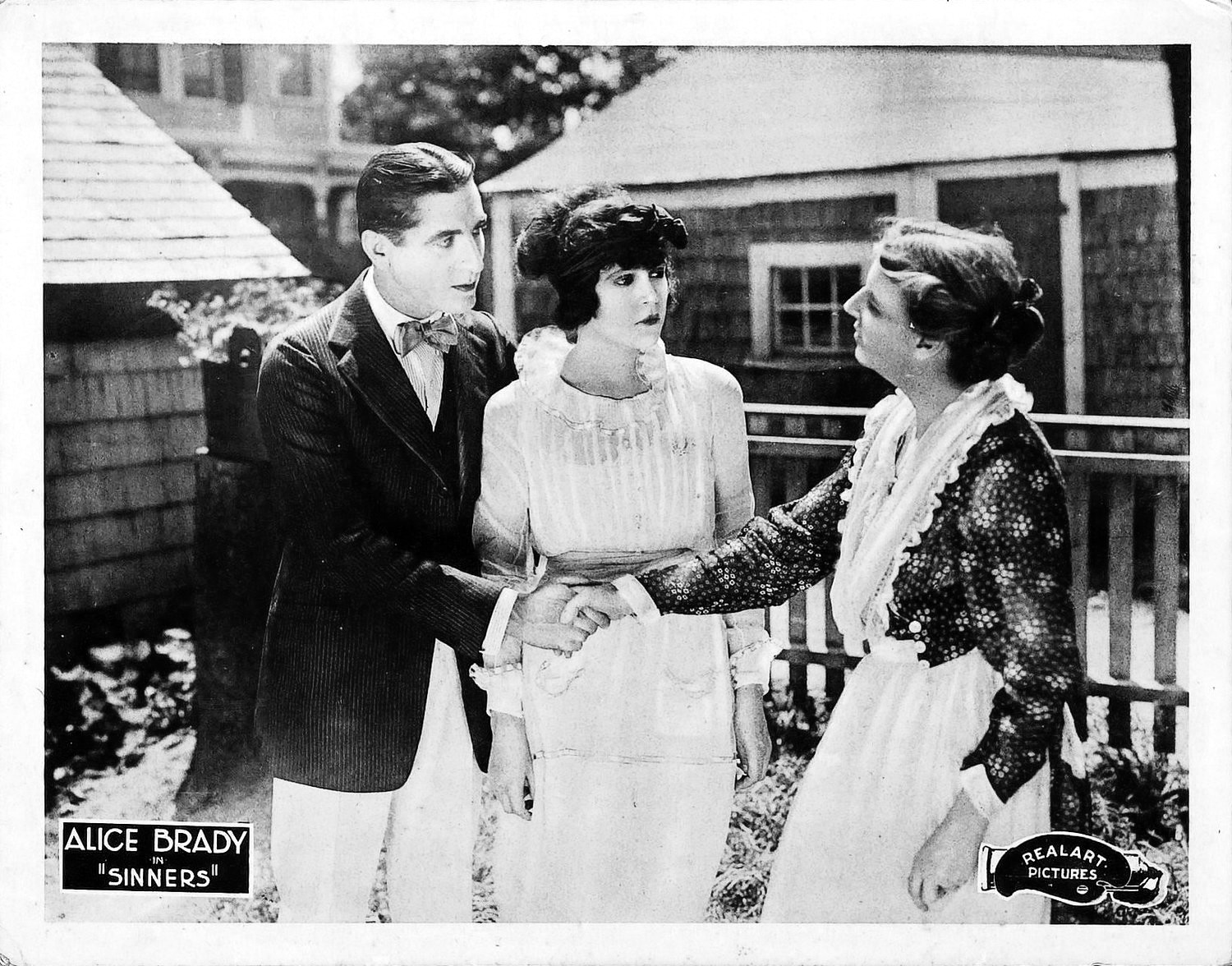
- Lobby card
- Directed by: Kenneth Webb; Daniel Pennell (ass't director)
- Written by: Owen Davis (play)
- Starring: Alice Brady; James L. Crane
- Cinematography: George J. Folsey
- Production company: Realart Pictures Corporation
- Distributed by: Realart Pictures Corporation
- Release date: March 15, 1920
- Running time: 50 minutes
- Country: United States
- Language: Silent (English intertitles)

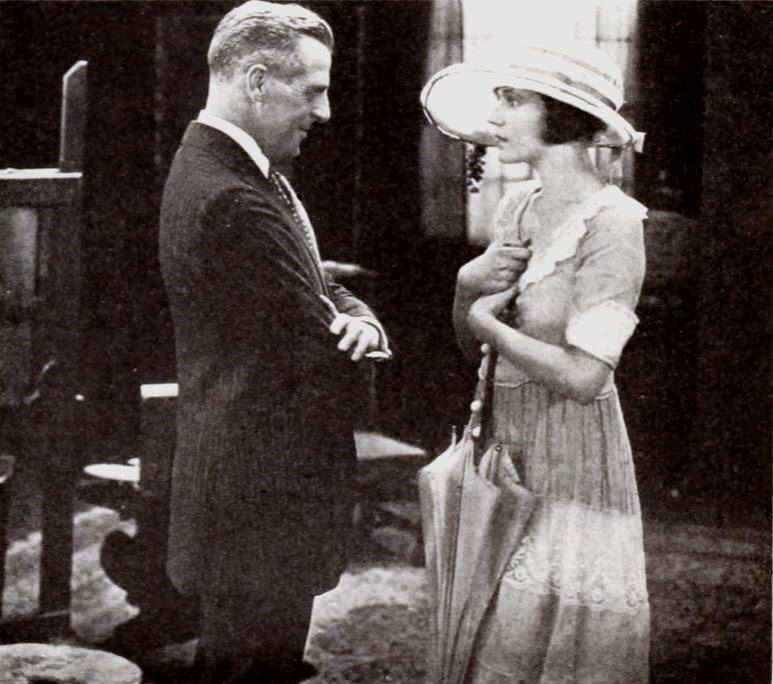
Film still

Sinners is a lost 1920 American silent drama film based on a play of the same name by Owen Davis. The play was produced by William A. Brady and starred his daughter Alice Brady who also stars in this film. It was produced and released by Realart Pictures Corporation. Alice Brady's husband James Crane appears in this picture as well as in her next film, A Dark Lantern.

== Plot ==
Based upon a review in a film publication, the plot contrasts the corrupt gay life of the city with the dignity and wholesome life of people in the country. When Mary Horton goes to the city seeking work but fails to find it, she is befriended by Hilda Newton, a woman of questionable reputation. The friends of this woman are the sinners of the film and when word of Mary's association with them reaches home, there are some false accusations made against Mary. After Mary returns to her home, her city friends come to visit, leading to some dramatic situations.

== Cast ==
- Alice Brady as Mary Horton
- Agnes Everett as Mrs. Horton
- Augusta Anderson as Hilda Newton
- Lorraine Frost as Polly Gary
- Nora Reed as Saidee
- James Crane as Bob Merrick
- William T. Carleton as Horace Worth
- Frank Losee as William Morgan
- Crauford Kent as Dr. Simpson
- Robert Schable as Joe Garfield

== Production ==
Exteriors for Sinners were filmed on location in Nantucket.
