= His Wife's Husband (1922 American film) =

1922 film

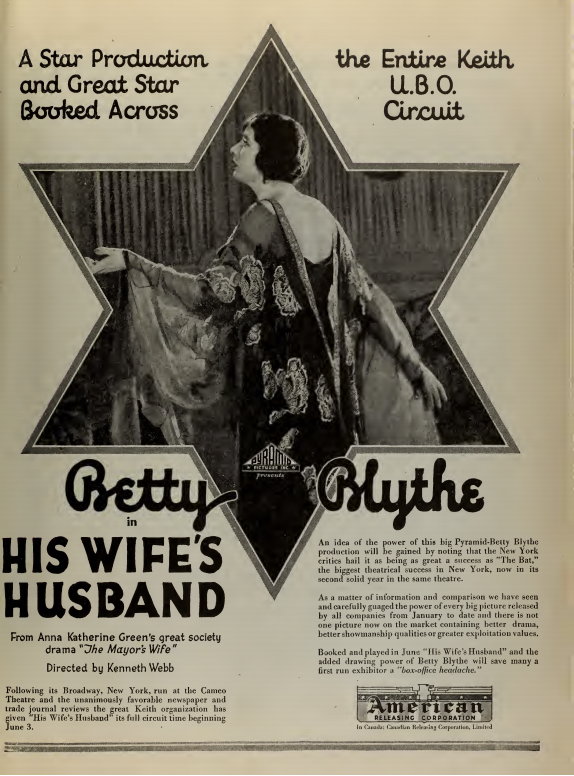
- Directed by: Kenneth S. Webb
- Written by: Dorothy Farnum; Kenneth S. Webb
- Based on: The Mayor's Wife by Anna Katharine Green
- Starring: Betty Blythe; Huntley Gordon; Arthur Edmund Carewe
- Cinematography: Harry Stradling Sr.
- Production company: Pyramid Pictures
- Distributed by: American Releasing Corporation
- Release date: May 14, 1922
- Running time: 60 minutes
- Country: United States
- Language: Silent (English intertitles)

His Wife's Husband is a 1922 American silent drama film directed by Kenneth S. Webb and starring Betty Blythe, Huntley Gordon, and Arthur Edmund Carewe. It is an adaptation of the 1907 novel The Mayor's Wife by Anna Katharine Green.

== Plot ==
As described in a film magazine review, "Olympia Brewster, a young college-bred woman, becomes a waitress at a mediocre hotel, and then marries a man she does not love to escape this drudgery. Immediately after the ceremony, she realizes his true character and leaves him, fleeing the hotel just as a gunshot is fired downstairs. Through a window she sees her husband prostrate and believes him killed. Later she reads his death notice in a newspaper. Not long thereafter Olympia's uncle dies, leaving her a small fortune. She marries a prosperous young attorney who becomes mayor, and later a candidate for governor. During a political crisis, he hires a secretary that he takes into his home. The secretary gives his name as Steele, though he bears a sterling resemblance to the wastrel Olympia had married. Steele disarms her suspicions, but, after arranging the betrayal of the mayor to his political opponents, Steele brazenly informs his employer that he is his wife's husband and will have to be so acknowledged, or the mayor will have to withdrawal his candidacy for governor. An aged lady who has become Olympia's guest through unusual circumstances places in Olympia's hands the papers needed to thwart Steele's scheme, a certificate of marriage between Steele and a servant that is now Olympia's housekeeper."

== Cast ==
- Betty Blythe as Olympia Brewster
- Huntley Gordon as George Packard
- Arthur Edmund Carewe as John Brainerd
- George Fawcett as Dominick Duffy
- Grace Goodall as Bess
- Blanche Davenport as Mrs. Althorpe
- Rita Maurice as Baby Packard

== Bibliography ==
- Connelly, Robert B. The Silents: Silent Feature Films, 1910-36, Volume 40, Issue 2. December Press, 1998.
- Goble, Alan. The Complete Index to Literary Sources in Film. Walter de Gruyter, 1999.
- Munden, Kenneth White. The American Film Institute Catalog of Motion Pictures Produced in the United States, Part 1. University of California Press, 1997.
