= A Man of Iron =

1925 silent film

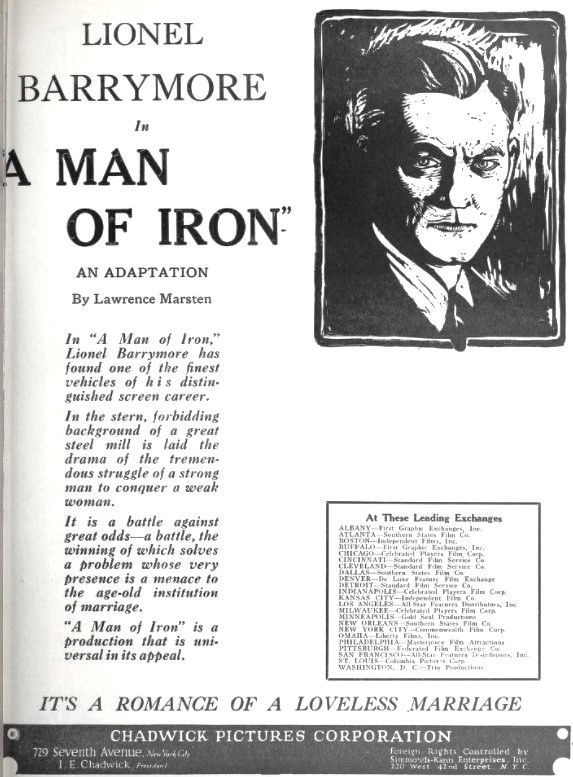
- Advertisement
- Directed by: Whitman Bennett
- Written by: Lawrence Marston
- Produced by: Whitman Bennett
- Starring: Lionel Barrymore; Mildred Harris
- Cinematography: Edward Paul
- Production company: Whitman Bennett Productions
- Distributed by: Chadwick Pictures
- Release date: June 28, 1925
- Running time: 5 reels
- Country: United States
- Language: Silent (English intertitles)

A Man of Iron (also known as The Iron Man) is a 1925 American silent drama film produced and directed by Whitman Bennett and distributed through Chadwick Pictures. The film starred Lionel Barrymore.

== Plot ==
As described in a film magazine review, Philip Durban marries Claire Bowdoin, a spoiled daughter of an improvised society matron. Their marriage as such is in name only. Claire loves Prince Novakian, a worthless fortune hunter. Within a year, Claire comes to love her husband, but he resents her advances. Ill, Claire goes to Italy for a rest. Once there, the Prince annoys her with his advances, so she sends for her husband. Arriving in Italy, Philip strikes the Prince, who challenges him to a duel. The Prince is killed and, with this cloud removed, Philip and Claire have a life of sunshine.

== Cast ==
- Lionel Barrymore as Philip Durban
- Mildred Harris as Claire Bowdoin
- Winifred Barry as Martha Durban
- Dorothy Kingdon as Edith Bowdoin
- Alfred Mack as Hugh Bowdoin
- J. Moy Bennett as Denis Callahan
- Isobel De Leon as Maybelle Callahan
- Jean Del Val as Prince Novakian

== Preservation ==
With no prints of A Man of Iron located in any film archives, it is a lost film.

== See also ==
- List of lost films
- Lionel Barrymore filmography
