= Trouping with Ellen =

1924 film by T. Hayes Hunter

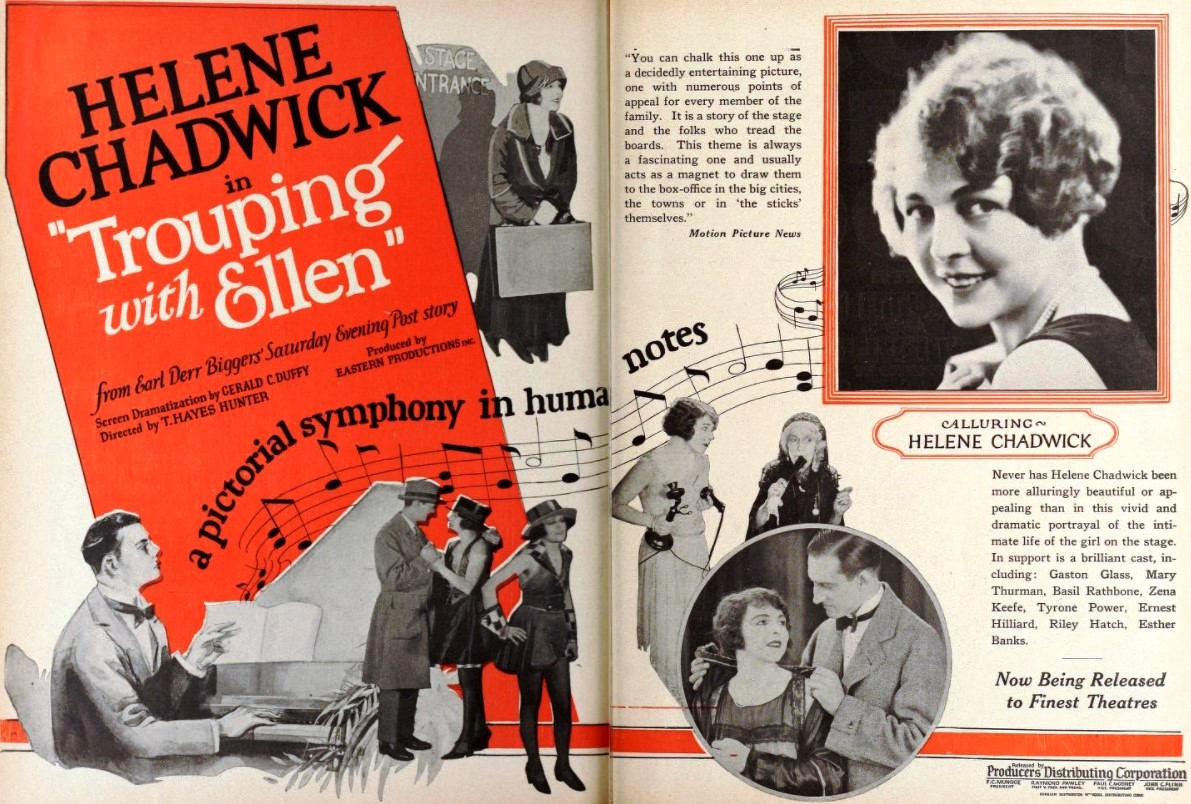
- Advertisement
- Directed by: T. Hayes Hunter
- Written by: Gerald Duffy
- Based on: "Trouping with Ellen" by Earl Derr Biggers
- Produced by: Eastern Productions
- Starring: Helene Chadwick; Mary Thurman; Gaston Glass
- Cinematography: J. Roy Hunt
- Production company: Eastern Productions
- Distributed by: Producers Distributing Corporation
- Release date: October 5, 1924 (U.S.)
- Country: United States
- Language: Silent (English intertitles)

Trouping with Ellen is a 1924 American silent comedy film starring Basil Rathbone, Gaston Glass, Helene Chadwick, and Mary Thurman. Based on a short story by Earl Derr Biggers that appeared in The Saturday Evening Post, this was Rathbone's first American production.

== Cast ==
- Helene Chadwick as Ellen Llewellyn
- Mary Thurman as Lil
- Gaston Glass as Andy Owens
- Basil Rathbone as Tony Winterslip
- Riley Hatch as 'The Old Man'
- Zena Keefe as Mabel Llewellyn
- Kate Blancke as Mrs. Lleweellyn
- Tyrone Power Sr. as Mr. Llewellyn
- John Tansey as Dave Llewellyn
- Charles Mcdonald as Dan
- Ernest Hilliard as Jack Prentice
- Jane Jennings as Tony's Mother
- Estar Banks as Tony's Grandmother

== Preservation ==
With no copies of Trouping with Ellen located in any film archives, it is a lost film.
