= The Rough Riders (film) =

1927 film by Victor Fleming

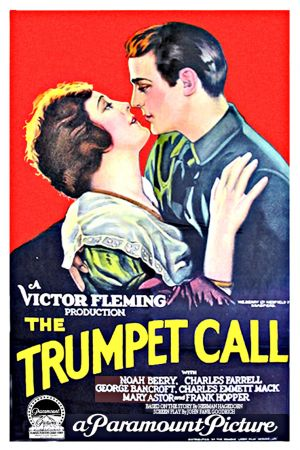
- Poster with the film's alternate release title The Trumpet Call
- Directed by: Victor Fleming
- Written by: Herman Hagedorn (story); John F. Goodrich (adapt.); Robert N. Lee (writer); Keene Thompson (writer); George Marion, Jr. (intertitles)
- Produced by: Lucien Hubbard; B. P. Schulberg
- Starring: Noah Beery; Charles Farrell; George Bancroft; Charles Emmett Mack; Mary Astor; Frank Hooper
- Cinematography: James Wong Howe; E. Burton Steene
- Edited by: E. Lloyd Sheldon
- Music by: Hugo Riesenfeld; J. S. Zamecnik
- Distributed by: Paramount Pictures
- Release dates: March 15, 1927 (New York City premiere); February 13, 1928 (Finland)
- Running time: 105 minutes (13 reels)
- Country: United States
- Languages: Silent Version; Sound Version (Synchronized) (English intertitles)
- Budget: $1,410,000

The Rough Riders is a 1927 American silent drama film directed by Victor Fleming, released by Paramount Pictures, and starring Noah Beery, Sr., Charles Farrell, George Bancroft, and Mary Astor. Due to the public apathy towards silent films, a sound version was also prepared early in 1928. While the sound version has no audible dialog, it was released with a synchronized musical score with sound effects using both the sound-on-disc and sound-on-film process. The picture is fictional account of Theodore Roosevelt's military unit in Cuba. This film had an alternate release title, The Trumpet Call. The cinematography was by James Wong Howe and E. Burton Steene.

== Cast ==
- Noah Beery as Hell's Bells
- Charles Farrell as Stuart Van Brunt
- George Bancroft as Happy Joe
- Charles Emmett Mack as Bert Henley
- Mary Astor as Dolly
- Frank Hopper as Theodore Roosevelt (some sources list him as Frank Hooper)
- Fred Lindsay as Leonard Wood
- Fred Kohler as Sgt. Stanton
- Mark Hamilton as a soldier

== Music ==
The sound version featured a theme song entitled “Goodbye Dolly Gray,” with lyrics by Will D. Cobb and music by Paul Barnes. Also featured was the song entitled “The Rough Riders” which was composed by Hugo Riesenfeld.

== Preservation ==
Incomplete or fragment prints of The Rough Riders are extant at the Museum of Modern Art and the Library of Congress.
