= Love of Women =

1924 film

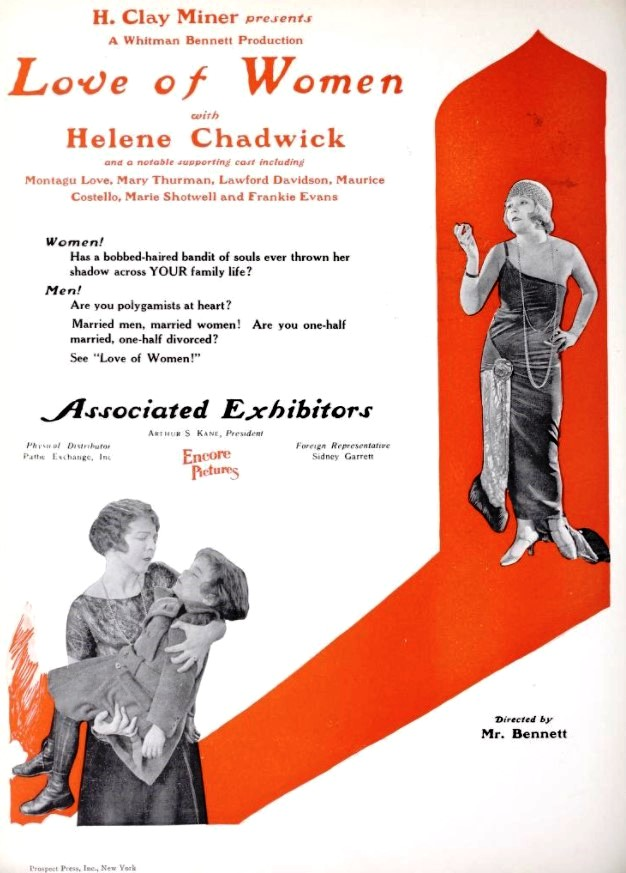
- Trade advertisement
- Directed by: Whitman Bennett
- Written by: E.C. Holland
- Produced by: Whitman Bennett
- Starring: Helene Chadwick; Montagu Love; Maurice Costello
- Cinematography: Edward Paul
- Production company: Interlocutory Films
- Distributed by: Selznick Pictures
- Release date: June 30, 1924
- Running time: 60 minutes
- Country: United States
- Language: Silent (English intertitles)

Love of Women is a 1924 American silent drama film directed by Whitman Bennett and starring Helene Chadwick, Montagu Love, and Maurice Costello.

== Synopsis ==
An unscrupulous millionaire schemes to break up a marriage with the aid of a vamp.

== Cast ==
- Helene Chadwick as Cynthia Redfield
- Montagu Love as Bronson Gibbs
- Maurice Costello as Mr. Redfield
- Mary Thurman as Veerah Vale
- Lawford Davidson as Ernest Herrick
- Marie Shotwell as Eugenie Redfield
- Frank Evans as Frankie

== Preservation ==
With no prints of Love of Women located in any film archives, it is a lost film.

== Bibliography ==
- Munden, Kenneth White. The American Film Institute Catalog of Motion Pictures Produced in the United States, Part 1. University of California Press, 1997.
