= Down Upon the Suwanee River =

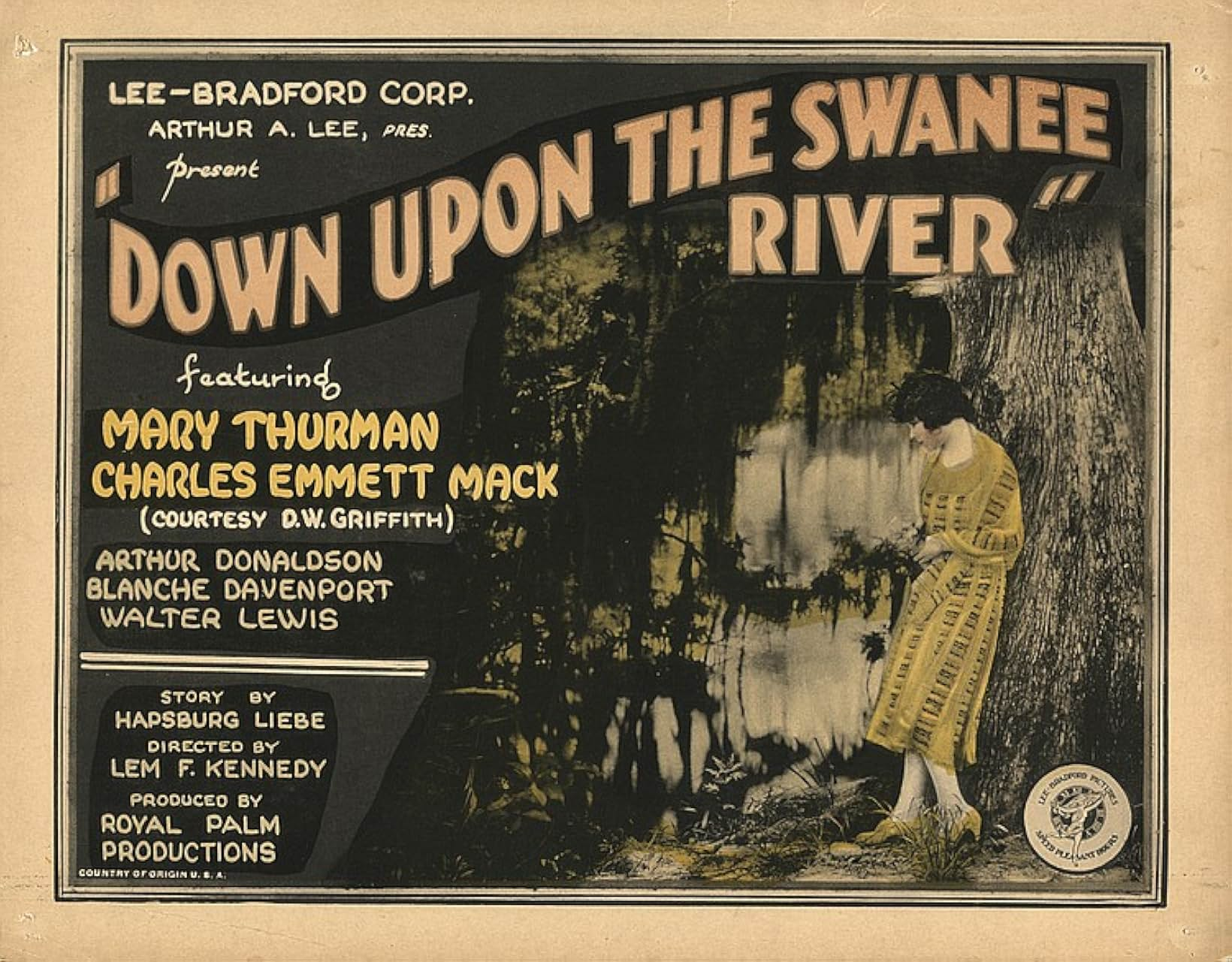
- Directed by: Lem F. Kennedy
- Written by: Hapsburg Liebe
- Produced by: Arthur A. Lee
- Starring: Charles Emmett Mack; Mary Thurman; Arthur Donaldson
- Production company: Royal Palm Productions
- Distributed by: Lee-Bradford Corporation
- Release date: October 21, 1925
- Running time: 60 minutes
- Country: United States
- Language: Silent (English intertitles)

Down Upon the Suwanee River is a 1925 American silent drama film directed by Lem F. Kennedy and starring Charles Emmett Mack, Mary Thurman, and Arthur Donaldson. The spelling of the film's title, which is from the first line of the Stephen Foster song "Old Folks at Home", varied with both Swanee and Suwannee used. In Britain it was released by Wardour Films.

== Plot ==
As described in a film magazine review, Mary, the daughter of the village "big man" Dais Norwood, loves the good-natured ne'er-do-well Bill Ruble, who denies the existence of God. The young woman and man elope, and upon their return Bill is forced to leave town. The young woman's brother Herbert steals money to pay the debts he owes a gambler, and confesses to her husband, who plays cards with the gambler to win back the money, which he does. He attempts to return the stolen money and is accused of theft. He escapes and signs up as a deckhand on a ship going around the world. Meanwhile, Mary has given birth to a child, and is disowned by the village. She attempts to drown herself and is saved by Uncle Jasper, a negro servant. Bill returns from his voyage, having confessed to now believing in God, and the young couple and her father are reunited by the baby.

== Cast ==
- Charles Emmett Mack as Bill Ruble
- Mary Thurman as Mary Norwood
- Arthur Donaldson as Dais Norwood
- Walter Merrill as Herbert Norwood
- Walter P. Lewis as Reverend John Banner
- Blanche Davenport as Old Mag
- Charles Shannon as Hoss-Fly Henson
- Major Alfred Goggins as Uncle Jasper (uncredited)

== Production ==
Down Upon the Suwanee River was filmed on location in Florida, and actress Mary Thurman caught malaria. She finished the film and went to New York City where she was admitted to a hospital. She succumbed to a case of pneumonia on December 22, 1925, at age 30.

Uncle Jasper is noted as being an early example of a positive black character in a film.

== Bibliography ==
- James Michael Hunter. Mormons and Popular Culture: The Global Influence of an American Phenomenon, Volume 2. ABC-CLIO, 2013.
