= Back to Life (1925 film) =

1925 film

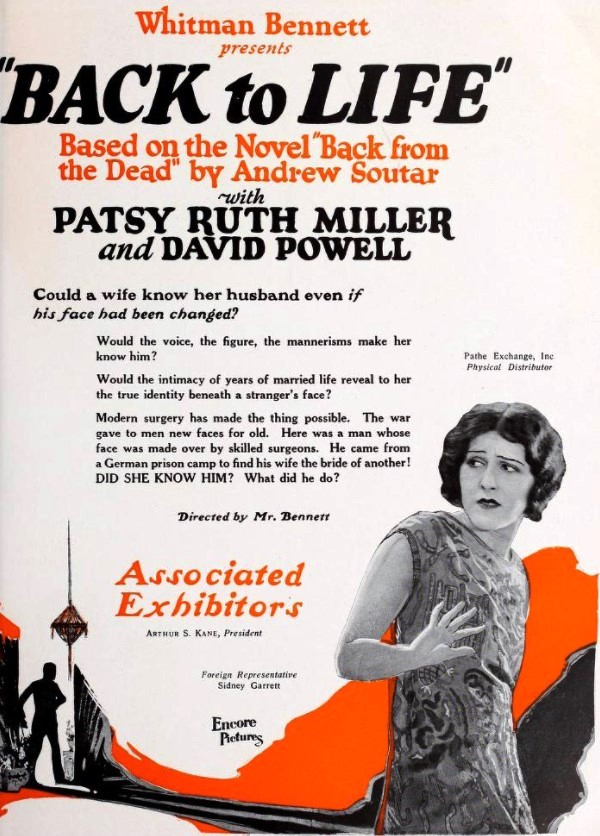
- Advertisement
- Directed by: Whitman Bennett
- Written by: Harry Chandlee
- Based on: Back From the Dead by Andrew Soutar
- Produced by: Whitman Bennett
- Starring: Patsy Ruth Miller; David Powell; Lawford Davidson
- Cinematography: Edward Paul
- Production company: Postman Pictures
- Distributed by: Pathé Exchange; Butcher's Film Service (UK)
- Release date: February 22, 1925
- Running time: 60 minutes
- Country: United States
- Language: Silent (English intertitles)

Back to Life is a 1925 American silent war drama film directed by Whitman Bennett and starring Patsy Ruth Miller, David Powell, and Lawford Davidson.

== Plot ==
As described in a film magazine review, Margaret Lothbury receives news that her husband, an American volunteer aviator serving with the Lafayette Escadrille during World War I, died at the front. In reality, John Lothbury has been picked up by a British ambulance unit and placed in a British hospital. Here by the marvelous, newly developed science of facial surgery, Lothbury is given a new face. On return to America he finds his wife married to Wallace Straker, richest man in town. The union is an unhappy one. Lothbury adopts the name Walpole and withholds his identity. He assumes guardianship of his son while the Strakers tour Europe, and while abroad Margaret Lothbury becomes acquainted with the real facts of Lothbury’s disappearance from the battlefield. Later circumstances confirm her suspicions that Walpole is in reality her husband. Revelations follow leading to the re-union of the family.

== Cast ==
- Patsy Ruth Miller as Margaret Lothbury
- David Powell as John Lothbury
- Lawford Davidson as Wallace Straker
- Mary Thurman as Jane Porter
- George Stewart as Arthur Lothbury
- Frederick Burton as Henry Porter
- Frankie Evans as Sonny Lothbury

== Preservation ==
With no prints of Back to Life located in any film archives, it is a lost film.

== Bibliography ==
- Munden, Kenneth White. The American Film Institute Catalog of Motion Pictures Produced in the United States, Part 1. University of California Press, 1997.
