= Lorraine Frost =

American actress (1892–1983)

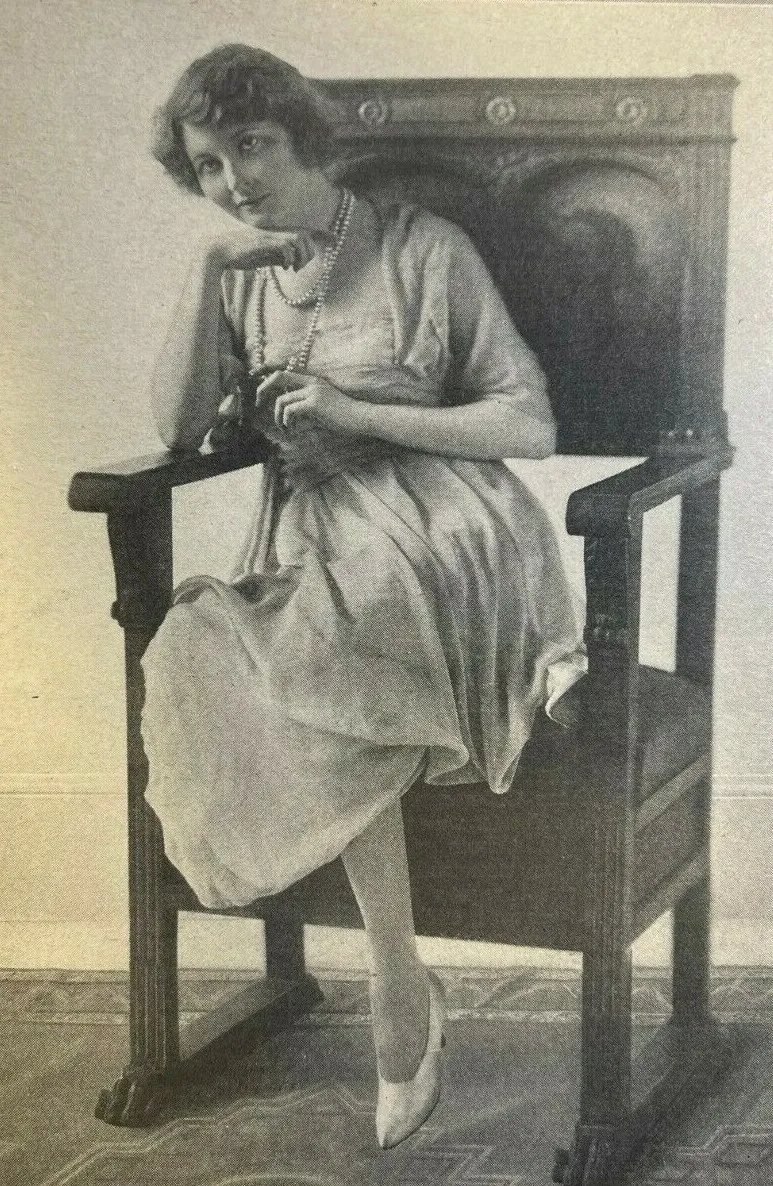
- Photograph of Lorraine Frost sitting in a chair (circa 1919)
- Born: September 13, 1892; New York, U.S.
- Died: February 10, 1983 (aged 90); Los Angeles County, California, U.S.
- Occupation: Actress
- Spouse: Kenneth Webb

Lorraine Frost (13 September 1892 – 10 February 1983) was an American silent film and theater actress. She was best known for her roles in The Light of Happiness (1916), Sinners (1920) and The Truth About Husbands (1920).

== Career ==
=== Theatre ===
Frost started her career in theater around 1903 (aged 10), and was considered a child prodigy. She made her debut playing Nora in a theatrical adaption of A Little Princess.

She began working with Robert Mantell around 1905, and performed in a number of Shakespeare productions. Her most notable role in theater was Ophelia in Hamlet at age 16, which she was an understudy to Marie Booth Russel.

=== Film ===
Her first role in film was in The Rivals, a short silent film in 1913, as Lydia Languish. After her marriage to Kenneth Webb she starred in multiple of his movies.

== Personal life ==
Frost had a sister, Leila Frost, who was also a child actress. Their mother traveled with the girls when they went on tour, acting as their governess. Frost took a brief break from theatre at age 15 to study in New York.

Frost married director Kenneth Webb. She continued to live in Manhattan, where she had a terrier named Lady.

== Theatre roles ==
Year	Show	Role	Notes	Ref
1903	A Little Princess	Nora		
1904	The Bold Soldier Boy	Millicent Bassett		
1905	A Message From Mars	Minnie		
1907	Richard III	Prince of Wales		
	Macbeth	Fleance		
	The Merchant of Venice	Jessica		
	Julius Caesar	Lucius		
	The Marble Heart	Marie, Thea		
	King Lear	Cordelia		
1909	King John	Prince Henry		
1909	Hamlet	Ophelia		
1910	Rebecca of Sunnybrook Farm	Emma Jane Perkins	Broadway	
1911	The Senator Keeps House		Broadway	
1912	A Fool of Fortune		Broadway	
1915	The Angel in the House		Broadway	
1917	Johnny, Get Your Gun		Broadway	
1918	Johnny, Get Your Gun		Tour	
1918	The Unknown Purple		Broadway	

== Filmography ==
- The Rivals (1913)
- The Light of Happiness (1916)
- God's Half Acre (1916)
- The Inner Ring (1919)
- Sinners (1920)
- The Deep Purple (1920)
- The Truth About Husbands (1920)
- One of the Family (1926)
