= Kenneth Webb (director) =

American film and stage director (1885–1966)

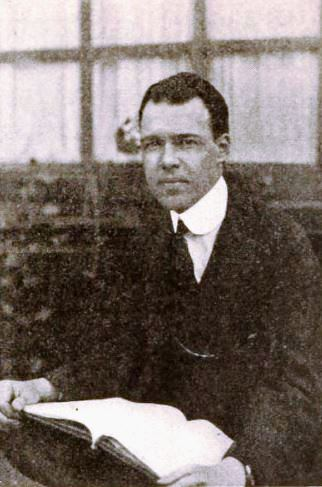
- Born: Kenneth Seymour Webb; October 16, 1885; New York City, New York, U.S.
- Died: March 6, 1966 (aged 80); Hollywood, California, U.S.
- Other name: Kenneth S. Webb
- Education: Columbia University (BA)
- Occupations: Stage and film director, songwriter
- Spouse: Lorraine Frost

Kenneth Seymour Webb (October 16, 1885 – March 6,.1966) was an American film director, screenwriter, and composer. He directed a number of films in the early days of the American film industry before turning to the stage. He adapted the stage musical, Gay Divorce, with Samuel Hoffenstein and Cole Porter

== Early life ==
Webb was born on October 16, 1885, in New York City, New York. His parents were Juliette Seymour Bell and William Edward Webb.

Webb attended The Collegiate School on the Upper West Side of Manhattan. He went on to study at Columbia University, earning a Bachelor of Arts degree in 1906. While there, he participated in dramatics and was a member of Alpha Chi Rho and the Philolexian Society.

== Career ==
Around 1910, Webb became a sketch writer and director for vaudeville. In 1913, he began writing scenarios for the Vitagraph Company. From 1918 to 1919, he was a writer and director for Vitagraph.

From 1919 to 1938, Webb was a writer and director, first with the Famous Players Film Company, then with Whitman Bennett (a production company) and Associated First National Theatres, Inc. (Bennett's distributor), then Fox Film Corporation, then Whitman Bennett (production company) and United Artists (Bennett's distributor), then Burr & Company, then Pathe, then Lee de Forest, Inspiration Pictures, Tiffany Pictures, and then FitzPatrick Pictures. His brother, Roy Webb, also a composer and film director, was one of his chief collaborators.

Webb wrote for the legitimate stage, starting in 1924. He adapted the Gay Divorce with Samuel Hoffenstein and Cole Porter. In 1933, Webb became a radio writer and producer with Batten Barton Durstine & Osborn, Inc.; he was its Western editor, starting in 1953. From 1943 to 1943, Webb was a lecturer of radio writing and production at New York University.

Webb was a charter member of ASCAP in 1914. He served on the council of the Motion Picture Directors Association from 1935 to 1950 and served as its Eastern president from 1923 to 1924. He belonged to the Actors' Equity Association, Radio Directors Guild, and Songwriters Protective Association.

== Personal life ==
Webb married the silent film actress Lorraine Frost on September 20, 1920, in Manhattan, New York.

He belonged to the Society of the Cincinnati and The Lambs.

Webb died on March 6, 1966, in Hollywood, California.

== Selected works ==
=== Filmography ===
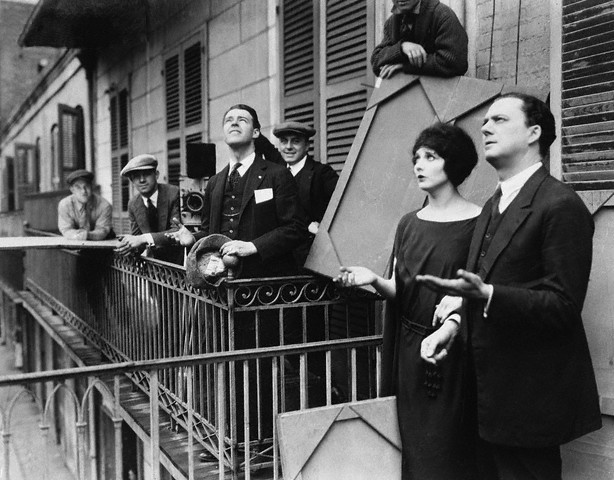
Kenneth Webb (center) on location in New Orleans filming Fair Lady in 1922, with Betty Blythe and Robert Elliott (extreme right).

==== Director ====
- A Bird of Bagdad (1918)
- Mammon the Archer (1918)
- One Thousand Dollars (1918)
- A Ramble in Aphasia (1918)
- Sisters of the Golden Circle (1918)
- Springtime in Á La Carte (1918)
- Tobins Palm (1918)
- Transients in Arcadia (1918)
- The Adventure Shop (1919)
- The Girl Problem (1919)
- His Bridal Night (1919)
- Marie, Ltd. (1919)
- Will You Be Staying for Supper? (1919)
- Sinners (1920)
- The Stolen Kiss (1920)
- The Master Mind (1920)
- The Devil's Garden (1920)
- The Truth About Husbands (it) (1920)
- The Fear Market (1920)
- The Great Adventure (1921)
- Jim the Penman (1921)
- Salvation Nell (1921)
- Fair Lady (1922)
- His Wife's Husband (1922)
- How Women Love (1922)
- The Secrets of Paris (1922)
- Without Fear (1922)
- The Daring Years (1923)
- Three O'Clock in the Morning (1923)
- Alexander Hamilton (1924)
- The Eve of the Revolution (1924)
- Wolfe & Montcalm (1924)
- The Beautiful City (1925)
- Golden Youth (1926)
- Just Suppose (1926)
- Lucky in Love (1929)
- Shave It with Music (1935)

==== Screenwriter ====
- The Arrival of Josie (1914)
- Josie's Declariation of Independence (1914)
- Josie's Coney Island Nightmare (1914)
- Josie's Legacy (1914)
- Susie, the Sleuth (1916)
- Their Godson (1918)
- The Devil's Garden (1920)
- The Master Mind (1920)
- His Wife's Husband (1922)
- Wolfe & Montcalm (1924)
- The Gay Divorcee (1934)

==== Story ====
- Romantic Josie (1914)
- Too Good to Be True (1919)

=== Plays ===
==== Director ====
- The Dream Girl. with Roy D. Webb (Carnegie Lyceum, 1910)
- Polly of Peoria (Carnegie Lyceum, 1911)
- Room of Dreams (Broadway, 1930)

==== Writer ====
- The Dream Girl. with Roy D. Webb (1910)

=== Music ===
- Polly of Peoria, score by Kenneth Webb (words) and Roy Webb (lyrics and music) (1911)
- "You and Me and You" (1919), Kenneth Webb (words) and Roy Webb (music)
