= Dream Street (film) =

1921 film by D. W. Griffith

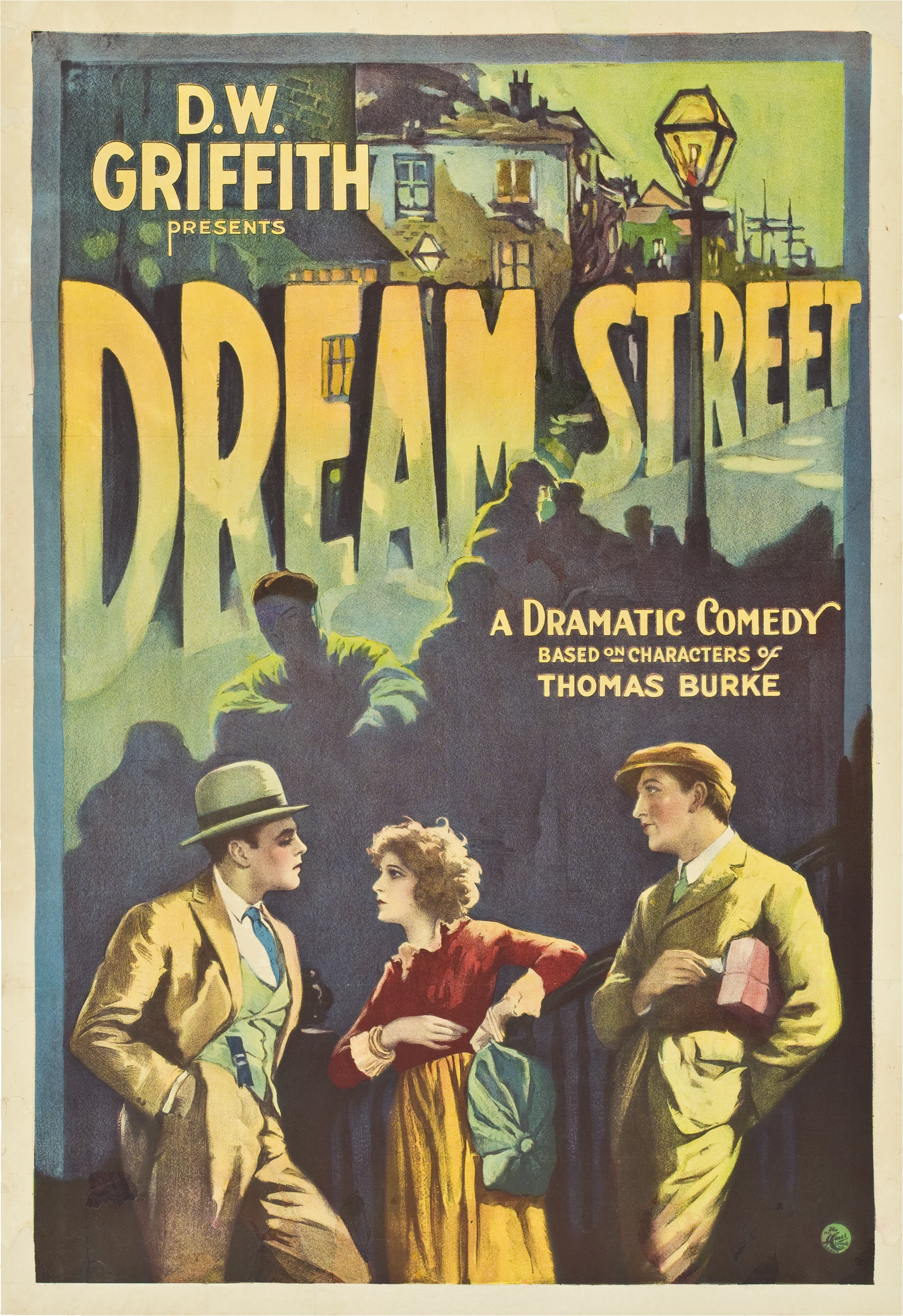
- Directed by: D. W. Griffith
- Written by: Roy Sinclair
- Based on: "Gina of the Chinatown" and "The Sign of the Lamp" by Thomas Burke
- Starring: Carol Dempster; Charles Emmett Mack; Ralph Graves; Tyrone Power Sr.
- Narrated by: D. W. Griffith
- Cinematography: Henrik Sartov
- Edited by: James Smith
- Music by: Louis Silvers; Irving Berlin
- Distributed by: United Artists
- Release date: April 12, 1921
- Running time: 135 minutes (original film length 10,100 feet)
- Country: United States
- Languages: Silent (with sound sequences); English intertitles
- Budget: $337,000
- Box office: $950,000

Dream Street is a 1921 American silent romantic drama film directed by D. W. Griffith, and starring Carol Dempster, Charles Emmett Mack, and Ralph Graves in a story about a love triangle set in London, and based on two short stories by Thomas Burke, "Gina of the Chinatown" and "The Sign of the Lamp". The cast also features Tyrone Power Sr.

The film, released by United Artists, was poorly received in its day, and critics still consider it one of Griffith's worst films.

== Plot ==
As described in a film magazine review, Gypsy Fair, a young dancer, is forced through circumstances to live in the London Limehouse district and associate with the other residents there. Through her courage and loyalty, she is forced into numerous hazardous situations from all of which she emerges unharmed. Finally, she marries the man she has reformed and finds true happiness with him.

== Cast ==
PLAY film; runtime 02:14:54

- Carol Dempster as Gypsy Fair
- Charles Emmett Mack as Billy McFadden (Billed as Charles Mack)
- Ralph Graves as James Spike McFadden
- Edward Peil Sr. as Swan Way
- Tyrone Power Sr. as street preacher
- Morgan Wallace as masked violinist
- William J. Ferguson as gypsy's father
- George Neville as Tom Chudder
- Charles Slattery as police inspector
- Porter Strong as Samuel Jones

== Premiere ==
The original 1921 version of Dream Street is notable for a brief sequence when D. W. Griffith steps out in front of a curtain at the beginning of the movie, and talks to the audience about the film, using Photokinema, an early sound-on-disc process developed by Orlando Kellum. Some films made in the Photokinema process, including Griffith's Dream Street introduction at the beginning, are preserved at the UCLA Film and Television Archive.

The silent version premiered on April 12, 1921, at the Central Theatre in New York City. On April 27, Griffith and Ralph Graves recorded their respective sound segments at Orlando Kellum's Photokinema office at 203 West 40th Street.

The premiere engagement of the sound version of Dream Street took place on May 2, 1921, at Town Hall in New York City, with Griffith's introduction. The film reopened on May 15, now also with two other short sound sequences — Ralph Graves singing a love song, and background noise in a scene showing a craps game. No other theaters could show the sound version of the film, for no other theaters had the Photokinema sound system installed.

On Sunday, May 29, Dream Street opened at the Shubert Crescent Theater in Brooklyn with a program of short films made in Phonokinema. However, business was poor, and the program soon closed.

== Reception ==
Leonard Maltin's Movie Guide describes the film as "disappointing", owing to Dempster and her performance. The Encyclopedia of Horror Movies, the first edition of The Aurum Film Encyclopedia: Horror, includes an appendix of Critics' Top Tens. In a supplementary paragraph to his list, Richard Combs includes Dream Street as an example of a horrific (in terms of "mood and rationale") film that belongs to a genre other than horror, describing it as "what passes for a Christian allegory of Good and Evil."
