= Scandal Street (1925 film) =

1925 film

- Directed by: Whitman Bennett
- Written by: Frank R. Adams
- Produced by: Whitman Bennett
- Starring: Niles Welch; Madge Kennedy; Edwin August
- Cinematography: Edward Paul
- Production company: Arrow Film Corporation
- Distributed by: Arrow Film Corporation
- Release date: January 9, 1925
- Running time: 70 minutes
- Country: United States
- Languages: Silent; English intertitles

Scandal Street is a 1925 American silent drama film directed by Whitman Bennett and starring Niles Welch, Madge Kennedy, and Edwin August.

== Premise ==
When a film star is killed in a car crash during the shooting of his latest pictures, the producers replace him with a near identical man and try to pretend he is still alive.

== Cast ==
- Niles Welch as Neil Keenly / Harrison Halliday
- Madge Kennedy as Sheila Kane
- Edwin August as Howard Manning
- Coit Albertson as Julian Lewis
- Louise Carter as Cora Forman
- J. Moy Bennett as Pat O'Malley

== Bibliography ==
- Munden, Kenneth White. The American Film Institute Catalog of Motion Pictures Produced in the United States, Part 1. University of California Press, 1997.
