= Whitman Bennett =

American film producer and director

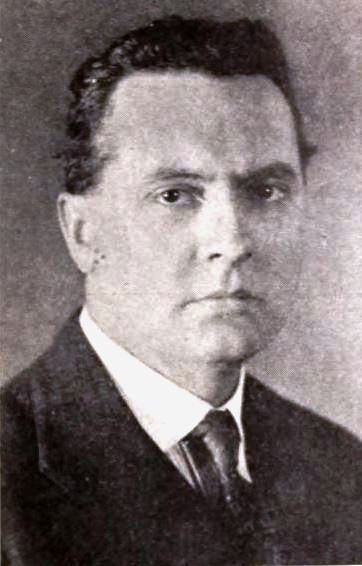
- Born: December 30, 1883; Cambridge, Massachusetts, United States
- Died: April 17, 1968 (aged 84); New York City, United States
- Occupations: Producer, Director
- Years active: 1920–1925 (film)

Whitman Bennett (December 30, 1883 – April 17, 1968) was an American film producer and director of the silent era.

== Selected filmography ==
- The Truth About Husbands (1920)
- The Devil's Garden (1920)
- The Master Mind (1920)
- Salvation Nell (1921)
- Wife Against Wife (1921)
- The Iron Trail (1921)
- Not Guilty (1921)
- The Great Adventure (1921)
- Jim the Penman (1921)
- The Darling of the Rich (1922)
- The Secrets of Paris (1922)
- How Women Love (1922)
- Fair Lady (1922)
- Modern Marriage (1923)
- Loyal Lives (1923)
- The Leavenworth Case (1923)
- Love of Women (1924)
- Virtuous Liars (1924)
- Two Shall Be Born (1924)
- The Hoosier Schoolmaster (1924)
- Back to Life (1925)
- Children of the Whirlwind (1925)
- Share and Share Alike (1925)
- Lena Rivers (1925)
- A Man of Iron (1925)
- Scandal Street (1925)

== Bibliography ==
- Munden, Kenneth White. The American Film Institute Catalog of Motion Pictures Produced in the United States, Part 1. University of California Press, 1997.
