= The Show Girl =

1927 film

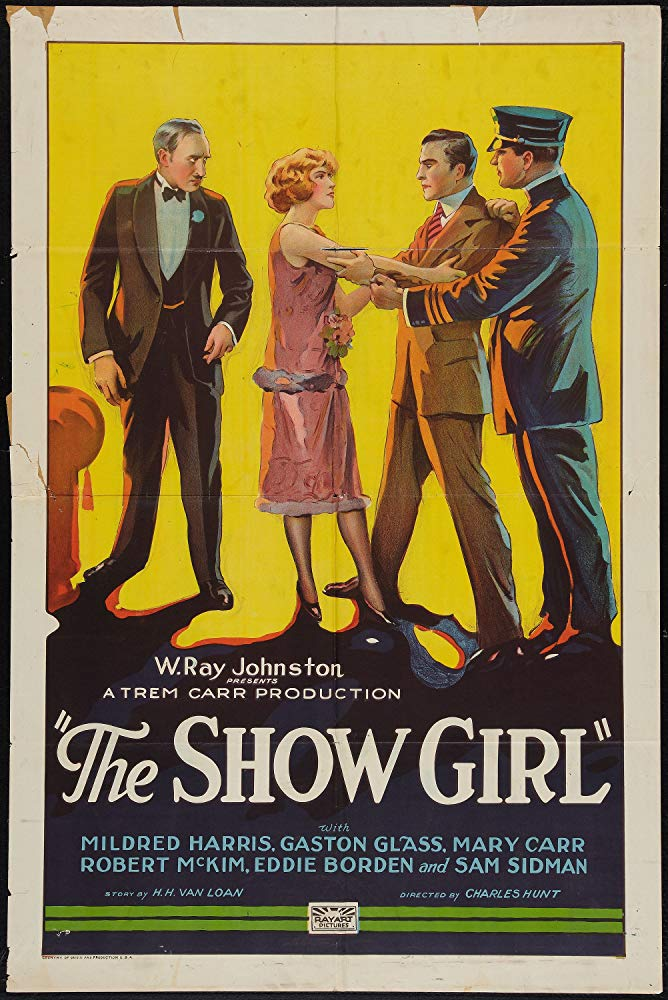
- Directed by: Charles J. Hunt
- Written by: H.H. Van Loan
- Produced by: Trem Carr; W. Ray Johnston
- Starring: Mildred Harris; Gaston Glass; Mary Carr
- Production company: Trem Carr Pictures
- Distributed by: Rayart Pictures
- Release date: January 21, 1927
- Running time: 60 minutes
- Country: United States
- Languages: Silent; English intertitles

The Show Girl is a 1927 American silent drama film directed by Charles J. Hunt and starring Mildred Harris, Gaston Glass and Mary Carr.

== Cast ==
- Mildred Harris as Maizie Udell
- Gaston Glass as Billy Barton
- Mary Carr as Mrs. Udell
- Robert McKim as Edward Hayden
- Eddie Borden as 'Breezy' Ayres
- William H. Strauss as Moe Kenner
- Sam Sidman as Heinie
- Aryel Darma as Alma Dakin

== Preservation ==
This film (not to be confused with a 1928 Alice White film of same title) survives at the Library of Congress, Museum of Modern Art (MOMA) and the UCLA Film & Television Archive.

== Bibliography ==
- Munden, Kenneth White. The American Film Institute Catalog of Motion Pictures Produced in the United States, Part 1. University of California Press, 1997.
