= The Truth About Husbands =

1920 US film directed by Kenneth Webb

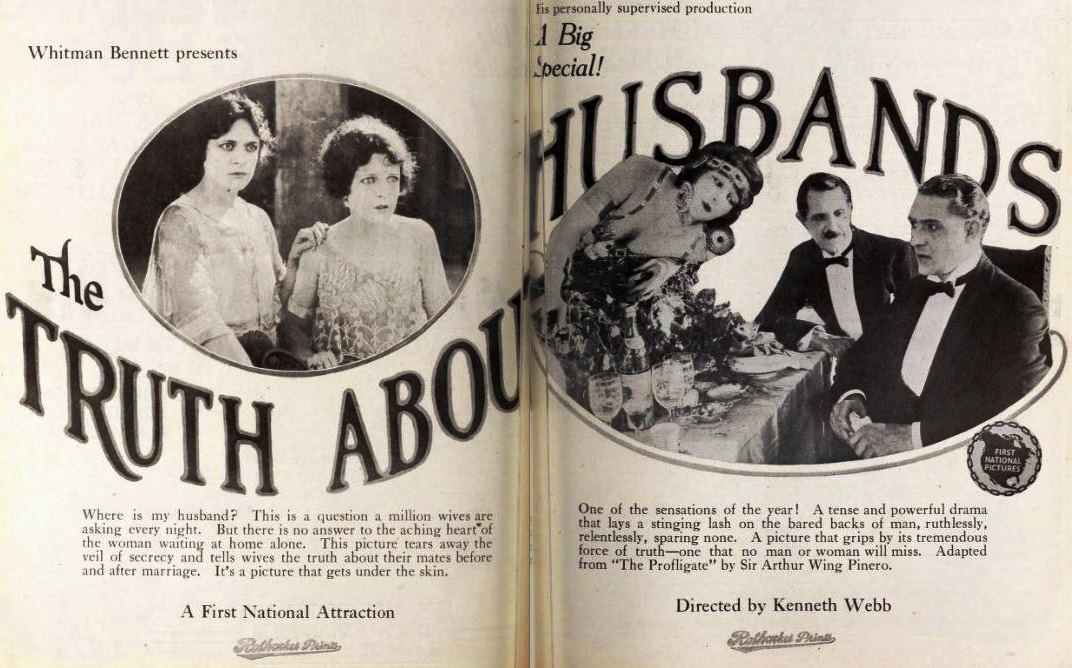
- Directed by: Kenneth Webb
- Written by: Violet Clark
- Based on: the play, The Profligate by Arthur Wing Pinero
- Produced by: Whitman Bennett
- Starring: Anna Lehr; Holmes Herbert; Elizabeth Garrison
- Production company: Whitman Bennett Productions
- Distributed by: Associated First National Pictures
- Release date: December 1920 (US)
- Running time: 5 reels
- Country: United States
- Language: Silent (English intertitles)

The Truth About Husbands is a 1920 American silent drama film directed by Kenneth Webb and starring Anna Lehr, Holmes Herbert, and Elizabeth Garrison. It was released in December 1920. Prints of The Truth About Husbands exist in the Library of Congress film archive and in the film holdings of the Wisconsin Center for Film and Theater Research.

== Cast ==
- Anna Lehr as Janet Preece
- Holmes Herbert as Dustan Renshaw
- Elizabeth Garrison as Mrs. Stonehay
- May McAvoy as Leslie Brownell
- Richard Gordon as Hugh Murray
- Ivo Dawson as Lord Randolph
- Arthur Rankin as Wilfred Brownell
- Lorraine Frost as Irene Stoney

== Controversy ==
In 1916, there were protests to showing this film by men of Pine City, Minnesota, which was booked at their local cinema, Family Theatre. They viewed it as too controversial.
