= The Master Mind (1920 film) =

1920 film by Kenneth Webb

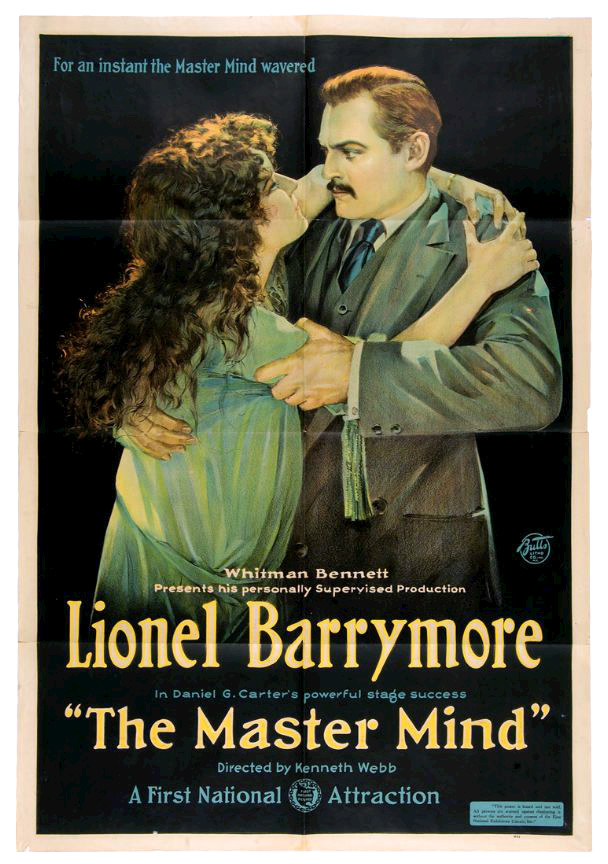
- Film poster
- Directed by: Kenneth Webb
- Written by: Kenneth Webb (scenario)
- Based on: The Master Mind by Daniel David Cohen
- Produced by: Whitman Bennett
- Cinematography: Tom L. Griffith; Rial Schellinger
- Distributed by: Associated First National Pictures
- Release date: September 12, 1920
- Running time: 50 minutes; 5 reels
- Country: United States
- Language: Silent (English intertitles)

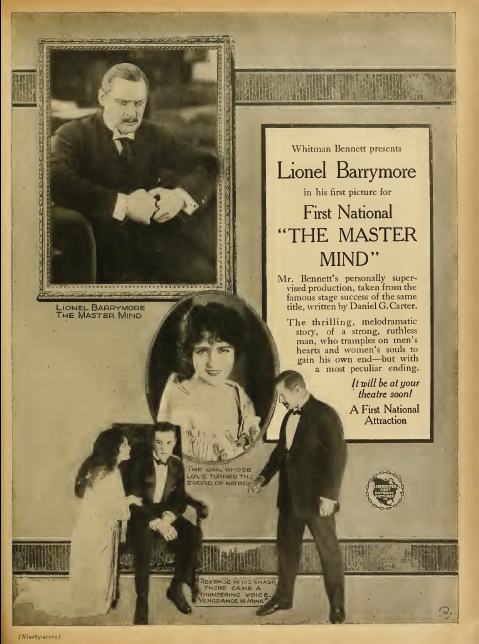
First National advertisement.

The Master Mind (also known as Sinners Three) is a lost 1920 American silent crime drama film produced by Whitman Bennett and released by Associated First National Pictures, later just First National Pictures). Kenneth Webb directed and Lionel Barrymore stars. It is based on a 1913 play, The Master Mind, by playwright Daniel David Cohen also known as Daniel D. Carter.

== Plot ==
As described in a film magazine, in revenge for the successful prosecution of his younger brother Richard, accused of murder but innocent, by district attorney Wainwright, Henry Allen, whose two passions are the study of psychology and his love for his brother, schemes to return the hurt to the lawyer and take away that which he holds dear. Finding that Wainwright loves a portrait of a young woman with a criminal record, Henry develops a scheme that takes Maggie from prison and educates her abroad. Upon completion of her education he surrounds her with a pretending family, presumably to cover up her past, and brings her and the lawyer together and permits them to marry. With Wainwright running for governor, Henry goes to him and reveals the past of the Maggie and the criminal record of her family, intending to force Wainwright on threat of public exposure to withdraw from the election. Before this threat can be made effective, Maggie appeals to Henry, and he has a change of heart, realizing that vengeance is not man meted but God-visited. Henry leaves the loving couple to fame and happiness.

== Cast ==
- Lionel Barrymore as Henry Allen
- Gypsy O'Brien as Maggie
- Ralph Kellard as Wainwright
- Bradley Barker as Creegan
- Charles Brandt as Hank
- Marie Shotwell as Sadie
- Bernard Randall as Diamond Willie
- Charles Edwards as The Butler
- Louis Stern
- Alma Aiken
- Percy Helton as Younger brother Richard
