= The Daring Years =

1923 film by Kenneth Webb

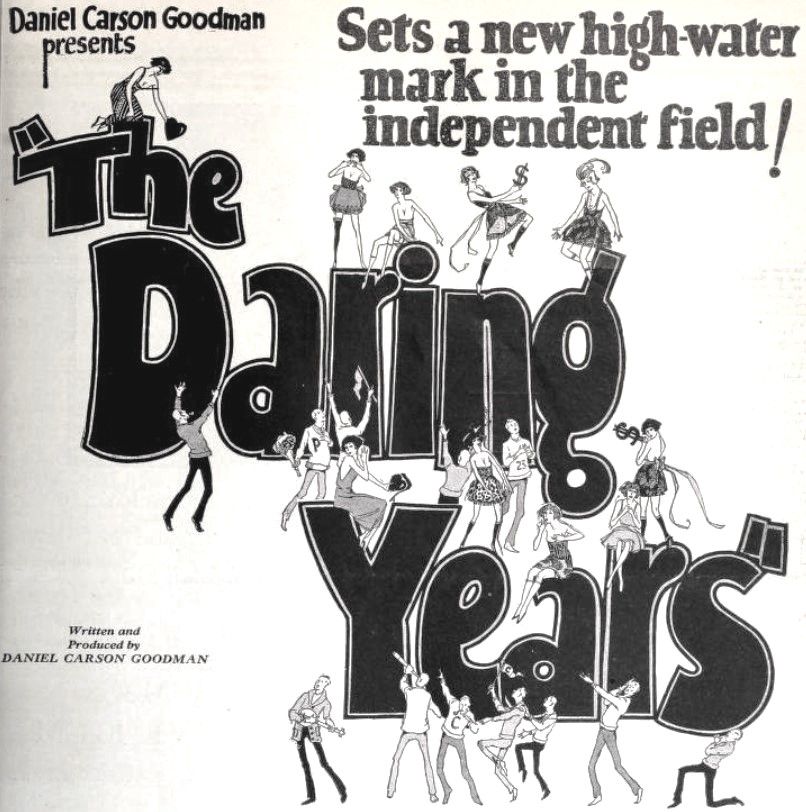
- Advertisement
- Directed by: Kenneth Webb
- Written by: Daniel Carson Goodman
- Produced by: Daniel Carson Goodman
- Starring: Mildred Harris; Charles Emmett Mack; Clara Bow; Tyrone Power Sr.
- Distributed by: Equity Pictures Corporation
- Release date: September 12, 1923
- Running time: 70 mins.
- Country: United States
- Language: Silent (English intertitles)

The Daring Years is 1923 American silent melodrama film directed by Kenneth Webb and produced by Daniel Carson Goodman. The film starred Mildred Harris, Clara Bow, Charles Emmett Mack, and Tyrone Power Sr.

== Plot ==
A university student named John Browning goes against his mother's wishes and becomes involved in a torrid love-affair with a fickle young cabaret singer named Susie LaMotte. LaMotte toys with the youth's affections and does not tell him that she is already romantically involved with a boxer named Jim Moran.

One evening John Browning discovers that Susie and Moran are having a relationship when he accidentally walks in on them. Outraged, Browning and Moran become embroiled in an argument. Moran pulls out a pistol, but during the ensuing struggle accidentally mortally wounds himself. Overcome with rage, Susie blames John Browning for Moran's death and Browning is subsequently tried, convicted and sentenced to death.

Browning languishes in prison for some time, and just as he is strapped into the electric chair to be executed for the murder of Jim Moran, a bolt of lightning strikes the prison knocking out the power. Meanwhile, Moran's widow implores Susie to tell the authorities the truth surrounding the circumstances of the death of Jim Moran. Susie eventually folds and confesses that she had lied and that Jim Moran had in fact accidentally shot himself after pulling a gun on John Browning.

John is pardoned by the governor and leaves prison a free man.

== Cast ==
- Mildred Harris as Susie LaMotte
- Charles Emmett Mack as John Browning
- Clara Bow as Mary
- Mary Carr as Mrs. Browning (John's mother)
- Joe King as Jim Moran
- Tyrone Power Sr. as James LaMotte (Susie's father)
- Richard "Skeets" Gallagher as College boy
- Jack Richardson as Flagier, cabaret owner
- Joseph Depew as LaMotte brother
- Helen Rowland as LaMotte sister
- Sam Sidman as Curly

== Preservation ==
With no prints of The Daring Years located in any film archives, it is a lost film.

== See also ==
- List of lost films
