= Fair Lady (film) =

1922 film by Kenneth Webb

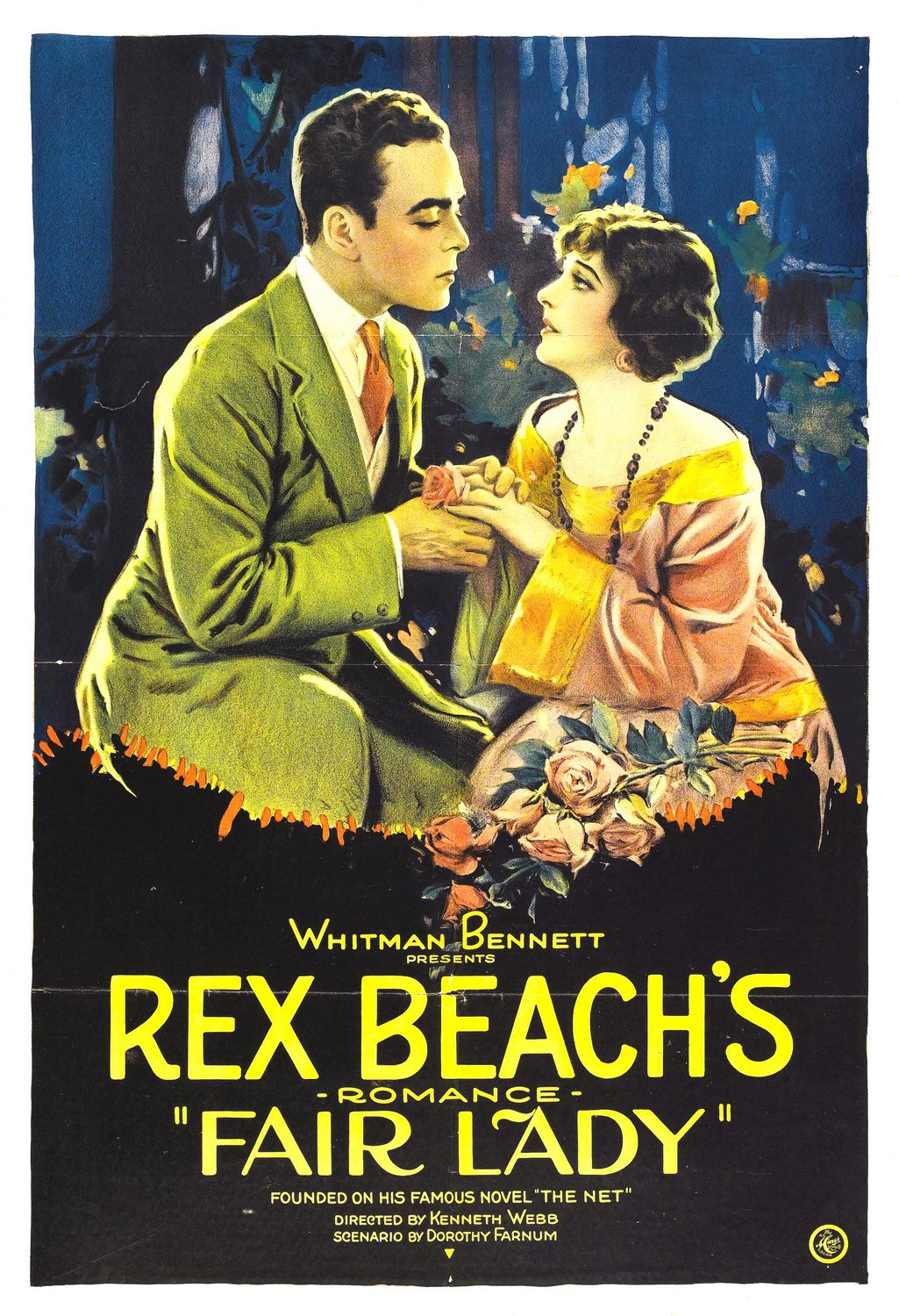
- Theatrical release poster
- Directed by: Kenneth Webb
- Written by: Dorothy Farnum (scenario)
- Based on: The Net by Rex Beach
- Produced by: Whitman Bennett
- Starring: Betty Blythe; Thurston Hall; Robert Elliott
- Cinematography: Harry Stradling; Edward Paul
- Distributed by: United Artists
- Release date: March 19, 1922
- Running time: 70 minutes, 7 reels (6,400 feet)
- Country: United States
- Language: Silent (English intertitles)

Fair Lady is a 1922 American silent drama film directed by Kenneth Webb. The film stars Betty Blythe, Thurston Hall and Robert Elliott. The film was based on the novel The Net by Rex Beach. It is not known whether the film currently survives.

== Plot ==
In Sicily, Count Martinello is assassinated by Cardi and his mafia group on what would have been his wedding day. His bride to be, Countess Margherita, gets word of this from American Norvin Blake, who fails to protect her from Cardi, who wants her for his own. Later, Margherita and Norvin meet in New Orleans, where he declares his love for her.

Recognizing Gian Norcone as the group leader who killed the count, Norvin has him arrested after getting into a fight with him. Caesar Maruffi, a supposed friend and admirer who suits Margherita, is discovered to be Cardi. In the middle of a fight between Cardi and Norvin, Cardi is stabbed by Lucrezia, Margherita's maid. In the end, Norvin finally wins Margherita.

== Cast ==
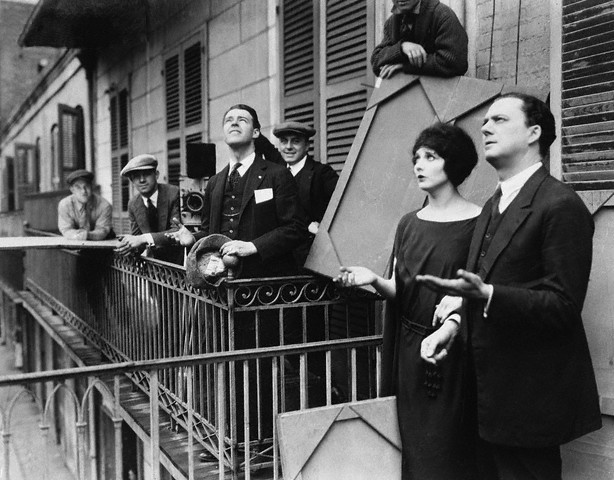
On location in New Orleans: Kenneth Webb, (director, center), Betty Blythe, Robert Elliott, (extreme right)

- Betty Blythe as Countess Margherita
- Thurston Hall as Italian banker Caesar Maruffi / Cardi
- Robert Elliott as Norvin Blake
- Gladys Hulette as Myra Nell Drew
- Florence Auer as Lucrezia
- Walter James as Gian Norcone
- Macey Harlam as Count Modene
- Henry Leone as Ricardo
- Effingham Pinto as Count Martinello
- Arnold Lucy as Uncle Bernie Drew
