= Mary Thurman =

American silent film actress (1895–1925)

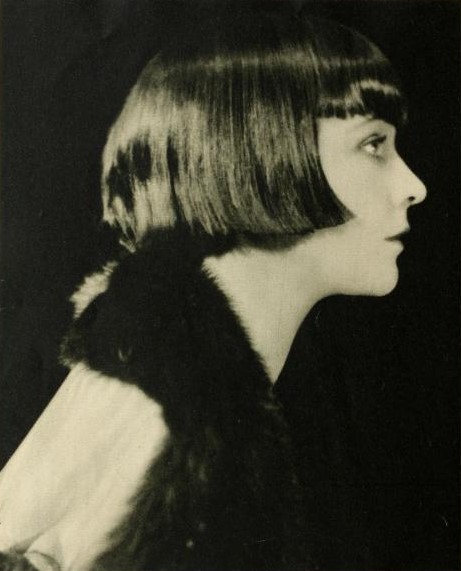
- Thurman in 1924
- Born: Mary Christiansen; April 27, 1895; Richfield, Utah, U.S.
- Died: December 22, 1925 (aged 30); New York City, U.S.
- Resting place: Richfield City Cemetery
- Education: University of Utah
- Occupations: Actress, model
- Years active: 1915–1925
- Spouse: Victor E. Thurman (m. 1915; div. 1919)

Mary Thurman (née Christiansen; April 27, 1895 – December 22, 1925) was an American actress of the silent film era.

== Early life ==
Mary Christiansen was born in Richfield, Utah on April 27, 1895, one of seven children raised in the Church of Jesus Christ of Latter-day Saints. Her parents were Christian Christiansen and Mary Sophia Nielsen Christiansen, who were both Danish, her father having been born in Denmark.

She attended the University of Utah and became a teacher before turning to acting.

Thurman married Victor E. Thurman, son of Utah Supreme Court justice Samuel R. Thurman, in 1915. They divorced in 1919.

== Career ==
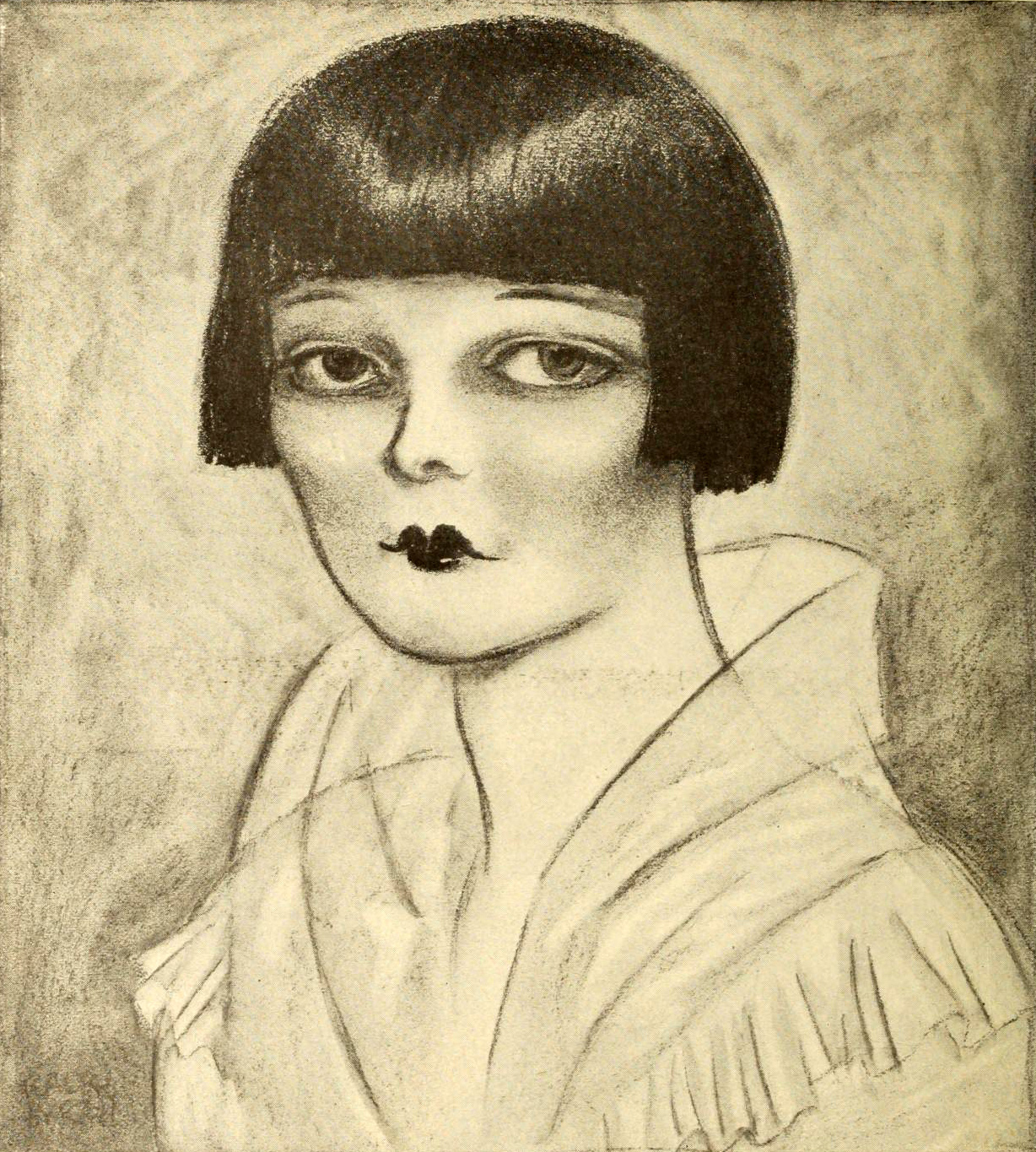
Portrait of Thurman by Ralph Barton. This drawing shows the Dutch bob hairstyle she adopted in 1920, making her the first celebrity with the style that became a craze among young fashionable women known as "flappers" during the 1920s and early 1930s.

Thurman's film career began with roles in the comedies of Mack Sennett, as one of the Sennett Bathing Beauties, and featured appearances in Bombs! (1916) and The Fool (1925). Her greatest success came when she started working with director Allan Dwan. They collaborated on several critically acclaimed films including The Sin of Martha Queed (1921) and A Broken Doll (1921). In Dwan's still extant 1923 film Zaza Thurman is the actress Gloria Swanson fights with. Off screen Thurman and Dwan were engaged for several years. She appeared in nearly sixty Hollywood films from 1915 up until her death in 1925, frequently in those made by Pathé Studios.

== Death ==
In 1924 while working on the film Down Upon the Suwanee River in Florida, she came down with a serious case of pneumonia. She suffered from the illness and was hospitalized for nearly a year. Thurman died of pneumonia in New York City on December 22, 1925, in Flower Hospital. Her best friend, actress Juanita Hansen, was at her side when she died. She was buried in Richfield City Cemetery in her hometown of Richfield, Utah.

== Selected filmography ==
- The Lamb (1915)
- Watch Your Neighbor (1918)
- The Poor Boob (1919)
- This Hero Stuff (1919)
- Spotlight Sadie (1919)
- The Prince and Betty (1919)
- The Scoffer (1920)
- Sand! (1920)
- The Valley of Tomorrow (1920)
- In the Heart of a Fool (1920)
- Leap Year (1921)
- Bare Knuckles (1921)
- A Broken Doll (1921)
- The Lady from Longacre (1921)
- The Sin of Martha Queed (1921)
- The Green Temptation (1922)
- The Bond Boy (1922)
- Zaza (1923)
- The Tents of Allah (1923)
- Wife in Name Only (1923)
- Does It Pay? (1923)
- Those Who Judge (1924)
- The Truth About Women (1924)
- Trouping with Ellen (1924)
- The Law and the Lady (1924)
- Greater Than Marriage (1924)
- Love of Women (1924)
- For Another Woman (1924)
- Playthings of Desire (1924)
- The Mad Marriage (1925)
- Back to Life (1925)
- The Fool (1925)
- The Necessary Evil (1925)
- A Little Girl in a Big City (1925)
- Down Upon the Suwanee River (1925)
- The Wives of the Prophet (1926)
