= The First Auto =

1927 film by Roy Del Ruth

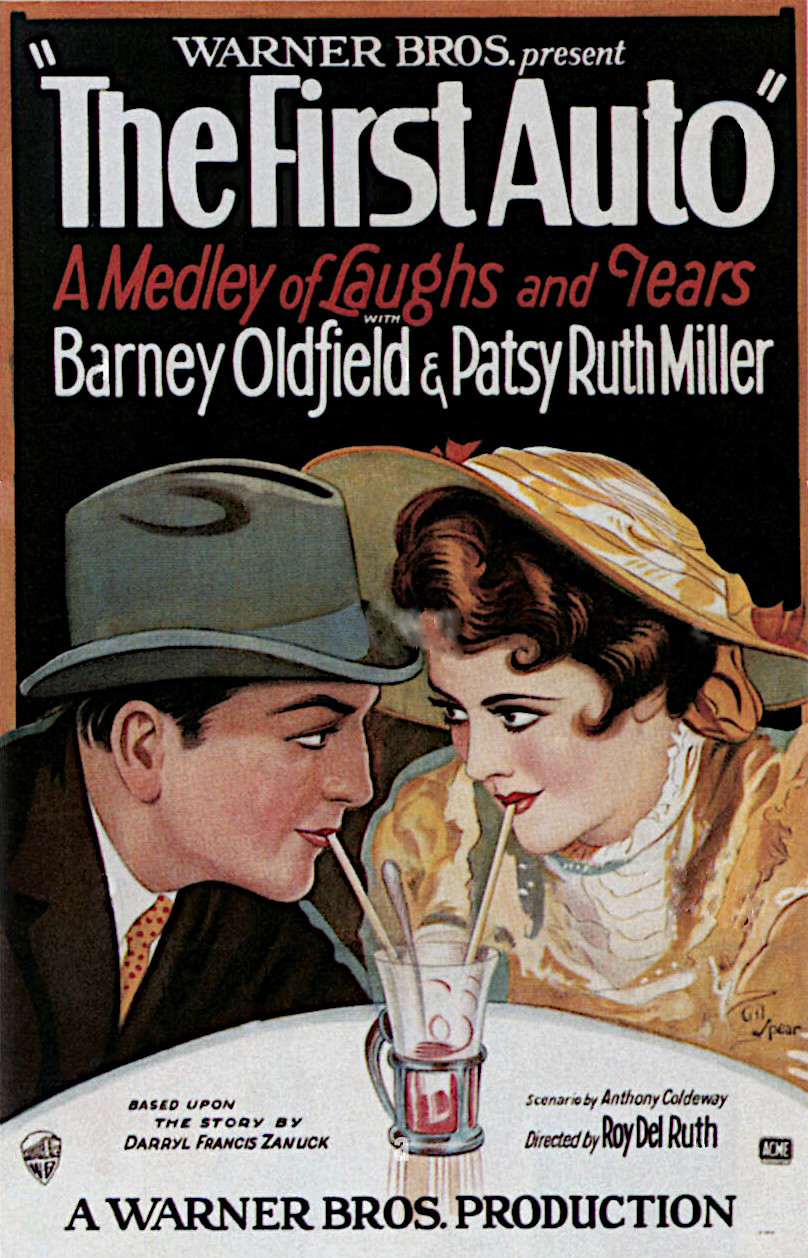
- Theatrical release poster
- Directed by: Roy Del Ruth
- Written by: Anthony Coldeway (scenario); Jack Jarmuth (titles)
- Story by: Darryl F. Zanuck
- Produced by: Darryl F. Zanuck
- Starring: Barney Oldfield; Patsy Ruth Miller
- Cinematography: David Abel
- Edited by: Martin Wall Bolger (uncredited)
- Music by: Herman S. Heller
- Production company: Warner Bros. Pictures
- Distributed by: Warner Bros. Pictures
- Release dates: June 27, 1927 (New York City); September 18, 1927 (US)
- Running time: 75 minutes
- Country: United States
- Languages: Sound (Synchronized) (English intertitles)

The First Auto (1927)

The First Auto is a 1927 American synchronized sound drama film directed by Roy Del Ruth about the transition from horses to cars and the rift it causes in one family. While the film has no audible dialog, it was released with a synchronized musical score with sound effects, some spoken words, cheering, and laughter, using the Vitaphone sound-on-disc process. The film stars Charles Emmett Mack and Patsy Ruth Miller, with Barney Oldfield having a guest role in the movie. As of January 1, 2023, the film is in the public domain.

== Plot ==
In 1895, champion horse racer and livery stable owner Hank Armstrong is greatly disturbed by the advent of the "horseless carriage" in Maple City. He mocks Elmer Hays, a car manufacturer, when he states in a public lecture that the days of the horse are numbered and that a car will one day go 30 miles an hour. However, Armstrong's efforts are in vain. He quarrels with his friends when they start purchasing the machines and is only stopped from horsewhipping his own car-mad son Bob by the timely appearance of Bob's girlfriend Rose Robbins.

Bob leaves to find a job in nearby Detroit. There, he is present when famed driver Barney Oldfield (playing himself) breaks the speed record, driving a mile in a minute. Meanwhile, Hank goes bankrupt and has to sell off all his possessions to satisfy his creditors.

One day in 1905, Bob returns, without telling his father, to compete in the first car race in the county. A jealous rival for Rose's affections convinces Hank to tamper with a car on display so that it will explode. When Bob sends Rose to bring his father to the race, Hank is horrified to discover he has sabotaged his son's car. They hurry to the track, but are too late. Bob's car crashes and burns. Hank is convinced he has killed Bob and burns down his livery stable, but Rose brings word that Bob is expected to live. Relieved, Hank gives up his hopeless resistance and joins his son in his car manufacturing company.

== Cast ==
- Barney Oldfield as himself - the Master Driver
- Patsy Ruth Miller as Rose Robbins
- Charles Emmett Mack as Bob Armstrong
- Russell Simpson as Hank Armstrong
- Frank Campeau as Mayor Jim Robbins
- William Demarest as Dave Doolittle, the village cut-up
- Paul Kruger as Steve Bentley
- Gibson Gowland as the blacksmith
- E. H. Calvert as Elmer Hays, the inventor
- Douglas Gerrard as Banker Stebbins, the richest man in town
- Anders Randolf as the auctioneer (uncredited)

== Production ==
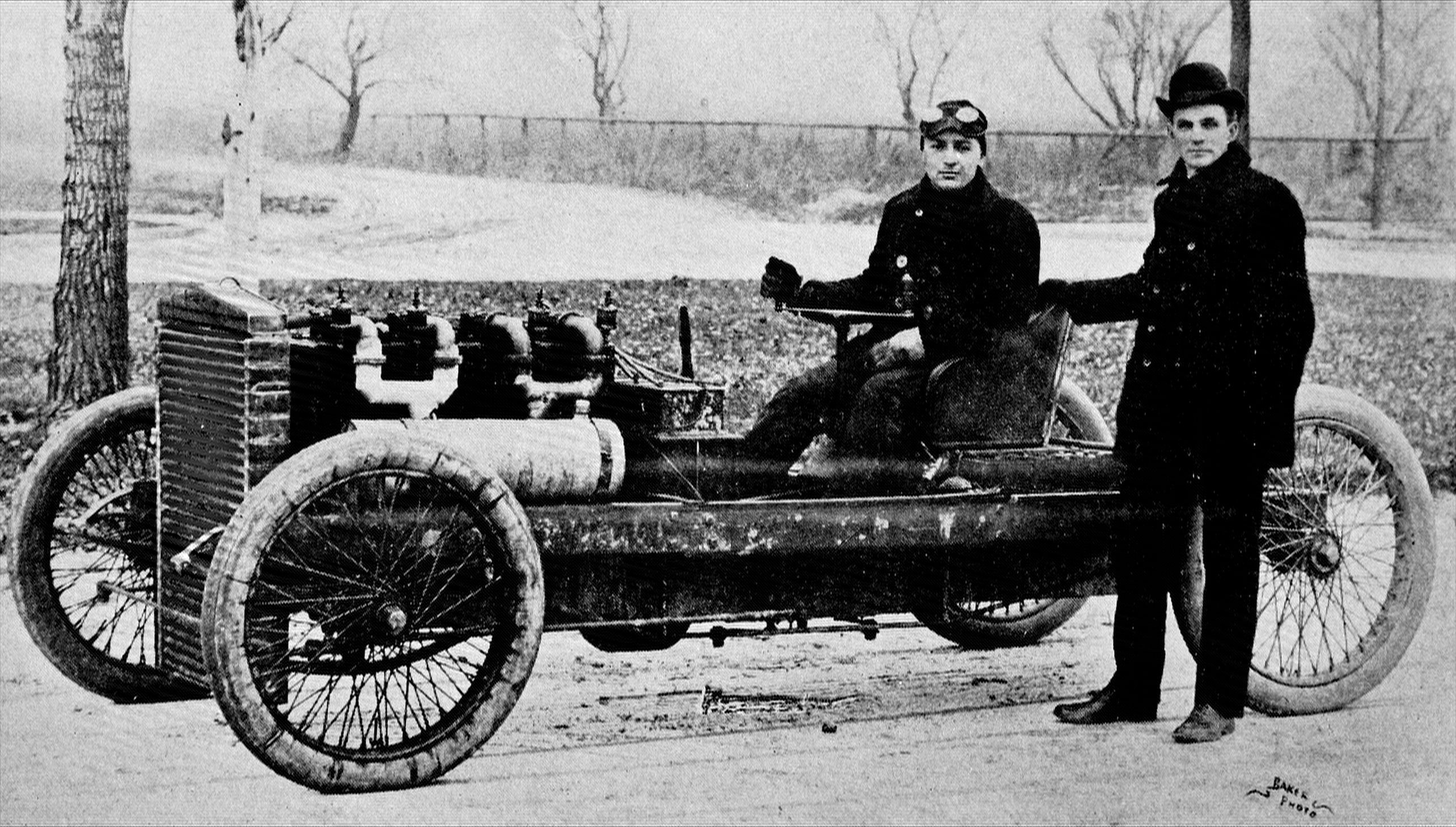
Barney Oldfield and Henry Ford with the 999 race car, shown on a postcard in the film.

To ensure authenticity and provide a measure of safety in the racing scenes for The First Auto, race car driver Barney Oldfield was hired as a technical coordinator. Oldfield, the first to reach a speed of 60 mph (97 km/h), in 1903, also was given a small role in the film.

Mack was killed in an accident while driving to work, prior to the end of filming. According to Robert Osborne of Turner Classic Movies, his car was struck broadside by a wagon on a country road. His co-star Patsy Ruth Miller had turned down a ride with him that day because she was not needed for filming until later. The last scene shows Hank at a car race, while Bob and Rose are away (off-screen) at a horse show.

== Reception ==
The New York Times reviewer, Mordaunt Hall characterized The First Auto as "... packed with sentiment, but it is nevertheless a good entertainment." He noted that Oldfield was driving a famous race car, Henry Ford's 999.

== See also ==
- List of early sound feature films (1926–1929)
- List of early Warner Bros. sound and talking features
