= Share and Share Alike (film) =

1925 film

- Directed by: Whitman Bennett
- Written by: Reginald Wright Kauffman
- Produced by: Whitman Bennett
- Starring: Jane Novak; James Rennie; Henry Sands
- Cinematography: Harry Stradling Sr.
- Production company: Whitman Bennett Productions
- Distributed by: Arrow Film Corporation
- Release date: January 9, 1925
- Running time: 70 minutes
- Country: United States
- Languages: Silent; English intertitles

Share and Share Alike is a 1925 American silent drama film directed by Whitman Bennett and starring Jane Novak, James Rennie and Henry Sands.

== Cast ==
- Jane Novak as Marcia Maynard
- James Rennie as Sam Jefford
- Henry Sands as Titus
- Cortland Van Deusen as Banjamin Maynard
- Frank Conlan as Duncan
- Joseph Burke as Le Blanc
- Bernard Randall as Alfonse
- Mario Majeroni as Sick Man
- Henri Myrial as Mark, Opie

== Bibliography ==
- Koszarski, Richard. Hollywood on the Hudson: Film and Television in New York from Griffith to Sarnoff. Rutgers University Press, 2008.
