= Sam Sidman =

American actor

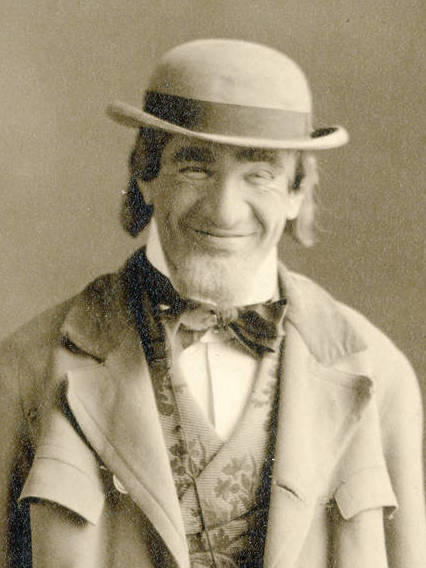
Sam Sidman

Sam Sidman (1871 – 3 January 1948) was an American actor. Born in the Austro-Hungarian Empire, he appeared in films such as The Daring Years (a lost film released in 1923), The Show Girl (1927), and Better Days (1927). Sidman was also a well-known comedian, imitated by Eddie Cantor for example.

At the time of his death in Pinewald, New Jersey, he was a resident of the Actors' Fund home in Englewood, New Jersey.

== Selected filmography ==
- The Show Girl (1927)
