= Bare Knuckles (1921 film) =

1921 film

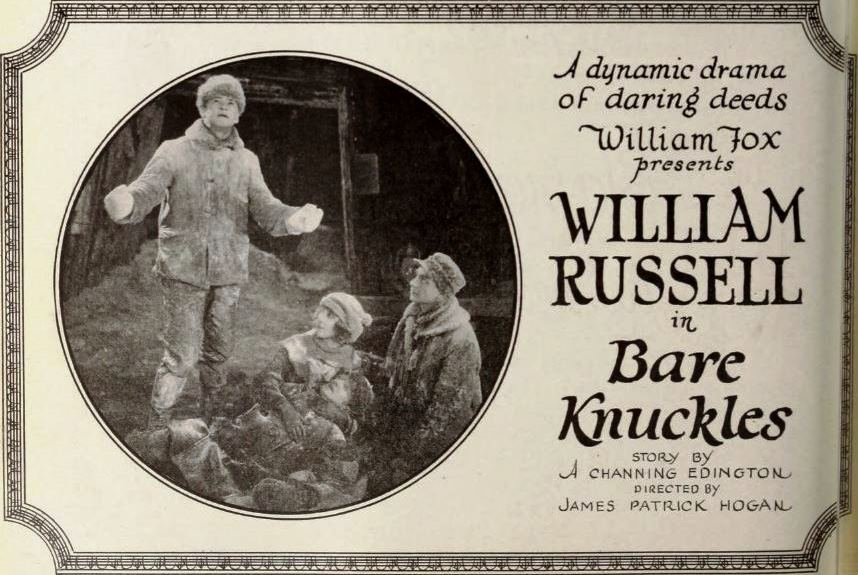
- Directed by: James P. Hogan
- Written by: A. Channing Edington; James P. Hogan
- Produced by: William Fox
- Starring: William Russell; Mary Thurman; George Fisher
- Cinematography: George Schneiderman
- Production company: Fox Film Corporation
- Distributed by: Fox Film Corporation
- Release date: March 20, 1921
- Running time: 50 minutes
- Country: United States
- Languages: Silent; English intertitles

Bare Knuckles is a 1921 American silent drama film directed by James P. Hogan and starring William Russell, Mary Thurman and George Fisher.

== Cast ==
- William Russell as Tim McGuire
- Mary Thurman as Lorraine Metcalf
- Correan Kirkham as Fern
- George Fisher as Haines
- Edwin B. Tilton as Benham
- Charles Gorman as Lweek
- Jack Roseleigh a Harris
- John Cook as Old Soaky
- Joe Lee as Abie
- Charles K. French as Metcalf
- Jack Stevens as Shadow

== Bibliography ==
- Connelly, Robert B. The Silents: Silent Feature Films, 1910-36, Volume 40, Issue 2. December Press, 1998.
- Munden, Kenneth White. The American Film Institute Catalog of Motion Pictures Produced in the United States, Part 1. University of California Press, 1997.
