= Charles Lawrence Young =

Sir Charles Lawrence Young, 7th Baronet (31 October 1839 – 11 September 1887) was an English playwright, barrister, and baronet.

== Life and career ==
Young was the son of Sir William Young Bt MP. He was educated at Cheltenham College and New College, Oxford, graduating BA in 1862. He entered the Inner Temple in 1862, and was called to the bar in 1865.

As a playwright his best known and most successful work was Jim the Penman (1866); a play young based on a real master criminal, James Townshend Saward, who had success as a forger. The play had successful stagings at the Theatre Royal Haymarket in London and on Broadway at the Madison Square Theatre. The play was adapted into the silent films Jim the Penman (1915, Paramount Pictures) and Jim the Penman (1921, First National Pictures). A photograph taken of him by Camille Silvy is in the collection of the National Portrait Gallery.

Young died in Hatfield Peverel Priory, Essex on 11 September 1887.
