= The Light of Happiness =

1916 film by John H. Collins

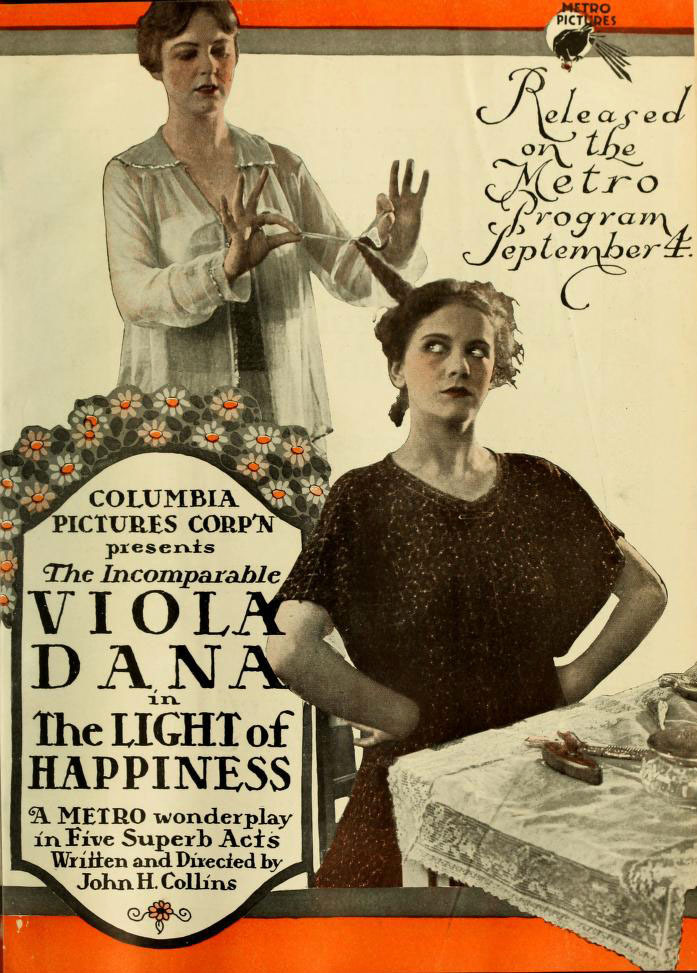
- lobby poster
- Directed by: John H. Collins
- Written by: John Collins
- Produced by: Columbia Pictures Corporation
- Starring: Viola Dana
- Cinematography: H. O. Carleton
- Distributed by: Metro Pictures
- Release date: September 4, 1916
- Running time: 5 reels
- Country: USA
- Language: Silent

The Light of Happiness is a lost 1916 silent film drama directed by John H. Collins and starring Viola Dana.

The film follows Tangletop, a social outcast with an alcoholic father. Emmett Dwight and Tangletop enter into a plan to deceive the blind and wealthy Lowell Van Orden, but Tangletop changes her mind after meeting Reverend Clyde Harmon. She comes clean to Van Orden and ultimately marries Harmon.

== Cast ==
- Viola Dana - Tangletop
- George Melville - Henry Mullins, her father
- Lorraine Frost - Mollie Dean
- Harry Linsen - Myron Dean
- Edward Earle - Lowell Van Orden
- Jack Busby - Emmett Dwight
- Mona Kingsley - Madeline Dwight
- Robert Walker - Reverend Clyde Harmon
- Charles Boone -
- Mrs. Wallace Erskine
