= Jim the Penman (1915 film) =

1915 film by Edwin Stanton Porter

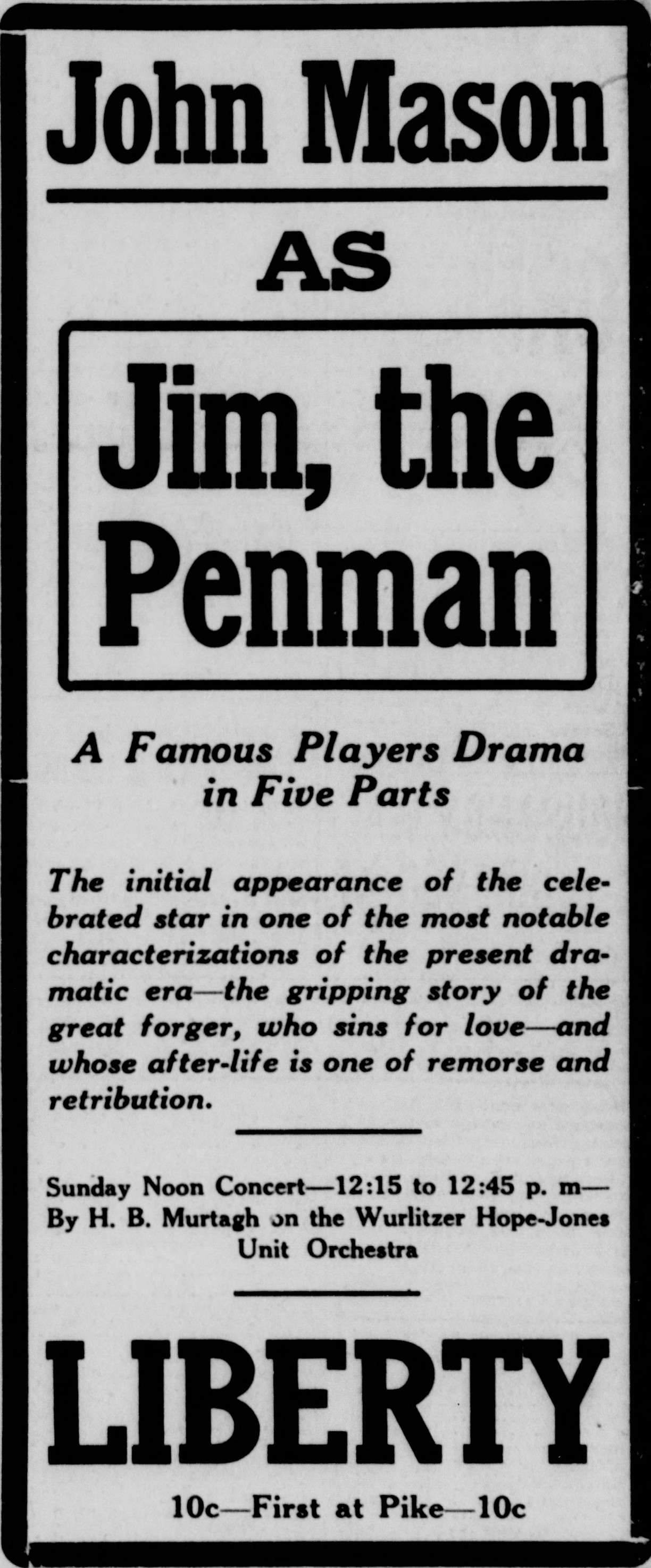
- Newspaper advertisement
- Directed by: Edwin S. Porter
- Produced by: Adolph Zukor
- Starring: John B. Mason; Harold Lockwood
- Cinematography: Edwin S. Porter; William Waddell
- Distributed by: Paramount Pictures
- Release date: June 3, 1915
- Running time: 5 reels
- Country: United States
- Language: Silent film (English intertitles)

Jim the Penman is a 1915 silent film crime drama produced by the Famous Players Film Company and released through Paramount Pictures. It was the first movie based on a well-known stage play, Jim the Penman by Charles Lawrence Young, about a forger in Victorian Britain. The film was directed by Edwin S. Porter and starred stage actor John B. Mason in his debut film, in line with Adolph Zukor's efforts to recruit famous stage actors for films. Mason had played the part on the stage in the 1910 season on Broadway. Co-starring with Mason was the young up-and-coming favorite Harold Lockwood.

Some sources erroneously credit this film as being shot in a stereoscopic format, but it was in fact shot in the conventional 2D format. Stereoscopic tests films were shot by Porter (not for use in the film) using the sets and actors. This film is lost.

== Plot ==
Louis Percival uses his forgery talent to woo Nina. He saves her father from bankruptcy by forging a check, but gets caught. Percival is then blackmailed to use his forgery skills to help the shady character who caught him.

== Cast ==
- Harold Lockwood as Louis Percival
- John B. Mason as James Ralston
- Russell Bassett as Baron Hartfield
- Frederick Perry as Captain Redwood
- William Roselle as Lord Drelincourt
- Marguerite Leslie as Nina L'Estrange

== See also ==
- Jim the Penman (1921 film)
