= Jim the Penman (1921 film) =

1921 film by Kenneth Webb

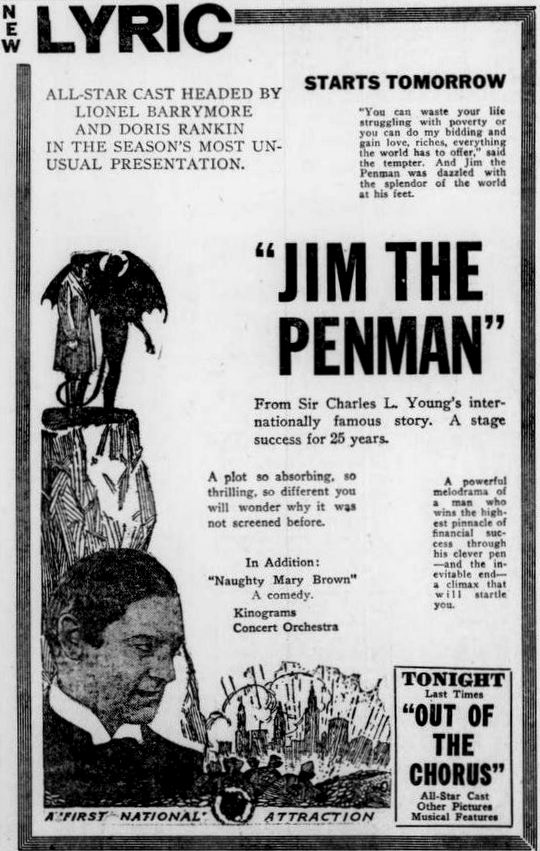
- Newspaper ad
- Directed by: Kenneth Webb
- Written by: Dorothy Farnum (scenario)
- Based on: Jim the Penman (play) by Charles Lawrence Young
- Produced by: Whitman Bennett
- Starring: Lionel Barrymore
- Cinematography: Tom L. Griffith; Harry Stradling
- Distributed by: Associated First National (*later First National Pictures)
- Release date: April 1921
- Running time: 6 reels (6,100 feet)
- Country: United States
- Language: Silent (English intertitles)

Jim the Penman is a 1921 American silent crime drama film produced by Whitman Bennett and distributed through Associated First National, later just First National Pictures. It was based on Charles Lawrence Young's circa-1886 play Jim the Penman, about a forger in Victorian Britain (itself probably adapted from Felix Philippi's 1884 play Der Advokat). The film stars Lionel Barrymore and was directed by Kenneth Webb, the duo having worked on The Great Adventure previously. Jim the Penman is preserved, though incomplete (reel 5 missing), at the Library of Congress.

== Plot ==
As described in a film publication summary, James "Jim" Ralston is a forger who is in love with Nina. His first attempt at forgery is upon a dance program, and he forges Nina's name for the last waltz. He offers to save Nina's father from ruin by forging a check. He is discovered by the owner of the check, but instead of turning him in, Baron Hartfeld forces Jim to work for him for the next twenty years. Nina is engaged to Louis Percival, but through notes forged by Jim they become estranged. Nina ends up marrying James although she does not love him. As the twenty-year period closes, Jim's daughter Louise is about to marry the son of an English banker that Jim is about to ruin. Just in time Percival, whom Jim has previously ruined, and Nina discover the forgery that separated them. Jim, realizing that he is trapped, ends it all by sinking a yacht after locking himself and his companions in the cabin.

== Cast ==
- Lionel Barrymore as James Ralston
- Ned Burton as Enoch Bronson
- Charles Coghlan as Captain Redwood
- James Laffey as E. J. Smith
- Gladys Leslie as Agnes Ralston
- Douglas MacPherson as Louis Percival
- Anders Randolf as Baron Hartfeld
- Arthur Rankin as Lord Drelincourt
- Doris Rankin as Nina Bronson

== See also ==
- Jim the Penman (1915 film)
