= Eagler =

Eagler is a surname. Notable people with the surname include:

- Paul Eagler (1890–1961), American special effects artist
- Peter C. Eagler (1954–2024), American politician
