= The Woman on the Jury =

1924 film

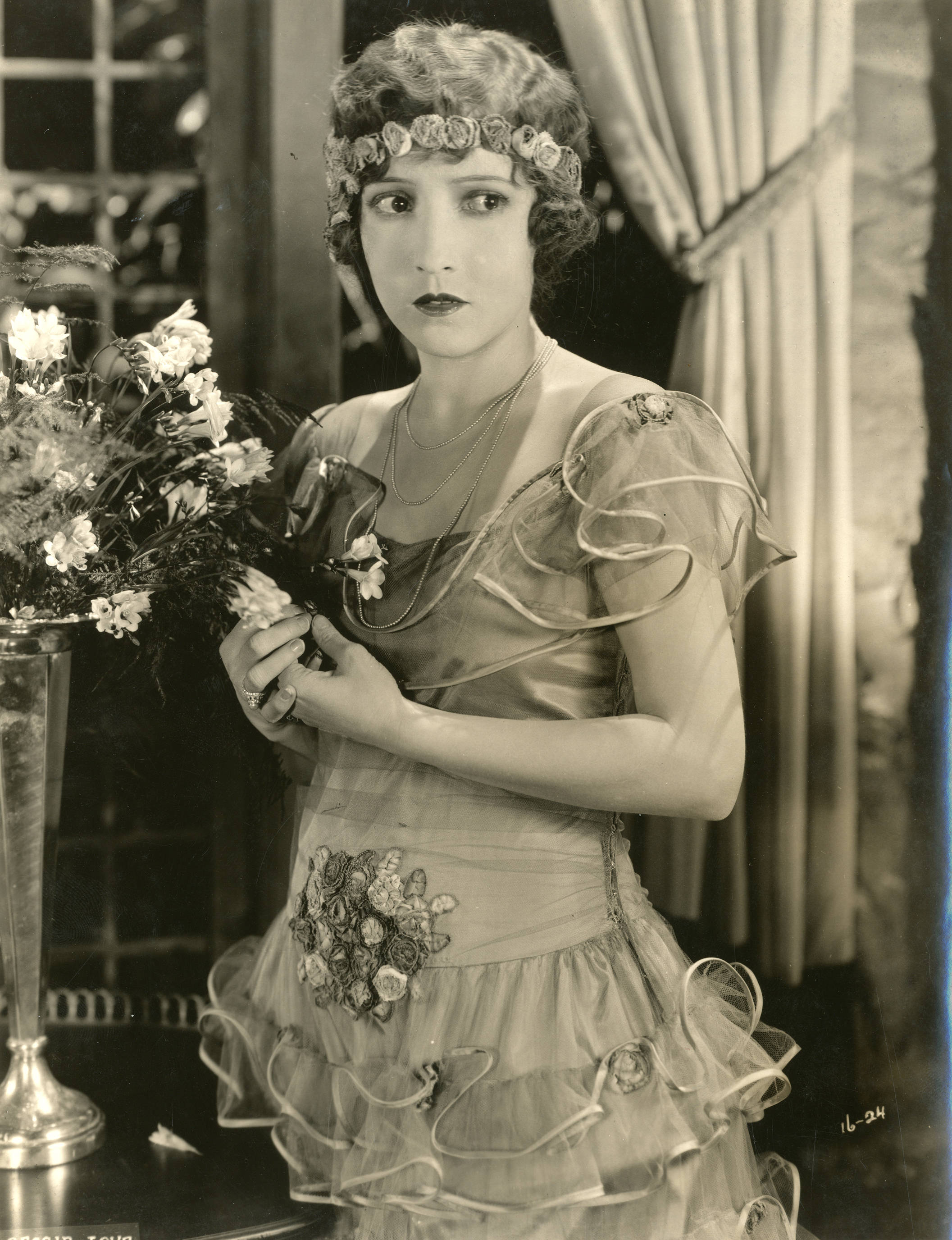
- Bessie Love as Grace Pierce
- Directed by: Harry O. Hoyt
- Written by: Mary O'Hara (scenario)
- Based on: The Woman on the Jury (play) by Bernard K. Burns
- Starring: Sylvia Breamer; Frank Mayo; Lew Cody; Bessie Love
- Cinematography: James Van Trees
- Edited by: Leroy Stone
- Production company: Associated First National
- Distributed by: Associated First National
- Release date: April 20, 1924 (U.S.)
- Running time: 7 reels; 7,408 feet
- Country: United States
- Language: Silent (English intertitles)

The Woman on the Jury is a lost 1924 American silent drama film produced and released by Associated First National and directed by Harry Hoyt. It is based on a Broadway stage play, The Woman on the Jury, (Note: Also known as The Jury Woman.) and stars Sylvia Breamer and Bessie Love. The story was refilmed in 1929 as an early talkie under the title The Love Racket starring Dorothy Mackaill.

== Plot ==
In the Adirondacks, notorious philanderer George Montgomery (Cody) is murdered, and his former sweetheart Grace (Love) is put on trial. Betty Brown (Breamer) and her husband Fred Masters (Mayo) both serve on the jury. When the defendant is nearly wrongfully convicted, Betty reveals her own history with the murder victim—that she once had been in love with him and tried to kill him—proves that the defendant is innocent.

== Cast ==
- Sylvia Breamer as Betty Brown
- Frank Mayo as Fred Masters
- Lew Cody as George Montgomery/George Wayne
- Bessie Love as Grace Pierce
- Mary Carr as Mrs. Pierce
- Hobart Bosworth as Judge Davis
- Myrtle Stedman as Marion Masters
- Henry B. Walthall as prosecuting attorney
- Roy Stewart as defense attorney
- Jean Hersholt as juror
- Ford Sterling as juror
- Arthur Lubin as juror
- Stanton Heck as juror
- Fred Warren as juror
- Edwards Davis as juror
- Arthur Stuart Hull as juror
- Kewpie King as juror
- Leo White as juror

== Production ==
The film was primarily shot at night so that the cast and crew could work on other films during the day.

== Censorship ==
The opening for The Woman on the Jury was scheduled for the Chicago Theatre in Chicago, Illinois on May 5, 1924. But, before the event, the Chicago Board of Censors called to limit entrance to those over 21 years of age. The exhibitors, Balaban & Katz, sought an injunction against the board and the judge ruled in their favor.

== Reception ==
The film received generally positive reviews, and Breamer's performance was particularly well-reviewed.

== Preservation ==
The Woman on the Jury is currently presumed lost. In February 2021, the film was cited by the National Film Preservation Board on their Lost U.S. Silent Feature Films list.
