= Not Guilty (1921 film) =

1921 film

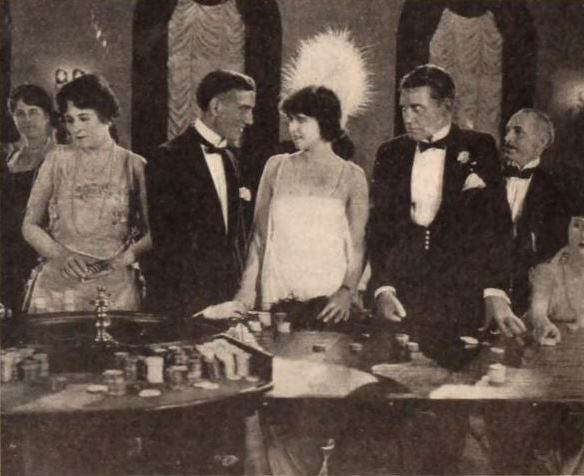
- Directed by: Sidney Franklin
- Written by: J. Grubb Alexander; E.B. Hesser
- Based on: Parrot and Company; 1913 novel by Harold MacGrath
- Produced by: Whitman Bennett; Richard Dix
- Starring: Sylvia Breamer; Richard Dix; Molly Malone
- Production company: Whitman Bennett Productions
- Distributed by: Associated First National Pictures
- Release date: January 1921
- Running time: 70 minutes
- Country: United States
- Languages: Silent; English intertitles

Not Guilty is a 1921 American silent mystery film directed by Sidney Franklin and starring Sylvia Breamer, Richard Dix and Molly Malone.

== Cast ==
- Sylvia Breamer as Elsa Chetwood
- Richard Dix as Paul / Arthur Ellison
- Molly Malone as Margy Ellison
- Elinor Hancock as Mrs. Ellison
- Herbert Prior as Newell Craig
- Lloyd Whitlock as Frank Mallow
- Alberta Lee as Martha
- Charles West as Herbert Welch
- Alice Forbes as Virginia Caldwell

== Bibliography ==
- Munden, Kenneth White. The American Film Institute Catalog of Motion Pictures Produced in the United States, Part 1. University of California Press, 1997.
