= Turned Up (film) =

1924 film

- Directed by: James Chapin
- Written by: Frederic Chapin
- Produced by: William Steiner
- Starring: Charles Hutchison; Mary Beth Milford; Crauford Kent
- Cinematography: Ernest Miller
- Production company: William Steiner Productions
- Distributed by: William Steiner Productions
- Release date: November 1, 1924
- Running time: 50 minutes
- Country: United States
- Languages: Silent; English intertitles

Turned Up is a 1924 American silent drama film directed by James Chapin and starring Charles Hutchison, Mary Beth Milford and Crauford Kent.

== Synopsis ==
A young bank teller is really an agent of the Department of Justice working undercover to expose a crooked bank president and the gang he is in cahoots with.

== Cast ==
- Charles Hutchison as Bruce Pomroy
- Mary Beth Milford as Betty Brownee
- Crauford Kent as Paul Gilmore
- Otto Lederer as John Creighton
- Betty Morrissey as Lola
- Charles Cruz as Joe Turner
- Charles Force as Tom Martin

== Bibliography ==
- Katchmer, George A. A Biographical Dictionary of Silent Film Western Actors and Actresses. McFarland, 2015.
- Munden, Kenneth White. The American Film Institute Catalog of Motion Pictures Produced in the United States, Part 1. University of California Press, 1997.
