= Three Men in a Cart =

1929 film

- Directed by: Arthur Phillips
- Written by: Edward Dryhurst; Arthur Phillips
- Starring: Frank Stanmore; Joan Morgan; David Dunbar; Pat Morton
- Production company: British Screen Productions
- Distributed by: Universal Pictures
- Release date: 1929
- Running time: 57 minutes
- Country: United Kingdom
- Languages: Silent; English intertitles

Three Men in a Cart is a 1929 British silent comedy film directed by Arthur Phillips and starring Frank Stanmore, Joan Morgan and David Dunbar. It was made at Isleworth Studios as a quota quickie for distribution by Universal Pictures. Its plot concerns three friends who discover buried treasure.

== Cast ==
- Frank Stanmore as Hobbs
- Tony Wylde as Charles Stanley
- Pat Morton as Frank Whiteley
- Joan Morgan
- David Dunbar
- Celia Hughesden
- Alice O'Day

== Bibliography ==
- Chibnall, Steve. Quota Quickies: The Birth of the British 'B' film. British Film Institute, 2007.
- Low, Rachael. History of the British Film: Filmmaking in 1930s Britain. George Allen & Unwin, 1985 .
- Wood, Linda. British Films, 1927-1939. British Film Institute, 1986.
