= That Man Jack! =

1925 film

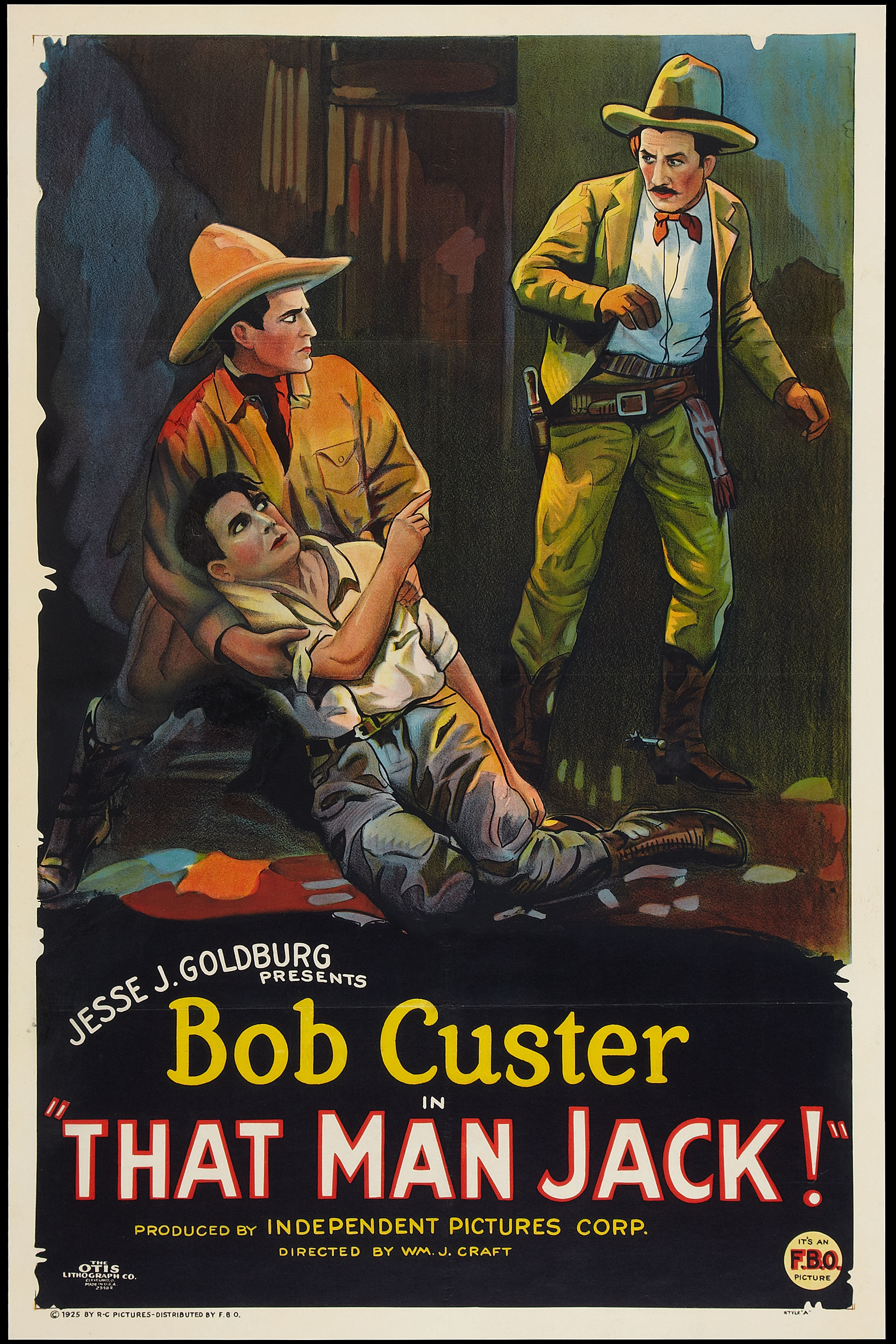
- Poster
- Directed by: William James Craft
- Written by: Adele Buffington
- Story by: George Paul Bauer
- Produced by: Jesse J. Goldburg
- Starring: Bob Custer; Mary Beth Milford; Hayford Hobbs
- Cinematography: Arthur Reeves; William Reis
- Production company: Independent Pictures
- Distributed by: Film Booking Offices of America
- Release date: August 23, 1925
- Running time: 50 minutes
- Country: United States
- Language: Silent (English intertitles)

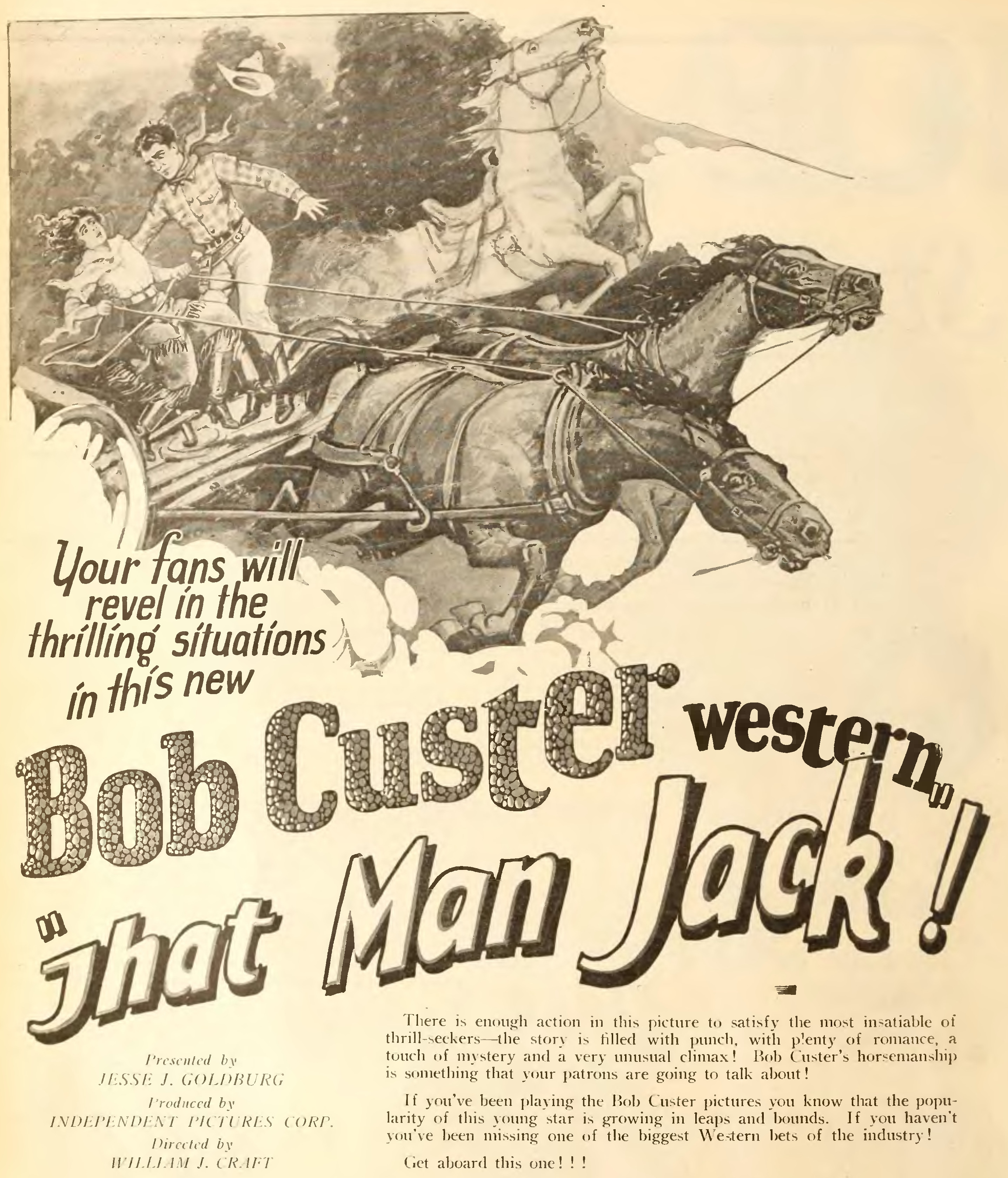
That Man Jack! ad in Motion Picture News, 1925

That Man Jack! is a lost 1925 American silent Western film directed by William James Craft and starring Bob Custer, Mary Beth Milford, and Hayford Hobbs.

== Plot ==
As described in a film magazine reviews, when Anita Leland’s team runs away from her, a muscular stranger intervenes, stops the horses and assists her to dismount. He gives his name as Jack, and when Sammy Sills proposes that he should become his partner in working a mine, he consents, as the proposition enables him to be near the young woman. Jack engages in a fight with Bill Stearns, a husky loafer, and thrashes him soundly. It transpires that his partner Sammy is also in love with Anita, having known her since childhood, and is engaged to her. Jack makes up his mind to leave and rides away. Sammy is attacked by the Steams gang and slain. Suspicion of Sammy's death falls upon Jack, which is strengthened when his share of the gold is found on him. He escapes. Meanwhile, Anita goes to Sammy’s deserted cabin, finds a note written by the dying man naming Stearns as his assailant. Steams appears and tries to seize the evidence, but Jack arrives and saves her. Steams confesses to the crime.

== Cast ==
- Bob Custer as Jack
- Mary Beth Milford as Anita Leland
- Monte Collins as Joe Leland
- Hayford Hobbs as Sammy Sills
- Buck Moulton as Bill Stearns

== Preservation ==
With no holdings located in archives, That Man Jack! is considered a lost film.

== Bibliography ==
- Connelly, Robert B. The Silents: Silent Feature Films, 1910-36, Volume 40, Issue 2. December Press, 1998.
- Munden, Kenneth White. The American Film Institute Catalog of Motion Pictures Produced in the United States, Part 1. University of California Press, 1997.
