= Hollywood Beauty Awards =

The Hollywood Beauty Awards is an annual awards ceremony recognizing talent in makeup, hair, style, and related fields in the entertainment industry.

== History ==
The first Hollywood Beauty Awards ceremony was held on Sunday, February 15, 2015 at the Fonda Theatre in Hollywood. Notable presenters included Jane Fonda and Sir Patrick Stewart, who presented awards to makeup artists Bernadine Anderson and Michael Westmore respectively.

The second annual Hollywood Beauty Awards was held on Sunday, February 21, 2016 at the Avalon Hollywood. Johnny Depp presented the Fragrance of the Year award for Dior Sauvage. Hairstylist Sterfon Demings was honored with the Outstanding Achievement in Hair award.

The third annual Hollywood Beauty Awards was held on Sunday, February 19, 2017, again at the Avalon Hollywood.

The fourth annual Hollywood Beauty Awards was held on Sunday, February 25, 2018 at the Avalon Hollywood. Danai Gurira presented the award for outstanding achievement in makeup to Tym Shutchai Buacharern for his work on Black Panther. Hairstylist Camille Friend also won for her work on the film. Britney Spears won fragrance of the year award for her Fantasy in Bloom perfume. Claude Baruk won celebrity hairstylist of the year.

The fifth annual Hollywood Beauty Awards was held on Sunday, February 17, 2019 at the Avalon Hollywood. Costume designer Ruth E. Carter received an award in costume design and styling for her work on Black Panther. Lori McCoy-Bell and Larry M. Cherry were awarded for outstanding achievement in hairstyling. Several stylists won for their work on A Star is Born, including Ve Neill, Sandra Amador, Tom Eerebout, and Lady Gaga's makeup artist Sarah Tanno. Kim Kardashian attended in a vintage Mugler gown.

The sixth annual Hollywood Beauty Awards was held on Sunday, February 7, 2020 at The Taglyan Complex. Costume designer Jany Temime was recognized with an achievement in design and styling award for her work on Judy. Gloria Pasqua-Casny received an achievement in hairstyling honors for her work on Ford v Ferrari. Stacey Morris also received an achievement in hairstyling honors for her work on Dolemite Is My Name. Makeup artist Nicki Ledermann received the outstanding achievement award for her work on The Irishman and The Devil Wears Prada. Kelly Clarkson attended in a black latex dress. Selena Gomez attended in a Patou dress, in which she couldn't move her arms.

There was no event in 2021 due to the impact of the COVID-19 pandemic.

The Hollywood Beauty Awards returned for its seventh annual event on Saturday, March 19, 2022 at The Taglyan Complex.

The eighth annual Hollywood Beauty Awards was held on Thursday, March 9, 2023 at The Taglyan Complex. Notable presenters included Charlize Theron, Anne Hathaway, and Viola Davis.

The ninth annual Hollywood Beauty Awards was held on Sunday, March 3, 2024 at the Avalon Hollywood.

The tenth annual Hollywood Beauty Awards was held on Sunday, April 6, 2025 in Los Angeles, CA. Notable attendees included Sydney Sweeney and Dyan Cannon.

The eleventh annual Hollywood Beauty Awards was held on Friday, April 10, 2026 at The Taglyan Complex. Tim Allen attended to honor hair designer Bonnie Clevering.

== List of award ceremonies ==
#	Date	Location	Notes
1	Sunday, February 15, 2015	The Fonda Theatre	
2	Sunday, February 21, 2016	Avalon Hollywood	
3	Sunday, February 19, 2017	Avalon Hollywood	
4	Sunday, February 25, 2018	Avalon Hollywood	
5	Sunday, February 17, 2019	Avalon Hollywood	
6	Sunday, February 7, 2020	The Taglyan Complex	
7	Saturday, March 19, 2022	The Taglyan Complex	
8	Thursday, March 9, 2023	The Taglyan Complex	
9	Sunday, March 3, 2024	Avalon Hollywood	
10	Sunday, April 6, 2025	Los Angeles	
11	Friday, April 10, 2026	The Taglyan Complex	
