= Ridin' the Wind =

1925 film directed by Del Andrews

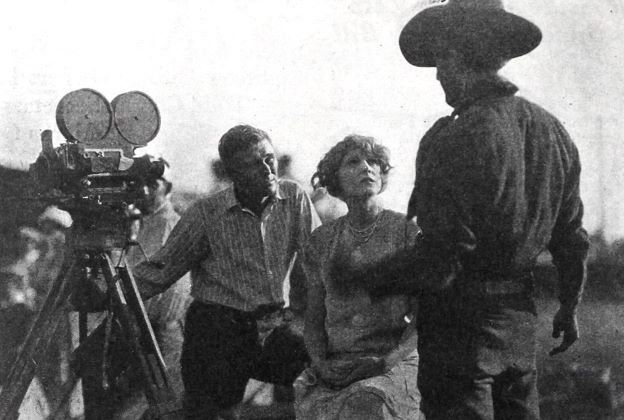
- Still with cameraman Ross Fisher, Jacqueline Gadsdon, and Fred Thomson
- Directed by: Del Andrews
- Written by: Marion Jackson; Frances Marion
- Starring: Fred Thomson; Jacqueline Gadsdon; David Dunbar
- Cinematography: Ross Fisher
- Production company: Film Booking Offices of America
- Distributed by: Film Booking Offices of America
- Release date: August 9, 1925
- Running time: 6 reels
- Country: United States
- Language: Silent (English intertitles)

Ridin' the Wind is a 1925 American silent Western film directed by Del Andrews and starring Fred Thomson, Jacqueline Gadsdon, and David Dunbar.

== Plot ==
As described in a film magazine review, a young rancher who loves the sheriff's daughter is deputized to help break up a bandit gang. He captures the leader and learns that it is his brother, who is supposed to be in college. He clears his brother and wins the affections of the young woman.

== Cast ==
- Fred Thomson as Jim Harkness
- Jacqueline Gadsdon as May Lacy
- Lewis Sargent as Dick Harkness
- David Dunbar as Leader of the Black Hat Gang
- Betty Scott as Dolly Dutton
- David Kirby as Sheriff Lacy

== Bibliography ==
- Donald W. McCaffrey & Christopher P. Jacobs. Guide to the Silent Years of American Cinema. Greenwood Publishing, 1999. ISBN 0-313-30345-2
