= The Bloodhound (1925 film) =

1925 film

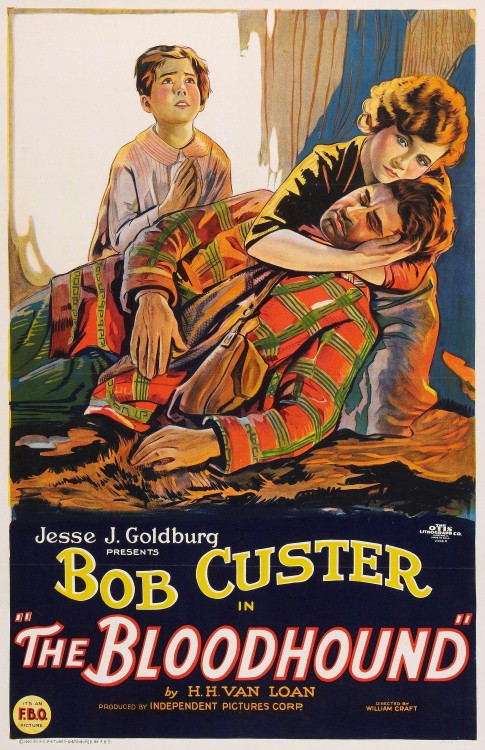
- Directed by: William James Craft
- Written by: Adele Buffington; H. H. Van Loan
- Produced by: Jesse J. Goldburg
- Starring: Bob Custer; David Dunbar; Ralph McCullough
- Cinematography: Arthur Reeves
- Production company: Independent Pictures
- Distributed by: Film Booking Offices of America
- Release date: July 12, 1925
- Running time: 50 minutes
- Country: United States
- Language: Silent (English intertitles)

The Bloodhound is a 1925 American silent Western film, also classified as a Northern. It was directed by William James Craft and starred Bob Custer, David Dunbar, and Ralph McCullough.

== Plot ==
As described in a film magazine reviews, Rambo, the father of Marie, is killed in a fight with a half-breed and with Belleau. The latter rides away. He is met by Fitzgerald, constable of the Northwest Mounted Police. When Fitzgerald hears of the killing, he sends out McKenna, sergeant of the force, whose face is familiar, it seems to Fitzgerald. The latter believes McKenna is the man who killed Rambo and pursues him after McKenna has started out to find Belleau. Marie hears of McKenna’s peril and starts in pursuit. When McKenna reaches the Belleau home, he finds Belleau wounded. He recognizes him as his long lost brother. He takes the blame of the killing upon himself. Marie reaches them and, in her love for him, pleads that he might not confess the crime. The half-breed learns that the guilt has been put on Marie’s lover. He then confesses the crime himself.

== Cast ==
- Bob Custer as Balleau / Sergeant Bill McKenna
- David Dunbar as Rambo
- Ralph McCullough as Constable Ray Fitzgerald
- Mary Beth Milford as Marie Rambo
- Emily Barrye as Betty Belleau

== Preservation ==
With no holdings located in archives, The Bloodhound is considered a lost film.

== Bibliography ==
- Connelly, Robert B. The Silents: Silent Feature Films, 1910-36, Volume 40, Issue 2. December Press, 1998.
- Munden, Kenneth White. The American Film Institute Catalog of Motion Pictures Produced in the United States, Part 1. University of California Press, 1997.
