= Betty Morrissey =

American film actress

- Born: September 14, 1907; New York City, U.S.
- Died: April 20, 1944 (aged 36); New York City, U.S.
- Occupation: Actress
- Spouse: James A. Murray
- Children: 1

Betty Morrissey (September 14, 1907 – April 20, 1944) was an American film actress. She appeared in 12 films between 1923 and 1931. She was born and died in New York City.

Morrissey's mother was Anna Morrissey. She was educated in Brooklyn's public schools before she moved to Hollywood in the early 1920s.

Morrissey was discovered by Erich von Stroheim and appeared in some of his films. She plays the feminine lead in The Leather Pusher series which stars Reginald Denny. She also appeared with Denny in 1925's Skinner's Dress Suit in which she did a Charleston-style dance. She had roles in The Gold Rush starring Charlie Chaplin as well as A Woman of Paris.

She left the motion picture industry in 1928 when she married James A. Murray. Murray became a first lieutenant and trial judge advocate at the army air base in Santa Ana, California. Morrissey died at St. Clare's Hospital in New York City under the name Mrs. Elizabeth Murray on April 20, 1944, aged 36.

The Murrays had a son.

== Selected filmography ==
- A Woman of Paris (1923)
- The Fast Worker (1924)
- What Shall I Do? (1924)
- Virtue's Revolt (1924)
- Turned Up (1924)
- Traffic in Hearts (1924)
- Lady of the Night (1925)
- The Desert Demon (1925)
- Honor Among Lovers (1931)
