= Dorothy Ponedel =

First female makeup artist in Hollywood

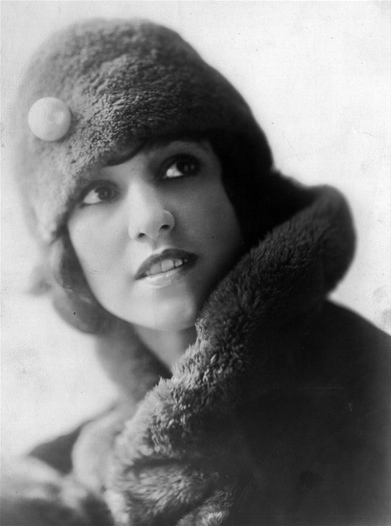
- Dottie Ponedel's headshot from the early 1920s when she began her career.
- Born: Dorothy Ponedel; July 2, 1898; Chicago, Illinois, US
- Died: April 30, 1979 (aged 80); Los Angeles County, California, US
- Occupation: Make-up artist

Dorothy "Dottie" Ponedel was the first female makeup artist to work in the Hollywood film industry in the 1930's.

== Early life and acting ==
Ponedel was born on July 2, 1898, in Chicago, Illinois. She moved to Los Angeles in 1920 with her mother, and they set up a bakery.

One day, Ponedel noticed lots of activity outside the shop- they were shooting a film. She got to work as an extra, and from then she pursued work in the film industry. She played a range of roles in films like Galloping Vengeance in 1925, Border Justice in 1925, Across the Pacific in 1926, The Isle of the Forgotten Women in 1927.

== Makeup artistry ==
In 1930, Ponedel stepped in to do makeup on actress Nancy Carroll for the picture Follow Thru. Her skills were in demand from then onward, and major stars insisted on having Ponedel in their contracts.

Ponedel was a makeup artist for actresses such as Marlene Dietrich, Mae West, Joan Blondell, Adrienne Ames, Carole Lombard, Paulette Goddard, and Judy Garland.

In 1944, Ponedel was Judy Garland's personal makeup artist for Meet Me in St. Louis, and she is credited for giving Garland her new look. She remained Garland's personal makeup artist while Garland was at MGM. She worked with Garland for 25 years and together they did movies like The Clock, Ziegfeld Follies and The Harvey Girls.

At the time Ponedel began work as a makeup artist, the position was called makeup man, and the Make-Up Artists Local 76 union was all-male. The union objected to Ponedel's inclusion, but actresses Mae West and Marlene Dietrich successfully advocated for Ponedel.

Ponedel continued to have trouble with the union trying to oust her over the years. In 1942, Ponedel wrote a letter addressed to makeup man Ern Westmore and the union that began: "Gentlemen, Again I have been informed that there is a movement to oust me from the Union for the crime of being a woman."

== Health issues and death ==
By 1957, Ponedel had been bedridden for almost five years, and doctors were unable to diagnose what was wrong. Judy Garland had taken Ponedel to the clinic several times.

Ponedel died on April 30, 1979, aged 80 years old, after a battle with multiple sclerosis.

== See also ==
- Bernadine Anderson, the first black female makeup artist in the Hollywood film industry
