= My Lady's Garter =

1920 film by Maurice Tourneur

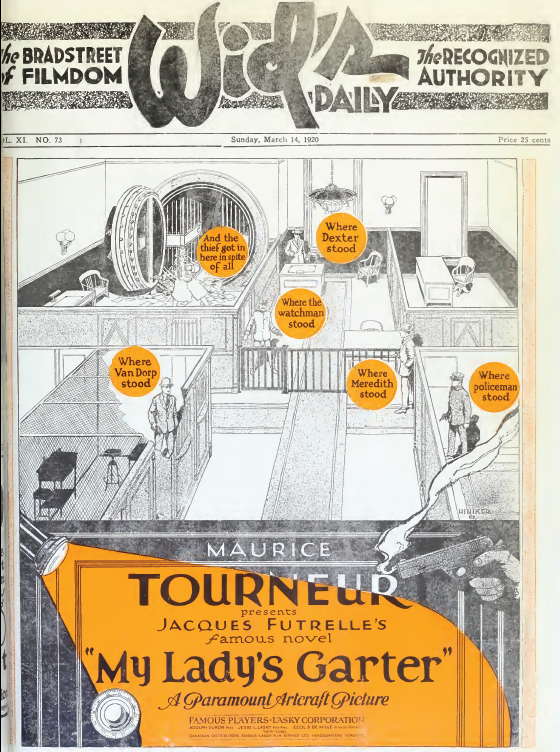
- Advertisement
- Directed by: Maurice Tourneur
- Written by: Lloyd Lonergan (scenario)
- Based on: My Lady's Garter by Jacques Futrelle
- Produced by: Maurice Tourneur
- Starring: Wyndham Standing; Sylvia Breamer; Holmes Herbert; Warner Richmond
- Cinematography: René Guissart
- Production company: Maurice Tourneur Productions
- Distributed by: Famous Players–Lasky Corporation
- Release date: March 14, 1920 (United States)
- Running time: 60 minutes
- Country: United States
- Language: Silent (English intertitles)

My Lady's Garter is a lost 1920 American silent mystery film directed by Maurice Tourneur and starring Wyndham Standing, Sylvia Breamer and Holmes Herbert. It was based on the 1912 novel of the same name by Jacques Futrelle, a writer who perished with the sinking of the Titanic in 1912.

== Plot ==
As described in a film magazine, a jeweled garter with an interesting history disappears under mysterious circumstances from the British Museum. The Hawk, a criminal who has never been apprehended even though he obligingly leaves many clues for the police to follow, is suspected. Helen Hamilton, daughter of a wealthy American, loses her jewels after throwing them out of a window at Keats Gaunt, a poet she imagines she is in love with. A tiff with Gaunt follows and she dives into the sea, being rescued by a strange gentleman in a yacht who gives his name as Bruce Calhoun. English detectives suspect him of the robbery and watch him closely. He goes to Helen's home and becomes acquainted with her family, but his mysterious actions raise doubts in the minds of all save Helen, who now loves him. Not even to her, however, will he admit his part in the mysterious proceedings that are occurring continuously until, by a master stroke, he catches the criminal, a rival for Helen's affections, and then reveals that he is an American secret service man and worthy of her love.

== Cast ==
- Wyndham Standing as Bruce Calhoun
- Sylvia Breamer as Helen Hamilton
- Holmes Herbert as Henry Van Derp, aka The Hawk
- Warner Richmond as Meredith
- Paul Clerget as Dexter
- Warren Cook as Brokaw Hamilton
- Louise de Rigney as Mrs. Hamilton
- Charles Craig as Keats Gaunt

== Bibliography ==
- Waldman, Harry. Maurice Tourneur: The Life and Films. McFarland, 2008.
