= Rough Stuff =

1925 film by Dell Henderson

- Directed by: Dell Henderson
- Produced by: Dell Henderson
- Starring: George Larkin
- Distributed by: Rayart Pictures
- Release date: September 16, 1925
- Running time: 50 minutes
- Country: USA
- Languages: Silent, English titles

Rough Stuff is a 1925 silent film drama directed by Dell Henderson and starring George Larkin.

It is preserved in the Library of Congress collection.

== Cast ==
- George Larkin
- Mary Beth Milford
