= The Fast Worker =

1924 film directed by William A. Seiter

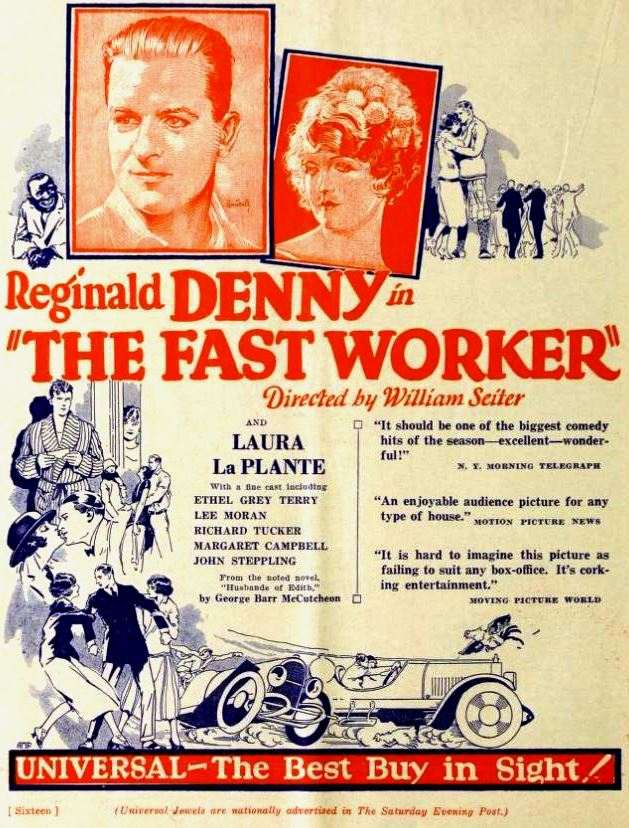
- From a trade publication
- Directed by: William A. Seiter
- Written by: Raymond L. Schrock; Beatrice Van
- Based on: The Fast Worker by George Barr McCutcheon
- Produced by: Carl Laemmle
- Starring: Reginald Denny; Laura La Plante; Ethel Grey Terry
- Cinematography: Ben F. Reynolds
- Edited by: John Rawlins
- Production company: Universal Pictures
- Distributed by: Universal Pictures
- Release date: October 26, 1924
- Running time: 70 minutes
- Country: United States
- Language: Silent (English intertitles)

The Fast Worker is a 1924 American silent comedy film directed by William A. Seiter and starring Reginald Denny, Laura La Plante, and Ethel Grey Terry.

== Cast ==
- Reginald Denny as Terry Brock
- Laura La Plante as Connie Fowler
- Ethel Grey Terry as Edith Medcroft
- Muriel Frances Dana as Toodles Medcroft
- Lee Moran as Freddie Ulstervelt
- Richard Tucker as Roxbury Medcroft
- Margaret Campbell as Mrs. Rodney
- Betty Morrissey as 'Kath' Rodney
- Mildred Vincent as Nurse
- John Steppling as Mr. Rodney
- T. D. Crittenden as Mr. O'Dell Carney
- Clarissa Selwynne as Mrs. O'Dell Carney
- Malcolm Denny as Undetermined Secondary Role (uncredited)
- George H. Reed as Train Porter (uncredited)
- Lydia Yeamans Titus as Cafe Waitress (uncredited)

== Preservation ==
Prints of The Fast Worker are located in the collections of the UCLA Film & Television Archive and EYE Film Institute Netherlands.

== Bibliography ==
- Goble, Alan. The Complete Index to Literary Sources in Film. Walter de Gruyter, 1999.
