= Homer Comes Home =

1920 film by Jerome Storm

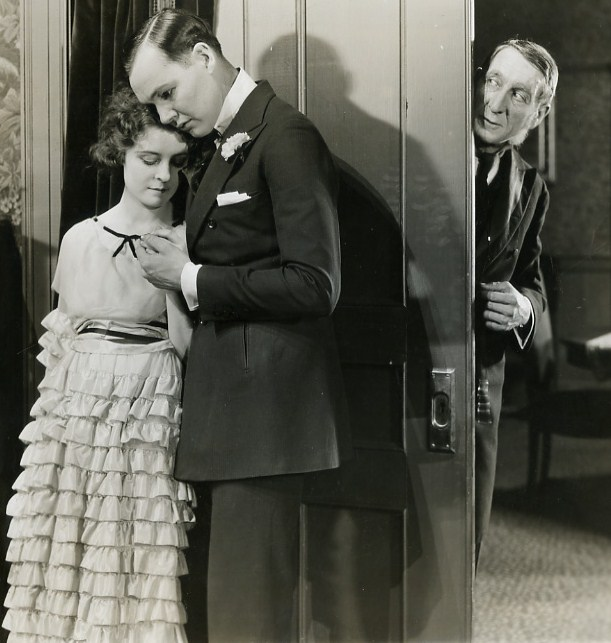
- Film still with Priscilla Bonner, Charles Ray, and Otto Hoffman
- Directed by: Jerome Storm
- Screenplay by: Alexander Hull; Agnes Christine Johnston
- Produced by: Thomas H. Ince
- Starring: Charles Ray; Otto Hoffman; Priscilla Bonner; Ralph McCullough; Walter Higby; John Elliott; Harry Hyde
- Cinematography: Chester A. Lyons
- Edited by: Harry L. Decker
- Production companies: Thomas H. Ince Productions; Artcraft Pictures Corporation; Famous Players–Lasky Corporation
- Distributed by: Paramount Pictures
- Release date: June 27, 1920
- Running time: 50 minutes
- Country: United States
- Language: Silent (English intertitles)

Homer Comes Home is a 1920 American silent comedy drama film directed by Jerome Storm and written by Alexander Hull and Agnes Christine Johnston. The film stars Charles Ray, Otto Hoffman, Priscilla Bonner, Ralph McCullough, Walter Higby, John Elliott, and Harry Hyde.

== Plot ==
Homer Cavender is regarded as a failure by the people in his hometown, because he has been fired from just about every job.

The only person sorry to see him go is Rachel Prouty, daughter of one of the town's leading citizens. He goes to work as a clerk for Bailly and Kort.

Two years after he started working, Homer finds he is not progressing rapidly enough. He has an idea of creating a factory in his hometown. But the venture requires money to get off the ground. His bosses refuses to finance the venture. However, Homer has managed to save $300. With his cash, he returns home on the Lightning Express, which carries only important people.

The whole town turns out to see him return, sporting his new suit. Homer takes the best room at a local hotel. He hires the local taxi for two weeks. He spends money recklessly. He wants to propose to Rachel, but is afraid to let her know he really has no money. Then he secures the capital to carry out his venture by offering the citizens stock in the enterprise. But Arthur Machim, a jealous rival of Homer's finds out that he is only a clerk, and spreads the news that Homer is dishonest. When Homer fails to appear at work after receiving the financial backing, it appears to everyone that Machim is correct.

Then Homer's venture comes to pass, and he is named the boss of his factory. In so doing, he also wins the hand of Rachel.

== Cast ==
- Charles Ray as Homer Cavender
- Otto Hoffman as Silas Prouty
- Priscilla Bonner as Rachel Prouty
- Ralph McCullough as Arthur Machim
- Walter Higby as Old Machim
- John Elliott as Mr. Bailly
- Harry Hyde as Mr. Kort
- Gus Leonard as The Grocer
- Joseph Hazelton as The Shoe Store Man
- Bert Woodruff as Farmer Higgins
- Louis Morrison as Old Tracey

== Crew ==
- Direction : Jerome Storm
- Producer : Thomas H. Ince
- Screenplay : Alexander Hull, Agnes Christine Johnston
- Cinematography : Chester A. Lyons (as Chester Lyons)
- Film Editing : Harry L. Decker
- Art Direction : W.L. Heywood
- Art Department : Leo H. Braun, Carl Schneider, F.J. Van Halle
- Supervisor : Thomas H. Ince
- Technical director : Harvey C. Leavitt

== Production ==
The film was released on June 27, 1920, by Paramount Pictures.

== Preservation status ==
A copy of the film exists in a collection or archive.
