= David Dunbar (actor) =

Australian-American actor (1886–1953)

- Born: 14 September 1886; West Maitland, New South Wales, Australia
- Died: 7 November 1953 (aged 67); Los Angeles, California, United States
- Occupation: Film actor
- Years active: 1924–1953

David Dunbar (14 September 1886 – 7 November 1953) was an Australian film actor. Dunbar was a prominent actor in American and British silent films, particularly in westerns, but switched to playing more minor roles after the arrival of sound. In later years he appeared mostly in British-themed Hollywood films. He was one of the first film actors beginning his screen career with Pathe Freres, Paris in 1910. Previously he was an actor on the legitimate stage both in Australia, his homeland and in Britain.

== Partial filmography ==
- Leatherstocking (1924) - Chingachgook
- The Fortieth Door (1924) - Andy McLean
- Trail Dust (1924) - Joe Paden
- Shootin' Square (1924) - (uncredited)
- North of 36 (1924) - Dell Williams
- Ridin' the Wind (1924)
- Fair Play (1925) - Bull Mong
- Galloping Vengeance (1925) - Duke Granby
- The White Desert (1925)
- The Bloodhound (1925) - Rambo
- Ridin' the Wind (1925) - Leader of the Black Hat Gang
- A Man of Nerve (1925) - Rangey Greer
- The Cowboy Musketeer (1925) - Tony Vaquerrelli
- Beyond the Rockies (1926) - Cottle
- The Non-Stop Flight (1926) - Captain Karl Kruger
- The Galloping Cowboy (1926) - Pedro
- The Fighting Marine (1927)
- The Arizona Whirlwind (1927) - Bert Hawley
- The King of Kings (1927) - (uncredited)
- The Broncho Buster (1927) - Curtis Harris
- The Fighting Hombre (1927) - 'Goldstud' Hopkins
- The Boy Rider (1927) - Bill Hargus
- Gold from Weepah (1927)
- The Streets of London (1929) - Gideon Bloodgood
- The Second Mate (1929) - Jack Arkwright
- Human Cargo (1929) - Inspector Benson
- Three Men in a Cart (1929)
- Plunging Hoofs (1929) - 'Squint' Jones
- Downstream (1929) - Digger Brent
- The Return of Dr. Fu Manchu (1930) - Detective Lawrence (uncredited)
- Shock (1934) - Sergeant Matthews (uncredited)
- One More River (1934) - Chauffeur at Station (uncredited)
- Clive of India (1935) - Clerk (uncredited)
- Les Misérables (1935) - Gendarme in Prefect's Office (uncredited)
- A Feather in Her Hat (1935) - Truck Driver (uncredited)
- The Great Impersonation (1935) - English Farmer (uncredited)
- Little Lord Fauntleroy (1936) - Jeffries - Carriage Driver (uncredited)
- Under Two Flags (1936) - Chasseur Officer (uncredited)
- Dracula's Daughter (1936) - Motor Bobby (uncredited)
- Bulldog Drummond's Peril (1938) - Constable (uncredited)
- A Christmas Carol (1938) - (uncredited)
- Rulers of the Sea (1939) - Boatswain (uncredited)
- The Earl of Chicago (1940) - Plowman (uncredited)
- Escape to Glory (1940) - Sailor (uncredited)
- Those Were the Days! (1940) - Bakeman (uncredited)
- North West Mounted Police (1940) - Vitale (uncredited)
- Dr. Jekyll and Mr. Hyde (1941) - Footman (uncredited)
- The Blonde from Singapore (1941) - Turnkey (uncredited)
- Confirm or Deny (1941) - Workman (uncredited)
- Mrs. Miniver (1942) - Man in Store (uncredited)
- Green Dolphin Street (1947) - Captain's Voice (uncredited)
- Forever Amber (1947) - Ruffian (uncredited)
- If Winter Comes (1947) - Milkman (uncredited)
- A Woman's Vengeance (1948) - Workman (uncredited)
- Summer Holiday (1948) - Spirit of '76 (uncredited)
- Kiss the Blood Off My Hands (1948) - Large Man (uncredited)
- Joan of Arc (1948) - English Soldier (uncredited)
- Hills of Home (1948) - Barker for Whisky (uncredited)
- Challenge to Lassie (1949) - Driver (uncredited)
- That Forsyte Woman (1949) - Driver (uncredited)
- Young Man with a Horn (1950) - Alcoholic Bum (uncredited)
- The Milkman (1950) - Bill (uncredited)
- Dallas (1950) - Prisoner (uncredited)
- Soldiers Three (1951) - Cavalryman (uncredited)
- The Law and the Lady (1951) - Driver (uncredited)
- Thunder on the Hill (1951) - Minor Role (uncredited)
- The Lady and the Bandit (1951) - Coachman (uncredited)
- Anne of the Indies (1951) - Capt. Crockett (uncredited)
- The Son of Dr. Jekyll (1951) - Man in Bar (uncredited)
- Million Dollar Mermaid (1952) - Minor Role (uncredited)
- Rogue's March (1953) - Sgt. Major (uncredited)
- Knock on Wood (1954) - English Desk Clerk (uncredited) (final film role)

== Bibliography ==
- Low, Rachel. The History of British Film: Volume IV, 1918–1929. Routledge, 1997.
- Wooley, John. Shot in Oklahoma: A Century of Sooner State Cinema. University of Oklahoma Press, 2012.
