= The Man Who Married His Own Wife =

1922 film

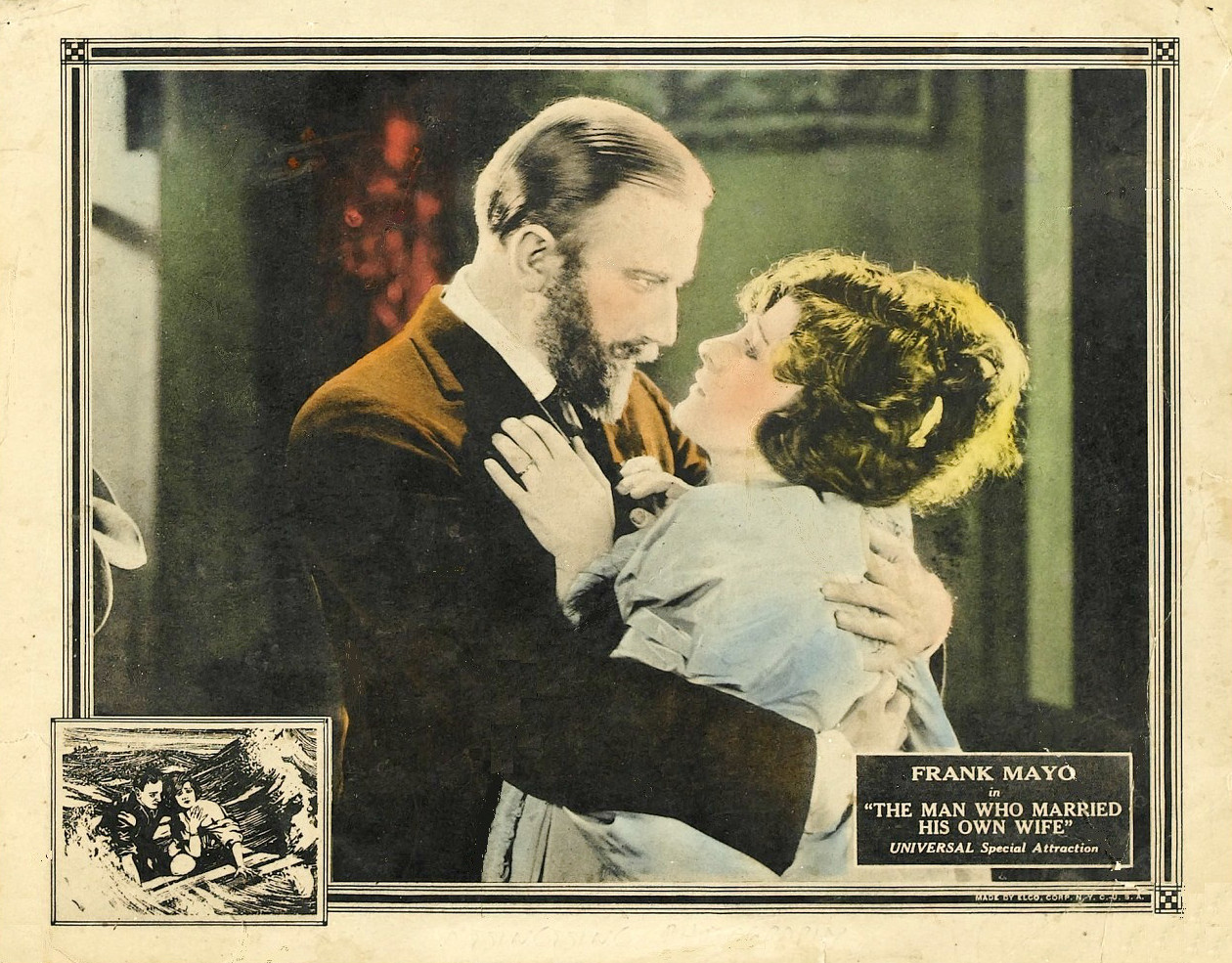
- Lobby card
- Directed by: Stuart Paton
- Screenplay by: George Hively
- Based on: The Man Who Married His Own Wife by: John Fleming Wilson; Mary Ashe Miller
- Starring: Frank Mayo; Sylvia Breamer; Marie Crisp; Howard Crampton; Francis McDonald; Joseph W. Girard
- Cinematography: Arthur Reeves
- Production company: Universal Film Manufacturing Company
- Distributed by: Universal Film Manufacturing Company
- Release date: May 1, 1922
- Running time: 50 minutes
- Country: United States
- Language: Silent (English intertitles)

The Man Who Married His Own Wife is a 1922 American drama film directed by Stuart Paton and written by George Hively. The film stars Frank Mayo, Sylvia Breamer, Marie Crisp, Howard Crampton, Francis McDonald, and Joseph W. Girard. The film was released on May 1, 1922, by Universal Film Manufacturing Company.

== Cast ==
- Frank Mayo as Jasper Marsden
- Sylvia Breamer as Elsie Haynes
- Marie Crisp as Miss Muriel Blythe
- Howard Crampton as Judge Lawrence
- Francis McDonald as Freddie Needham
- Joseph W. Girard as John Marsden (credited as Joe Girard)
