= Mary Beth Milford =

American actress and dancer (1904–1982)

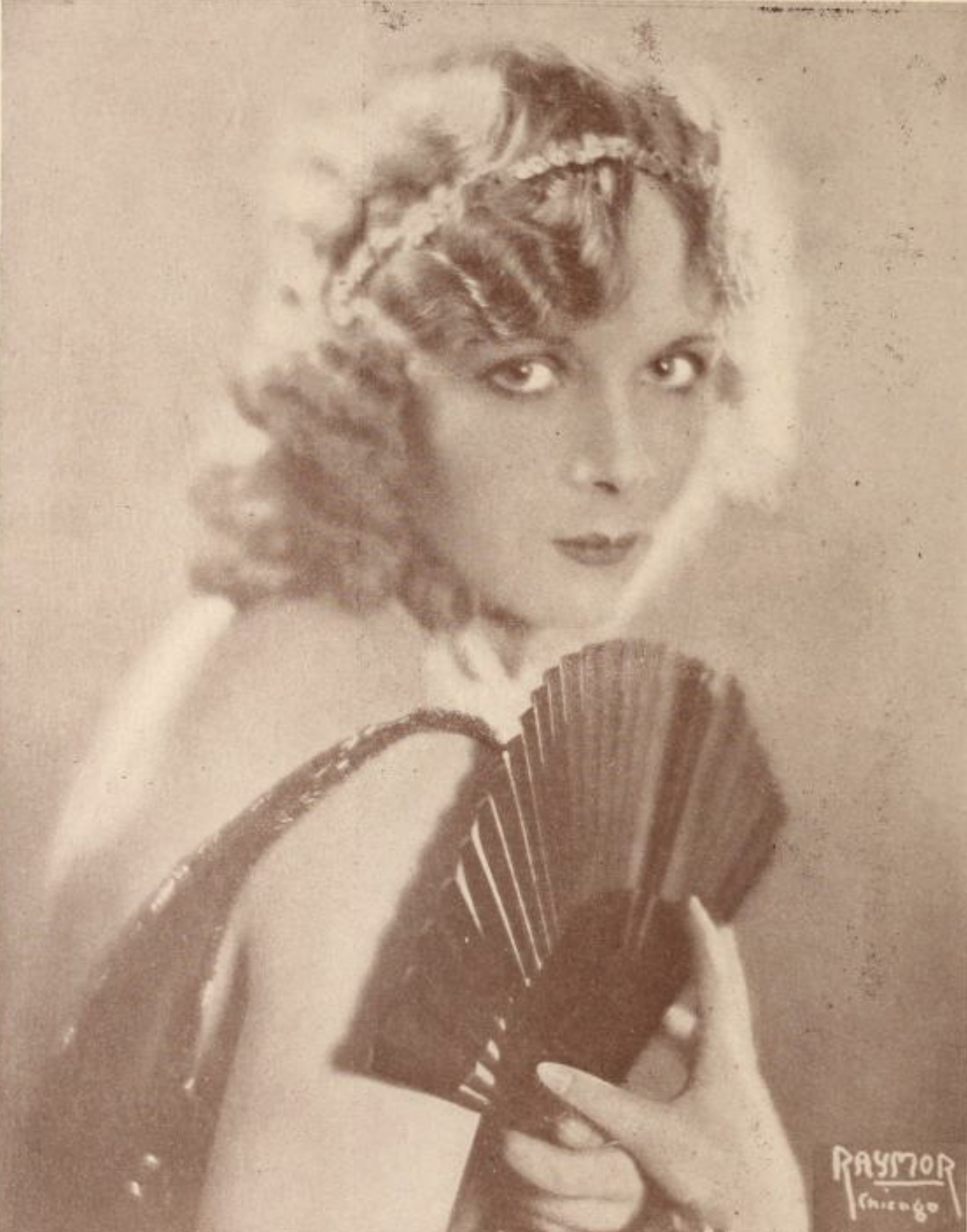
Mary Beth Milford in 1923.

Marian Elizabeth Cox, also known by her married names Mary E. Noyes and Mary E. Ottenheimer, (August 2, 1904 – October 8, 1982) was an American actress and dancer who was known on the stage and in film as Mary Beth Milford. Born in Texas and raised in California, she began her career as a child dancer in the mid 1910s in Los Angeles under the name Mary Beth Cox. In the late 1910s and early 1920s she performed on Broadway in The Greenwich Village Follies (1919), Sally (1920), and Music Box Revue (1921-1922). She appeared in films in uncredited roles as early as 1914, and had a career as a leading silent film actress from 1923 to 1927. After this she retired from performance. She later worked as a music arranger in Los Angeles. She should not be confused with the comedienne Mary Milford who performed in sound films and on the stage in the 1930s and 1940s.

== Early life and career ==
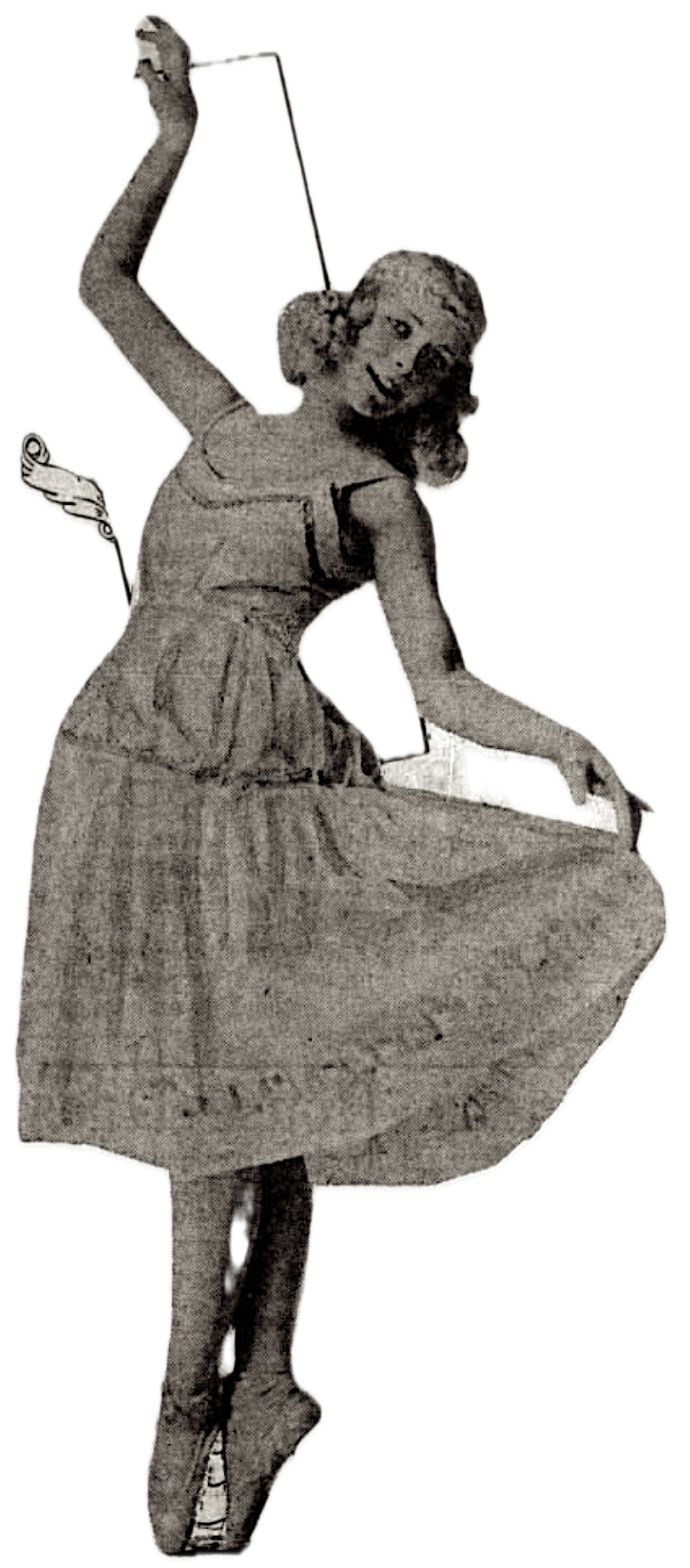
Mary Beth Cox (later known as Mary Beth Milford) in 1917.

The daughter of Albert Sidney Cox and Ida Cox, Marian Elizabeth ("Mary Beth") Cox was born in El Paso, Texas on August 2, 1904. By the time of 1910 United States Federal Census she was living in Los Angeles, California with her parents. Her cousin was the actress Mary Miles Minter. As a child she studied singing in Los Angeles with Thomas Taylor Drill and was one of several pupils who performed in recital at the Majestic Theatre in 1917. She also studied ballet in L.A. with Ernest Belcher.

In 1916 the Los Angeles Evening Express reported that Mary Beth Cox was an accomplished dancer active in the Los Angeles Travel club, a youth organization, and that she had appeared in silent films. She had uncredited parts in The Pursuit of the Phantom (1914), A Little Princess (1917, with Mary Pickford), A Virgin Paradise (1921, with Pearl White), Footlights (1921, with Elsie Ferguson), and the The Old Oaken Bucket (1921, with May Tully).

In the summer of 1916 she performed in the 20th annual Shakespeare Pageant in Los Angeles. She also performed at many community events sponsored by various clubs in Los Angeles in the mid 1910s; giving dramatic readings as well as dancing and singing. In 1917 the Los Angeles Tribune published a photograph of Mary Beth Cox performing Russian ballet.

== Work on Broadway and leading roles in film ==
Cox adopted the stage name Mary Beth Milford in New York City. In 1919 she made her Broadway debut as a dancer in The Greenwich Village Follies. This was follow by performances in a musical revue organized by Gus Edwards in 1920, and work in the ensemble of the Broadway musical Sally by Jerome Kern. In the 1921-1922 season she starred in Irving Berlin's Music Box Revue at Broadway's Music Box Theatre.

Milford's first credited screen role was for the Film Booking Offices of America film in Fighting Blood (1923) which was based on a short story by H. C. Witwer. In her early film career she appeared in many short silent films with George O'Hara; including So This Is Hollywood (1923), She Supes to Conquer (1923), Long Live the Ring (1923), The Taming of the Shrewd (1923), The Wages of Cinema (1923, as Rosemary), Merchant of Menace (1923), and Babes in Hollywood (1923).

Her later film credits included several feature length films; including After Dark (1924, as Little Eva), Turned Up (1924, as Betty Browne), Morals for Men (1925, as Mary), Bashful Whirlwind (1925, as Gladys Denton), The Bloodhound (1925, as Marie Rambo), Galloping Vengeance (1925, as Marion Reeves), That Man Jack! (1925, as Anita Leland), Are Parents People? (1925, as Aurella Wilton), The Right Man (1925, as Mary Burton), Rough Stuff (1925), Once in a Lifetime (1925, as Edna Perry), A Horse on Broadway (1926), and The Reckless Mollycoddle (1927).

== Later life ==
Billboard magazine reported in its January 22, 1927 edition that Mary Beth Milford had recently married Hollywood businessman Harold A. Noyes. However, her marriage certificate dates the marriage to years earlier with a wedding occurring in Los Angeles on October 26, 1923. The 1940 United States Federal Census reports that Mary and Harold were living in Long Beach, California with their son Michael and daughter Lynne.

In the 1950 United States Federal Census it was reported that Mary was divorced and that she was employed in Los Angeles as a music arranger. Her mother, Ida, was living with her and her two children at their home on Lennington Avenue in L.A. at this time. Her daughter's 1954 wedding announcement in the San Francisco Chronicle states that she was married to Lindsey Ottenheimer and was living in Westwood, Los Angeles. Her second husband died on April 27, 1968.

Mary Elizabeth Ottenheimer died in Los Angeles on October 8, 1982. She is buried at Forest Lawn Memorial Park in Glendale, California.
