= The Millionaire Vagrant =

1917 film by Victor Schertzinger

- Directed by: Victor Schertzinger
- Written by: J. G. Hawks
- Produced by: Thomas H. Ince
- Starring: Charles Ray; Sylvia Breamer; J. Barney Sherry
- Cinematography: Paul Eagler
- Production companies: Kay-Bee Pictures; New York Motion Picture
- Distributed by: Triangle Distributing
- Release date: May 27, 1917
- Running time: 50 minutes
- Country: United States
- Languages: Silent; English intertitles

The Millionaire Vagrant is a 1917 American silent drama film directed by Victor Schertzinger and starring Charles Ray, Sylvia Breamer and J. Barney Sherry.

== Plot ==
Wealthy young man Steven du Peyster finds more adventures than he expected when he accepts a wager that he can live successfully on six dollars a week.

== Cast ==
- Charles Ray as Steven Du Peyster
- Sylvia Breamer as Ruth Vail
- J. Barney Sherry as Malcolm Blackridge
- John Gilbert as James Cricket
- Elvira Weil as Peggy O'Connor
- Dorcas Matthews as Betty Vanderfleet
- Aggie Herring as Mrs. Flannery
- Josephine Headley as Squidge
- Carlyn Wagner as Rose
- Walt Whitman as Old Bookkeeper

== Preservation ==
A copy of The Millionaire Vagrant with Dutch intertitles is located at the George Eastman Museum.

== Bibliography ==
- Golden, Eve. John Gilbert: The Last of the Silent Film Stars. University Press of Kentucky, 2013.
