= Across the Divide =

1921 film

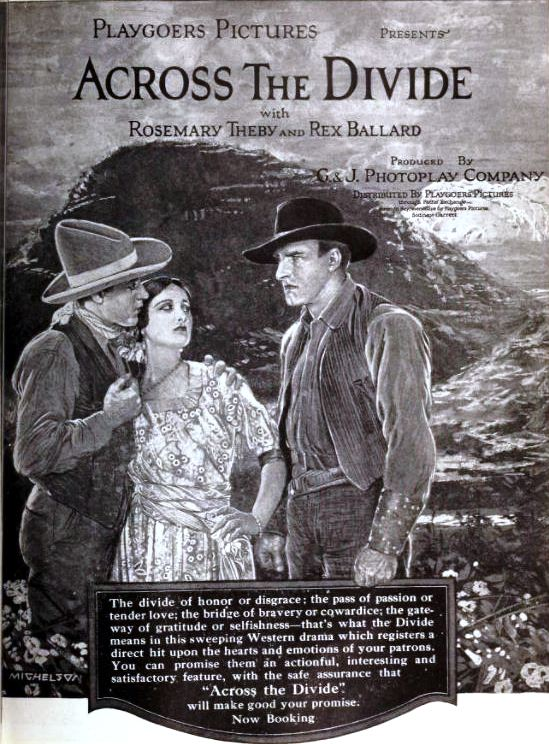
- Directed by: John Holloway
- Written by: Beatrice Frederick
- Starring: Rex Ballard; Rosemary Theby; Ralph McCullough
- Cinematography: Allen Q. Thompson
- Production companies: G. & J. Photoplay Company; Playgoers Pictures
- Distributed by: Associated Exhibitors
- Release date: October 9, 1921
- Running time: 60 minutes
- Country: United States
- Languages: Silent; English intertitles

Across the Divide is a lost 1921 American silent Western film directed by John Holloway and starring Rex Ballard, Rosemary Theby and Ralph McCullough.

== Plot ==
Left by his dying mother in the care of Buck, Wallace Layson has no knowledge of his real identity. Wallace is to inherit a ranch on his 21st birthday. His father returns and induces Rosa, a dancehall girl, to marry Wallace in a plot to cheat him out of his inheritance. But Wallace is in love with Helen. Buck tells Wallace that the real heir has died and persuades him to pose as the heir, which foils the plans of his father and secures a home for Wallace and Helen. Buck reveals the Wallace's true identity and leaves without revealing that he is the Wallace's half brother.

== Cast ==
- Rex Ballard as Buck Layson
- Rosemary Theby as Rosa
- Ralph McCullough as Wallace Layson
- Thomas Delmar as Dago
- Gilbert Clayton as Newton
- Dorothy Manners as Helen
- Flora Hollister as White Flower

== Themes ==
According to A Guide to Silent Westerns, the film is an "early drama" that "takes advantage of the natural surroundings, thus anticipating one of the prerequisites of a good Western."

== Preservation ==
With no holdings located in archives, Across the Divide is considered a lost film.
