= The Cowboy Musketeer =

1925 film

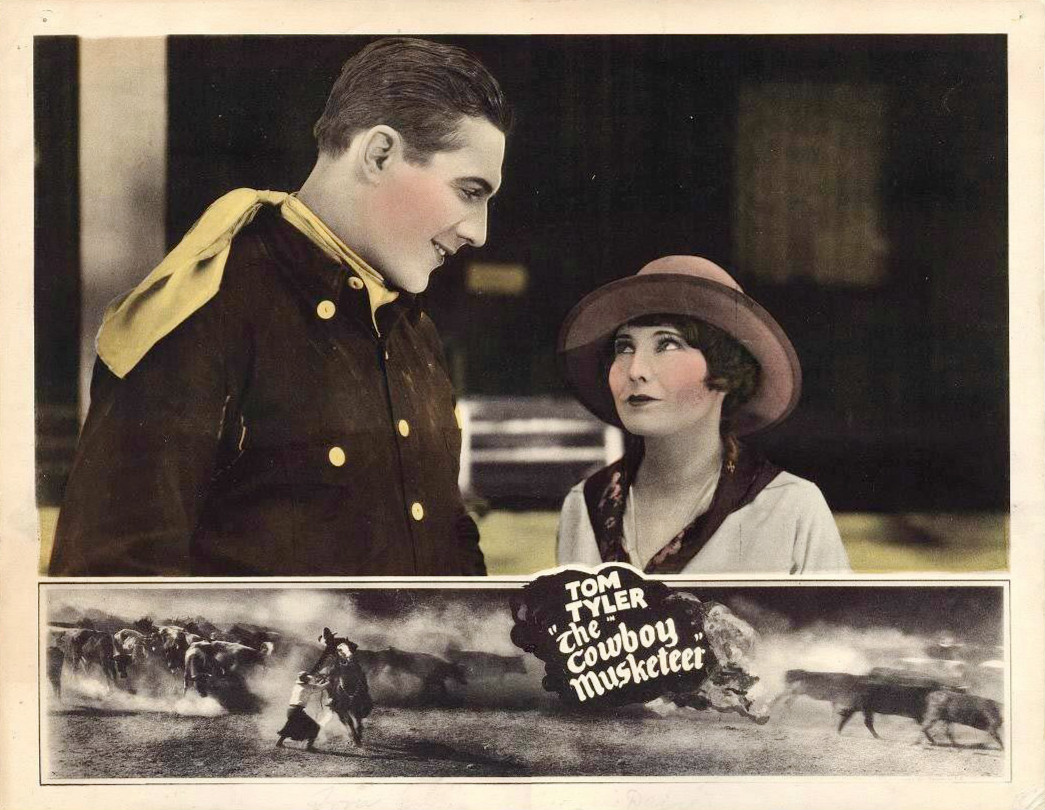
- Lobby card
- Directed by: Robert De Lacey
- Written by: Buckleigh Fritz Oxford
- Starring: Tom Tyler; Frankie Darro; David Dunbar
- Cinematography: John W. Leezer
- Production company: Robertson-Cole Pictures Corporation
- Distributed by: Film Booking Offices of America
- Release date: December 13, 1925
- Running time: 50 minutes
- Country: United States
- Language: Silent (English intertitles)

The Cowboy Musketeer is a 1925 American silent Western film directed by Robert De Lacey and starring Tom Tyler, Frankie Darro, and David Dunbar. In the film, a cowboy helps a woman find the hidden gold mine she has inherited from her father before others can get their hands on it.

== Plot ==
As described in a film magazine review, Tom Latigo, a roving cowboy, rescues a desperado from a posse and out of gratitude the desperado reveals a plot by another man to steal from a young woman a valuable gold claim. The cowboy starts out to prevent the plotters from stealing the claim. His life and the life of Leila Gordon, the young woman who has inherited the claim from her father, are several times endangered during the events that ensue, including when Tom saves her from being trampled under the hoofs of a cattle stampede. However, from each danger the pair escapes, and finally the villains are arrested and brought to justice.

== Cast ==
- Tom Tyler as Tom Latigo
- Frankie Darro as Billy Gordon
- Frances Dare as Leila Gordon
- David Dunbar as Tony Vaquerrelli
- Tom London as Joe Dokes

== Preservation ==
With no holdings located in archives, The Cowboy Musketeer is considered a lost film.
