= Sudden Jim =

1917 film by Victor Schertzinger

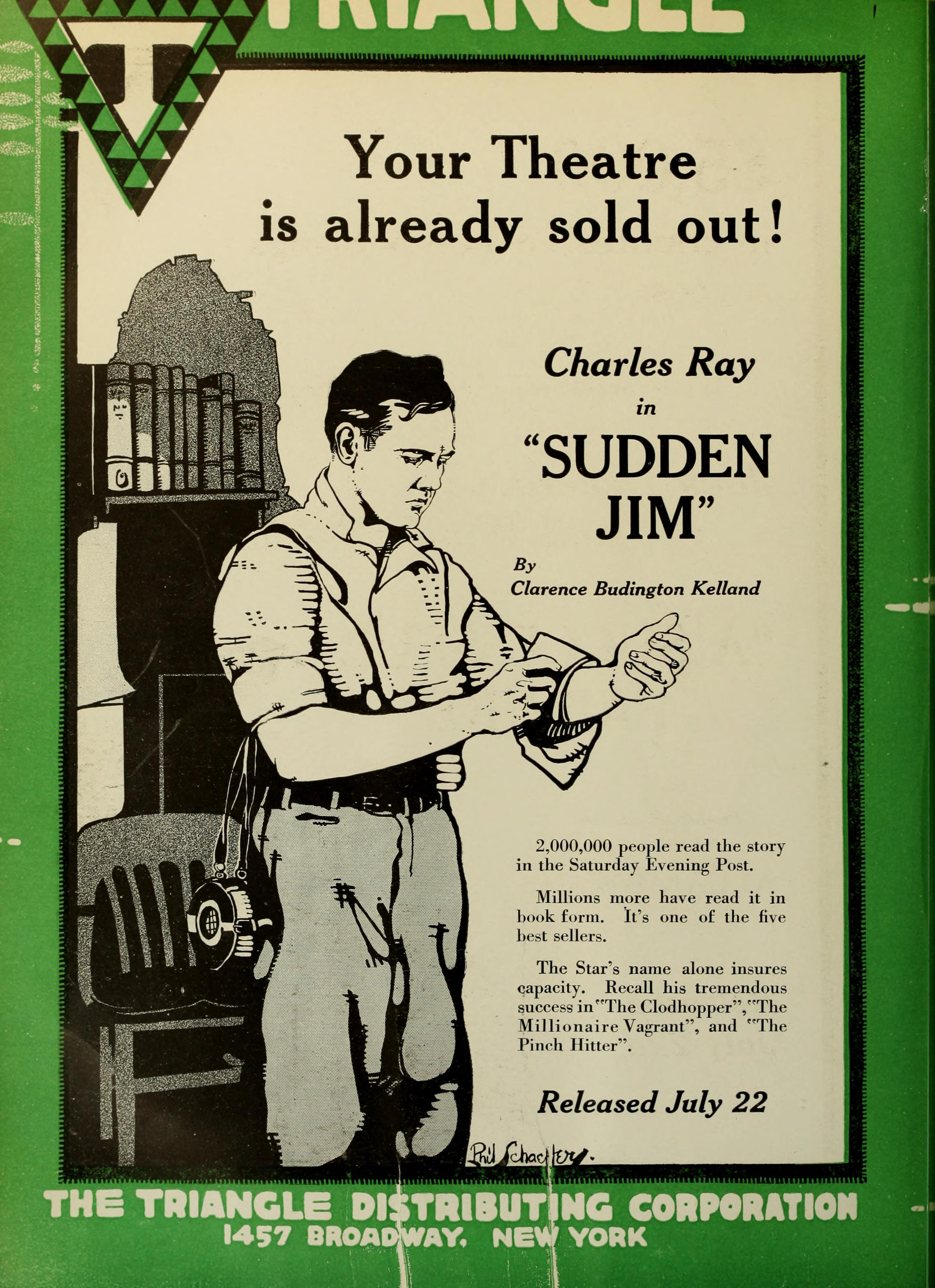
- Release poster, 1917
- Directed by: Victor Schertzinger
- Written by: Clarence Budington Kelland (novel)
- Produced by: Thomas H. Ince
- Starring: Charles Ray; Joseph J. Dowling; Sylvia Breamer
- Cinematography: Paul Eagler; Chester A. Lyons
- Production company: Triangle Film Corporation
- Distributed by: Triangle Distributing
- Release date: July 22, 1917
- Running time: 5 reels
- Country: United States
- Languages: Silent; English intertitles

Sudden Jim is a 1917 American silent drama film directed by Victor Schertzinger and starring Charles Ray, Joseph J. Dowling and Sylvia Breamer.

== Cast ==
- Charles Ray as James Ashe Jr.
- Joseph J. Dowling as Judge Zanaan Frame
- Sylvia Breamer as Marie Ducharme
- Lydia Knott as Widow Stickney
- William Ellingford as Steve Gilders
- Georgie Stone as The Kid

== Bibliography ==
- Goble, Alan. The Complete Index to Literary Sources in Film. Walter de Gruyter, 1999.
