= The Narrow Trail =

1917 film

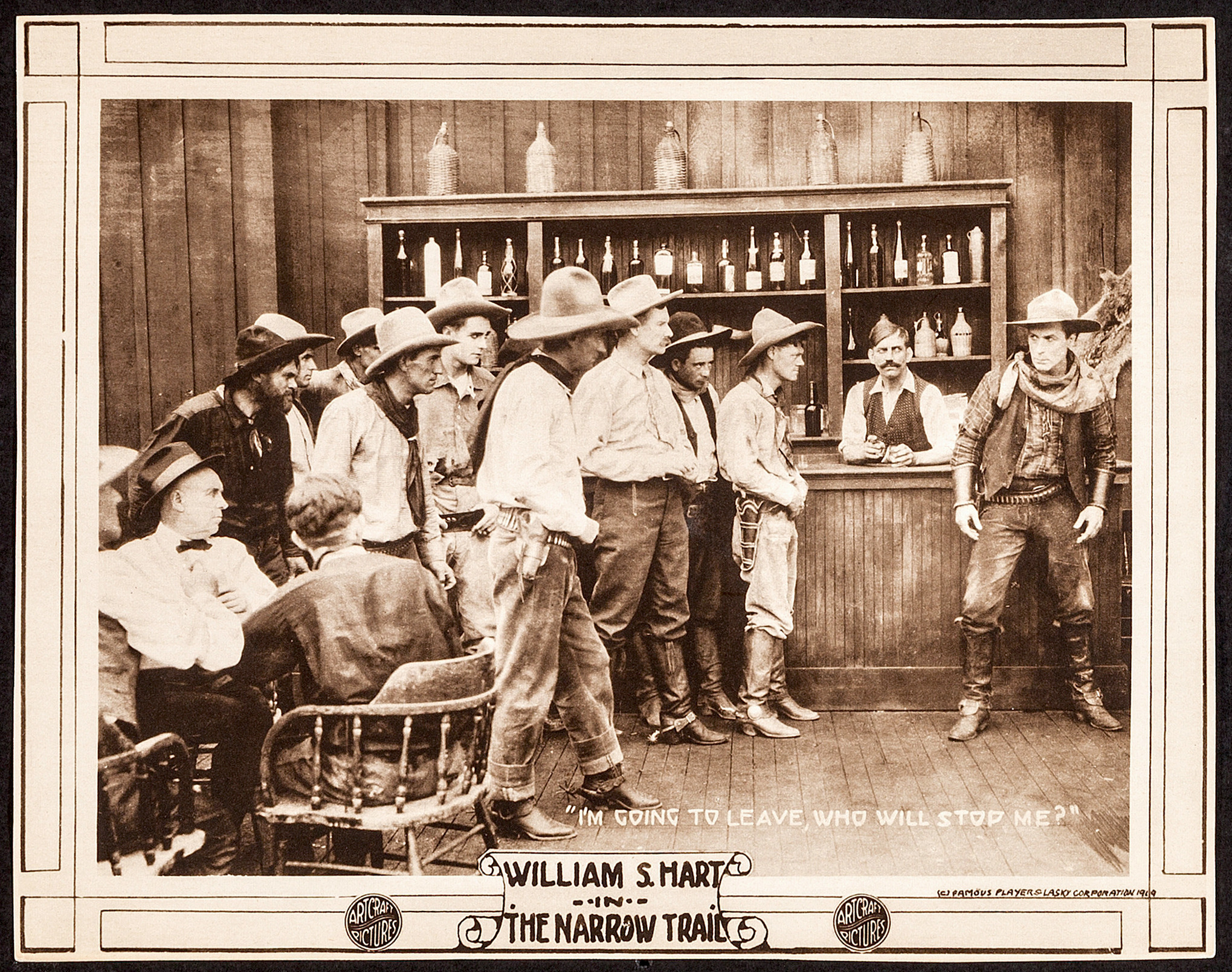
- Lobby card
- Directed by: Lambert Hillyer; William S. Hart (uncredited)
- Screenplay by: William S. Hart; Harvey F. Thew
- Produced by: Thomas H. Ince
- Starring: William S. Hart; Sylvia Breamer; Milton Ross; Bob Kortman
- Cinematography: Joseph H. August
- Production companies: Artcraft Pictures Corporation; William S. Hart Productions
- Distributed by: Paramount Pictures
- Release date: December 30, 1917
- Running time: 68 minutes
- Country: United States
- Languages: Silent; English intertitles

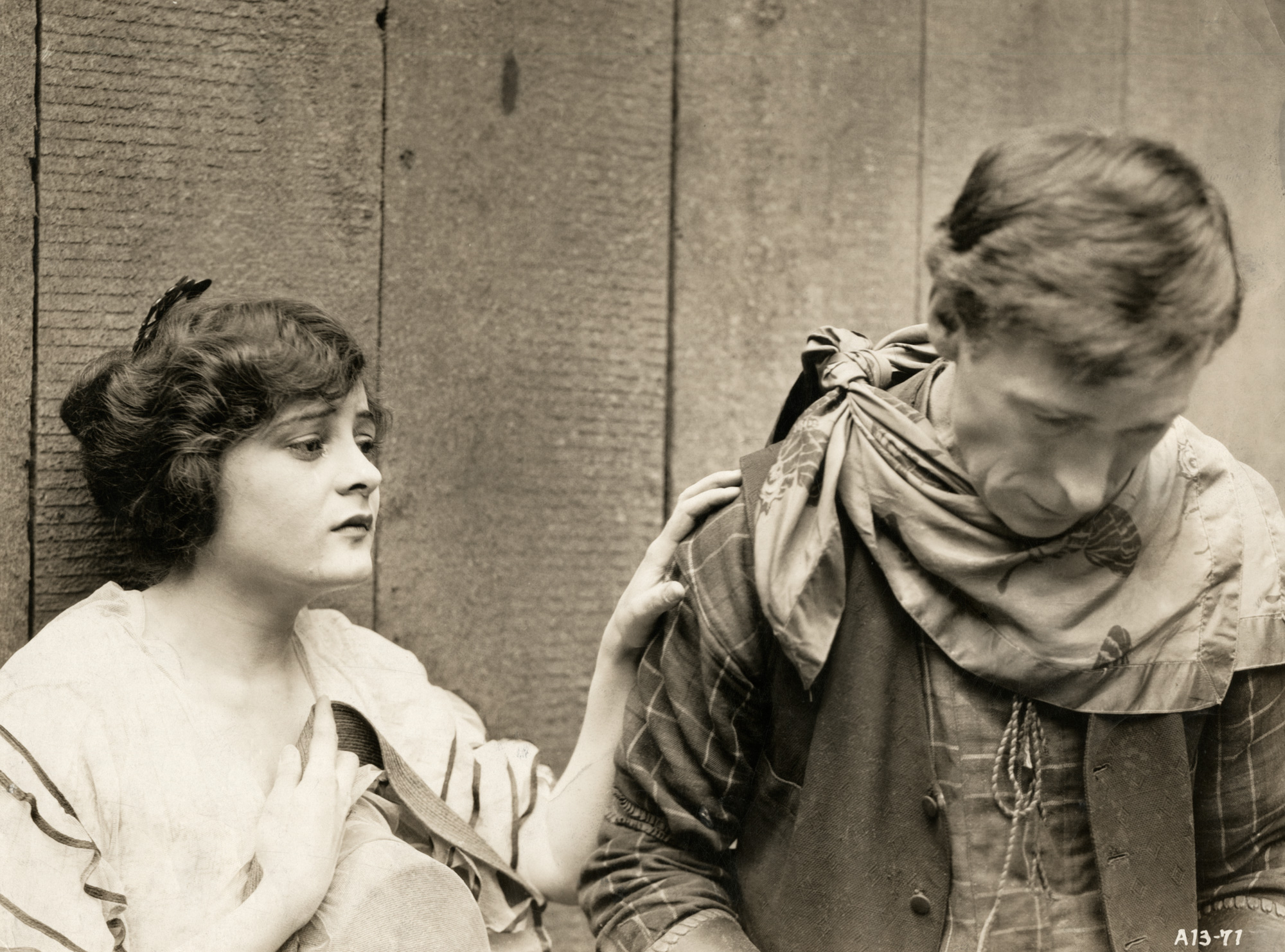
Scene with Breamer and Hart

The Narrow Trail is a 1917 American silent Western film directed by Lambert Hillyer and William S. Hart and written by William S. Hart and Harvey F. Thew. The film stars William S. Hart, Sylvia Breamer, Milton Ross, and Bob Kortman. The film was released on December 30, 1917, by Paramount Pictures.

== Plot ==
As described in a film magazine, Ice Harding, leader of a gang of outlaws, captures an attractive wild pony he names King and the two become fast friends. Single handed he holds up a stage coach and robs its occupants. Among the passengers is Bates, a notorious San Francisco dive keeper, and his niece Betty, a pretty girl, who is used to lure men to the resort. The gang, fearing capture because of the distinctive pinto horse King that Ice rides, divides up their stake and quits. Ice Harding again meets Betty in Saddle City and they become acquainted, she believing him to be a wealthy rancher. Her uncle plans to fleece Ice, and on the day she leaves to return to the city, she gives Ice a paper with a false address. Ice follows her to San Francisco and, unable to find her, he feels dejected and lonely and wanders into a Barbary Coast waterfront saloon. There he discovers Betty, who is horrified that he found her, and Ice denounces her. Ice gets into a fight with two toughs who are in the business of shanghaiing sailors, and then returns to the mountains. Betty, to get away from the dive, leaves and goes to Saddle City. Here she meets Ice, who was intending to rob a bank. They resolve to change their ways, and Ice enters his horse in a free-for-all race. His pinto horse wins, and Ice collects the $1000 prize. About to leave with Betty, Ice is confronted by the sheriff who notes the distinctive horse. Ice knocks him down, grabs up Betty, and the two ride away, outdistancing a posse that follows.

== Cast ==
- William S. Hart as Ice Harding
- Sylvia Breamer as Betty Werdin
- Milton Ross as 'Admiral' Bates
- Bob Kortman as Moose Holleran
- Fritz as King

== Survival status ==
Prints of the film are in collections at the Library of Congress, Museum of Modern Art, and George Eastman Museum Motion Picture Collection, and the film has been released on DVD.
