= Doubling for Romeo =

1921 film

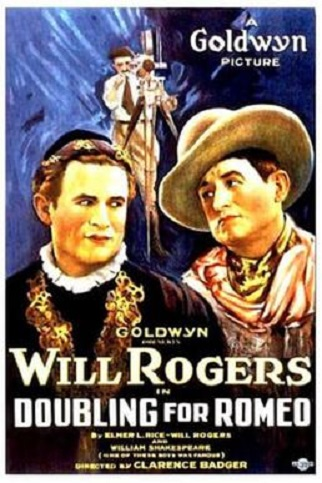
- Theatrical release poster
- Directed by: Clarence G. Badger
- Screenplay by: Bernard McConville; Elmer Rice; Will Rogers
- Produced by: Samuel Goldwyn
- Starring: Will Rogers; Sylvia Breamer; Raymond Hatton; Sidney Ainsworth; Al Hart; John Cossar
- Cinematography: Marcel Le Picard
- Production company: Goldwyn Pictures
- Distributed by: Goldwyn Pictures
- Release date: October 23, 1921
- Running time: 60 minutes
- Country: United States
- Language: Silent (English intertitles)

Doubling for Romeo is a 1921 American silent comedy film directed by Clarence G. Badger and written by Bernard McConville, Elmer Rice, and Will Rogers. The film stars Will Rogers, Sylvia Breamer, Raymond Hatton, Sidney Ainsworth, Al Hart and John Cossar. The film was released on October 23, 1921, by Goldwyn Pictures.

== Cast ==
- Will Rogers as Sam Cody / Romeo
- Sylvia Breamer as Lulu / Juliet
- Raymond Hatton as Steve Woods / Paris
- Sidney Ainsworth as Pendleton / Mercutio
- Al Hart as Big Alec / Tybalt
- John Cossar as Foster / Capulet
- Charles Thurston as Duffy Saunders / Benvolio
- Cordelia Callahan as Maggie / Maid
- Roland Rushton as Minister / Friar
- Jimmy Rogers as Jimmie Jones
- William Orlamond as Movie Director

== Preservation ==
- Prints of the film survive at Cinematheque Royale de Belgique (Brussels) and the Museum of Modern Art, New York.
