= Lightning Reporter =

1926 silent film

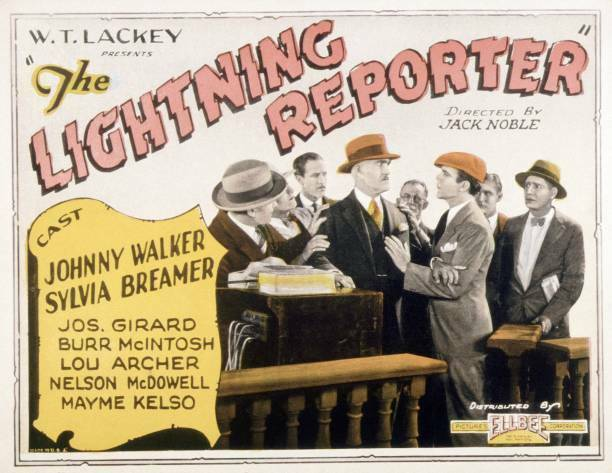
- Directed by: John W. Noble
- Written by: Tom Gibson; John W. Noble
- Produced by: William T. Lackey
- Starring: Johnnie Walker; Sylvia Breamer; Burr McIntosh
- Cinematography: Harry Davis
- Production company: W.T. Lackey Productions
- Distributed by: Ellbee Pictures
- Release date: December 10, 1926
- Running time: 60 minutes
- Country: United States
- Languages: Silent; English intertitles

Lightning Reporter is a 1926 American silent drama film directed by John W. Noble and starring Johnnie Walker, Sylvia Breamer and Burr McIntosh.

== Plot ==
Young reporter Jimmy Blaine assists railroad magnate Barlow in overcoming Hawell, a deceitful rival in the financial market. Along the way, he develops romantic feelings for Barlow's daughter.

== Cast ==
- Johnnie Walker as Jimmy Blaine – Cub Reporter
- Sylvia Breamer as Ruth Barlow
- Burr McIntosh as Mr. Barlow – Ruth's Father
- Lou Archer
- Nelson McDowell
- Joseph W. Girard
- Mayme Kelso

== Bibliography ==
- Munden, Kenneth White. The American Film Institute Catalog of Motion Pictures Produced in the United States, Part 1. University of California Press, 1997.
