= Traffic in Hearts =

1924 film

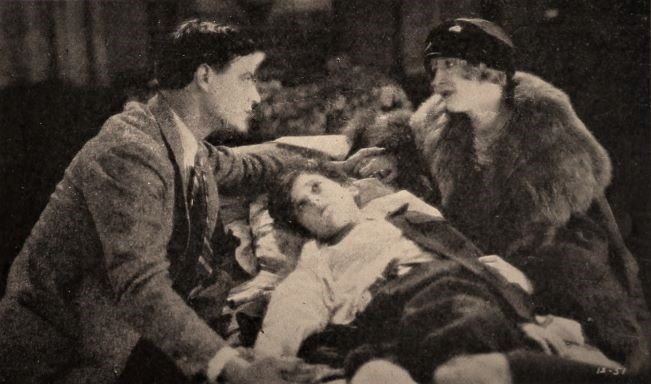
- Still with Robert Frazer, Mildred Harris, and Marion Feducha
- Directed by: Scott R. Dunlap
- Written by: Jack Stone; Dorothy Yost
- Starring: Robert Frazer; Mildred Harris; Marion Feducha
- Cinematography: Lucien N. Andriot
- Production company: Columbia Pictures
- Distributed by: Columbia Pictures
- Release date: May 23, 1924
- Running time: 57 minutes
- Country: United States
- Language: Silent (English intertitles)

Traffic in Hearts is a 1924 American silent drama film directed by Scott R. Dunlap and starring Robert Frazer, Mildred Harris, and Marion Feducha.

== Synopsis ==
A man plans to build modern tenement buildings, but is opposed by his girlfriend's father who has a vested interest in preventing change.

== Cast ==
- Robert Frazer as Lawrence Hallor
- Mildred Harris as Alice Hamilton
- Marion Feducha as Shrimp
- Charles Wellesley as John Hamilton
- John Herdman as Dad Clark
- Betty Morrissey as Jerry

== Preservation ==
A lost film.

== Bibliography ==
- Munden, Kenneth White. The American Film Institute Catalog of Motion Pictures Produced in the United States, Part 1. University of California Press, 1997.
