= Lady of the Night (1925 film) =

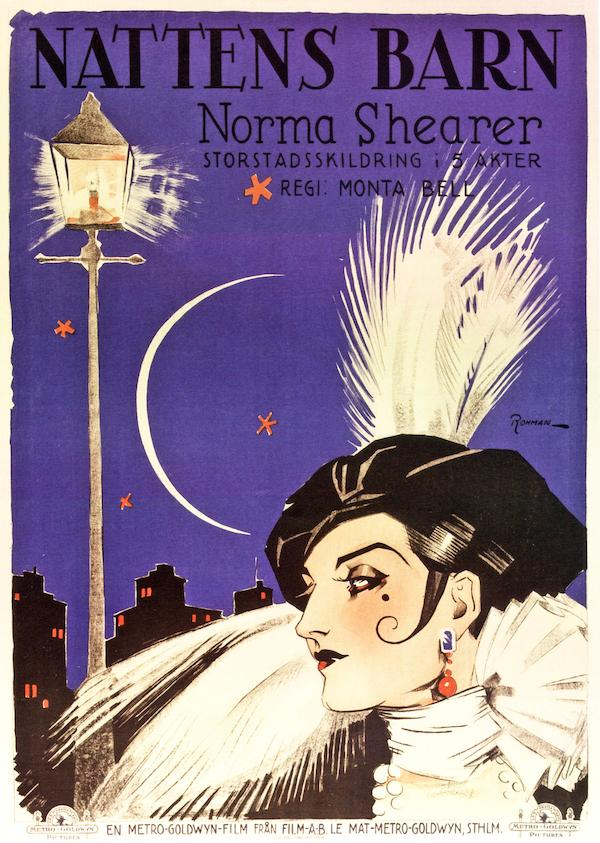
- Swedish poster
- Directed by: Monta Bell
- Written by: Alice D. G. Miller (scenario)
- Story by: Adela Rogers St. Johns
- Produced by: Louis B. Mayer
- Starring: Norma Shearer
- Cinematography: André Barlatier (fr)
- Edited by: Ralph Dawson
- Distributed by: Metro-Goldwyn-Mayer
- Release date: February 23, 1925 (United States)
- Running time: 62 minutes
- Country: United States
- Language: Silent (English intertitles)

Lady of the Night is a 1925 American silent romantic drama film directed by Monta Bell. The film stars Norma Shearer in a dual role. A print of Lady of the Night exists in the film holdings of the Mary Pickford Institute for Film Education.

== Plot ==
Chris Helmer is sentenced to 20 years in prison by Judge Banning, and has to leave his wife and baby girl. By coincidence, the judge has a daughter about the same age.

Eighteen years later, the two now motherless young women graduate, Florence Banning from an exclusive private school, Molly Helmer from reform school. Molly and her two friends become taxi dancers. One day, Molly rejects the advances of a stranger at the dance hall where she works. When her boyfriend, "Chunky" Dunn, tries to defend her, he gets knocked down. She is rescued by Chunky's friend, inventor David Page, and falls in love with him. David is oblivious to this and only sees her as a good pal. The more perceptive Chunky becomes increasingly jealous.

David perfects a device that can open any safe. Chunky tells him that he knows a gang of crooks who would pay a lot of money for it, but Molly tells him that crime does not pay. David shows his invention to the directors of a bank, Judge Banning being one. They are impressed and purchase it. As he is leaving the meeting, David bumps into Florence. She too falls for him. Soon, they are dating, much to the displeasure of Florence's spinster aunt. However, when Florence meets Molly by accident at David's workshop, she can see that Molly also loves David. She tells David that Molly has a greater claim to him and breaks up with him. When she gets into her limousine however, she finds Molly there waiting for her. Molly urges her to marry David, thinking only of his happiness. To fool David into believing she never loved him, Molly accepts Chunky's standing offer of marriage.

== Cast ==
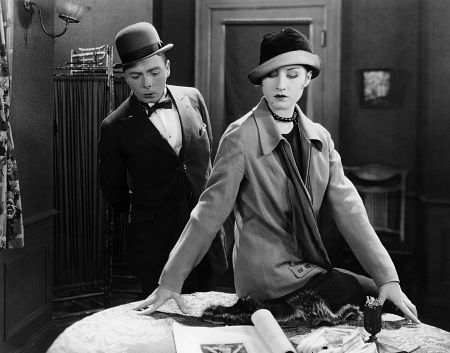
Chunky and Molly examine a fashion magazine.

- Norma Shearer as Molly Helmer/Florence Banning
- Malcolm McGregor as David Page
- Dale Fuller as Miss Carr
- George K. Arthur as "Chunky" Dunn
- Fred Esmelton as Judge Banning
- Lew Harvey as Chris Helmer, Molly's father
- Gwen Lee as Molly's friend
- Betty Morrissey as Gertie, Molly's friend
- Carlton Griffin (uncredited bit)
- Julian Rivero (uncredited bit)
- Constantine Romanoff (uncredited bit)
- Philip Sleeman (uncredited bit)
- Aryel Houwink as "the Sharpie" (uncredited)
- Joan Crawford as uncredited body double for Shearer

== Box office ==
The film grossed a total (domestic and foreign) of $326,000: $235,000 from the U.S. and Canada and $91,000 elsewhere, resulting in a profit of $96,000.
