= What Shall I Do? =

1924 film

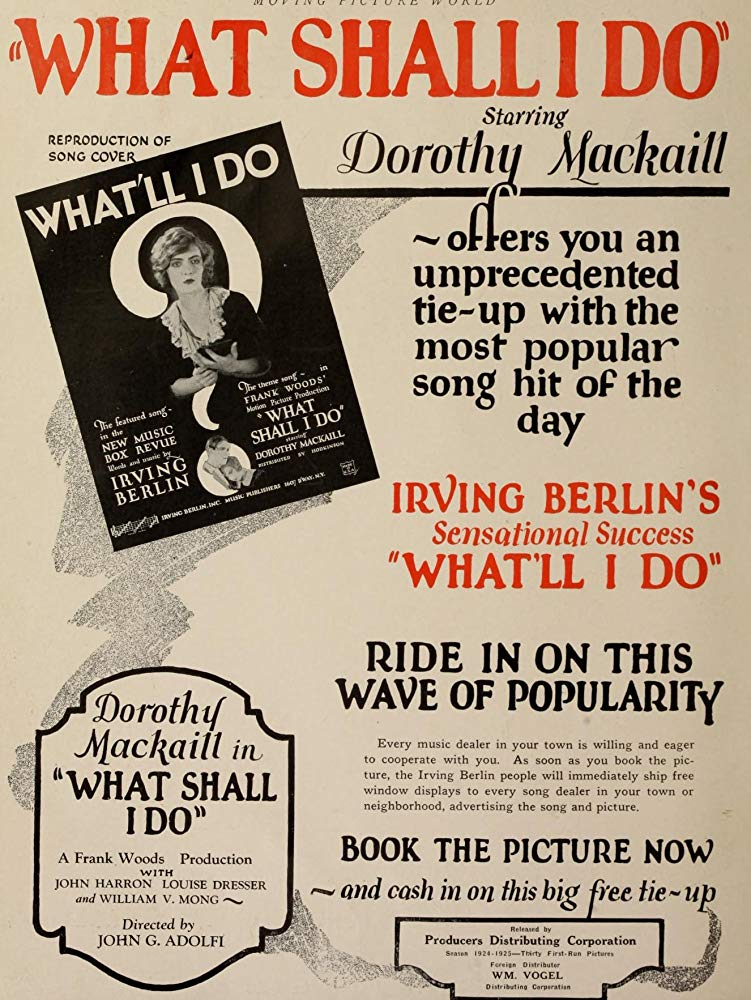
- Directed by: John G. Adolfi
- Written by: Frank E. Woods
- Starring: Dorothy Mackaill; John Harron; Louise Dresser
- Cinematography: Joseph Walker
- Distributed by: W. W. Hodkinson Corporation
- Release date: May 11, 1924
- Running time: 60 minutes
- Country: United States
- Language: Silent (English intertitles)

What Shall I Do? is a 1924 American silent drama film directed by John G. Adolfi and starring Dorothy Mackaill, John Harron, and Louise Dresser.

== Synopsis ==
After an accident, a man suffers from amnesia and leaves his wife and child to return to his old life.

== Cast ==
- Dorothy Mackaill as Jeanie Andrews
- John Harron as Jack Nelson
- Louise Dresser as Mrs. McLean
- William V. Mong as Henry McLean
- Betty Morrissey as Dolly McLean
- Ann May as Mary Conway
- Ralph McCullough as Tom Conway
- Joan Standing as Lizzie
- Tom O'Brien as Big Jim Brown

== Preservation ==
With no copies of What Shall I Do? located in any film archives, it is a lost film.

== Bibliography ==
- Munden, Kenneth White. The American Film Institute Catalog of Motion Pictures Produced in the United States, Part 1. University of California Press, 1997.
