= Unseen Forces =

1920 film

- Theatrical release poster
- Directed by: Sidney A. Franklin
- Written by: Bennett Cohen
- Based on: Athalie by Robert W. Chambers
- Produced by: Sidney A. Franklin
- Starring: Sylvia Breamer; Conrad Nagel
- Cinematography: David Abel
- Production company: Mayflower Photoplay Company
- Distributed by: Associated First National Pictures
- Release date: November 29, 1920
- Running time: 60 minutes

Unseen Forces is a 1920 American silent drama film directed by Sidney A. Franklin and starring Sylvia Breamer and Conrad Nagel. It is based on the 1915 novel Athalie by Robert W. Chambers.

It was produced by the same production company that produced The Miracle Man the year before, Mayflower Photoplay Company and was distributed by Associated First National Pictures on November 29, 1920.

== Cast ==
- Sylvia Breamer as Miriam Holt
- Rosemary Theby as Winifred
- Conrad Nagel as Clyde Brunton
- Robert Cain as Arnold Crane
- Sam De Grasse as Captain Stanley
- Edward Martindel as George Brunton
- Harry Garrity as Peter Holt
- James O. Barrows as Joe Simmons
- Aggie Herring as Mrs. Leslie
- Andrew Arbuckle as Mr. Leslie
- Albert R. Cody as Henry Leslie

== Preservation ==
It was long thought to be lost until an complete print was found in the New Zealand archive with a copy repatriated to the Library of Congress.
