= A Man of Nerve =

1925 film

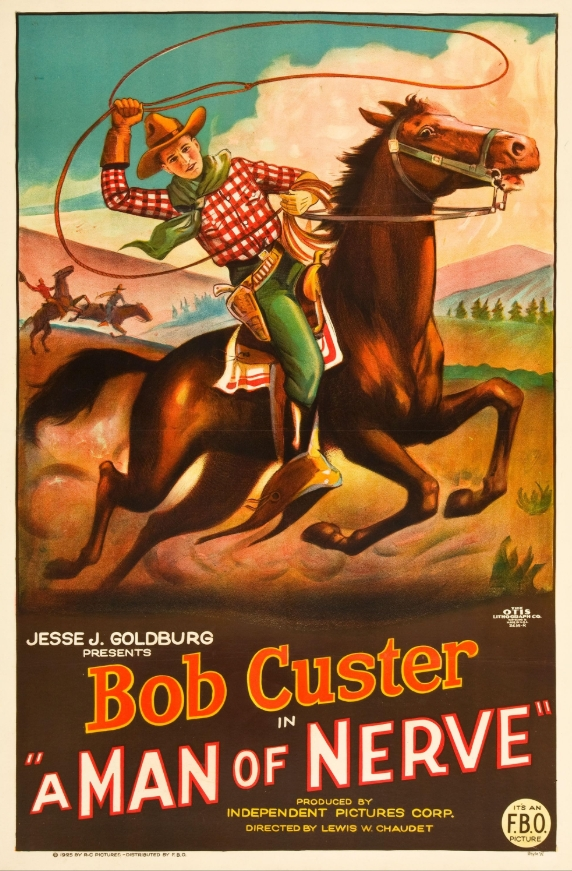
- Directed by: Louis Chaudet
- Written by: John Harold Hamlin; George Hively
- Produced by: Jesse J. Goldburg
- Starring: Bob Custer; Jean Arthur; David Dunbar
- Cinematography: Allen M. Davey
- Production company: Robertson-Cole Pictures Corporation
- Distributed by: Film Booking Offices of America
- Release date: November 3, 1925
- Running time: 50 minutes
- Country: United States
- Languages: Silent; English intertitles

A Man of Nerve is a 1925 American silent Western film directed by Louis Chaudet and starring Bob Custer, Jean Arthur and David Dunbar. It was distributed by Film Booking Offices of America, a forerunner of RKO Pictures.

== Cast ==
- Bob Custer as Hackamore Henderson
- Jean Arthur as Loria Gatlin
- Leon Holmes as Buddy Simms
- David Dunbar as Rangey Greer
- Buck Moulton as Bandit
- Ralph McCullough as Art Gatlin

== Bibliography ==
- Connelly, Robert B. The Silents: Silent Feature Films, 1910-36, Volume 40, Issue 2. December Press, 1998.
- Munden, Kenneth White. The American Film Institute Catalog of Motion Pictures Produced in the United States, Part 1. University of California Press, 1997.
- Oller, John. Jean Arthur: The Actress Nobody Knew. Limelight Editions, 1999.
- Rainey, Buck. Sweethearts of the Sage: Biographies and Filmographies of 258 actresses appearing in Western movies. McFarland & Company, 1992.
