= Bernadine Anderson =

American makeup artist (born 1942)

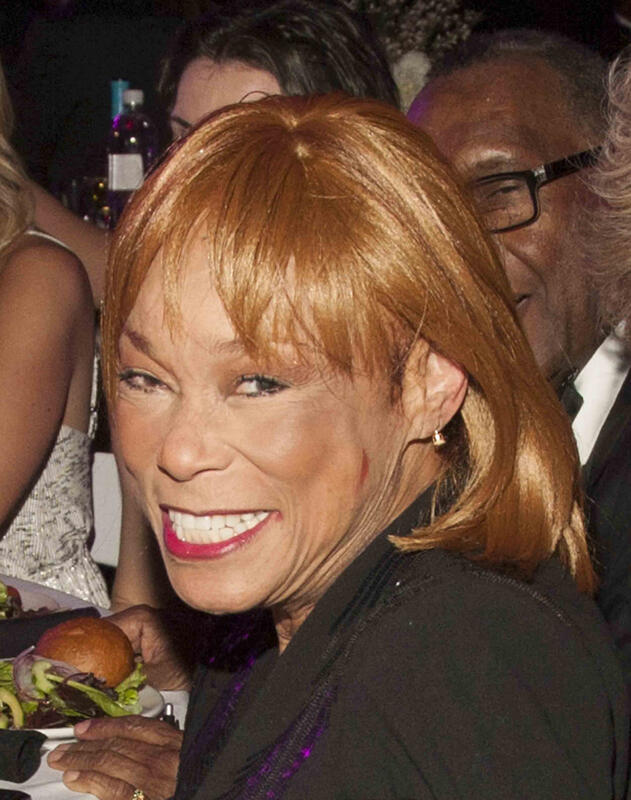
- Anderson in 2015
- Born: December 1, 1942 (age 83); New York City, US
- Occupation: Make-up artist
- Years active: 1967–1994

Bernadine M. Anderson (born December 1, 1942) is a retired American makeup artist and the first black woman to work as a makeup artist in the Hollywood film industry. In 1967, she filed a lawsuit against employment discrimination and was accepted into a 3-year apprenticeship at Warner Bros. Studio. In 1970, she was accepted into the local union, IATSE 706, making her the first black female member of the makeup department.

== Life and career ==
Anderson was born on December 1, 1942, in New York City. In New York, Anderson worked for an undertaker to put herself through college; she did makeup on corpses as a mortuary cosmetologist.

In the 1960s, after four years of trying to get into the industry, Anderson filed a class action lawsuit against the film studios for discrimination. The lawsuit was dropped because she was offered a three-year apprenticeship with Warner Bros. Studio beginning in 1967. During the apprenticeship, Anderson worked on Planet of the Apes.

In 1973, Anderson was the only woman and the only black person working as a makeup artist in the Hollywood film industry, according to film producer Robert Rosen.

Anderson became Jane Fonda's personal makeup artist in 1975. Fonda called the union and requested a female makeup artist, and Anderson was the only one. Anderson worked with Fonda on films such as Fun with Dick and Jane, 9 to 5, and Julia. Anderson would go on to become Eddie Murphy's personal makeup artist through the 1980s and 1990s and worked on films like Harlem Nights, Boomerang, and Coming to America, where she was the makeup designer and department head. Throughout her career, she worked with the likes of Cicely Tyson, Stevie Wonder, Lionel Richie, Laurence Fishburne, and Angela Bassett.

Anderson retired from the film industry in 1994. Her makeup kit is now on display at the Smithsonian's National Museum of African American History and Culture in Washington D.C.

== Accolades ==
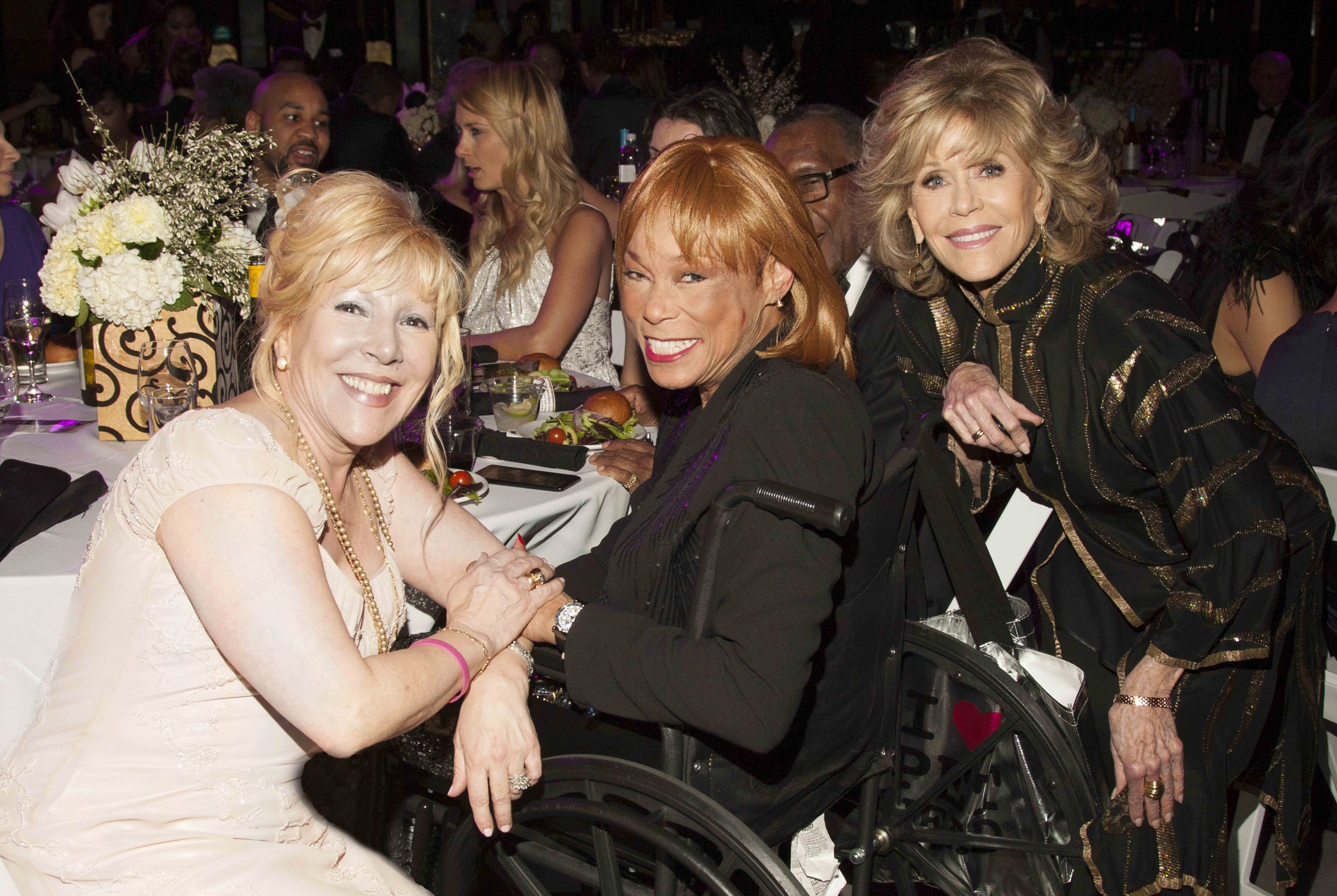
Michele Elyzabeth, Bernadine M. Anderson (center), and Jane Fonda at the first Hollywood Beauty Awards in 2015

In 2015, the first Hollywood Beauty Awards honored Anderson with an Outstanding Achievement in Makeup award for her contribution to the film industry. It was presented to her by Jane Fonda.

In 2021, the Makeup Artists and Hair Stylists Guild honored her with their Vanguard Award. In 2015, she was nominated for their Lifetime Achievement Award.

In 2025, Dread Central listed Anderson as one of "The 7 Most Influential Black Women in Special Effects Makeup History" for her work on Wes Craven's 1995 film Vampire in Brooklyn.

== See also ==
- Dorothy Ponedel, the first female makeup artist in the Hollywood film industry
