= Arthur Reeves (cinematographer) =

American cinematographer

- Born: May 1, 1892; Illinois, United States
- Died: October 10, 1954 (aged 62); Hollywood, California, United States
- Occupation: Cinematographer
- Years active: 1915–1930 (film)

Arthur Reeves (1892–1954) was an American cinematographer active in the silent and early sound era. He began his career at the Chicago-based Essanay and went on to work for a variety of other studios including Metro, Universal and FBO Pictures.

== Selected filmography ==
- The Alster Case (1915)
- The Misleading Lady (1916)
- That Sort (1916)
- The Havoc (1916)
- The Small Town Guy (1917)
- Two-Bit Seats (1917)
- Ruggles of Red Gap (1918)
- A Pair of Sixes (1918)
- The Misfit Wife (1920)
- The Greater Claim (1921)
- Any Night (1922)
- Out of the Silent North (1922)
- The Man Who Married His Own Wife (1922)
- The Galloping Kid (1922)
- Afraid to Fight (1922)
- Ashes (1922)
- Wild Bill Hickok (1923)
- Pride of Sunshine Alley (1924)
- Galloping Vengeance (1925)
- The Range Terror (1925)
- The Bloodhound (1925)
- That Man Jack! (1925)
- The Fighting Boob (1926)
- The Dead Line (1926)
- Man Rustlin' (1926)
- The Test of Donald Norton (1926)
- The Power of the Weak (1926)
- The Mile-a-Minute Man (1926)
- Broadway Madness (1927)
- The Arizona Whirlwind (1927)
- A Bowery Cinderella (1927)
- Satan and the Woman (1928)
- The Stronger Will (1928)
- Women Who Dare (1928)
- Untamed Justice (1929)
- The Phantom of the North (1929)
- The Swellhead (1930)
- Wings of Adventure (1930)
- Sunny Skies (1930)
- The Medicine Man (1930)
- Sunny (1930)

== Bibliography ==
- Morris, Peter. Embattled Shadows: A History of Canadian Cinema, 1895-1939. McGill-Queen's Press - MQUP, 1992.
- Soister, John T., Nicolella, Henry & Joyce, Steve. American Silent Horror, Science Fiction and Fantasy Feature Films, 1913-1929. McFarland, 2014.
