= Galloping Vengeance =

1925 film

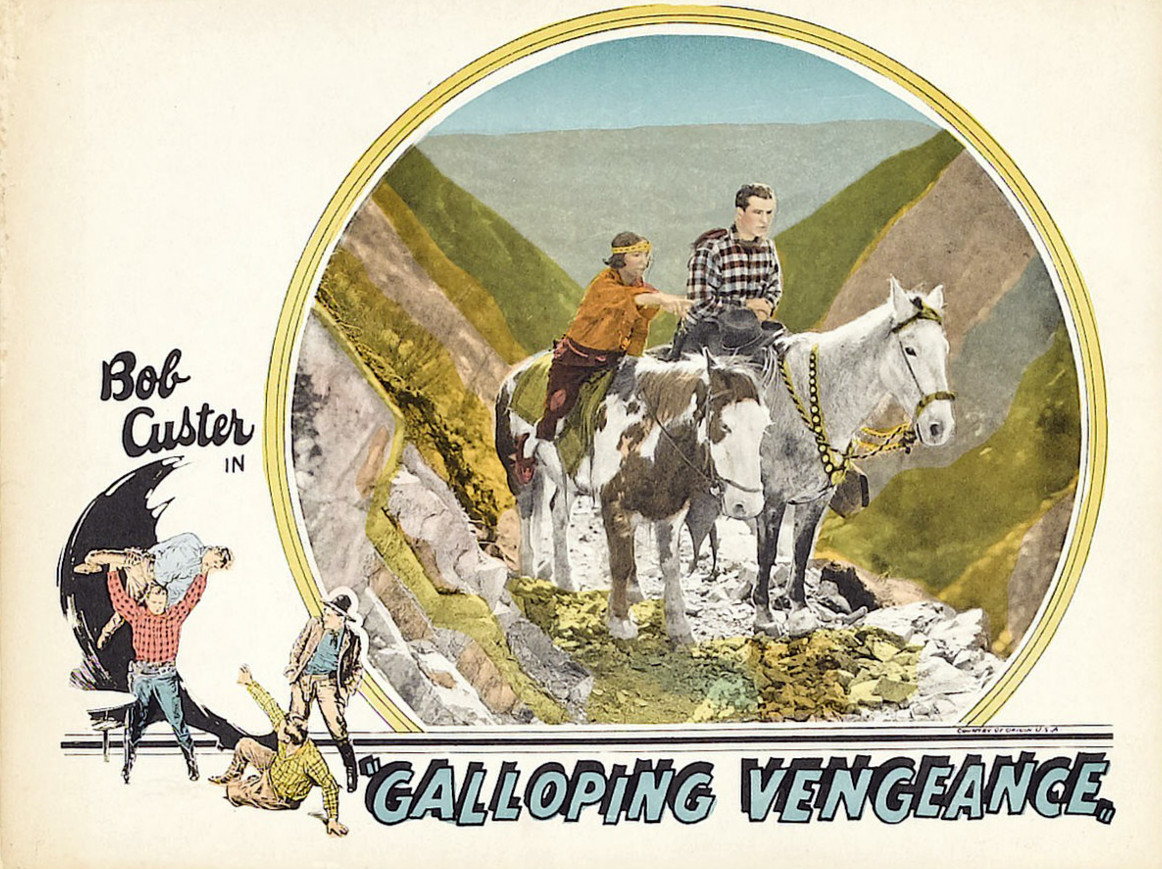
- Lobby card
- Directed by: William James Craft
- Written by: William Berke
- Produced by: Jesse J. Goldburg
- Starring: Bob Custer; Mary Beth Milford; Ralph McCullough
- Cinematography: Arthur Reeves
- Production company: Independent Pictures
- Distributed by: Film Booking Offices of America
- Release date: March 8, 1925
- Running time: 50 minutes
- Country: United States
- Language: Silent (English intertitles)

Galloping Vengeance is a lost 1925 American silent Western film directed by William James Craft and starring Bob Custer, Mary Beth Milford, and Ralph McCullough.

== Plot ==
As described in a film magazine review, Texas Ranger Tom Hardy is assigned to find an Indian chief who has been kidnapped by Duke Granby and his gang, who seek valuable oil lands. Jack Reeves, brother of Marion with whom Tom is in love, becomes mixed up with Granby. During a fight a man is killed and Jack is made to believe that he killed the man. Tom finds the chief, forces Granby to confess to the murder, and rescues Marion from a torrent caused when one of Granby's men dynamites a dam.

== Cast ==
- Bob Custer as Tom Hardy
- Mary Beth Milford as Marion Reeves
- Ralph McCullough as Jack Reeves
- Dorothy Ponedel as Little Wolf
- David Dunbar as Duke Granby

== Preservation ==
With no holdings located in archives, Galloping Vengeance is considered a lost film.
