= Ralph McCullough =

American actor

- Born: September 2, 1895; Laramie, Wyoming, United States
- Died: December 25, 1943 (aged 48); Los Angeles, California, United States
- Occupation: Actor
- Years active: 1920–1943 (film)

Ralph McCullough (1895–1943) was an American film actor of the silent era who occasionally played male leads as well as more numerous supporting roles. Later in his career he mostly appeared in smaller, often uncredited, roles in the sound era.

== Selected filmography ==
- A Man from Nowhere (1920)
- Homer Comes Home (1920)
- One Hour Before Dawn (1920)
- Across the Divide (1921)
- The Man Trackers (1921)
- Seven Years Bad Luck (1921)
- The Swamp (1921)
- Top o' the Morning (1922)
- Don't Get Personal (1922)
- The Veiled Woman (1922)
- Smudge (1922)
- The Angel of Crooked Street (1922)
- His Mystery Girl (1923)
- The Steel Trail (1923)
- The Red Warning (1923)
- Wanted by the Law (1924)
- What Shall I Do? (1924)
- A Man of Nerve (1925)
- High and Handsome (1925)
- The Bloodhound (1925)
- Galloping Vengeance (1925)
- Speed Wild (1925)
- Passionate Youth (1925)
- The Stolen Ranch (1926)
- With Davy Crockett at the Fall of the Alamo (1926)
- The Great Hotel Murder (1935)
- Code of the Range (1936)
- The Cowboy Star (1936)
- Find the Witness (1937)
- Sophie Lang Goes West (1937)
- Paradise Express (1937)
- Pioneers of the Frontier (1940)

== Bibliography ==
- Katchmer, George A. A Biographical Dictionary of Silent Film Western Actors and Actresses. McFarland, 2015.
