= Sylvia Breamer =

Australian actress (1897–1943)

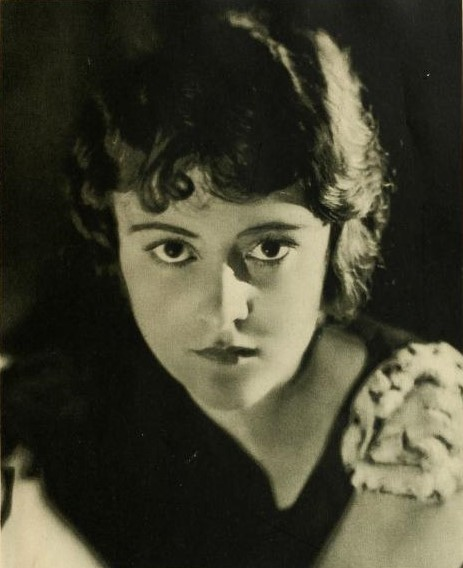
- Breamer, 1924
- Born: Sylvia Poppy Bremer; 9 June 1897; Sydney, Australia
- Died: 7 June 1943 (aged 45); New York City, U.S.
- Occupation: Actress
- Spouses: E.W. Morrison (m. 1914; div. 1917) Dr. Harry Martin (m. 1924; div. 1926) Edmund R. Bohan (m. 1931; div. 1940)

Sylvia Poppy Bremer (9 June 1897 – 7 June 1943), known professionally as Sylvia Breamer, was an Australian actress who appeared in American silent motion pictures beginning in 1917.

== Childhood and early career in Australia ==
Sylvia Poppy Bremer was born on 9 June 1897 in the Sydney suburb of Double Bay, to Frederick Glasse Bremer and Jessie Bremer (née Platt). She had a sister named Doris, who later married actor William J. Kelly.

From a young age she trained for the stage with Walter Bentley and later at a Sydney Dramatic school run by Douglas Ancelon and Stella Chapman. She started to appear at recitations and on stage from the age of 13, soon after in productions for J. C. Williamson throughout Australia and New Zealand. The Manly Biographical Dictionary project reports that Bremer lived with her mother Jessie and step-father, Arthur George Crook Plunkett on the East Esplanade, Manly, in the early 1910s. By 1915 she had come to the notice of reviewers, particularly after she stood in for Muriel Starr in a lead role in the Sydney run of George Broadhurst's play, Bought and Paid for. By this time she was also famous enough to appear in newspaper advertisements for "Clement's Tonic." In 1914 Bremer married 46 year old E.W. Morrison, an American actor-director who regularly worked for J.C.Williamson. Like her Australian contemporary Enid Bennett, she determined to try her luck in the United States, and the couple departed for San Francisco in October 1916. The marriage appears to have been short lived however and Morrison returned to Australia in February 1917 without her.

== Silent screen actress ==
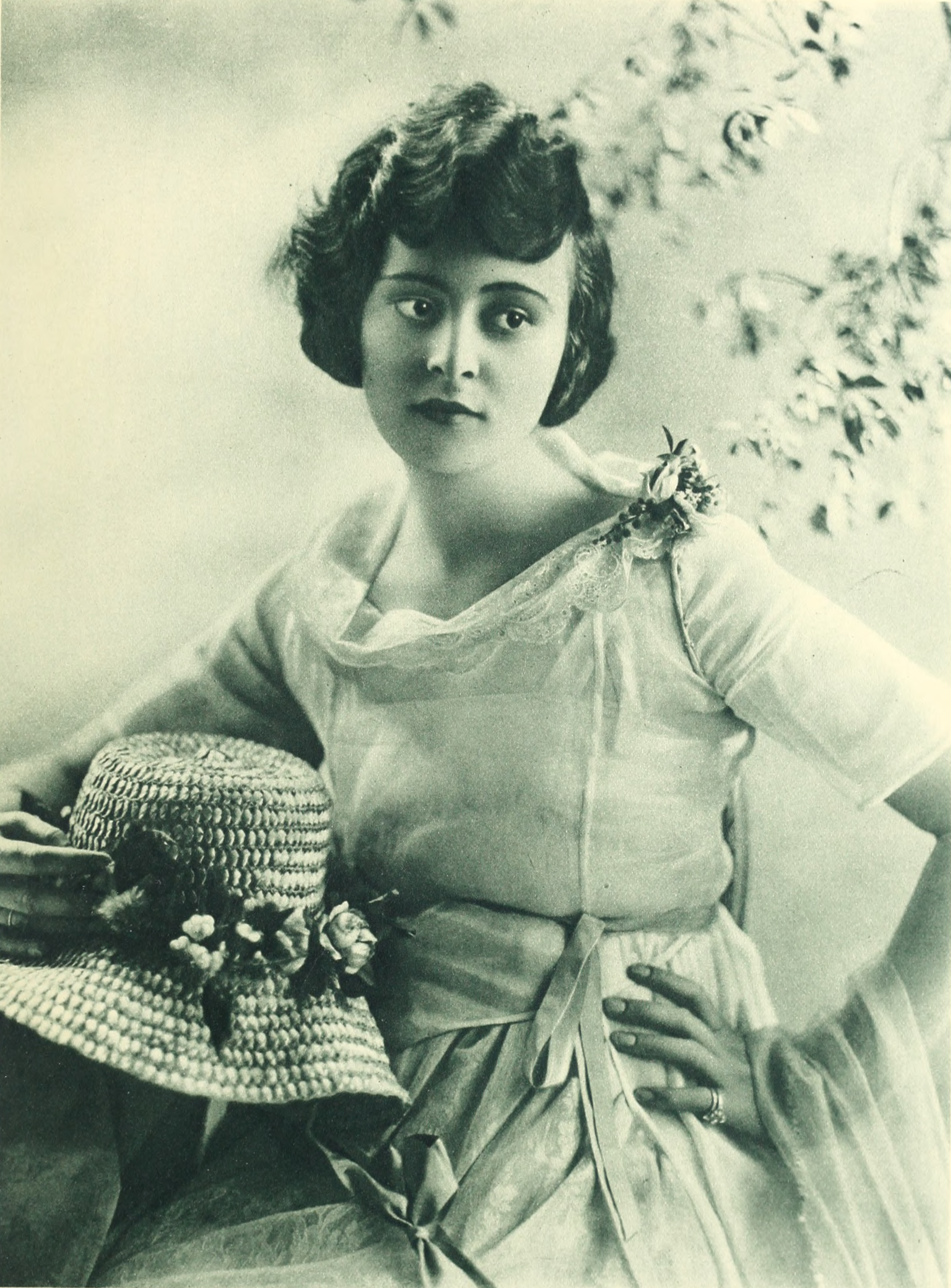
Sylvia Breamer in Photoplay, 1918.

Within a few months of arriving in the US, Breamer had appeared on stage in Boston and been tested by Thomas H. Ince.

Her first movie for Ince was The Pinch Hitter, released in April 1917, where she took the leading female role next to Charles Ray. In 1918, she changed the spelling of her surname to Breamer, apparently to sound less German. After Ince left the Triangle Film Corporation, she made numerous films for a variety of producers, including Ince and J. Stuart Blackton and opposite leading men including William S. Hart, Will Rogers, John Gilbert, Frank Mayo and Wallace Beery. Her film output was significant - she had appeared in forty films by 1924 and was an established and bankable star. In 1917 Ince had "predicted a future for Sylvia Breamer equally brilliant to that of his first Australian acquisition, Enid Bennett; and the initial assessment was, as the Lone Hand put it, that she "surpassed Bennett as actress by a long way." Breamer's final leading role in a film was in Lightning Reporter, in 1926, opposite Johnnie Walker. When no further film roles came her way she returned to the stage, appearing in a number of plays in 1926–30.

In the early 1930s she famously criticized life and work in Hollywood. She reportedly said she "now loathes pictures and everything Hollywood means. There can be no real friendship in Hollywood - nothing but jealousy and sham."

She had one minor role in a talkie, a supporting part in the 1936 Frances Farmer, Lester Matthews vehicle Too Many Parents.

== Personal life and death ==
Breamer's sister Doris joined her in the United States in the 1920s, marrying actor William J. Kelly in 1925. Breamer's mother and step-father also moved to the US in the early 1920s.

On 1 November 1924 Breamer married Dr. Harry Martin at the Glenwood Inn in Riverside, California, announcing she would be retiring from films. Their divorce in 1926 was acrimonious and public, with Martin accusing her of cruelty. Martin later went on to a long marriage to the columnist Louella Parsons.

In 1931, Breamer's engagement to actor Douglas Wood was announced, but it appears the marriage did not eventuate. In 1940, she was again in the news following a dispute over money after a divorce from aspiring politician Edmund R. Bohan.

She died in her apartment in the Royalton Hotel on 7 June 1943 as a result of a heart attack.

== Partial filmography ==
- The Pinch Hitter (1917)
- Sudden Jim (1917)
- The Cold Deck (1917) *incomplete
- The Narrow Trail (1917)
- The Millionaire Vagrant (1917)
- The Family Skeleton (1918)
- Missing (1918)
- We Can't Have Everything (1918) *lost film
- The Temple of Dusk (1918) *lost film
- A House Divided (1919)
- The Common Cause (1919) *lost film
- My Lady's Garter (1919) *lost film
- The Blood Barrier (1920)
- My Husband's Other Wife (1920)
- Unseen Forces (1920)
- Respectable by Proxy (1920)
- The Devil (1921)
- Doubling for Romeo (1921)
- A Poor Relation (1921)
- Not Guilty (1921)
- The Face Between (1922)
- Wolf Law (1922)
- The Man Who Married His Own Wife (1922)
- Sherlock Brown (1922)
- Calvert's Valley (1922)
- The Man Unconquerable (1922)
- Bavu (1923)
- Thundergate (1923)
- The Barefoot Boy (1923)
- The Girl of the Golden West (1923) *lost film
- Flaming Youth (1923) *lost film, only one reel survives
- The First Degree *was considered lost until found in June 2020
- Her Temporary Husband (1923) *lost film
- Reckless Romance (1924)
- Lilies of the Field (1924) *lost film
- The Woman on the Jury (1924) *lost film
- Too Much Youth (1925)
- Women and Gold (1925)
- Lightning Reporter (1926)
- Up in Mabel's Room (1926)
- Too Many Parents (1936)
