= The Love Racket =

1929 film directed by William A. Seiter

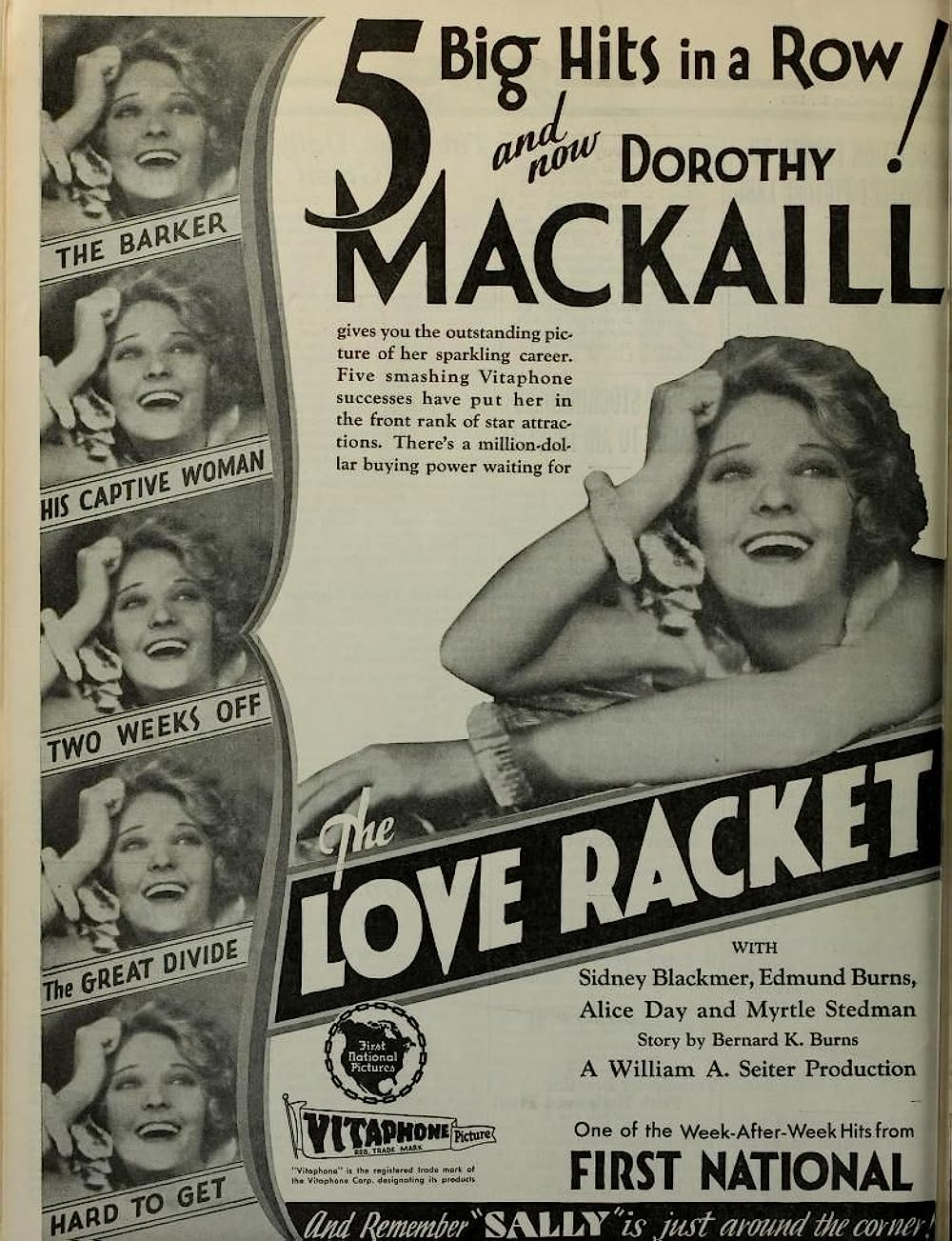
- Directed by: William A. Seiter
- Written by: Adele Comandini; John F. Goodrich
- Based on: The Woman on the Jury by Bernard K. Burns
- Starring: Dorothy Mackaill
- Cinematography: Sidney Hickox
- Edited by: John Rawlins
- Music by: Cecil Copping; Alois Reiser
- Production company: First National Pictures
- Distributed by: First National Pictures
- Release date: December 8, 1929 (United States)
- Running time: 74 minutes
- Country: United States
- Language: English

The Love Racket is a 1929 American sound (All-Talking) crime drama film produced and distributed by First National Pictures. It was directed by William A. Seiter and starred Dorothy Mackaill. It is based on a Broadway play, The Woman on the Jury by Bernard K. Burns, and is a remake of a 1924 silent film of the same name which starred Bessie Love. The film is now considered lost.

Myrtle Stedman reprises her role from the 1924 silent version in this film.

== Cast ==
- Dorothy Mackaill as Betty Brown
- Sidney Blackmer as Fred Masters
- Edmund Burns as George Wayne
- Myrtle Stedman as Marion Masters
- Edwards Davis as Judge Davis
- Webster Campbell as Prosecuting Attorney
- Clarence Burton as Defense Attorney
- Alice Day as Grace Pierce
- Edith Yorke as Mrs. Pierce
- Martha Mattox as Mrs. Slade
- Tom Mahoney as Detective McGuire
- Jack Curtis as John Gerrity

== Music ==
The film featured a theme song entitled "Because You Belong To Me" which was composed by Felix Bernard, Stanley F. Weiner and J. Warren Morse.

== See also ==
- List of early sound feature films (1926–1929)
