= The Arizona Whirlwind =

1927 film

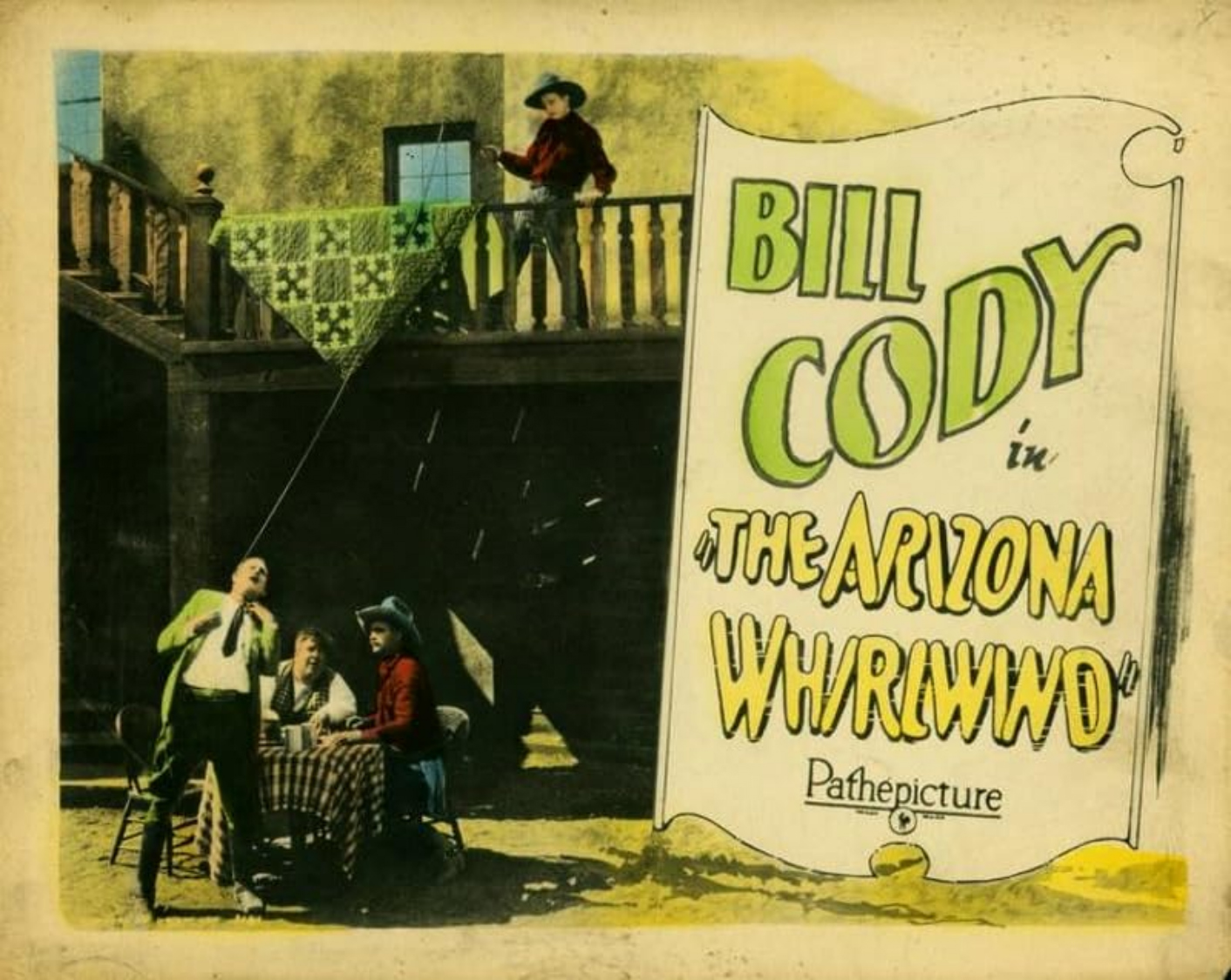
- Directed by: William James Craft
- Written by: Carl Krusada
- Produced by: Myron Selznick
- Starring: Bill Cody; Margaret Hampton; David Dunbar
- Cinematography: Arthur Reeves
- Production company: Myron Selznick Productions
- Distributed by: Pathé Exchange
- Release date: March 27, 1927
- Country: United States
- Languages: Silent; English intertitles

The Arizona Whirlwind is a 1927 American silent Western film directed by William James Craft and starring Bill Cody, Margaret Hampton and David Dunbar.

== Cast ==
- Bill Cody as Bill Farley
- Margaret Hampton as Helen Dykeman
- David Dunbar as Bert Hawley
- Hughie Mack as Gonzales
- Clark Comstock
