= Women and Gold =

1925 film

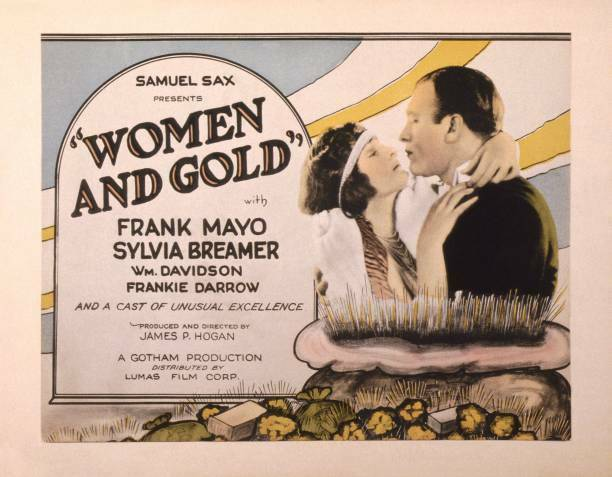
- Directed by: James P. Hogan
- Written by: Betty Grace Hartford; James P. Hogan
- Produced by: Samuel Sax
- Starring: Frank Mayo; Sylvia Breamer; William B. Davidson
- Cinematography: William H. Daniels
- Production company: Gotham Pictures
- Distributed by: Lumas Film Corporation
- Release date: January 18, 1925
- Running time: 60 minutes
- Country: United States
- Languages: Silent; English intertitles

Women and Gold is a 1925 American silent drama film directed by James P. Hogan and starring Frank Mayo, Sylvia Breamer and William B. Davidson. It was produced by the independent Gotham Pictures.

== Plot ==
In South America, bored Myra Barclay runs off with Señor Ortego the owner of the mine for which her husband is manager. Soon realizing she has made a mistake she decides to return to her husband but suffers a head injury and suffers amnesia. Meanwhile, her husband is arrested for the attempted murder of Ortego. Breaking free he manages to find his wife, and the sight of him restores her memory. Ortego has been dealt justice by being stabbed to death by another man he has wronged.

== Cast ==
- Frank Mayo as Dan Barclay
- Sylvia Breamer as Myra Barclay
- William B. Davidson as Señor Ortego
- Frankie Darro as Dan Barclay Jr.
- Ina Anson as Carmelita
- Tote Du Crow as Ricardo
- James Olivio as Humpy
- John T. Prince as Doc Silver

== Bibliography ==
- Connelly, Robert B. The Silents: Silent Feature Films, 1910-36, Volume 40, Issue 2. December Press, 1998.
- Munden, Kenneth White. The American Film Institute Catalog of Motion Pictures Produced in the United States, Part 1. University of California Press, 1997.
