= Paul Eagler =

American special effects artist

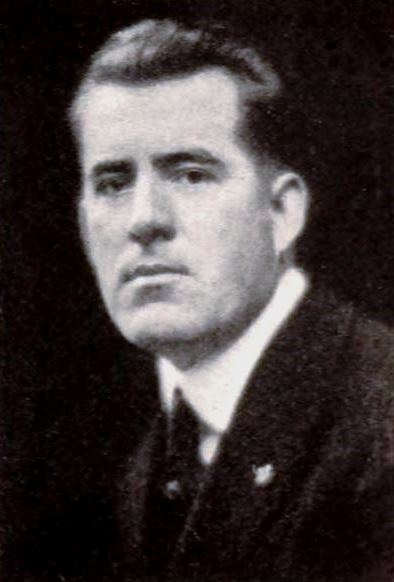
- From a 1920 magazine
- Born: September 24, 1890; Newman, Illinois, United States
- Died: September 29, 1961 (aged 71); Sherman Oaks, California, United States
- Occupation: Special effects artist
- Years active: 1922-1960

Paul E. Eagler (September 24, 1890 – September 29, 1961) was an American special effects artist. He won an Academy Award for Best Special Effects, for Portrait of Jennie, and was nominated for another one in the same category for Foreign Correspondent.

== Biography ==
Paul E. Eagler was born in Newman, Illinois on September 24, 1890.

He died in Sherman Oaks, California on September 29, 1961.

== Selected filmography ==
- Because of a Woman (1917)
- Sudden Jim (1917)
- The Millionaire Vagrant (1917)
- Bond of Fear (1917)
- Partners of the Tide (1921)
- Five Bad Men (1935)

Eagler won one Academy Award for Best Special Effects and was nominated for another one:

=== Won ===
- Portrait of Jennie (1948)

=== Nominated ===
- Foreign Correspondent (1940)
