= Get Your Man =

Get Your Man may refer to:

- Get Your Man (1921 film), a 1921 American silent film
- Get Your Man (1927 film), a 1927 American silent film
- Get Your Man (1934 film), a 1934 British comedy film
