= The Figurehead =

The Figurehead may refer to:

- "The Figurehead", song by the Cure from the album Pornography, 1982
- The Figurehead (film), 1920 American silent drama film
