= Tearing Through =

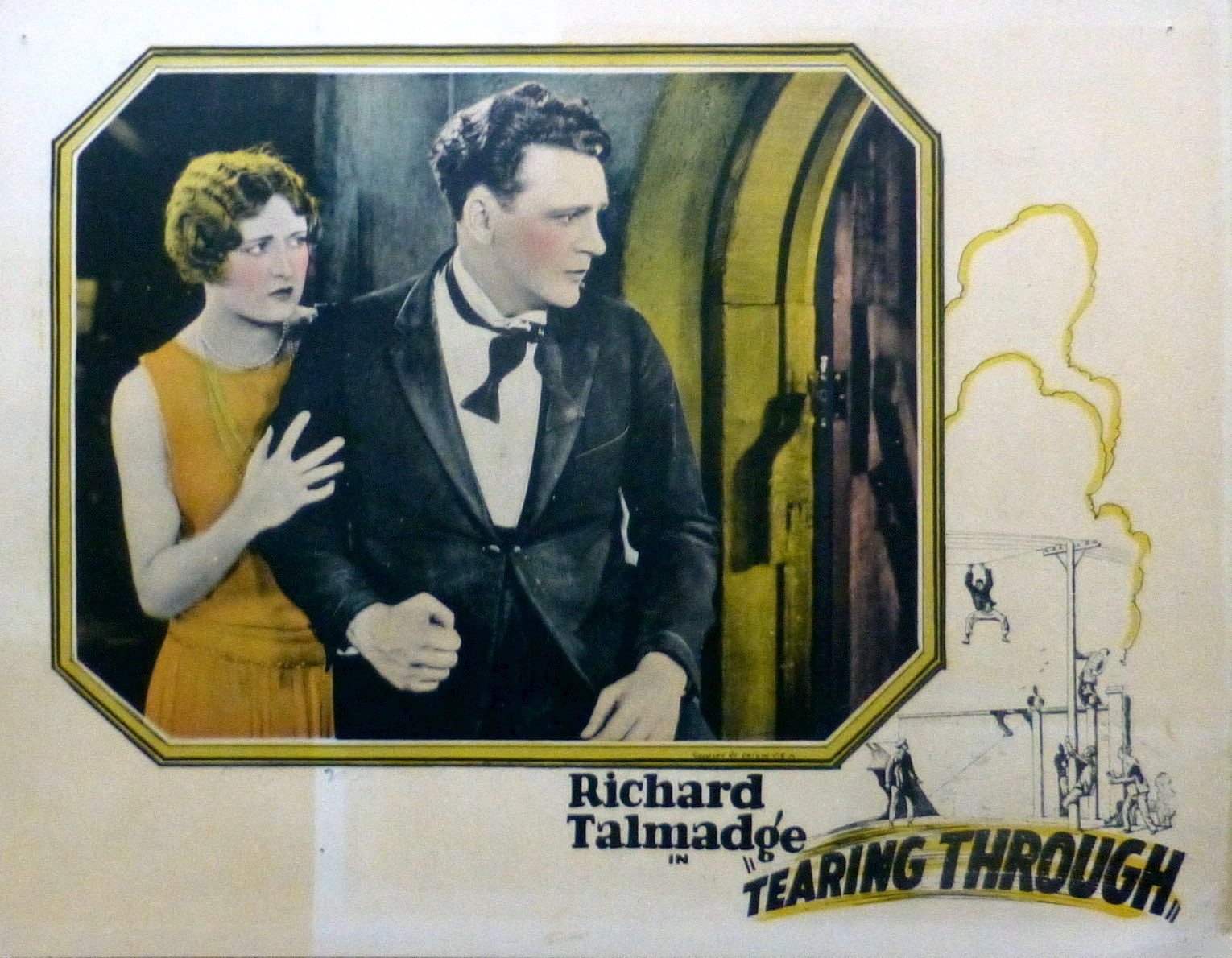
- Lobby card with McGuire and Talmadge
- Directed by: Arthur Rosson
- Written by: Frederick Stowers
- Starring: Richard Talmadge; Kathryn McGuire; Herbert Prior
- Cinematography: William Marshall
- Production companies: Richard Talmadge Productions; Truart Film Corporation
- Distributed by: Film Booking Offices of America
- Release date: April 12, 1925
- Running time: 50 minutes
- Country: United States
- Language: Silent (English intertitles)

Tearing Through is a 1925 American silent action film directed by Arthur Rosson and starring Richard Talmadge, Kathryn McGuire, and Herbert Prior. It was released in Britain in 1926 by Ideal Films. The film originally had the title "Yellow Faces".

== Plot ==
As described in a film magazine review, Richard Jones, assistant to the district attorney, volunteers to round up a ring of drug peddlers. He finds his rival for the hand of Constance Madison is in charge of the hop joint. He rescues Constance from the clutches of his rival and brings the peddlers in. He then learns that the District Attorney is involved in the hop ring. He becomes the new district attorney and also Constance's husband.

== Cast ==
- Richard Talmadge as Richard Jones
- Kathryn McGuire as Constance Madison
- Herbert Prior as District Attorney
- Frank Elliott as Mr. Greer
- Arthur Rankin as Bob Madison
- Marcella Daly as Polly
- Dave Morris as Chester

== Bibliography ==
- Robert B. Connelly. The Silents: Silent Feature Films, 1910-36, Volume 40, Issue 2. December Press, 1998.
