= Helen Howard =

American actress

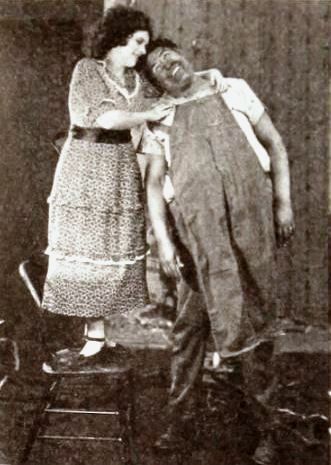
- Howard (left) in 1920
- Born: May 2, 1903; Colorado Springs, Colorado, US
- Died: March 14, 1927 (aged 23); Los Angeles, California, US
- Occupation: Actress

Helen Howard was an American actress who appeared in a string of B-movie westerns in the late 1910s and the 1920s.

== Selected filmography ==
- The First Auto (1927)
- Quick Change (1925)
- Captain Blood (1924)
- Deserted at the Altar (1922)
- My Wild Irish Rose (1922)
- When Romance Rides (1922)
- The Child Thou Gavest Me (1921)
- The Little Fool (1921)
- Blind Youth (1920)
- Brass Buttons (1919)
- The Ghost of Rosy Taylor (1918)
- The Primitive Woman (1918)
- The Midnight Trail (1918)
- The Sea Master (1917)
