= Beatrice Burnham =

American actress (1902–1995)

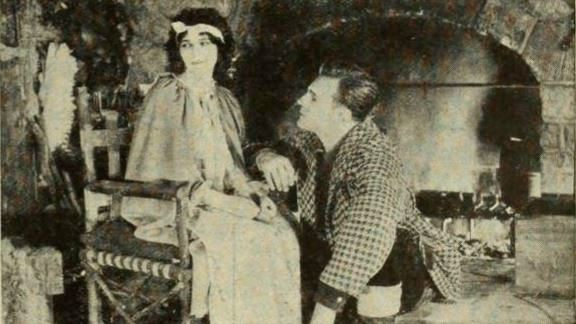
- Burnham (left) and Buck Jones in Trooper O'Neill (1922)
- Born: October 2, 1902; Galveston, Texas, U.S.
- Died: January 8, 1995 (aged 92); The Bronx, New York, U.S.
- Occupation: Actress
- Years active: 1916–1925

Beatrice Burnham (October 2, 1902 – January 8, 1995) was an American film actress in silent films.

== Selected filmography ==
- Ramona (1916)
- Jack and Jill (1917)
- The Petal on the Current (1919)
- Upstairs (1919)
- Hitchin' Posts (1920)
- Bullet Proof (1920)
- Burnt Wings (1920)
- The Home Stretch (1921)
- Three Sevens (1921)
- Diamonds Adrift (1921)
- Get Your Man (1921)
- Trooper O'Neill (1922)
- Tracks (1922)
- A Million to Burn (1923)
- The Flame of Life (1923)
- Kindled Courage (1923)
- Western Luck (1924)
- Siege (1925)
- Riders of the Purple Sage (1925)
