= Melbourne MacDowell =

American actor

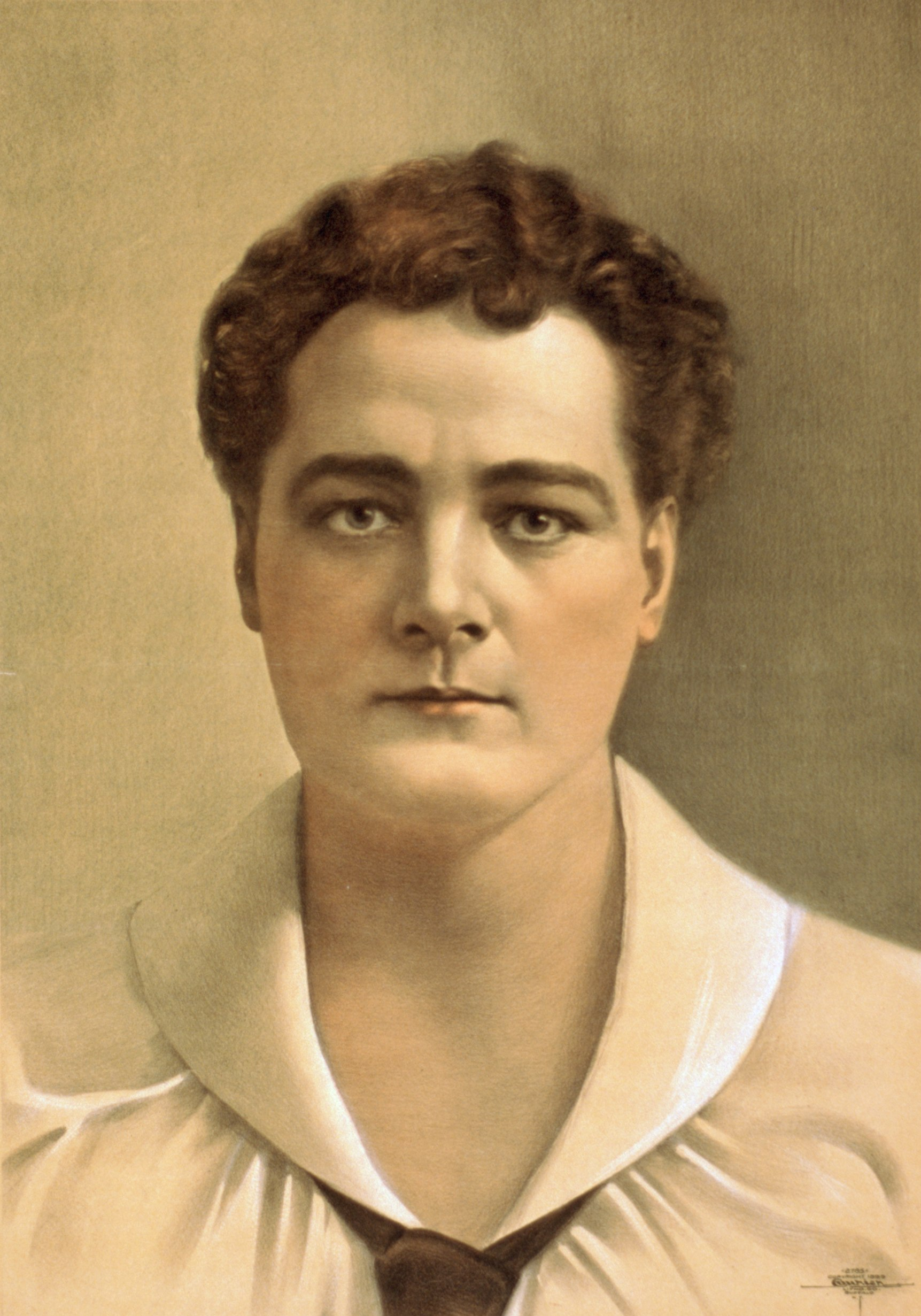
- Born: Willet Melbourne MacDowell; November 22, 1856; Little Washington, New Jersey, U.S.
- Died: February 18, 1941 (aged 84); Decoto, California, U.S.
- Occupation: Actor
- Years active: 1877–1932
- Spouses: Fanny Davenport (m.1889–1898, her death); Wilhelmina Marie Strauss; Nellie Irving; Virginia Drew Trescott; Mrs. Caroline Wells Neff
- Relatives: Claire McDowell (niece)

Willet Melbourne MacDowell (November 22, 1856 – February 18, 1941) was an American stage and screen actor. He was the second husband of famed stage actress Fanny Davenport. He began on the legitimate stage in the 1870s and first appeared on the silent screen in 1917.

== Biography ==
Willet Melbourne MacDowell was born in Little Washington, New Jersey (now South River, New Jersey). He had an older brother named E. A. MacDowell, who was the father of future actress Claire McDowell. As a teen Melbourne went to sea in the Merchant Marines, eventually becoming a mate.

== Theatre Productions ==
Back in the United States, he had his first acting experience in Montreal at a theatre where he was a ticket seller, assistant doorkeeper and where his brother was employed as an actor. MacDowell was occasionally asked upon to act. In Montreal he got a chance to act with Adelaide Neilson, a legend in her short life, in the Shakespeare play As You Like It. Neilson played one of the main characters Rosalind, and MacDowell was briefly on as Charles the wrestler.

By 1877 MacDowell made his first professional acting appearance in the United States at the Boston Museum, where his brother E.A. was an actor. In 1888 MacDowell became acquainted with Fanny Davenport playing in La Tosca with her. In 1889 the two married. He continued to act with her in a series of emotional plays until her death in 1898.

After Davenport died MacDowell became associated professionally with her successor, Blanche Walsh, who continued playing Davenport's famous and emotional roles. The duo famously performed all three of Victorien Sardou's plays at the Academy of Music, Montreal in 1899, which received universal critical acclaim. A large man weighing over 200 pounds, MacDowell often played the hero or a distinct character in plays.

== Films ==
MacDowell began appearing in silent feature films in 1917, by which time he was long a stage veteran. His costars were such actors as William S. Hart, Lon Chaney, Charles Ray, Enid Bennett and numerous others. Though he lived until the early 1940s, his film career ended in 1928 with the end of silent films. He returned for one sound film short in 1932, A Fool About Women with Andy Clyde and Vernon Dent.

Several films that Melbourne MacDowell appeared in survive today and can be found on DVD, particularly two of his outings with Lon Chaney, Nomads of the North and Outside the Law as well as the restored Bebe Daniels 1928 feature Feel My Pulse.

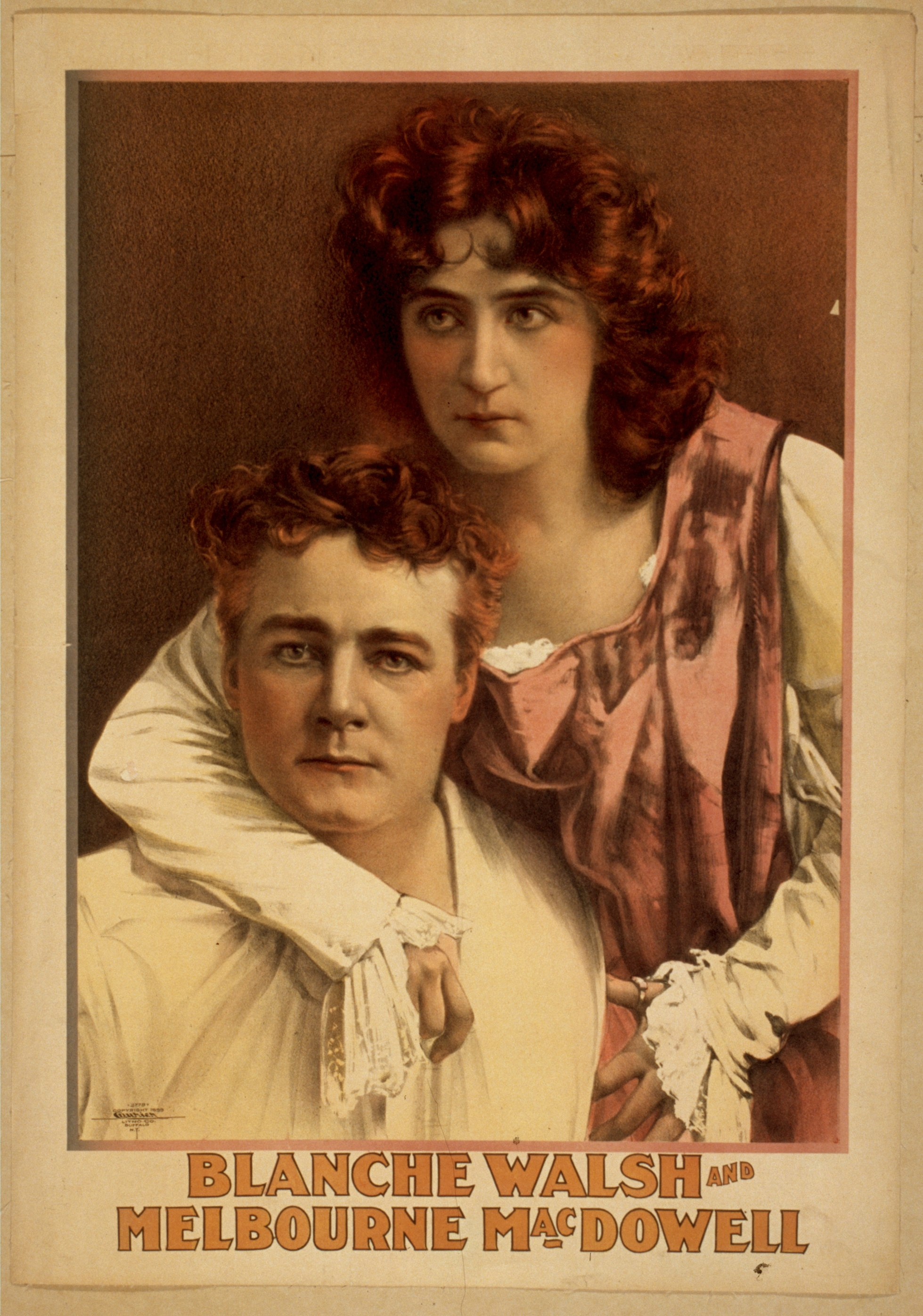
Theatre poster featuring Blanche Walsh and MacDowell, 1899, most likely in the play Gismonda

== Marriages, death ==
MacDowell was married several times, his most famous marriage was to the legendary Fanny Davenport. On February 18, 1941, MacDowell died at Decoto, California, from a clot on his brain.

== Selected filmography ==
- Corbett and Courtney Before the Kinetograph (1894)
- The Flame of the Yukon (1917)
- Bond of Fear (1917)
- Wolves of the Rail (1918)
- The Keys of the Righteous (1918)\
- Go West, Young Man (1918)
- Eve in Exile (1919)
- All of a Sudden Norma (1919)
- The Boomerang (1919)
- The Iron Heart (1920)
- The Gift Supreme (1920)
- Nomads of the North (1920)
- Outside the Law (1920)
- The March Hare (1921)
- The Golden Snare (1921)
- Diamonds Adrift (1921)
- Beyond the Crossroads (1922)
- Confidence (1922)
- The Bootlegger's Daughter (1922)
- The Ghost Patrol (1923)
- The Love Pirate (1923)
- Richard the Lion-Hearted (1923)
- Geared to Go (1924)
- Virtue's Revolt (1924)
- The Cloud Rider (1925)
- Savages of the Sea (1925)
- The Patent Leather Pug (1925)
- Speed Mad (1925)
- The Rainmaker (1926)
- Behind the Front (1926)
- Stick to Your Story (1926)
- The Outlaw Express (1926)
- The Winning Wallop (1926)
- The City (1926)
- What Happened to Jones (1926)
- Driven from Home (1927)
- Black Tears (1927)
- There It Is (1928)(*short)
- Feel My Pulse (1928)
- The Old Code (1928)
