= Smudge (film) =

1922 film by Charles Ray

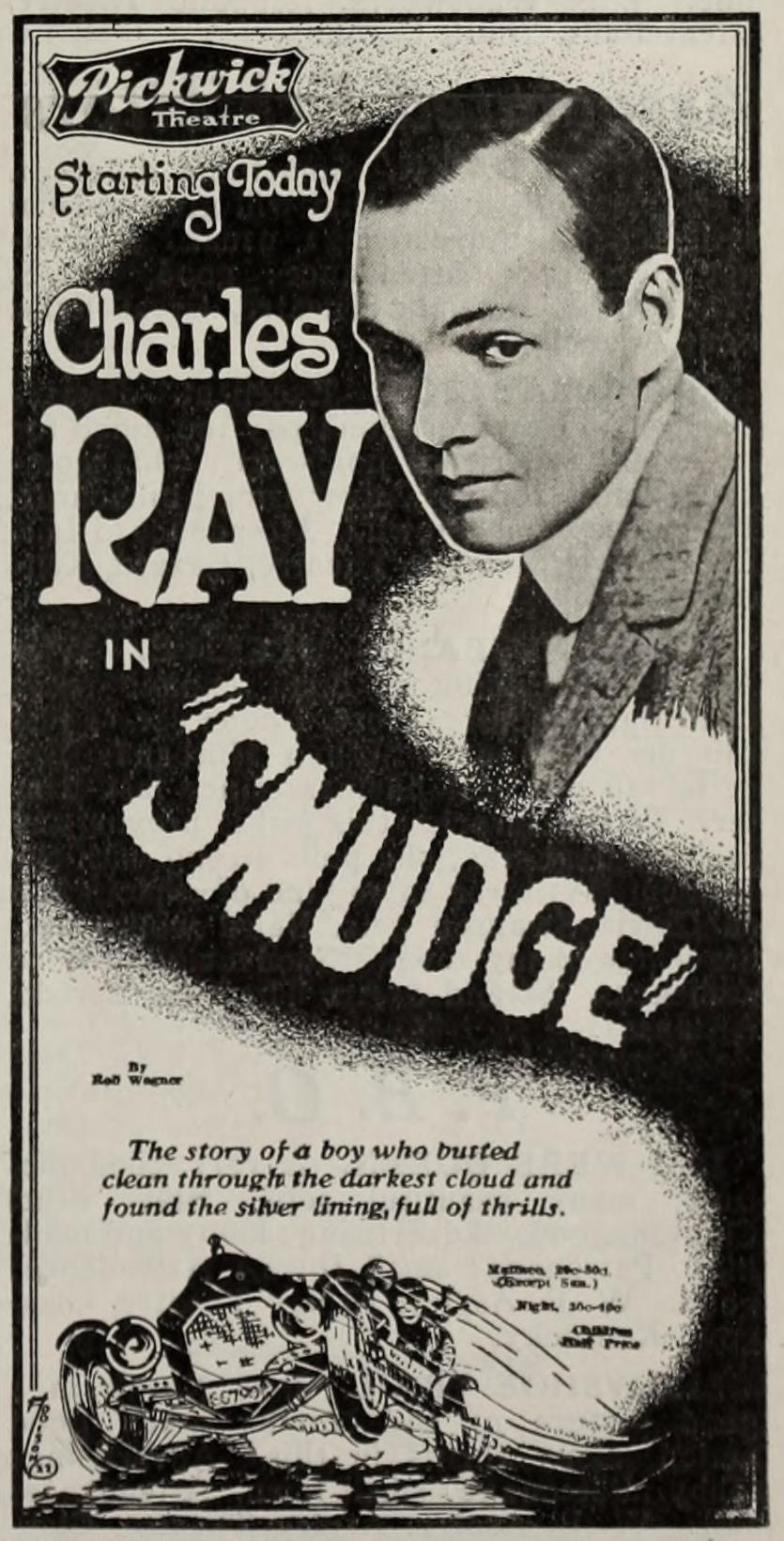
- Advertisement
- Directed by: Charles Ray; Assistant Directors: Albert Ray; Charles Van Deroef
- Written by: Intertitles: Edward Withers; Story, Scenario: Rob Wagner
- Produced by: Charles Ray; Arthur S. Kane
- Starring: Charles Ray; Ora Carew
- Cinematography: George Rizard; Ellsworth H. Rumer
- Edited by: Harry L. Decker
- Distributed by: First National Pictures
- Release date: July 1922
- Running time: 5 reels
- Country: United States
- Language: Silent (English intertitles)

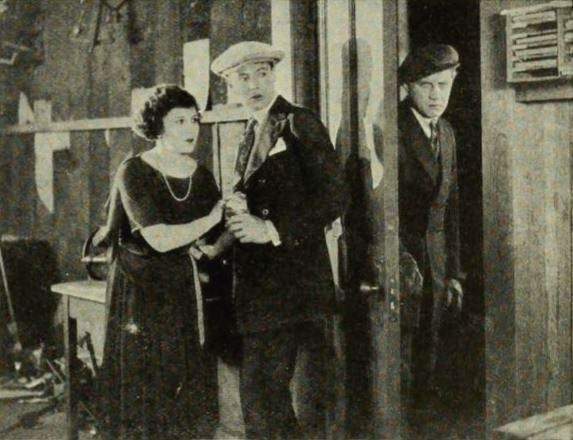
Scene with Ora Carew, Charles Ray, and Charles K. French

Smudge is a 1922 American silent comedy-drama film produced and directed by Charles Ray. It starred Ray and Ora Carew.

== Cast ==
- Charles Ray as Stephen Stanton
- Charles K. French as John Stanton
- Florence Oberle as Mrs. Clement
- Ora Carew as Marie Clement
- J. P. Lockney as Purdy
- Blanche Rose as Mrs. Purdy
- Lloyd Bacon as McGuire
- Ralph McCullough as Regan

== Preservation ==
Smudge is preserved at the Library of Congress and the Wisconsin Center for Film and Theater Research.
