= Sherlock Brown =

1922 film directed by Bayard Veiller

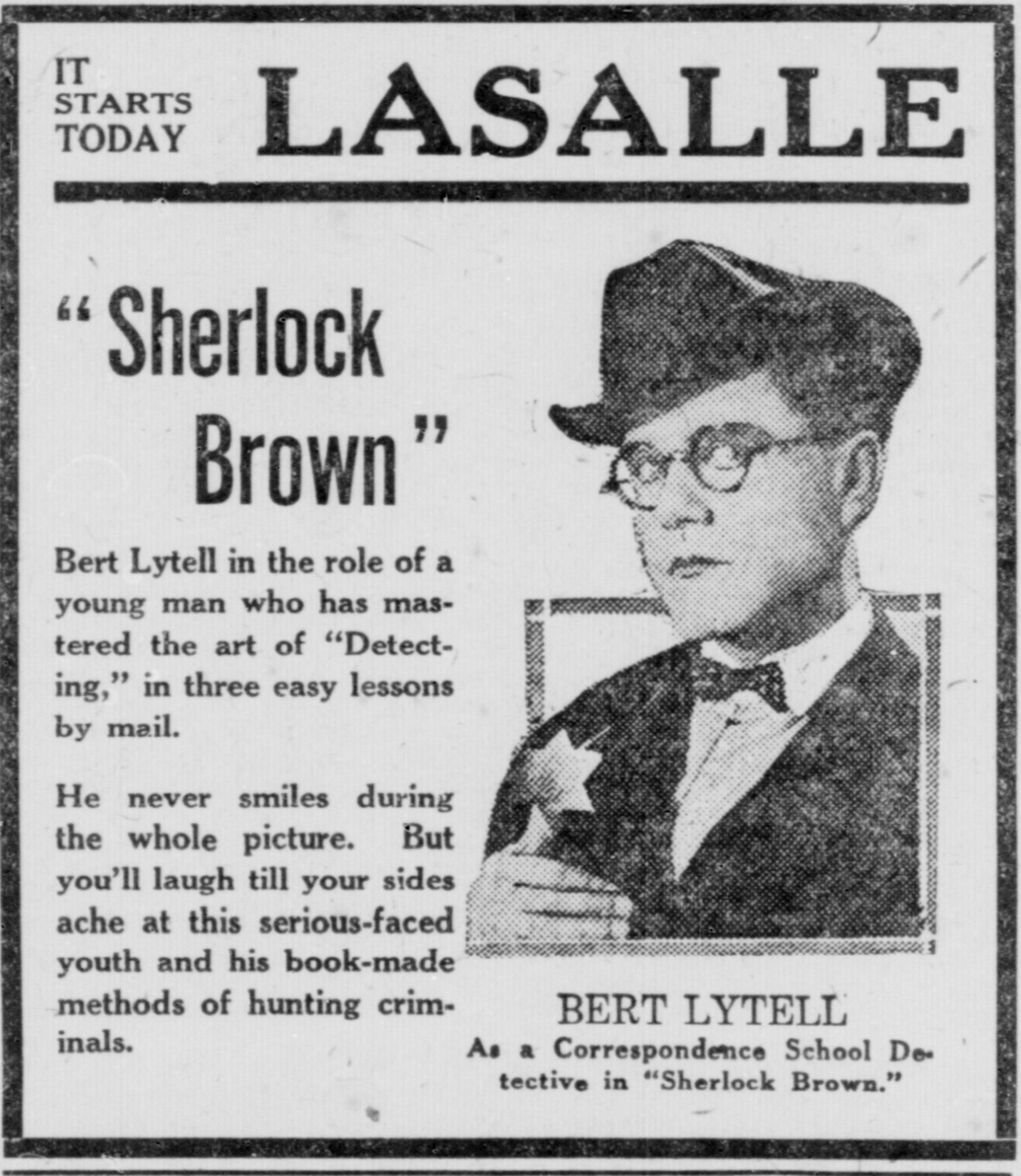
- Newspaper advertisement
- Directed by: Bayard Veiller
- Written by: Lenore Coffee (scenario)
- Story by: Bayard Veiller
- Starring: Bert Lytell; Ora Carew; Sylvia Breamer
- Cinematography: Arthur Martinelli
- Production company: Metro Pictures
- Release date: June 26, 1922 (US)
- Running time: 5 reels
- Country: United States
- Language: English

Sherlock Brown is a 1922 American silent comedy-drama film. Directed by Bayard Veiller, the film stars Bert Lytell, Ora Carew, and Sylvia Breamer. It was released on June 26, 1922. No prints of the film are known to survive, so it is currently classified as lost.

== Cast ==
- Bert Lytell as William Brown
- Ora Carew as Barbara Musgrave
- Sylvia Breamer as Hilda
- De Witt Jennings as J. J. Wallace
- Theodore Von Eltz as Frank Morton
- Wilton Taylor as Chief Bard
- Hardee Kirkland as General Bostwick
- George Barnum as Henry Stark
- George Kuwa as Sato
