= Blanche Walsh =

American actress (1873–1915)

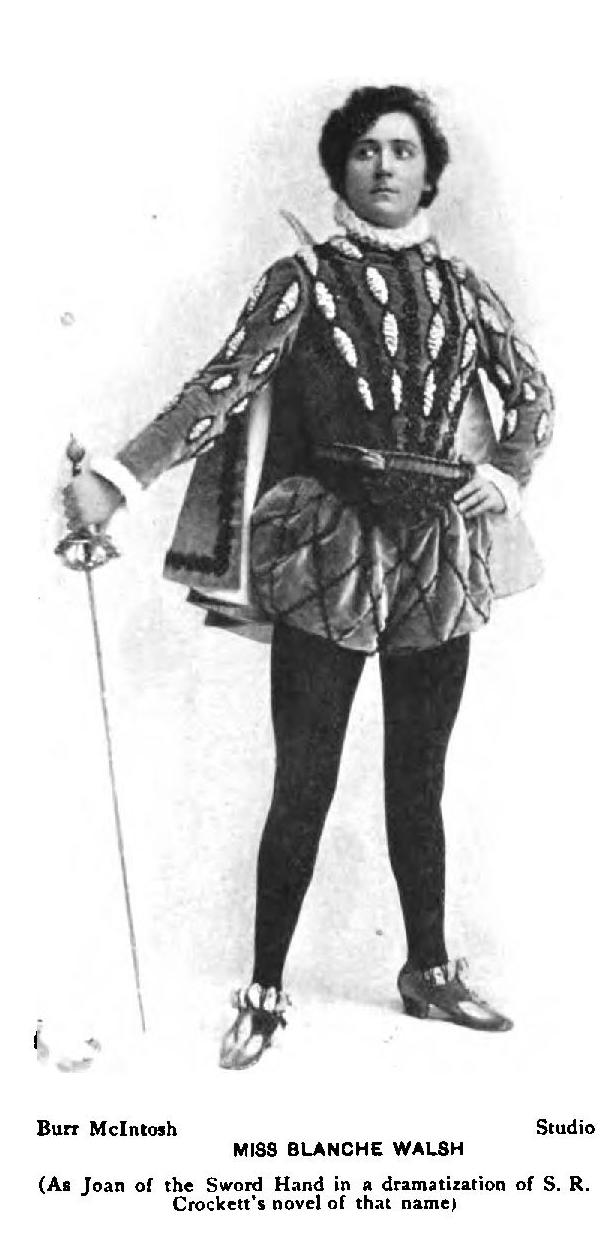
- Blanche Walsh (1901)
- Born: January 4, 1873; New York City, U.S.
- Died: October 31, 1915 (aged 42); Cleveland, Ohio, U.S.
- Occupation: Actress
- Years active: 1888–1915
- Spouses: Alfred Hickman (m. 1896; div. 1903) William Travers (m. 1906)

Blanche Walsh (January 4, 1873 – October 31, 1915) was a highly regarded American stage actress who appeared in one film, Resurrection based on the novel by Leo Tolstoy and the first three reel treatment of any Tolstoy story.

== Biography ==
Walsh's father was Thomas Power "Fatty" Walsh, a Tammany politician and a prison warden. She made her stage debut at 15 in 1888 and acted in Charles Frohman's stock company. Walsh trouped for years in support of bigger names like Marie Wainwright, William Gillette and Nat C. Goodwin. In 1896 she accompanied Goodwin on a tour of Australia in Trilby.

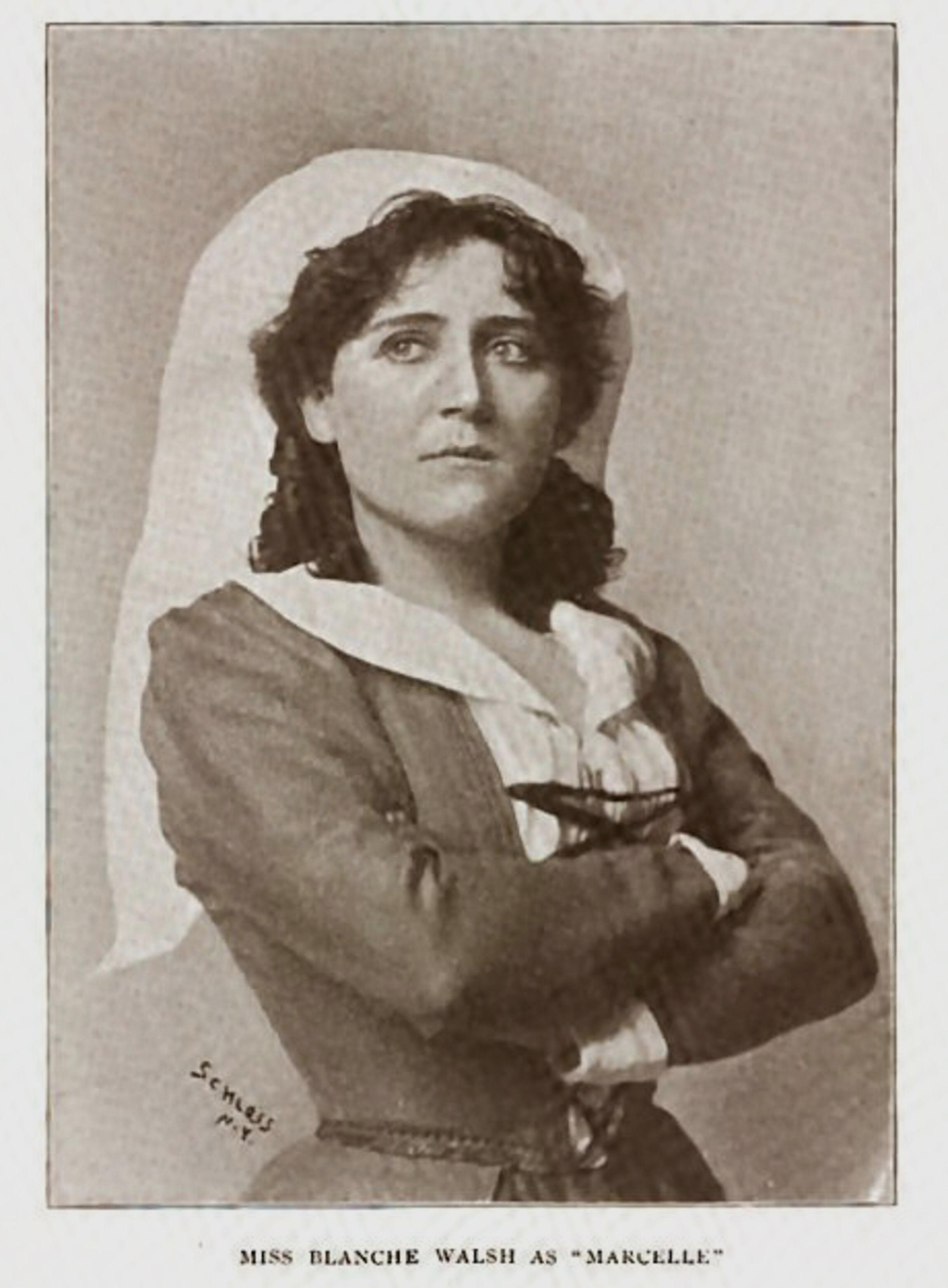
Walsh as Marcelle The International, Volume 9; 1900

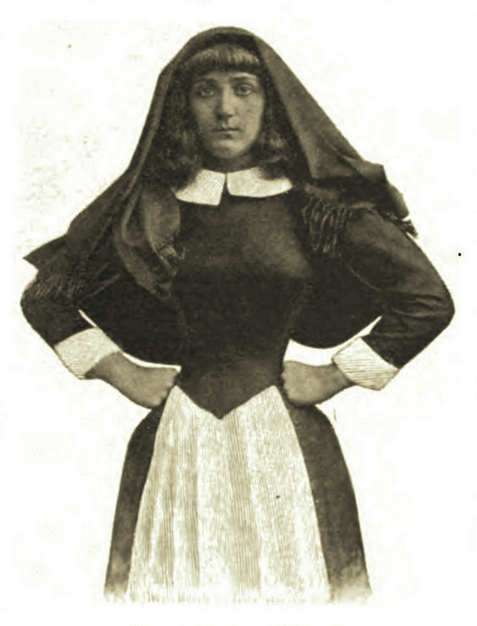
Blanche Walsh as "Trilby"

Walsh began picking up the emotional roles that Fanny Davenport had been playing, as Davenport was ill for a time prior to her 1898 death. Walsh was much younger than Davenport but bore a strong resemblance to her. After several years apprenticing in the emotional roles, Walsh moved up to more challenging parts such as Maslova the prostitute in Tolstoy's Resurrection and Margaret Rolfe in The Woman in the Case.

In 1899 Walsh performed at the prestigious Academy of Music, Montreal, on her tour of Canada with American stage actor Melbourne McDowell, presenting Victorien Sardou's plays La Tosca, Gismonda, and Fédora. Walsh received critical acclaim for her performances, with critics pronouncing her a "genius" and "talent of the highest kind." The costumes were equally famous, with Walsh wearing a head-girdle with $50,000 of diamonds, rubies, sapphires, and emeralds set into an exquisite network of gold.

The theatre-going public of Montreal, or at least as many as could pack themselves into the Academy of Music on Saturday night, fell down and worshipped at the shrine of Blanche Walsh. Seldom, indeed, has a reception at once so spontaneous and enthusiastic fallen fallen to the lot of any actress in Montreal.

In 1901, Walsh did a four-week engagement at the Elitch Theatre in Denver, Colorado. She opened in Under Two Flags the dramatization of Ouida's novel by Denverite, Edward Elsner. The biographer of Mary Elitch Long, the owner of Elitch Theatre, wrote that "when Blanche Walsh is truly interested in a part there is no woman on the stage who plays with more fire and intense realism." For her third week at the theater, Walsh performed in Romeo and Juliet, "she the Romeo and Maude Fealy the Juliet."

Walsh's time at Elitch Theatre was a great success, but Mary Elitch reported that "the management was accused of unheard of liberality when it became public that Miss Walsh was receiving a weekly salary of $750."

She starred in a production of Tolstoy's The Kreutzer Sonata in 1904. An early silent short film from 1905 by Thomas Edison shows a theatre marquee announcing a Blanche Walsh appearance in a play. Walsh's name is in big bold letters but she doesn't appear anywhere in the film. In 1912 Walsh agreed to do one motion picture for an independent film company, a film adaptation of the Tolstoy play she had been acting in on the stage, Resurrection. The film would be distributed through Adolph Zukor's new Famous Players company. This came around the same time that Zukor was showing Queen Elizabeth, a feature-length French film, starring Sarah Bernhardt. Zukor's aim was to lure big name Broadway stars to make feature films, films that are over 50 minutes. Walsh was one of the first major stage stars to make a film over 30 minutes long. Today Resurrection is a lost film.

== Personal life ==
Walsh was married to Alfred Hickman from 1896 to 1903. Walsh remarried to William Travers in 1906, with whom she remained married to until her death. She had no children.

James J. Walsh, a New York City attorney and member of Congress, was Walsh's first cousin; her father Thomas was the brother of James Walsh's father William.

== Death ==
Walsh, like Fanny Davenport, seemed to be plagued by health problems. Contemporary newspaper accounts registered her occasional hospitalizations.

Walsh died on October 31, 1915, after a final bout with her kidney problems. Her sudden death was a shock to theater goers and journalists alike.
