= Too Many Millions (1918 film) =

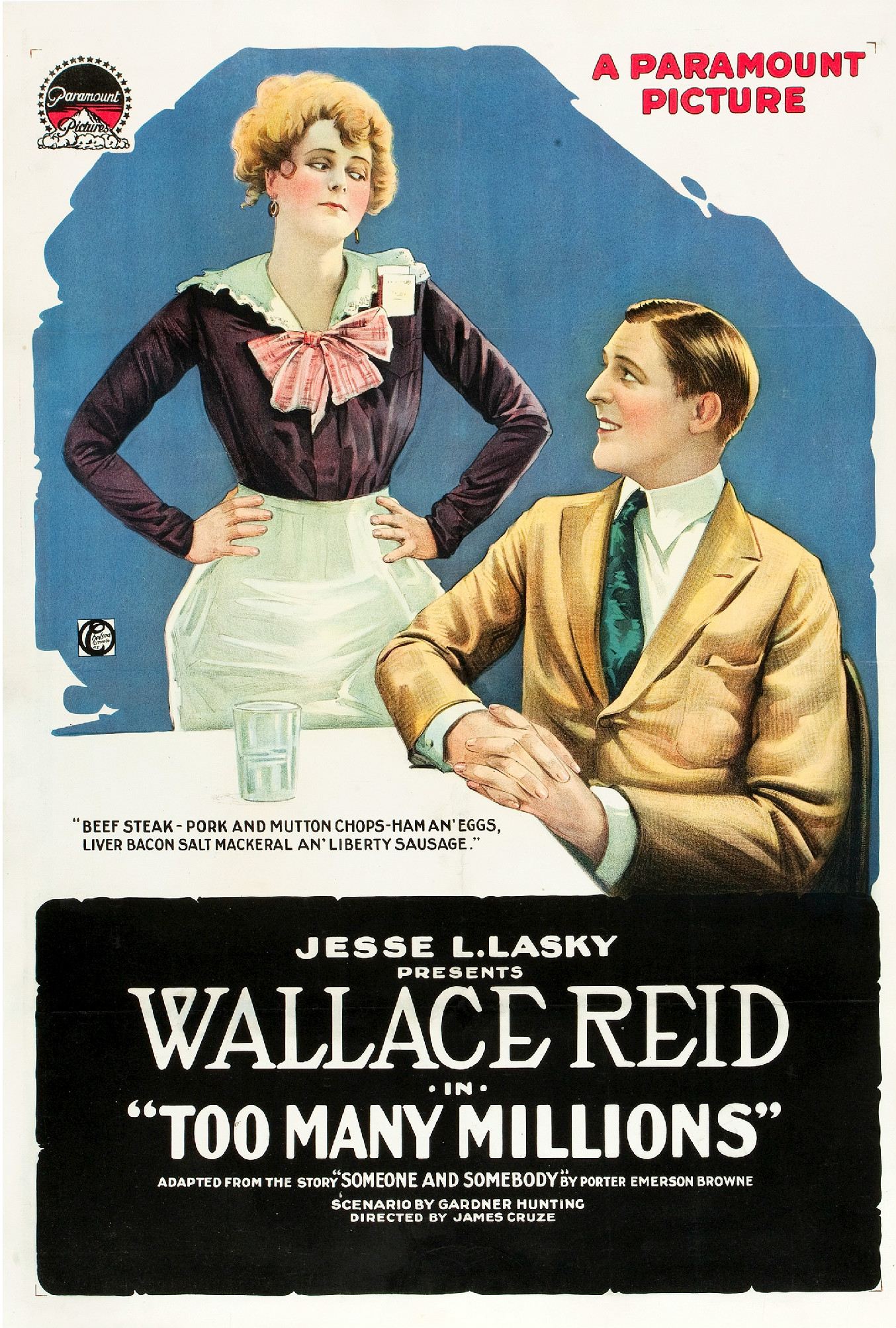
- Theatrical release poster
- Directed by: James Cruze
- Screenplay by: Gardner Hunting
- Based on: Someone and Somebody by Porter Emerson Browne
- Produced by: Jesse L. Lasky
- Starring: Wallace Reid; Ora Carew; Tully Marshall; Charles Ogle; James Neill; Winifred Greenwood
- Cinematography: Charles Rosher
- Production company: Jesse L. Lasky Feature Play Company
- Distributed by: Paramount Pictures
- Release date: December 8, 1918
- Running time: 50 minutes
- Country: United States
- Language: Silent (English intertitles)

Too Many Millions is a 1918 American silent comedy film directed by James Cruze and written by Gardner Hunting based upon the novel by Porter Emerson Browne. The film stars Wallace Reid, Ora Carew, Tully Marshall, Charles Ogle, James Neill, and Winifred Greenwood. The film was released on December 8, 1918, by Paramount Pictures.

== Plot ==
As described in a film magazine, the Bass brothers are unscrupulous misers while Artemus Wilkins is their confidential bookkeeper. The brothers are afraid that young Walsingham Van Doren, their nephew, will squander their ill-gotten gains, and on the day they propose to execute a will that will cut him off without a cent, they are both killed in an accident. Van Doren, who previously sold books door-to-door for a living, proceeds to have a good time with the $40 million left by his uncles. At an expensive New York hotel he takes a suite of rooms where he wines and dines to his heart's content, the only annoyance being that he has to sign for the foreclosure of mortgages that the faithful Wilkins brings. Finally, Van Doren gives Wilkins a power of attorney to sign everything and the next thing he knows is that Wilkins has turned everything into cash and skipped town. He learns of his plight as Desiree Lane, whose home he has acquired as a result of foreclosing a mortgage, is demanding the return of securities belonging to her father. The two start in search of Wilkins. They are driven from a New England cottage one night by a fire and then decide to get married. They settle in the little town and are happy when Wilkins bursts in on them to return the stolen money. The film ends with an intertitle asking "Mr. Audience, what would you do?"

== Cast ==
- Wallace Reid as Walsingham Van Doren
- Ora Carew as Desiree Lane
- Tully Marshall as Artemus Wilkins
- Charles Ogle as Garage Keeper
- James Neill as Mr. Lane
- Winifred Greenwood as Waitress
- Noah Beery, Sr. as R.A. Bass
- Percy G. Williams as B.A. Bass
- Ernest Pasque as Beverwyck
- Richard Wayne as Second Friend

== Preservation ==
In February of 2021, Too Many Millions was cited by the National Film Preservation Board on their Lost U.S. Silent Feature Films list and is therefore presumed lost.
