= My Wild Irish Rose (1922 film) =

1922 film

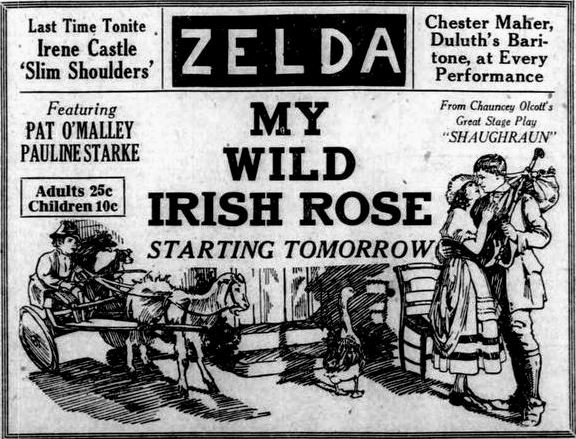
- Newspaper advertisement
- Directed by: David Smith
- Written by: C. Graham Baker; Harry Dittmar
- Based on: The Shaughraun; 1874 play by Dion Boucicault
- Produced by: Albert E. Smith
- Cinematography: Stephen Smith Jr.
- Distributed by: Vitagraph Company of America
- Release date: August 30, 1922
- Running time: 7 reels
- Country: United States
- Language: Silent (English intertitles)

My Wild Irish Rose is a lost 1922 American silent drama film directed by David Smith and based on Dion Boucicault's 19th century play The Shaughraun. It was produced and released by the Vitagraph Company of America.

== Plot ==
Based on the play The Shaughraun, this is the story of Robert Ffolliat, a young Irish lad, who is done out of his land and sent off to a penal colony in Australia following false accusations by the greedy Kinchella. Conn the Shaughraun comes to his rescue, helps him to escape from the prison ship and return to Ireland where he is united with his sweetheart.

== Cast ==
- Pat O'Malley as Conn, The Shaughraun
- Helen Howard as Arte O'Neale
- Maude Emory as Claire Ffolliott (credited as Maud Emery)
- Pauline Starke as Moya
- Edward Cecil as Robert Folliott
- Henry Herbert as Capt. Molineaux (credited as Henry Hebert)
- Jim Farley as Corry Cinchella (credited as James Farley)
- Bobbie Mack as Harvey Duff (credited as Bobby Mack)
- Frank Clark as Father Dolan
- Richard Daniels as Barry
- Mickey Daniels as Moya's little brother (uncredited)
