= Bond of Fear (1917 film) =

1917 film

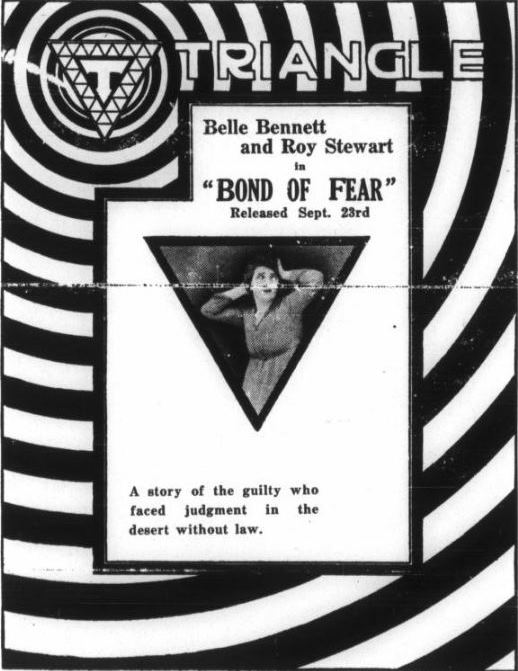
- Directed by: Jack Conway
- Written by: Edith M. Kennedy
- Starring: Roy Stewart; Belle Bennett; Melbourne MacDowell
- Cinematography: Paul Eagler
- Production company: Triangle Film Corporation
- Distributed by: Triangle Distributing
- Release date: September 23, 1917
- Running time: 5 reels
- Country: United States
- Languages: Silent; English intertitles

Bond of Fear is a 1917 American silent Western film directed by Jack Conway and starring Roy Stewart, Belle Bennett, and Melbourne MacDowell.

== Cast ==
- Roy Stewart as Cal Nelson
- Belle Bennett as Mary Jackson
- Melbourne MacDowell as Judge McClure
- George Webb as John McClure
- John Lince as Hotel Proprietor

== Bibliography ==
- James Robert Parish & Michael R. Pitts. Film directors: a guide to their American films. Scarecrow Press, 1974.
