= Resurrection (1912 film) =

- Directed by: Joseph A. Golden
- Based on: novel Resurrection by Leo Tolstoy
- Produced by: Adolph Zukor
- Starring: Blanche Walsh
- Production company: Masko Film Company
- Distributed by: Famous Players Film Company
- Release date: October 1912
- Running time: 46 minutes
- Country: United States
- Language: English

Resurrection is a lost 1912 silent drama short film based on the 1899 novel Resurrection (Voskraeseniye) by Count Leo Tolstoy. It was directed by Joseph A. Golden, produced by Adolph Zukor and released by Famous Players Film Company, It is the first original film Zukor ever produced in contrast to the famous Les Amours de la reine Élisabeth starring Sarah Bernhardt which was made in France and which he bought the U.S. distribution rights.

Resurrection starred Blanche Walsh, a famous American stage star of the day, who had played in Resurrection on Broadway. This would be Walsh's only film as she died three years later.

D. W. Griffith had filmed a version of the story in 1909. Filmed versions followed in 1918 with Pauline Frederick, 1927 with Dolores del Río and 1931 with Lupe Vélez.

== Cast ==
- Blanche Walsh - Katyusha
- Sydney Mason - Prince Nekhlyudov
- Nicholas Dunaew - Smelkov
- Carey Lee - Tavern Girl
