= Playing with Fire (1921 American film) =

1921 film

Playing With Fire
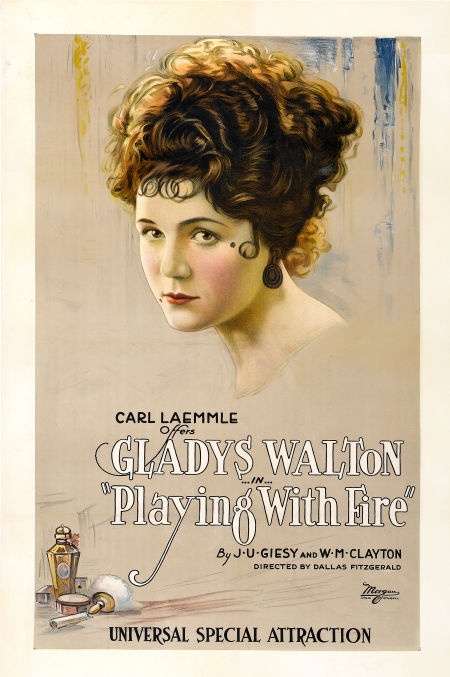
- Film poster
- Directed by: Dallas M. Fitzgerald
- Written by: William M. Clayton; J.U. Giesy; Doris Schroeder
- Produced by: Carl Laemmle
- Starring: Gladys Walton
- Cinematography: Milton Moore
- Production company: Universal Studios
- Distributed by: Universal Film Manufacturing Company
- Release date: December 19, 1921
- Running time: 50 minutes; 5 reels
- Country: United States
- Language: Silent (English intertitles)

Playing With Fire is a lost 1921 American silent comedy film directed by Dallas M. Fitzgerald and starring Gladys Walton.

== Plot ==
As described in a film magazine, Enid Gregory works in a music store. She is a regular "jazz baby" who flirts with others while keeping company with Bill Butler, a plumber. She finds Janet Fenwick, a young society woman whose father committed suicide under a cloud of disgrace, so Enid gets her employer Bruce Tilford to hire Janet to sing the ballads that she plays. Business picks up and Tilford gives the two women two days of vacation. Enid and Janet go to a fashionable hotel where they meet several of Janet's former friends. Janet becomes engaged to an old sweetheart and Enid succumbs to the embrace of Kent Lloyd, a wealthy young man, and allows him to slip a ring on her finger. In the last reel, they cope with the effects of a fire.

== Cast ==
- Gladys Walton as Enid Gregory
- Kathryn McGuire as Janet Fenwick
- Eddie Gribbon as Bill Butler
- Hayward Mack as Bruce Tilford
- Harold Miller as Jack Taylor
- Hallam Cooley as Kent Lloyd
- Sidney Franklin as Pat Isaacs
- Lydia Knott as Miss Seraphina
- Harriet Laurel as Maggie Turner
- Elinor Hancock as Mrs. Taylor
- Danny Hoy as Rats
