= Kathryn McGuire =

American actress and dancer (1903–1978)

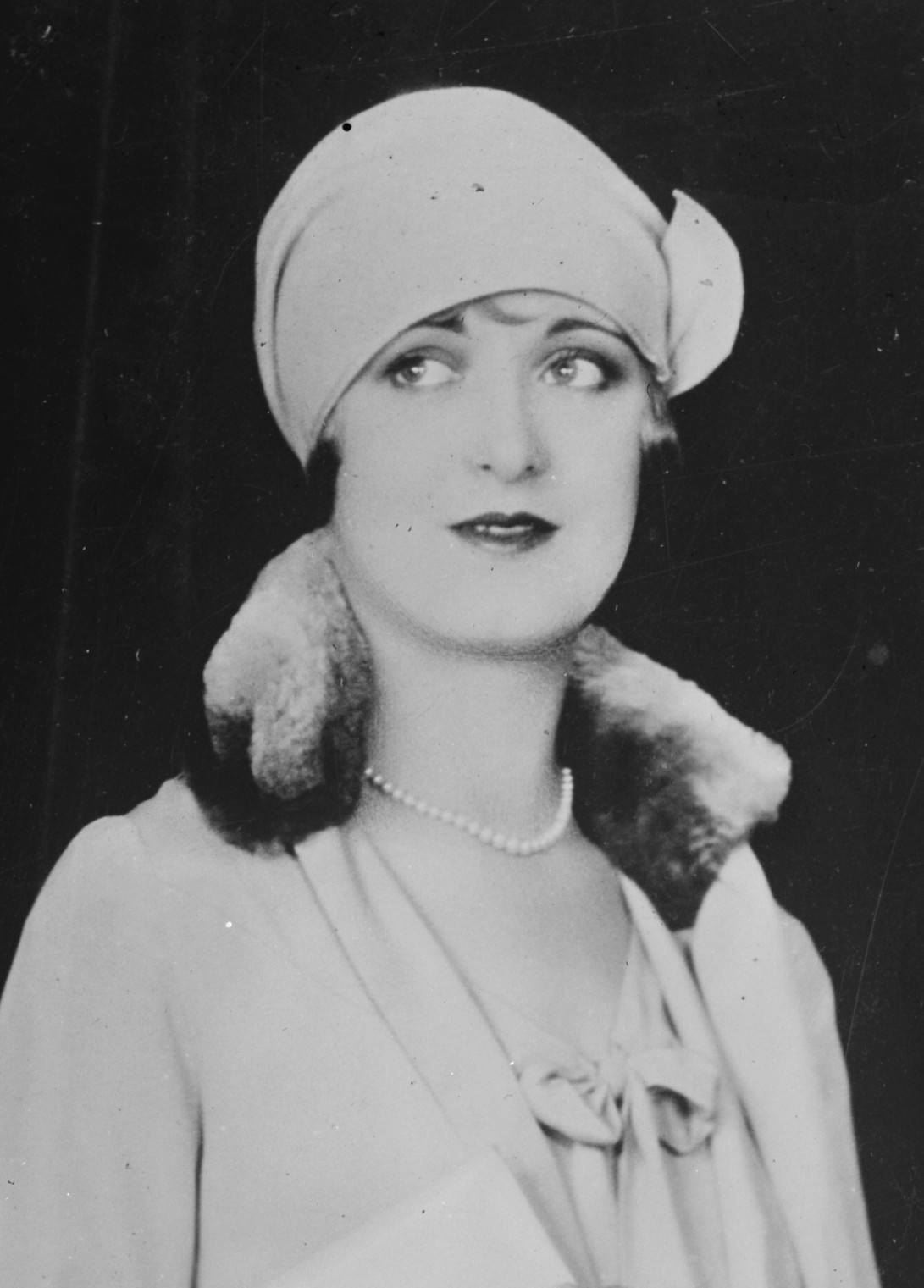
- Born: December 6, 1903; Peoria, Illinois, U.S.
- Died: October 10, 1978 (aged 74); Los Angeles, California, U.S.
- Occupations: Actress, dancer
- Years active: 1919–1930; 1958–1959
- Spouse: George Landy (m. 1927; died 1955)
- Children: 1

Kathryn McGuire (December 6, 1903 – October 10, 1978) was an American dancer and actress.

== Early life ==
Born in Peoria, Illinois, McGuire was said to be recognized by critics and fans alike as one of the rising stars in film. Selected one of the WAMPAS Baby Stars in 1922, she was the first person in her family to enter the acting profession.

At an early age, McGuire's family moved to Aurora, Illinois and then to Chicago. McGuire received her education from the Jennings Seminary in Aurora, and remained there even after her parents left that city. By the time she graduated at about the age of fourteen, her parents were ready to move to California.

McGuire was highly interested in dancing, and took classes under the leading ballet masters when she arrived in California. Even after her film career kicked off and she became deeply interested in this new employment, she continued to keep up her dancing.

== Career ==
While studying at the Hollywood High School, as well as her dancing, McGuire participated in a program exhibition at the Maryland Hotel in Pasadena, California.

She was seen by Thomas H. Ince, who immediately offered McGuire a solo number in an upcoming film. Her dancing skills led her not only to find jobs at Ince, but also at Universal and Mack Sennett. It was Sennett who realized that McGuire had genuine acting capabilities along the lines of her talent for dance after she performed a number in a comedy being produced by Sennett. This opportunity led to solo dances in other films, and then a period of extra and supporting work at Mack Sennett's studio. Her most famous work from this period is The Shriek of Araby, a spoof of The Sheik in which McGuire played Diana to Ben Turpin's cross-eyed Ahmed. She also was featured in Sennett's comedies.

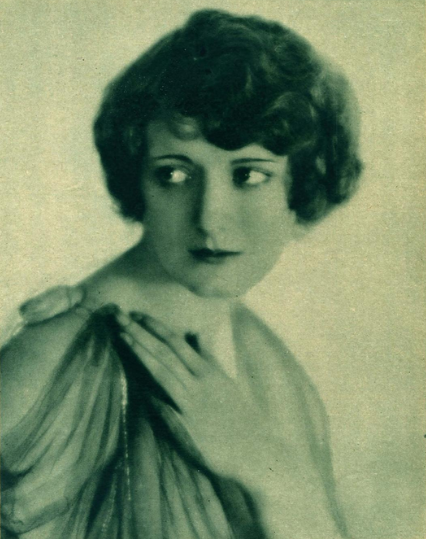
Kathryn McGuire (1923)

McGuire's first serious role came as the "only girl" in The Silent Call (1921). She also starred with Gladys Walton in Playing with Fire (1921) for Universal Pictures as well as in The Flame of Life (1923) with Priscilla Dean.

McGuire did not advance to leading-lady status in dramas, because of her height (about 5 feet tall). However, this circumstance made her an ideal foil for the era's comedy stars, themselves slight in stature. She is probably best remembered today for her ingenue roles opposite Buster Keaton in Sherlock Jr. and The Navigator (both 1924). By the late 1920s she was working steadily for Educational Pictures in two-reel comedies, opposite Charley Bowers or Lupino Lane. She left Educational in 1930, as did Lane.

== Personal life ==
On September 18, 1927, McGuire married George W. Landy, a studio publicity director, in Hollywood. Their marriage ended in 1955 upon his death. They had a daughter, born July 14, 1936. After her husband's death, McGuire returned briefly to acting, playing character roles on television.

== Death ==
McGuire died of cancer in 1978 at age 74 in Los Angeles. She was survived by her daughter and a sister.

== Partial filmography ==
- Salome vs. Shenandoah (1919)
- Down on the Farm (1920)
- Playing with Fire (1921)
- Molly O (1921)
- Home Talent (1921)
- Bucking the Line (1921)
- Love's Outcast (1921)
- The Silent Call (1921)
- The Crossroads of New York (1922)
- The Flame of Life (1923)
- The Love Pirate (1923)
- The Printer's Devil (1923)
- The Woman of Bronze (1923)
- The Shriek of Araby (1923)
- Phantom Justice (1924)
- Sherlock Jr. (1924) as The Girl
- Pioneer's Gold (1924)
- The Navigator (1924) as Betsy O'Brien
- Failure (1925)
- Giddap! (1925)
- Easy Going Gordon (1925)
- Two-Fisted Jones (1925)
- Tearing Through (1925)
- With Buffalo Bill on the U. P. Trail (1926)
- With Davy Crockett at the Fall of the Alamo (1926)
- Somebody's Mother (1926)
- The Thrill Hunter (1926)
- The Girl in the Pullman (1927)
- Lilac Time (1928)
- There It Is (1928)
- Synthetic Sin (1929)
- The Long Long Trail (1929)
- The Lost Zeppelin (1929)
- The Big Diamond Robbery (1929)
