= Go West, Young Man (1918 film) =

1918 film

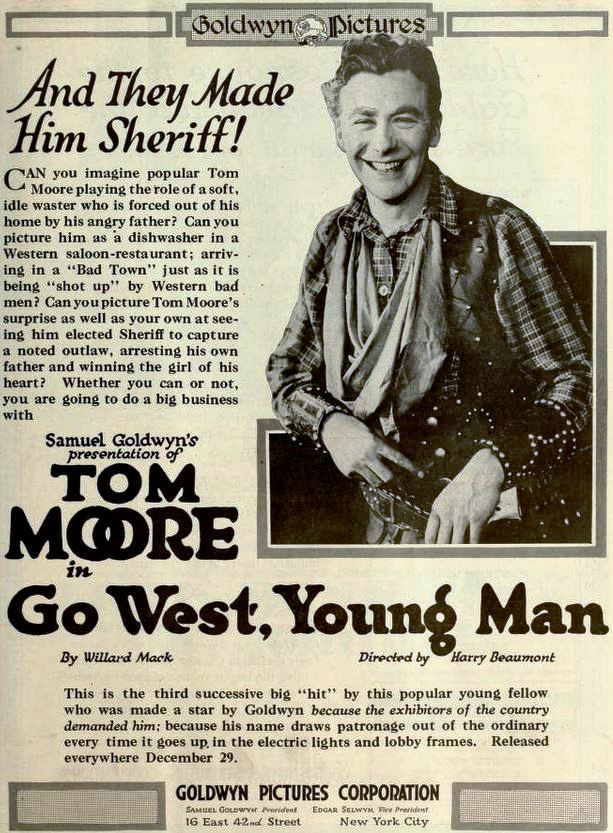
- Directed by: Harry Beaumont
- Written by: Willard Mack
- Produced by: Samuel Goldwyn
- Starring: Tom Moore; Ora Carew; Melbourne MacDowell
- Cinematography: George Webber
- Production company: Goldwyn Pictures
- Distributed by: Goldwyn Distributing
- Release date: February 2, 1918
- Running time: 50 minutes
- Country: United States
- Languages: Silent; English intertitles

Go West, Young Man is a 1918 American silent comedy Western film directed by Harry Beaumont and starring Tom Moore, Ora Carew and Melbourne MacDowell.

== Cast ==
- Tom Moore as Dick Latham
- Ora Carew as Rosa Crimmins
- Melbourne MacDowell as Amos Latham
- Jack Richardson as Hugh Godson
- Mollie McConnell as Mrs Latham
- Edward Coxen as Dandy Jim
- James Robert Chandler as Crimmins
- Hector V. Sarno as Joe
