= Western Luck =

1924 film

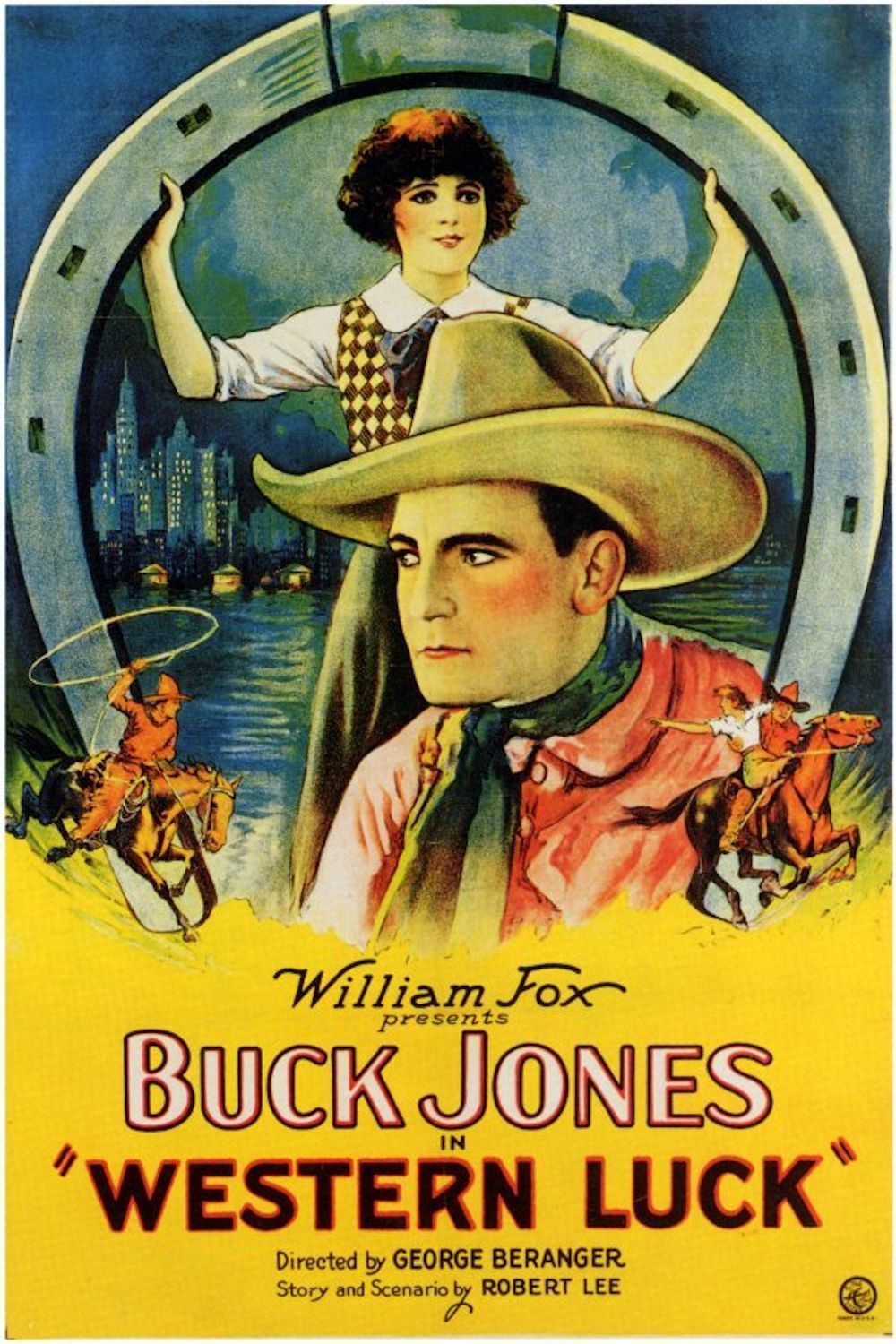
- Theatrical release poster
- Directed by: George Beranger
- Screenplay by: Robert N. Lee
- Starring: Buck Jones; Beatrice Burnham; Pat Hartigan; Thomas G. Lingham; J. Farrell MacDonald; Edith Kennick
- Cinematography: Joseph Brotherton
- Production company: Fox Film Corporation
- Distributed by: Fox Film Corporation
- Release date: June 22, 1924
- Running time: 50 minutes
- Country: United States
- Languages: Silent; English intertitles

Western Luck is a 1924 American silent Western film directed by George Beranger and starring Buck Jones, Beatrice Burnham, Pat Hartigan, Thomas G. Lingham, J. Farrell MacDonald and Edith Kennick. Written by Robert N. Lee, the film was released on June 22, 1924, by Fox Film Corporation.

== Cast ==
- Buck Jones as Larry Campbell
- Beatrice Burnham as Betty Gray
- Pat Hartigan as James Evart
- Thomas G. Lingham as Lem Pearson
- J. Farrell MacDonald as 'Chuck' Campbell
- Edith Kennick as Mrs. Pearson
- Bruce Gordon as Leonard Pearson
