= Beyond the Crossroads =

1922 film

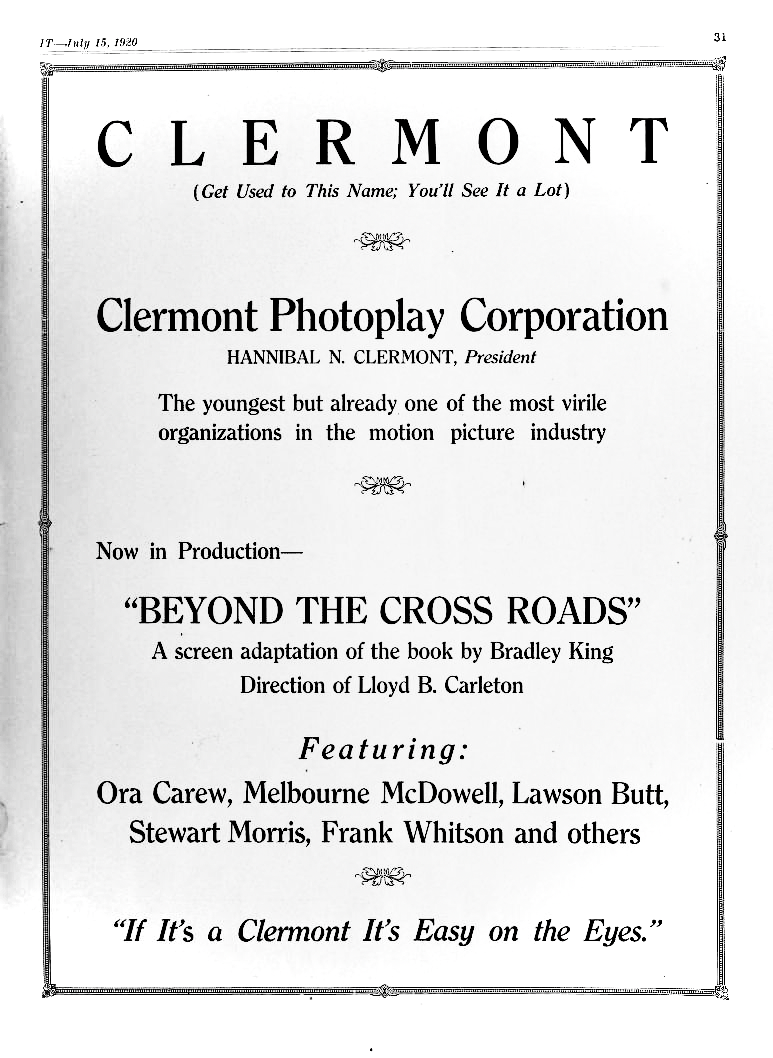
- Industry notice that film was in production
- Directed by: Lloyd Carleton
- Written by: Bradley King (story)
- Produced by: Pioneer Film Corporation
- Starring: Ora Carew
- Distributed by: Pioneer Film Corporation
- Release date: June 1922
- Running time: 5 reels
- Country: United States
- Language: Silent (English intertitles)

Beyond the Crossroads is a 1922 American silent melodrama film starring Ora Carew and Lawson Butt. It was directed by Lloyd Carleton.

This film survives in the Library of Congress collection.

== Cast ==
- Ora Carew as Leila Wilkes
- Lawson Butt as John Pierce / James Fordham
- Melbourne MacDowell as David Walton / Truman Breese
- Stuart Morris as Charles Wilked
- Joseph Johnson as Mean Man
