= Blind Youth =

1920 film by Edward Sloman

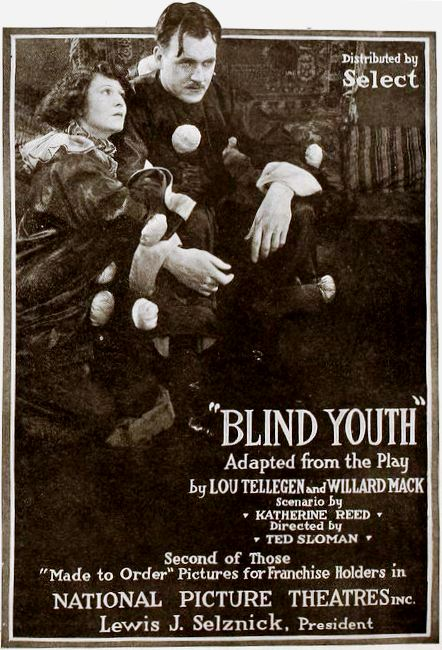
- Advertisement
- Directed by: Edward Sloman
- Written by: Frank W. Jamison (art titles); Katherine S. Reed
- Based on: Blind Youth (play) by Lou Tellegen and Willard Mack
- Produced by: Lewis J. Selznick
- Starring: Walter McGrail; Leatrice Joy; Claire McDowell
- Cinematography: Max Dupont
- Production company: National Picture Theaters
- Distributed by: Select Pictures
- Release date: March 1920
- Running time: 60 min.
- Country: United States
- Language: Silent (English intertitles)

Blind Youth is a 1920 American silent drama film directed by Edward Sloman and starring Walter McGrail, Leatrice Joy, and Claire McDowell. It was based upon the play of the same name by Lou Tellegen and Willard Mack. It is not known whether the film currently survives.

== Plot ==
As described in a film magazine, when Elizabeth (McDowell) and Pierre Monnier (Swickard) part, the mother takes one son, Henry (Kinny), while the father takes the other, Maurie (McGrail), to Paris. Maurie shows promise as a sculptor, but his life is ruined when he marries Clarice (Carew) and she deserts him to go with Jules Chandoce, a returning soldier. When his father dies, Maurie returns to New York, but finds his mother and brother ashamed of him. He walks the street for a time and contemplates suicide, but becomes inspired after meeting artist model Hope Martin (Joy). With her posing for him he makes a figure called "Blind Youth" which makes him famous overnight. After confessing his love to Hope, he tells her of his unfortunate marriage. Clarice reappears to share Maurie's recent fortune, but, after finally realizing that his happiness means more to her than money, she confesses to him that their marriage was illegal as Chandoce really was her husband. Maurie and Hope then wed.

== Cast ==
- Walter McGrail as Maurie Monnier
- Leatrice Joy as Hope Martin
- Ora Carew as Clarice Monnier
- Claire McDowell as Elizabeth Monnier
- Josef Swickard as Pierre Monnier
- Charles A. Post as American Tubby
- Leo White as French Louis
- Helen Howard as Matilda Packard
- Clara Horton as Bobo
- Colin Kinny as Henry Monnier

== Production ==
Two hundred extras were used in a scene set in the world of a "bohemian" New York cabaret. Director Sloan completed the film after Alfred E. Green became ill.
