= Lawson Butt =

British actor and film director (1883–1956)

W. Lawson Butt
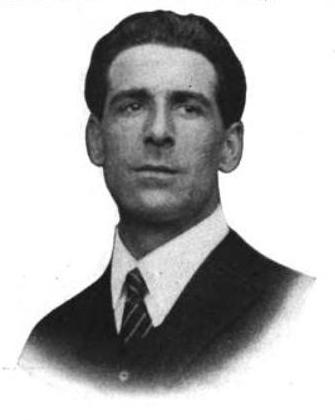
- Butt in film journal, 1915
- Born: Wilfred Lawson Butt; 4 March 1883; Bristol, England
- Died: 14 January 1956 (aged 72); Hampshire, England
- Occupation: Actor
- Relatives: Dame Clara Butt (sister)

W. Lawson Butt (4 March 1883 – 14 January 1956) was a British actor and film director of the silent era. His sister was opera singer Clara Butt.

== Selected filmography ==
Actor

- The Woman Next Door (1915)
- Romeo and Juliet (1916)
- The Danger Trail (1917)
- Shackled (1918)
- Playthings of Passion (1919)
- Desert Gold (1919)
- It Happened in Paris (1919)
- The Miracle Man (1919) (*uncredited though substantial part in film)
- The World and Its Woman (1919)
- The Loves of Letty (1919)
- Earthbound (1920)
- The Tiger's Coat (1920)
- The Sting of the Lash (1921)
- Beyond the Crossroads (1922)
- The Masquerader (1922)
- The Flying Dutchman (1923)
- Dante's Inferno (1924)
- The Chicago Fire (1925)
- Nine and Three-Fifths Seconds (1925)
- The Beloved Rogue (1927)
- Old San Francisco (1927)
- The Ringer (1928)

Director

- Afterwards (1928)
