= The Danger Trail =

1917 film

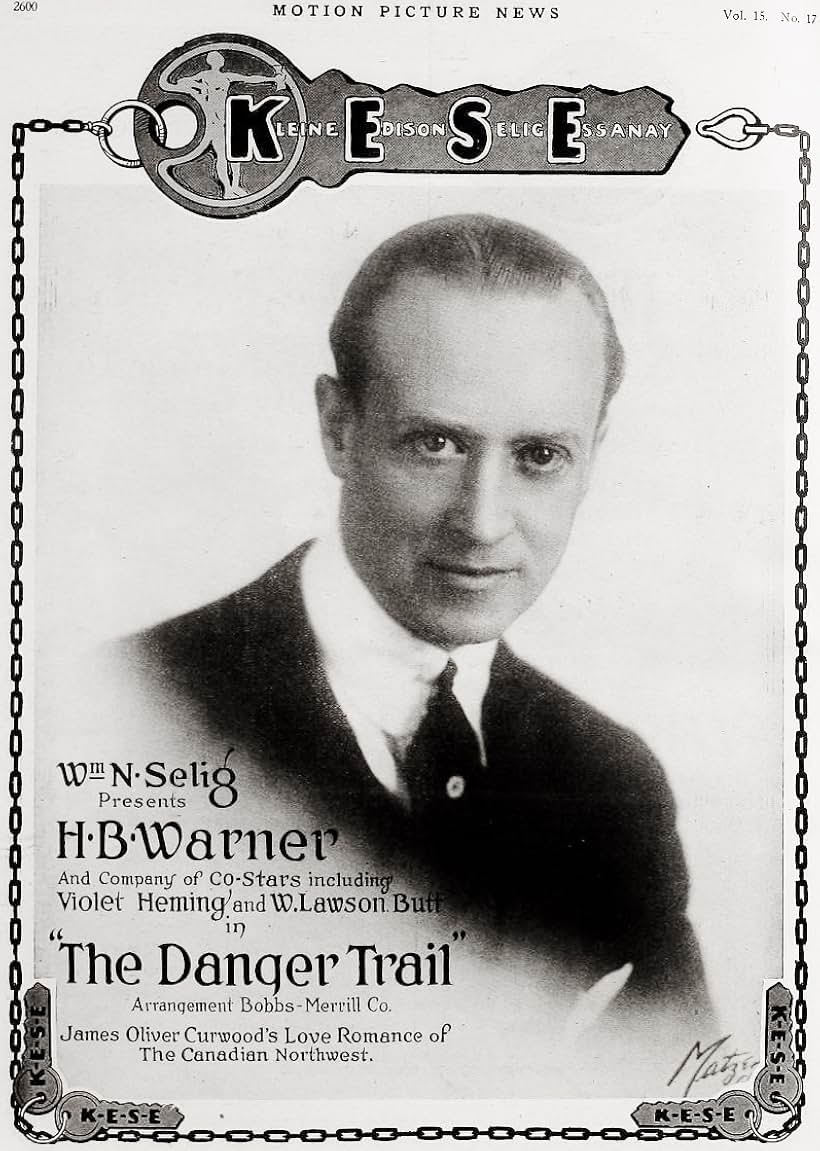
- Directed by: Frederick A. Thomson
- Written by: James Oliver Curwood (novel)
- Produced by: William N. Selig
- Starring: H.B. Warner; Violet Heming; Lawson Butt
- Production company: Selig Polyscope Company
- Distributed by: K-E-S-E Service
- Release date: April 30, 1917
- Running time: 50 minutes
- Country: United States
- Languages: Silent; English intertitles

The Danger Trail is a lost 1917 American silent adventure film directed by Frederick A. Thomson and starring H.B. Warner, Violet Heming and Lawson Butt. It is based on the 1910 novel of the same title by James Oliver Curwood. It is a Northern (genre), set during the construction of the Hudson Bay Railway in Canada.

== Cast ==
- H.B. Warner as John Howland
- Violet Heming as Meleese Thoreau
- Lawson Butt as Jean Croisset
- Arthur Donaldson as Pierre Thoreau
- Richard Thornton as Maax Thoreau
- Harold Howard as MacDonald
- William F. Cooper as Jackpine
- S.M. Unander as Thorne
- Arthur Cozine as François Thoreau

== Production ==
It was shot in Upstate New York (Port Henry, Lake Placid, Saranac Lake) and Chicago.

== Preservation ==
With no holdings located in archives, The Danger Trail is considered a lost film.
