= The Goldfish =

1924 American silent film by Jerome Storm

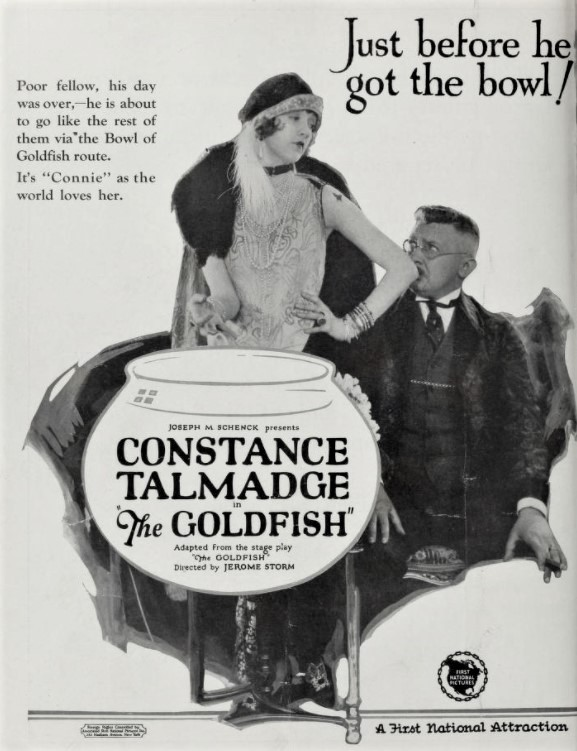
- Advertisement
- Directed by: Jerome Storm
- Written by: C. Gardner Sullivan
- Based on: The Goldfish by Gladys Unger
- Produced by: Joseph M. Schenck
- Starring: Constance Talmadge; Jack Mulhall; Frank Elliott
- Cinematography: Ray Binger
- Production company: Constance Talmadge Film Company
- Distributed by: First National Pictures
- Release date: March 30, 1924
- Running time: 70 minutes
- Country: United States
- Language: Silent (English intertitles)

The Goldfish is a 1924 American silent comedy film directed by Jerome Storm and starring Constance Talmadge, Jack Mulhall, and Frank Elliott.

== Plot ==
As described in a film magazine review, Jennie Wetherby and her husband Jimmy agree that if they tire of wedded life, she or he will hand the other a bowl of goldfish, signifying that their marital partnership is ended. They quarrel and Jimmy carries out the threat, giving Jenny a bowl of goldfish. Won by Herman Krauss, Jenny gives him the goldfish in favor of millionaire J. Hamilton Powers. The latter dies, leaving her a wealthy widow. She is about to wed the Duke of Middlesex, when Krauss brings the old sweethearts together again. The Duke gets the goldfish and Jimmy and Jenny are reunited.

== Cast ==
- Constance Talmadge as Jennie Wetherby
- Jack Mulhall as Jimmy Wetherby
- Frank Elliott as Duke of Middlesex
- Jean Hersholt as Herman Krauss
- ZaSu Pitts as Amelia Pugsley
- Edward Connelly as Count Nevski
- William Conklin as J. Hamilton Powers
- Leo White as Casmir
- Nellie Bly Baker as Ellen
- Kate Lester as Mrs. Bellmore
- Eric Mayne as The Prince
- William Wellesley as Mr. Crane
- Jacqueline Gadsdon as Helen Crane
- Percy Williams as Wilton
- John Patrick as Reporter

== Preservation ==
An incomplete copy of The Goldfish is held by the Library of Congress.

== Bibliography ==
- Munden, Kenneth White. The American Film Institute Catalog of Motion Pictures Produced in the United States, Part 1. University of California Press, 1997.
