= Somebody's Mother =

1926 film

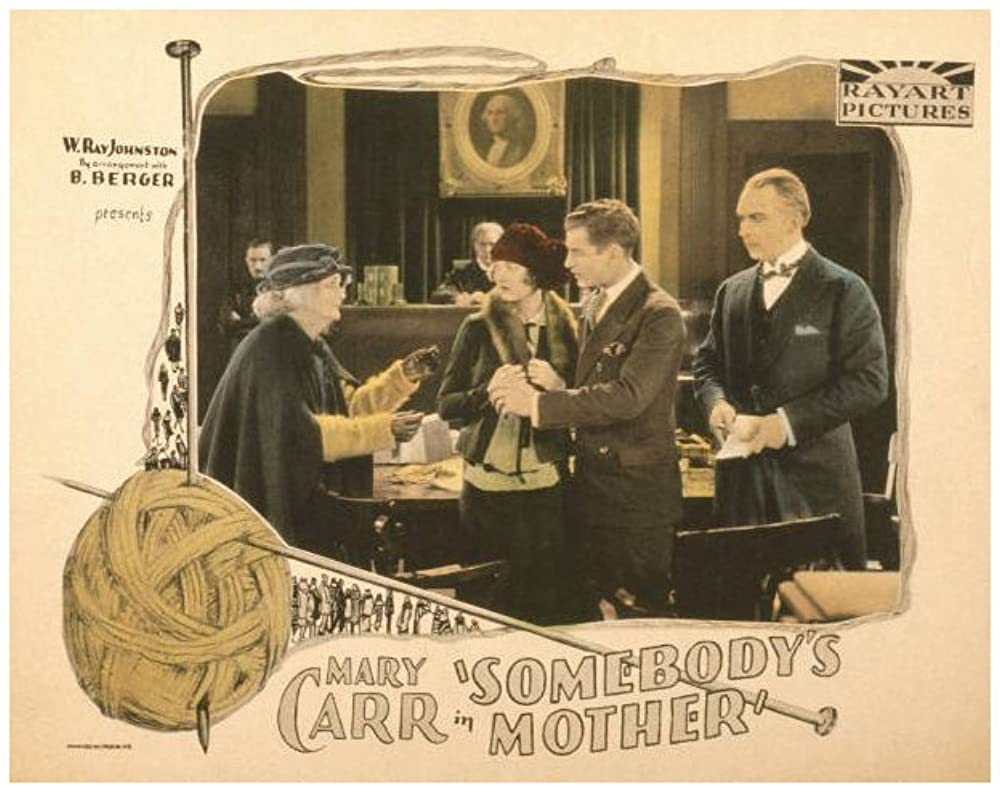
- Directed by: Oscar Apfel
- Written by: Oscar Apfel
- Produced by: W. Ray Johnston; Harry Gordon
- Starring: Mary Carr; Rex Lease; Kathryn McGuire
- Cinematography: Gilbert Warrenton
- Production company: Harry Garson Productions
- Distributed by: Rayart Pictures; Butcher's Film Service (UK)
- Release date: March 17, 1926
- Running time: 50 minutes
- Country: United States
- Language: Silent (English intertitles)

Somebody's Mother is a 1926 American silent drama film directed by Oscar Apfel and starring Mary Carr, Rex Lease, and Kathryn McGuire.

== Plot ==
As described in a film magazine review, Mary roams the streets sells matches on the streets of New York, but unknown to everyone she encounters she is really searching for her son who was kidnapped from her many years ago when he was a young boy. Meanwhile, she adopts an Irish waif, practicing her mothering techniques. She finally meets the banker, and implores him to tell where her son is concealed, but he ignores her. Her son Peter is registered at a hotel with his new bride, and he quarrels with the banker, whom he believes is his uncle. Mary goes to the banker's home, and Peter also is headed there to try to get him to recognize his new wife, whom the banker considers to be a gold digger. A servant returning to the home later finds the banker dead. A court later tries and convicts Peter based upon circumstantial evidence, but Mary steps in to claim that she killed the banker. Then a policeman appears with the information that two yeggs confessed to the murder. An old friend of Mary's produces documentary evidence proving that the banker had Peter taken away as a child from Mary years before on the grounds that she was not morally fit to raise him.

== Cast ==
- Mary Carr as Mary, aka 'Matches' Mary
- Rex Lease as Peter
- Mickey McBan as Peter, as a Young Boy
- Kathryn McGuire as Peter's Sweetheart
- Sidney Franklin as Foster
- Edward Martindel as Mary's Lawyer
- Robert Graves
- Fletcher Tolbert

== Bibliography ==
- Connelly, Robert B. The Silents: Silent Feature Films, 1910–36, Volume 40, Issue 2. December Press, 1998.
- Munden, Kenneth White. The American Film Institute Catalog of Motion Pictures Produced in the United States, Part 1. University of California Press, 1997.
