= The Torrent (1924 film) =

1924 film by A. P. Younger and William Doner

- Directed by: A. P. Younger; William Doner
- Written by: A. P. Younger
- Based on: The Torrent short story by Langdon McCormick
- Produced by: Phil Goldstone
- Starring: William Fairbanks; Ora Carew; Frank Elliott
- Cinematography: Edgar Lyons; Roland Price; Paul Allen
- Production company: Phil Goldstone Productions
- Distributed by: Truart Film Corporation
- Release date: August 1, 1924 (US)
- Running time: 6 reels
- Country: United States
- Language: Silent (English intertitles)

The Torrent is a lost 1924 American silent melodrama film directed by A. P. Younger and William Doner, from a screenplay by A. P. Younger. The film stars William Fairbanks, Ora Carew, and Frank Elliott.

== Cast ==
- William Fairbanks as Hale Garrison
- Ora Carew as Gloria Manner
- Frank Elliott as Ernest Leeds
- Joseph Kilgour as Leed's friend
- Gertrude Astor as The Cast-off
- June Elvidge as The friend
- Fontaine La Rue as Dancing girl
- Ashley Cooper as Butler
- Robert McKim as Detective
- Charles K. French as Captain (credited as Charles French)
