= Wheel of Chance =

1928 film

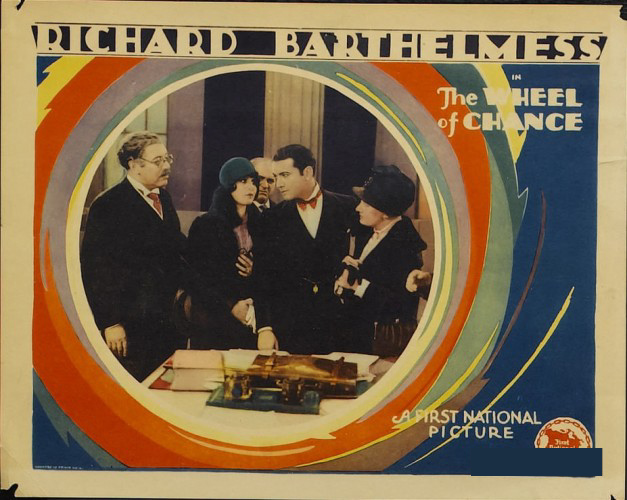
- Directed by: Alfred Santell
- Written by: Gerald Duffy; Garrett Graham (titles)
- Based on: a short story Roulette by Fannie Hurst
- Produced by: First National Pictures
- Starring: Richard Barthelmess; Warner Oland
- Cinematography: Ernest Haller
- Edited by: Cyril Gardner
- Distributed by: First National Pictures
- Release date: June 17, 1928
- Running time: 70 minutes
- Country: United States
- Language: Silent..English titles

Wheel of Chance is a lost 1928 silent film feature directed by Alfred Santell and starring Richard Barthelmess. It was produced and distributed by First National Pictures.

== Cast ==
- Richard Barthelmess as Nilolai Turkeltaub/Jacob Taline
- Bodil Rosing as Sara Turkeltaub
- Warner Oland as Mosher Turkeltaub
- Anne Schaefer as Hanscha Talinef
- Lina Basquette as Ada Berkowitz
- Margaret Livingston as Josie Drew
- Sidney Franklin as Pa Berkowitz
- Martha Franklin as Ma Berkowitz
- Lon Poff (uncredited)
- Robert Nolan (uncredited)

== Preservation status ==
- The film is currently considered lost.
