= The Love Pirate =

1923 film

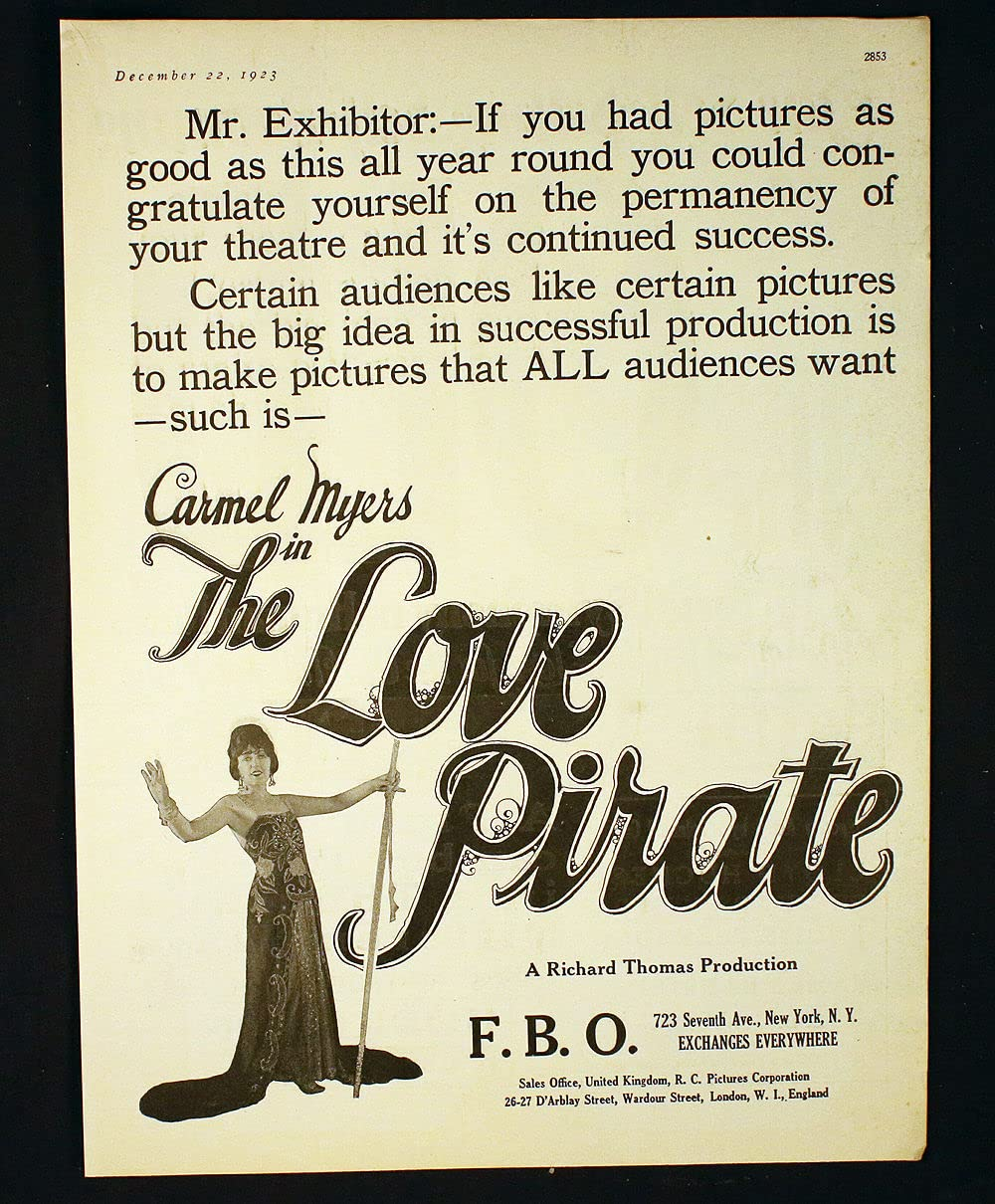
- Directed by: Richard Thomas
- Written by: William Berke
- Starring: Melbourne MacDowell; Carmel Myers; Kathryn McGuire
- Cinematography: Jack Fuqua
- Production company: Richard Thomas Productions
- Distributed by: Film Booking Offices of America
- Release date: November 18, 1923
- Running time: 50 minutes
- Country: United States
- Languages: Silent; English intertitles

The Love Pirate is a 1923 American silent drama film directed by Richard Thomas and starring Melbourne MacDowell, Carmel Myers and Kathryn McGuire.

== Plot summary ==
Ruth Revere, a rising musician, is in love with her sweetheart, Hugh Waring. Meanwhile, Steve Carnan, a cafe owner, is attempting to seduce Ruth, resulting in Waring killing him after a fight. With Chief Deputy Waring under suspicion, a confession from Ruth's father saves him.

== Cast ==
- Melbourne MacDowell as Steve Carnan
- Carmel Myers as Ruby Le Maar
- Charles Force as Tim Gordan
- Kathryn McGuire as Ruth Revere
- Clyde Fillmore as Chief Deputy Hugh Waring
- John Tonkey as Cregg Winslow
- Carol Holloway as Mrs. Carnan
- Edward W. Borman as Joe Harris
- Spottiswoode Aitken as Cyrus Revere

== Preservation ==
With no prints of The Love Pirate located in any film archives, it is considered a lost film.

== Bibliography ==
- Connelly, Robert B. The Silents: Silent Feature Films, 1910-36, Volume 40, Issue 2. December Press, 1998.
- Munden, Kenneth White. The American Film Institute Catalog of Motion Pictures Produced in the United States, Part 1. University of California Press, 1997.
