= Academy of Music (Montreal) =

Former theatre and concert hall in Montreal, Canada

The Academy of Music (fr: Académie de musique), sometimes referred to as the Montreal Academy of Music, was a historic theatre and concert hall in Montreal, Quebec, Canada that opened in 1875 and was later demolished in 1910.

== History ==
Montreal’s Academy of Music (Académie de musique) was built by a company owned by Sir Hugh Allan—a known shipping magnate in the 19th century. The theatre sat 2100 people, and was situated on the east side of Victoria Street just north of Saint Catherine Street. The theatre's inauguration occurred on November 15, 1875, with a performance of Lester Wallack's drama Rosedale; or, the Rifle Ball led by actors E.A. McDowell and Fanny Reeves.

The Academy was an important Montreal performance venue: Calixa Lavallée directed performances of Gounod’s Jeanne d’Arc there in 1877; Emma Albani and her troupe performed the operas La Traviata and Lucia di Lammermoor there in 1890 and Lohengrin and Les Huguenots in 1892; Blanche Walsh and Melbourne MacDowell appeared there in Sardou’s Gismonda in 1899; and the premiere of Victor Herbert’s Cyrano de Bergerac was presented there on September 11, 1899. The Montreal Symphony Orchestra, under J.J. Goulet, also performed there from 1903–1910.

The building was demolished in 1910 for the expansion of the Goodwin department store, later Eaton’s.
