= Alias Ladyfingers =

1921 film

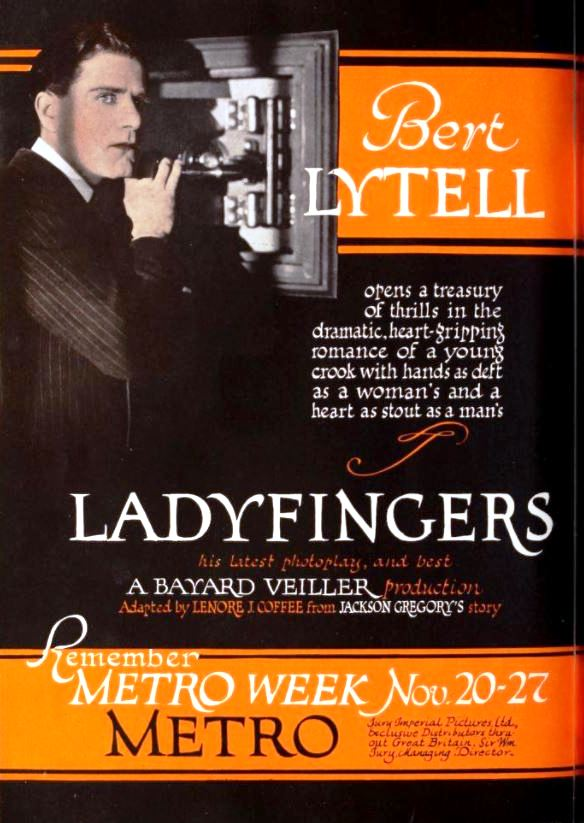
- Advertisement
- Directed by: Bayard Veiller
- Screenplay by: Lenore J. Coffee
- Based on: Ladyfingers (novel) by Jackson Gregory
- Starring: Bert Lytell; Ora Carew; Frank Elliot
- Cinematography: Arthur Martinelli
- Production company: Metro Pictures Corporation
- Distributed by: Metro Pictures Corporation
- Release date: October 31, 1921
- Running time: 6 reels
- Country: United States
- Language: Silent (English intertitles)

Alias Ladyfingers, also known as Ladyfingers, is a lost 1921 American silent comedy film based on the 1920 mystery novel Ladyfingers by Jackson Gregory. It was adapted for the screen by Lenore Coffee and was directed by Bayard Veiller. The film stars Bert Lytell, Ora Carew, Frank Elliot, Edythe Chapman, and DeWitt Jennings. The film was produced and distributed by Metro Pictures Corporation.

== Plot ==
Rachel Stetherill disapproves of her daughter's choice for a husband, and therefore disowns her. After her daughter dies, Rachel refuses to help the child she has left behind. The boy is adopted by a safecracker, and soon excels at the profession. The boy grows up as Robert Ashe, and becomes a safecracker renowned for his delicate hands and touch, hence the moniker "Ladyfingers". A lawyer, Justin Haddon, is trying to find Robert, who will inherit his grandmother's estate if he is found. If he is not located, Rachel's ward, Enid Camden, will inherit the estate, and it is Haddon's intention to marry Enid. But Robert meets Enid and falls in love with her. Haddon suspects that Robert is a thief and invites him to Rachel's home, expecting him to steal her string of pearls. The pearls disappear and the police suspect Ladyfingers, but the pearls are found and the case is dismissed. Rachel notices the resemblance between him and her son-in-law, and soon realizes that he is her grandson. When his past is revealed, Ladyfingers confesses his crimes and agrees to go to jail for two years to pay his debt to society. After his release from his prison term, he takes up farming and is happily married to Enid.

== Cast ==
- Bert Lytell as Robert Ashe (Ladyfingers)
- Ora Carew as Enid Camden
- Frank Elliott as Justin Haddon
- Edythe Chapman as Rachel Stetherill
- DeWitt Jennings as Lieutenant Ambrose
- Stanley Goethals as Robert Ashe (age 4)

== Reviews and reception ==
A review in the Exhibitors Trade Review for the film when it played at The Rialto Theater in Allentown, Pennsylvania, said it was a "first-rate crook drama, with star well known and liked in Allentown. Sequence was good run, with attendance better than for some time". When the film played at the Kings Theatre in St. Louis, Lytell appeared in person in conjunction with the film for three days and "proved to be a real drawing card", according to the Exhibitors Trade Review. Lytell also appeared in person, three times daily, at the Strand Theater in Milwaukee, and his appearance "boosted the box office receipts way up...and [he] was given a most generous welcome by his audiences". A review in the Exhibitors' Herald from 1923, said "this is a mighty good crook picture, be sure and let your people know what you have, as the name hurts business".

When the film played in Pasadena, California, a stationer used pictures of scenes from the film for a window display. Blue cards were placed beside the items for sale, with advertising slogans that read: "We carry Check Protective Ink to guard your signature against the clever Alias Ladyfingers", and another slogan read, "Even on your desk your valuable papers should be kept in our Steel Bond Boxes for fast is the work of the visiting Alias Ladyfingers".
