= Diamonds Adrift =

1921 silent film

Thelma
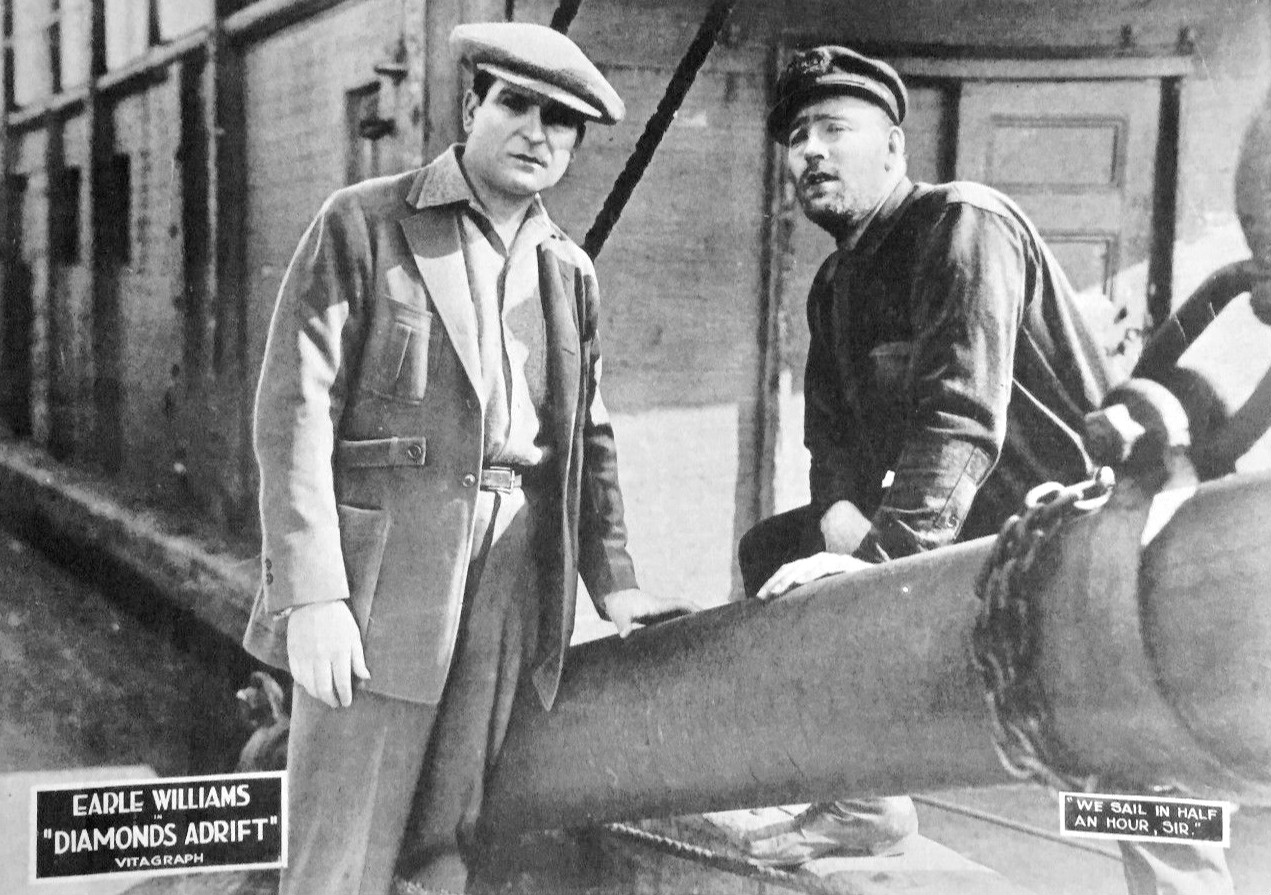
- Directed by: Chester Bennett
- Written by: Frederick J. Jackson
- Starring: Earle Williams; Beatrice Burnham; Otis Harlan
- Cinematography: Jack MacKenzie
- Production company: Vitagraph Company of America
- Distributed by: Vitagraph Company of America
- Release date: January 1921
- Running time: 50 minutes
- Country: United States
- Languages: Silent; English intertitles

Diamonds Adrift is a 1921 American silent romantic comedy film directed by Chester Bennett and starring Earle Williams, Beatrice Burnham and Otis Harlan.

== Cast ==
- Earle Williams as Bob Bellamy
- Beatrice Burnham as Consuelo Velasco
- Otis Harlan as Brick McCann
- George Field as Don Manuel Morales
- Jack Carlyle as Home Brew
- Hector V. Sarno as Señor Rafael Velasco
- Melbourne MacDowell as James Bellamy

== Bibliography ==
- Munden, Kenneth White. The American Film Institute Catalog of Motion Pictures Produced in the United States, Part 1. University of California Press, 1997.
