= The Flame of Life =

1923 film by Hobart Henley

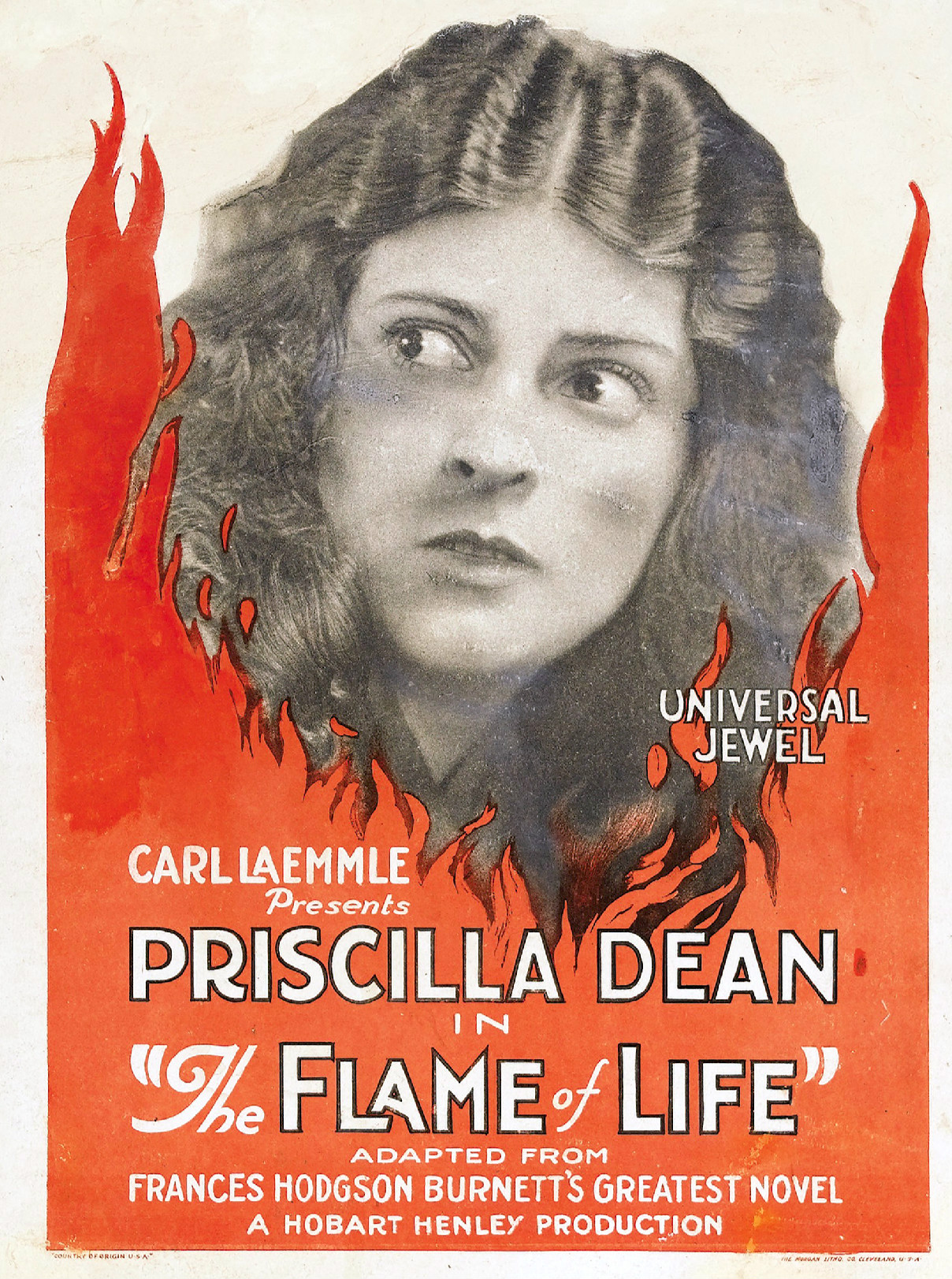
- Window card from March 1923
- The Flame of Life
- Directed by: Hobart Henley
- Written by: Frances Hodgson Burnett
- Screenplay by: Elliott J. Clawson
- Based on: That Lass o' Lowrie's by F. H. Burnett
- Produced by: Carl Laemmle
- Starring: Priscilla Dean; Robert Ellis; Kathryn McGuire; Wallace Beery
- Cinematography: Virgil Miller
- Color process: Blank and white
- Production company: Universal Pictures
- Distributed by: Universal Pictures
- Release date: February 5, 1923
- Running time: 7 reels; 5780 feet
- Country: United States
- Language: Silent (English intertitles)

The Flame of Life (also known as That Lass o' Lowrie's) is a 1923 American silent drama film starring Priscilla Dean, Robert Ellis, Kathryn McGuire, and Wallace Beery. The film was written by Elliott J. Clawson from the Frances Hodgson Burnett novel That Lass o' Lowrie's and directed by Hobart Henley.

A print of The Flame of Life is currently housed in the NBCUniversal Syndication Studios archives, but is available for the company's internal research and referencing purposes only and is not available to the general public.

== Plot ==
As described in a film magazine, Joan Lowrie (Dean) is one of the beasts of burden making up the population of the little English mining village. Culling slate from coal all day long with a score of broken-down hags, young women, and girls, she lived a life of horror at home, beaten constantly by her father. The mine receives a new over-man, Fergus Derrick (Ellis), trying to get on friendly terms with the drudging slaves, but meets a spirit of independence that proved the people better than animals. Fergus advocated for better working conditions, but the mine owners laughed at him. Dan Lowrie (Beery) was caught smoking in a shaft by the over-man and was fired. Dan threatened murder and when attempting it the over-man was saved by Joan. The young superintendent then learns in various ways of her hidden nobleness of character and also of her father's cruelty. In time the young woman and the over-man break down the wall of class between them. Assisting in her education, seeing her prove her worthiness by her actions during a mine disaster, Fergus falls deeply in love with her and their happiness came with ceaseless efforts.

== Cast ==
- Priscilla Dean as Joan Lowrie
- Robert Ellis as Fergus Derrick
- Kathryn McGuire as Alice Barholm
- Wallace Beery as Dan Lowrie
- Fred Kohler as Spring
- Beatrice Burnham as Liz
- Emmett King as Barholm
- Frankie Lee as Jud
- Grace de Garro as Mag
- Dorothy Hagen as Baroness
- Evelyn McCoy as Fauntleroy
- Nancy Caswell (uncredited)
- Mickey Daniels (uncredited)

== Production ==
The Flame of Life is one of the films which has had several internal production conflicts which resulted in constant changes in decisions with the basic information related to the film. One such example is the constant change of its name. The film was marketed all across the United States with the name The Lass o' Lowrie's after the name of the novel the storyline was adapted from in 1922. However, in January 1923, just a few days before its release, the company decided to go ahead with The Flame of Life.

Another interesting fact dates back to 1916. On November 21, 1921, the Motion Picture News revealed that the playwright Elliott Clawson was working on rewriting the script of the Bluebird Photoplays feature Secret Love (1916), which was also based on the novel That Lass o' Lowrie's, thus revealing to the audience a bit of what they might expect but the release was rather received with surprise since the storyline was actually adapted directly from the novel but in a completely different way than how Secret Love was written with the highlights being major changes in the overall setting and a major change in genre.
