= Trooper O'Neill =

1922 film

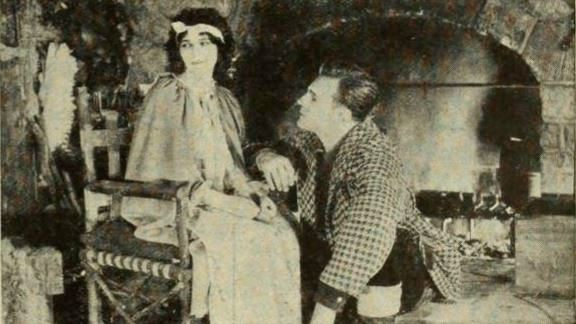
- Beatrice Burnham and Buck Jones in a still.
- Directed by: Scott R. Dunlap
- Written by: George Goodchild; William K. Howard
- Produced by: William Fox
- Starring: Buck Jones; Beatrice Burnham; Francis McDonald
- Cinematography: Lucien N. Andriot
- Production company: Fox Film
- Distributed by: Fox Film
- Release date: July 16, 1922
- Running time: 50 minutes
- Country: United States
- Languages: Silent; English intertitles

Trooper O'Neill is a 1922 American silent Western film directed by Scott R. Dunlap and starring Buck Jones, Beatrice Burnham, and Francis McDonald.

== Cast ==
- Buck Jones as Trooper O'Neill
- Beatrice Burnham as Marie
- Francis McDonald as Pierre
- Claude Payton as Black Flood
- Sid Jordan as Rodd
- Jack Rollens as Paul
- Karl Formes as Jules Lestrange

== Bibliography ==
- Solomon, Aubrey. The Fox Film Corporation, 1915-1935: A History and Filmography. McFarland, 2011.
