= The Little Fool =

1921 film by Phil Rosen

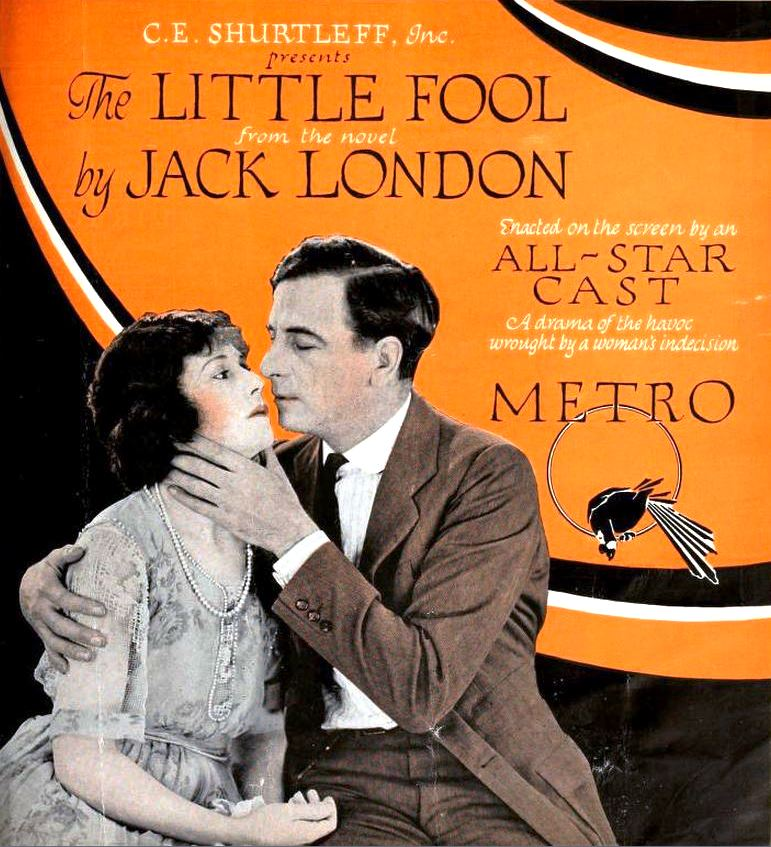
- Directed by: Phil Rosen
- Starring: Milton Sills; Frances Wadsworth; Nigel Barrie
- Production company: Metro Pictures
- Distributed by: Metro Pictures
- Release date: May 1, 1921
- Running time: 60 minutes
- Country: United States
- Languages: Silent; English intertitles

The Little Fool is a 1921 American silent drama film directed by Phil Rosen and starring Milton Sills, Frances Wadsworth and Nigel Barrie.

== Cast ==
- Milton Sills as Dick
- Frances Wadsworth as Florence
- Nigel Barrie as Evan
- Ora Carew
- Byron Munson
- Peggy Prevost
- Helen Howard

== Bibliography ==
- James Robert Parish & Michael R. Pitts. Film directors: a guide to their American films. Scarecrow Press, 1974.
