= The Printer's Devil (film) =

1923 film

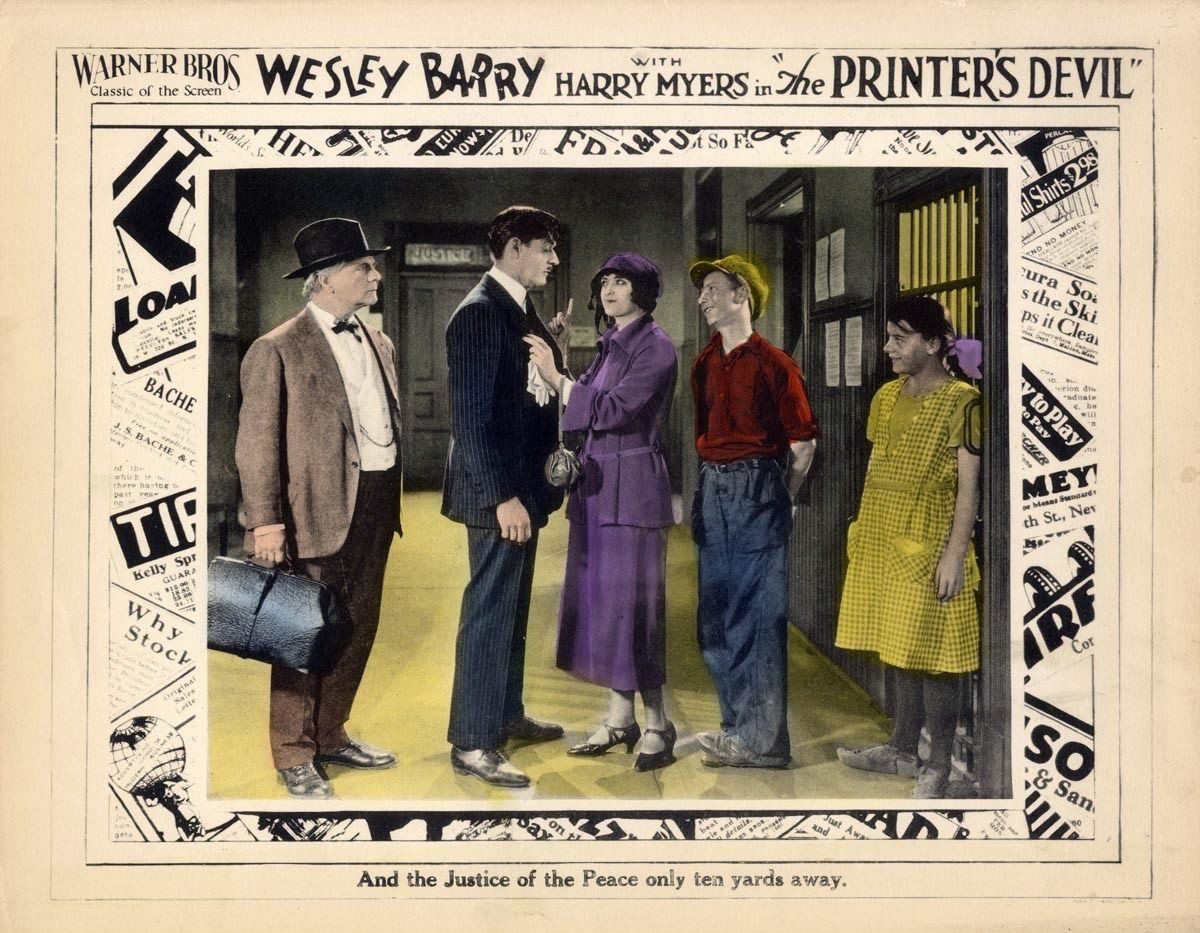
- Lobby card with George C. Pearce, Harry Myers, Kathryn McGuire, Wesley Barry, and Mary Halter
- Directed by: William Beaudine
- Screenplay by: Julien Josephson
- Based on: "Ink Slinger" by Julien Josephson
- Edited by: Clarence Kolster
- Distributed by: Warner Bros. Pictures
- Release date: August 21, 1923
- Running time: 6 reels
- Country: United States
- Language: Silent (English intertitles)
- Budget: $80,000
- Box office: $263,000

The Printer's Devil is a 1923 American silent drama film directed by William Beaudine and released by Warner Bros. It stars Wesley Barry, Harry Myers, and Kathryn McGuire.

== Plot ==
As described in a film magazine review, Brick Hubbard, a printer's devil, induces Sidney Fletcher to buy the town newspaper, The Gazette. An editorial written by Sidney arouses the wrath of the town banker Ira Gates, whose daughter Vivian is whom Sidney loves. When the bank is robbed, Sidney is suspected. Though the efforts of Brick the actual criminals are arrested and Sidney wins the affection of Vivian.

== Cast ==
- Wesley Barry as Brick Hubbard
- Harry Myers as Sidney Fletcher
- Kathryn McGuire as Vivian Gates
- Louis King as Lem Kirk
- George C. Pearce as Ira Gates
- Raymond Cannon as Alec Sperry
- Mary Halter as Dora Kirk
- Harry L. Rattenberry as Chet Quimby

== Reception ==
According to Warner Bros. records, the film earned $243,000 domestically and $20,000 foreign.
