= Frank Elliott (actor) =

English actor (1880–1970)

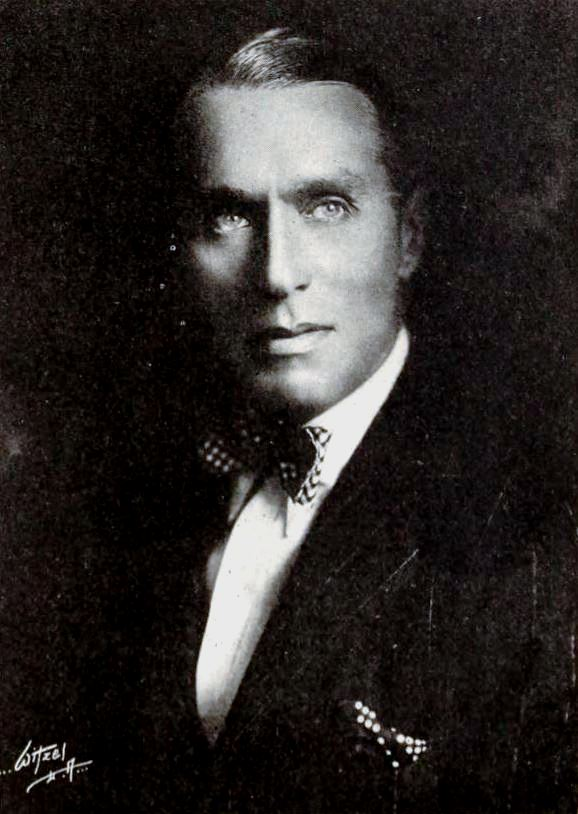
- Frank Elliott
- Born: 11 February 1880; Cheshire, England
- Died: July 1970 (aged 90); England
- Occupation: Actor
- Years active: 1915–1966
- Spouse: Dorothy Cumming
- Children: 2

Frank Elliott (11 February 1880 – July 1970) was an English film actor. He appeared in more than 70 films between 1915 and 1966. He was born in Cheshire, England.

Elliott was married to actress Dorothy Cumming, and they had two children.

== Selected filmography ==
- Cora (1915)
- Nearly a Lady (1915)
- The High Road (1915)
- Mr. Grex of Monte Carlo (1915)
- The Double Standard (1917)
- The Love That Dares (1919)
- Love Insurance (1919)
- The Railroader (1919)
- The Scarlet Shadow (1919)
- Wings of the Morning (1919)
- Once to Every Woman (1920)
- The Hope (1920)
- Alias Ladyfingers (1921)
- The Last Card (1921)
- The Speed Girl (1921)
- The Impossible Mrs. Bellew (1922)
- Ruggles of Red Gap (1923)
- Gentle Julia (1923)
- Garrison's Finish (1923)
- Red Lights (1923)
- Secrets (1924)
- The Goldfish (1924)
- Love's Wilderness (1924)
- The Torrent (1924)
- Tearing Through (1925)
- Speed Wild (1925)
- The Lady from Hell (1926)
- Fourth Commandment (1926)
- The Tender Hour (1927)
- Easy Virtue (1928)
- Take the Heir (1930)
- Zis Boom Bah (1941)
- Life With Father (1947)
- Darling, How Could You! (1951)
