= The Sea Master =

- Theatrical release poster
- Directed by: Edward Sloman
- Starring: William Russell; Francelia Billington; George Fisher
- Cinematography: Joe Morgan
- Production company: American Film Company
- Distributed by: Mutual Film Corporation
- Release date: October 22, 1917
- Running time: 5 reels
- Country: United States
- Language: Silent (English intertitles)

The Sea Master is a 1917 silent adventure films directed by Edward Sloman. It was distributed by Mutual Film.

== Plot ==
Bull Dorgan, skipper of the Southern Cross, is a master of men. Emma Gordon has been called to the bedside of a dying friend in a notorious dance hall. The owner attempts to keep her there. Dorgan hears her cries, goes to her rescue and carries her aboard his ship in making the escape. Dorgan doubts the girl's story of her presence in the resort. Circumstances work against her proof. He forces her to marry him, but later regrets it when he finds her Bible and note sent by her friend summoning her to the resort. He tries in vain to win her forgiveness. A child is born to them. The baby falls ill. Dorgan suspects his wife's fidelity. A mutiny on board his ship brings out Dorgan's manhood, and because of his great love for the baby the girl throws her arms around his neck and forgives him for the past.

== Cast ==
- William Russell as Bull Dorgan
- Francelia Billington as Emily Gordon
- George Fisher as Hugh
- Joseph King as Pedro
- George Ahern as Scotty
- Clarence Burton as Portuguese Joe
- Rena Carlton as Lola
- Helen Howard as Mazie
- Perry Banks as Dr. Blakely

== Reception ==
A contemporary review in Motion Picture News praised William Russell's performance. A review in the Herald Statesman also praised Russell's performance, calling it his best in a long time.
