= Ora Carew =

American actress (1893-1955)

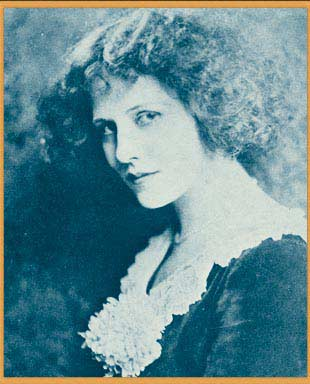
- Carew in Who's Who on the Screen, 1920
- Born: Ora Whytock; April 19, 1891; Salt Lake City, Utah, U.S.
- Died: October 26, 1955 (aged 64); Los Angeles, California, U.S.
- Resting place: Forest Lawn Memorial Park, Glendale
- Occupation: Actress
- Years active: 1915–1925
- Spouses: Harry E. Grant (m. 1908, divorced) John C. Howard (m. 1922; div. 1924)
- Children: 1
- Relatives: Grant Whytock (brother); Buzz Feitshans (grandson)

Ora Carew (née Whytock; April 19, 1891 – October 26, 1955) was an American silent film actress. Starring in several films between 1915 and 1925, she was known as one of the Sennett Bathing Beauties.

== Early life ==
Ora Whytock was born in Salt Lake City, Utah, to James Whytock and Evelyn Carn Whytock. She had an older sister, Evelyn Whytock Lehners, who became a music composer, and a younger brother, Grant Whytock, who became a film editor. Ora's birth year has been listed as 1893 on her death certificate and her grave, but the Utah birth index and the 1900 census indicate her birth year as 1891.

She was educated by private tutors and at Roland Hall Seminary. After her father died on June 19, 1896, her mother moved with her three children to California.

== Career ==
Carew acted on stage, including work in stock companies and in musical comedies, and was also a vaudeville performer. She acted on film with MGM and Universal.

== Later years and death ==
After a failed comeback in 1926, she continued to star in Los Angeles stage plays and toured with vaudeville acts. From 1940 until her death, she operated a cosmetics shop in Hollywood. Carew died of a stroke at a Los Angeles sanitarium on October 26, 1955, and was interred at Forest Lawn Memorial Park in Glendale, California.

== Personal life ==
Carew married Harry E. Grant on June 15, 1908 in El Paso, Texas. The couple had one daughter, Lotus Grant (October 20, 1909 – June 25, 2007), who married Fred R. Feitshans Jr., with their child being film producer Buzz Feitshans. Carew and Grant divorced before 1920.

Carew married John C. Howard in December 1922 in Hollywood, California, and they divorced in 1924.

Carew was particularly fond of outdoor sports and would often drive around Hollywood and Los Angeles in her Mercer Raceabout for recreation.

== Selected filmography ==
- Martyrs of the Alamo (1915)
- A La Cabaret (1916)
- Too Many Millions (1918)
- Go West, Young Man (1918)
- Terror of the Range (1919)
- Loot (1919)
- Peddler of Lies (1920)
- The Figurehead (1920)
- Blind Youth (1920)
- Her Bridal Nightmare (1920) (writer)
- Alias Ladyfingers (1921)
- After Your Own Heart (1921)
- The Little Fool (1921)
- A Voice in the Dark (1921)
- Beyond the Crossroads (1922)
- The Girl from Rocky Point (1922)
- Smiles Are Trumps (1922)
- Smudge (1922)
- Sherlock Brown (1922)
- Paying the Limit (1924)
- Getting Her Man (1924)
- The Torrent (1924)
