= Deserted at the Altar =

1922 silent film by William K. Howard

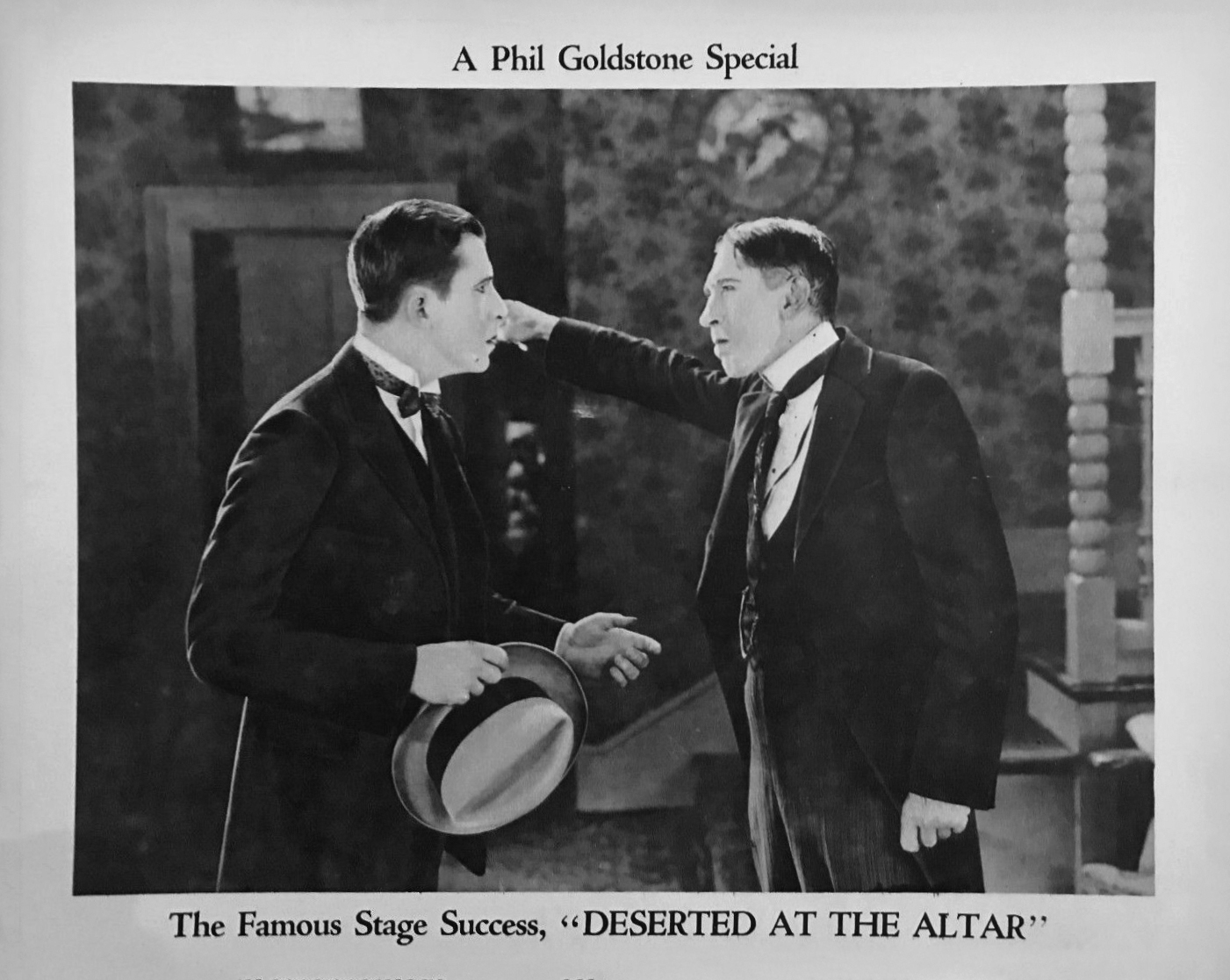
- Lobby card, 1922
- Directed by: William K. Howard
- Written by: Grace Miller White
- Based on: Deserted at the Altar (play) by Pierce Kingsley; Deserted at the Altar (novel) by Grace Miller White
- Produced by: Phil Goldstone
- Starring: Bessie Love; Tully Marshall
- Cinematography: Glen McWilliams; John Meigle
- Production company: Phil Goldstone Productions
- Release date: December 1, 1922 (U.S.)
- Running time: 7 reels
- Country: United States
- Language: Silent (English intertitles)

Deserted at the Altar is a 1922 American silent film melodrama directed by William K. Howard and produced by Phil Goldstone Productions. It stars Bessie Love and Tully Marshall.

The film is preserved at the Museum of Modern Art.

== Plot ==
Two villains plan to steal the inheritance of Anna Moore by marrying her. When her brother Tommy is hit by a car, the wealthy driver pays the doctor bills, and falls in love with Anna. This thwarts the villains' initial plans, so they go on to hire a woman to pose as the driver's estranged partner and mother of his child, and stop the wedding. When the woman reveals her true identity, the villains are exposed, and Anna and her rich fiancé are reunited.

== Cast ==
- Bessie Love as Anna Moore, the country girl
- Frankie Lee as Tommy Moore, the boy
- William Scott as Bob Crandall, the city chap
- Wade Boteler as John Simpson, the minister
- Tully Marshall as Squire Simpson
- Barbara Tennant as Nell Reed, the other woman
- Eulalie Jensen as the teacher
- Les Bates as the mob leader
- Edward McQuade as the sheriff
- Helen Howard as the gossip
- Queenie the Dog

== Production ==
The film is a Poverty Row (Gower Street) production, and was filmed in only ten days.

== Promotion and release ==
The film is notable for its then-novel methods of promotion, which included stunts, such as weddings in movie theaters, and staged "Just Married" car rides around town.

On its release, the film was shown with the short Fighting Blood in some theaters.

== Reception ==
Generally, the film received positive reviews, although some reviewers thought that "Director Howard has used nearly two reels too much in telling the story" and the plot twists were not believable. There was speculation that more clear title would have improved theater attendance even more.

The film was commercially successful.
