= The Figurehead (film) =

1920 film

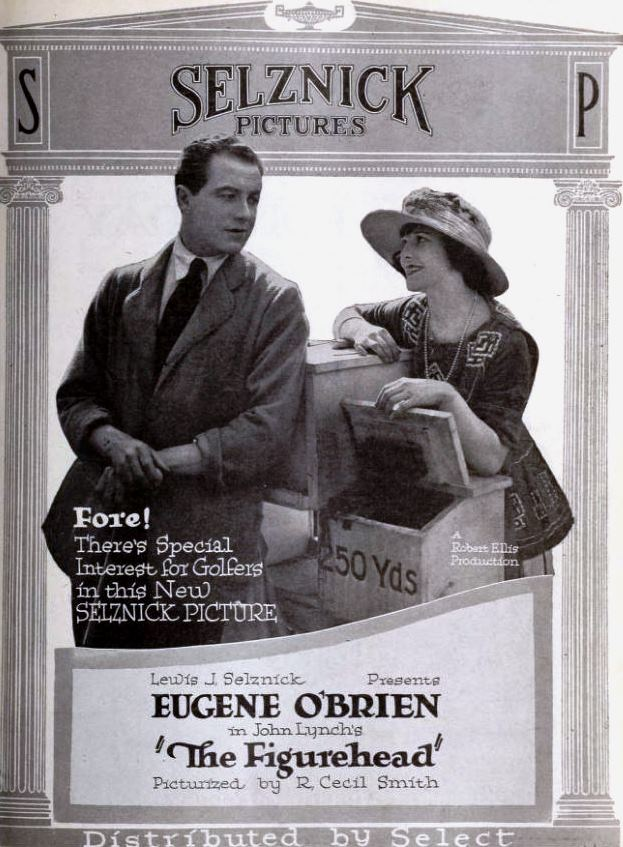
- Directed by: Robert Ellis
- Written by: John Lynch; R. Cecil Smith
- Produced by: Lewis J. Selznick
- Starring: Eugene O'Brien; Anna Q. Nilsson; Ora Carew
- Production company: Selznick Pictures
- Distributed by: Selznick Pictures
- Release date: June 14, 1920
- Running time: 50 minutes
- Country: United States
- Languages: Silent; English intertitles

The Figurehead is a 1920 American silent drama film directed by Robert Ellis and starring Eugene O'Brien, Anna Q. Nilsson and Ora Carew.

== Plot ==
Two political bosses have controlled party politics in the city of Bolton, by installing "figureheads" as mayor. They are surprised when Sheridan Dows, known as "Sherry", a carefree young man they've nominated as a candidate, takes his responsibilities seriously and slowly gains popular support. The political bosses plot to eliminate Sherry from the race by framing him.

== Cast ==
- Eugene O'Brien as Sheridan Dow
- Anna Q. Nilsson as Mary Forbes
- Ora Carew as Sylvia Freeman
- Edwin Stevens as Frank Freeman
- Joseph W. Girard as James Durfee
- Frances Parks as Kitty
- Kate Price as Mrs. Devlin

== Bibliography ==
- Connelly, Robert B. The Silents: Silent Feature Films, 1910-36, Volume 40, Issue 2. December Press, 1998.
- Munden, Kenneth White. The American Film Institute Catalog of Motion Pictures Produced in the United States, Part 1. University of California Press, 1997.
