= Get Your Man (1921 film) =

1921 film

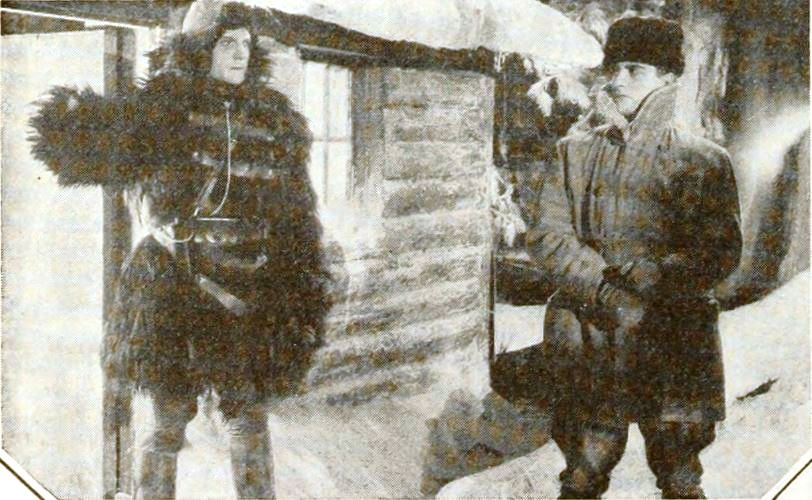
- Directed by: William K. Howard; George Hill
- Written by: John Montague; Alan Sullivan
- Produced by: William Fox; B.P. Schulberg
- Starring: Buck Jones; Beatrice Burnham; Helene Rosson
- Cinematography: Frank B. Good
- Production company: Fox Film Corporation
- Distributed by: Fox Film Corporation
- Release date: May 22, 1921
- Running time: 50 minutes
- Country: United States
- Languages: Silent; English intertitles

Get Your Man is a 1921 American silent drama film directed by George Hill and William K. Howard and starring Buck Jones, Beatrice Burnham and Helene Rosson.

== Cast ==
- Buck Jones as Jock MacTier
- W.E. Lawrence as Arthur Whitman
- Beatrice Burnham as Lenore De Marney
- Helene Rosson as Margaret MacPherson
- Paul Kamp as Joe

== Bibliography ==
- Connelly, Robert B. The Silents: Silent Feature Films, 1910-36, Volume 40, Issue 2. December Press, 1998.
- Munden, Kenneth White. The American Film Institute Catalog of Motion Pictures Produced in the United States, Part 1. University of California Press, 1997.
- Solomon, Aubrey. The Fox Film Corporation, 1915-1935: A History and Filmography. McFarland, 2011.
