= The Great Gamble (film) =

1919 American silent film serial

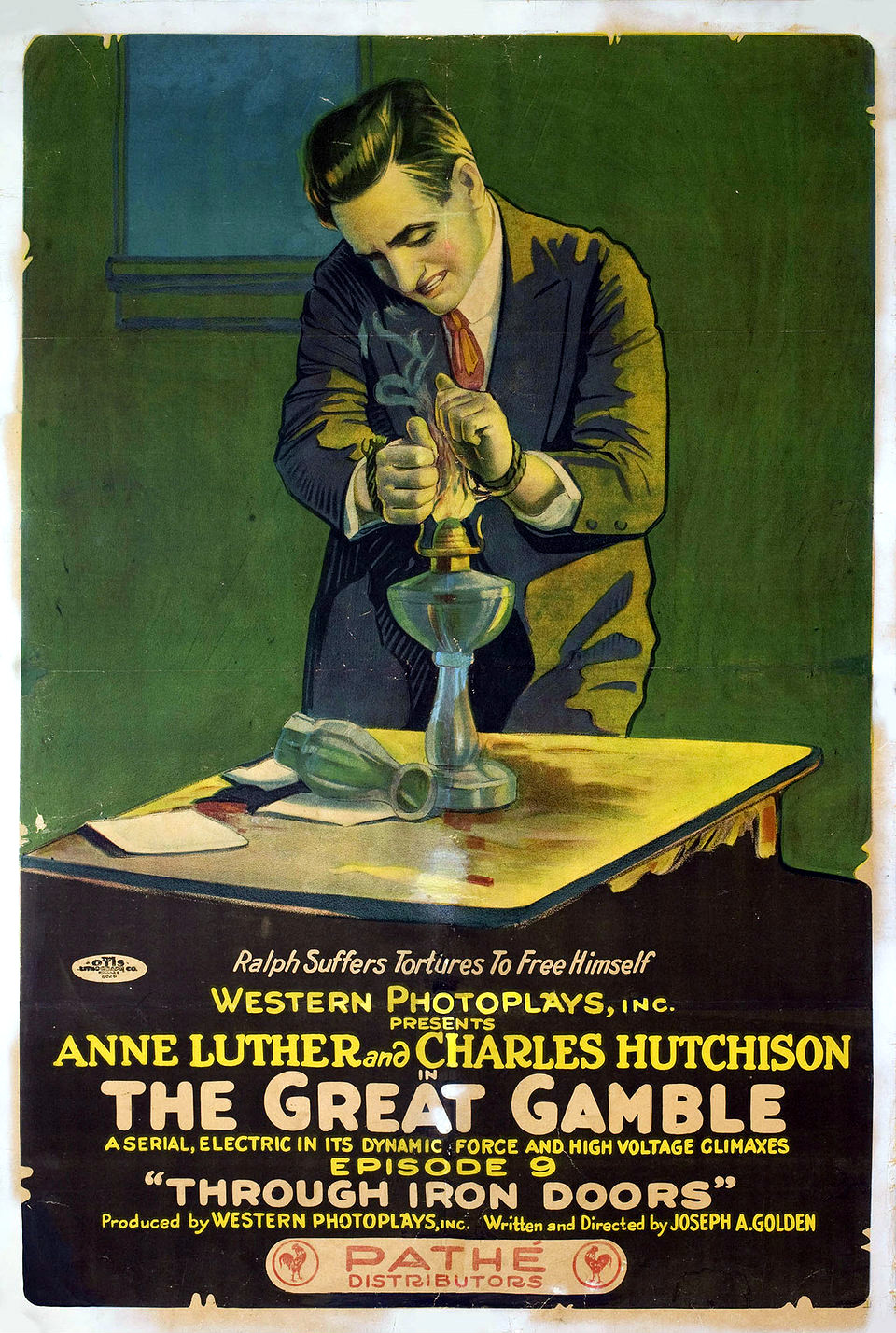
- Theatrical release poster
- Directed by: Joseph A. Golden
- Written by: Joseph A. Golden
- Produced by: Joseph A. Golden
- Starring: Charles Hutchison; Anna Luther; Richard Neill
- Production company: Western Photoplays
- Distributed by: Pathé Exchange
- Release date: August 3, 1919
- Running time: 15 episodes (31 reels)
- Country: United States
- Language: Silent (English intertitles)

The Great Gamble is a 1919 American silent adventure film serial written, directed and produced by Joseph A. Golden. Produced by Western Photoplays and distributed by Pathé Exchange, the fifteen-episode serial starred Charles Hutchison, Anna Luther and Richard Neill.

Pathé released the original 31-reel version in fifteen weekly installments between August 3 and November 9, 1919.

For its 1920 French release as Le Grand Jeu, the serial was abridged to 12 episodes and 24 reels. A still shorter Soviet re-edit survives in two incomplete copies preserved by Gosfilmofond, which the Cineteca del Friuli combined to reconstruct the Soviet version.

== Premise ==
A set of twin girls are separated in early childhood. Aline is raised to become a young lady by her father, Roger Morton. Eleanor is raised by criminal Richard Blake. 18 years later, Blake plans to switch Aline for Eleanor in a bid to gain Morton's fortune.

== Cast ==
- Charles Hutchison as Ralph Darrell
- Anna Luther as Aline Morton and Eleanor “Nell” Morton
- Richard Neill as Richard Blake
- William F. Moran as Shorty “the Rat”
- William Cavanaugh as Cooley
- Warren Cook as Roger Morton
- Edith Thornton as Catherine Morton
- Karl Dane as a sea captain

Laura LaPlante has sometimes been credited with an early appearance in the serial, but the surviving footage does not substantiate the attribution.

== Episodes ==
==== Prologue ====
The wife of wealthy mine owner Roger Morton runs away with the criminal Richard Blake, taking one of their twin daughters, Eleanor, and leaving the other, Aline, with her father. After Catherine Morton is lost when their steamer catches fire, Blake rescues Eleanor and raises her among criminals, while Aline grows up in wealth and refinement. 18 years later, Blake learns that Aline will inherit Morton's fortune. Noting the sisters' physical resemblance, he plans to abduct Aline and substitute Eleanor for her.

==== Episode 1: The Great Gamble ====
18 years later, Blake learns that Aline will inherit Morton's fortune. Noting the sisters' physical resemblance, he plans to abduct Aline and substitute Eleanor for her. To explain why Eleanor won't have the memories of Aline, Eleanor will pretend that the trauma of the abduction has caused amnesia. Ralph Darrell, a successful young businessman, falls for Aline at first sight. Robinson, a man that Nell and Blake swindled, bring the police to Eleanor and Blake's home. The criminals flee to Ralph's house, where Eleanor fakes illness and is taken in by Ralph, who thinks she is Aline. Blake breaks in and steals bonds belonging to Ralph's friend, Harding. When Harding suddenly dies, Ralph is accused of murder. He goes to Aline, thinking she can confirm his alibi, but she cannot.

== Production ==
Following Hutchison's appearance in Joseph A. Golden's Wolves of Kultur (1918), film historian Kalton C. Lahue wrote that the fan mail Hutchison received led Golden to cast him in his next serial.

In March 1919, Western Photoplays general manager A. Alperstein announced that the serial's Far Eastern territorial rights had been sold on the "strength of the producer's reputation." In June, the publicity campaign was launched, announcing a release date of August 3, and boasting of a "comprehensive exploitation campaign."

Hutchison was injured while shooting exterior scenes in Chattanooga, Tennessee. While performing a stunt, he fell head-first onto a rock and sustained a concussion. He required several days of complete rest before filming resumed.

After completing its southern location work, the company stopped in Washington, D.C., for several days and filmed in and around public buildings. The serial also filmed at Ausable Chasm, near Lake Champlain.

Filming was completed by early July. A contemporary report in The Moving Picture World described one of the final scenes, in which Hutchison rode a motorcycle up an embankment, pursued a train and leaped from his motorcycle onto its rear platform.

Golden filmed the interiors at the Crystal–Western Photoplays Studios in the Bronx. Confirmed exterior locations included Umbrella Rock and Lookout Mountain in Tennessee; Miami and the Everglades in Florida; Washington, D.C.; Ausable Chasm and Keeseville in New York; and the since-demolished John H. Matthews House at Riverside Drive and West 90th Street in Manhattan.

Film historian Anthony Slide states that Western Photoplays ceased production before filming was completed and that the Astra Film Corporation finished the serial. Contemporary trade reports, however, continued to identify The Great Gamble as a Western Photoplays production directed by Golden, and the July completion notice credited Golden with completing the photography without mentioning Astra.

== Release and promotion ==
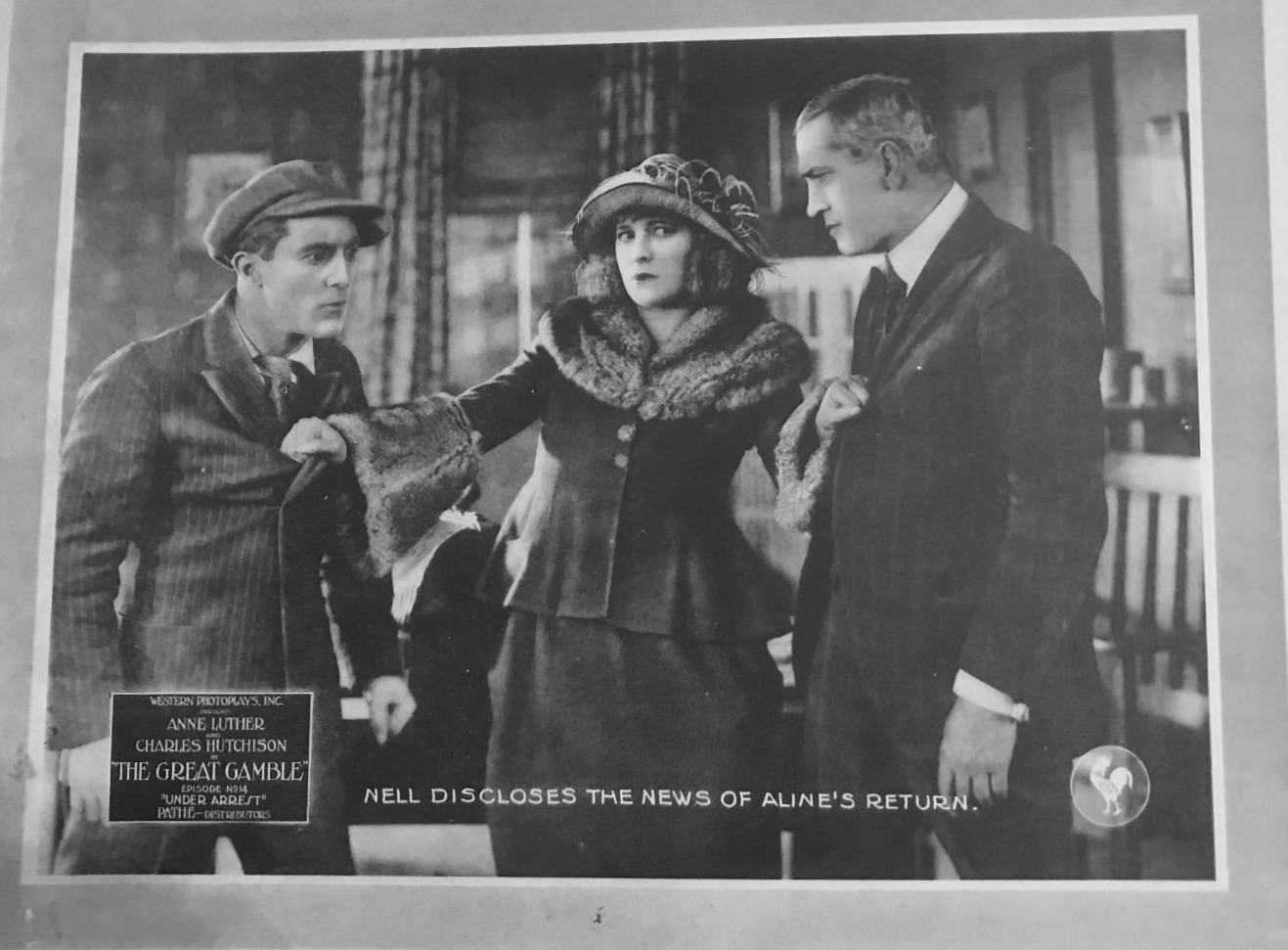
Lobby card for The Great Gamble

24 sheet stand poster design for The Great Gamble.

The first three episodes of The Great Gamble were shown at the New York Theatre Roof on June 20, 1919. Pathé's publicity touted Hutchison's refusal to use a stunt double, as stunts in the serial include jumps between 80ft (24m) high buildings over 14ft (4.3m) gaps, swinging on a rope into a window, diving from 125ft (38m) into water, riding a horse across fallen tree across a chasm, and jumping to the cowcatcher of a fast-moving train.

The Great Gamble was positioned by Pathé as the first release in a program of seven serials extending through January 1921. It promoted the production as a “tense gripping story of crook life” and advertised it as “The Greatest Stunt Serial Ever Produced”. The distributor supplied exhibitors with a 36-page campaign book containing illustrated episode summaries, advertising suggestions, reproducible cuts and advertisements that could be adapted to local conditions. Its cover reproduced the serial's 24-sheet poster, which Pathé planned to display nationally on billboards at its own expense. The 24 sheet stand poster used by Pathé was designed by Frederick Brown McDann, depicting one of Hutchison's stunts and adverting the serial as "electric in its dynamic force and high voltage climaxes."

In 1923, Western Photoplays stockholders sued Pathé Exchange over money allegedly still due from the serial's 1919 exhibition. The court ruled in Pathé's favor. The following year, Clarion Photoplays, part of the Weiss Brothers–Artclass organization, released five five-reel features described as revisions of The Great Gamble and Golden's earlier serial, Wolves of Kultur: Ten After Ten, The Law Demands, The Fatal Plunge, The Radio Flyer and Fangs of the Wolf.

== Reception ==
Reviewing the first seven reels for The Moving Picture World, C. S. Sewell wrote that the serial's abundant thrills and stunts should satisfy audiences who enjoyed the form, although he considered its story conventional and exaggerated. He praised Hutchison's personality and agility, Luther's performance in the dual role and the supporting cast, while describing Neill as a "typical serial villain." Sewell observed that the three-reel opening installment largely established the story, after which the action accelerated through the second and third episodes.

Exhibitors Herald recorded positive reactions, as well. In the January 17th issue, Albert G. Gilruth of the Foto Pla [sic] Theatre in Watertown, South Dakota called it, "The best serial you can buy." In the March 6th issue, W. C. Cleeton of the Gem Theatre in Higbee, Missouri, said that the serial was becoming stronger by its fourth episode. Stephen Arnott of the Colonial Theatre in Bruceville, Indiana, called it one of Pathé's best serials, compared its popularity favorably with The Neglected Wife, and recommended it to other exhibitors.

The French magazine Le Courrier Cinématographique gave a similarly favorable assessment in to the serial, retitled "Le Grand Jeu" (The Great Game). Reviewing the first episode, the magazine's critic praised the performances and highlighted the writing of the intertitles.

In 1968, Kalton C. Lahue wrote that the serial's main flaw was the difficulty of telling which twin Anne Luther was playing as certain times, and how this made her characters' motives unclear.

== Episodes ==
American release schedule
No.	Title	Release date
1	The Great Gamble	August 3, 1919
2	The Clock of Doom	August 10, 1919
3	Into the Chasm	August 17, 1919
4	In the Law's Grip	August 24, 1919
5	Draught of Death	August 31, 1919
6	Out of the Clouds	September 7, 1919
7	The Crawling Menace	September 14, 1919
8	The Ring of Fire	September 21, 1919
9	Through Iron Doors	September 28, 1919
10	Written in Blood (Note: Also reported as The Abduction.)	October 5, 1919
11	The Stolen Identity	October 12, 1919
12	The Wolf Pack	October 19, 1919
13	Barriers of Flame	October 26, 1919
14	Under Arrest	November 2, 1919
15	Out of the Shadows	November 9, 1919

== Preservation and reconstruction ==
The complete fifteen-episode American version is not known to survive. An inquiry through the International Federation of Film Archives identified two incomplete safety copies at Gosfilmofond in Moscow. The archive held the 19- and 22-reel copies under the titles Dvoynoye priklyucheniye and Bol'shaya igra, respectively. Researchers identified Dvoynoye priklyucheniye as a version of The Great Gamble in January 2016 and determined the following year that Bol'shaya igra represented another version of the same serial.

Both copies derive from the abridged French edition, which Soviet distributors further reorganized into a three-part version released in 1927 as Kleimo prestuplenia (“The Stigma of Crime”). The Soviet adaptation changed the protagonists from wealthy businessmen into writers and recast the criminals as would-be literary thieves. Its editors removed scenes involving mine workers and made other changes that introduced inconsistencies into the plot.

Gosfilmofond made the safety copies during the 1970s from nitrate elements that were later destroyed. Similar patterns of wear suggest that both copies probably derived from the same nitrate positive. Bol'shaya igra preserved a cleaner image but contained shortened or missing intertitles; the more worn Dvoynoye priklyucheniye retained more complete titles.

The Cineteca del Friuli scanned Bol'shaya igra in 2K and supplemented it with footage and intertitles from Dvoynoye priklyucheniye. To reconstruct the narrative and restore some titles, the archive consulted Soviet censorship records, fictionalized newspaper summaries of the episodes published in Vermont's The Caledonian-Record, and Téramond's French novelization.

The reconstruction retains the Soviet arrangement rather than attempting to recreate the original American continuity. The restorers moved the surviving portion of the prologue to the end as a flashback and reordered several other sequences. Most of the prologue, a sequence involving Seminole people and the entire epilogue remain missing. Presented with Russian intertitles, the reconstruction runs approximately 320 minutes at 15 frames per second.
