= The Mystic Hour =

1933 film

- Directed by: Melville De Lay
- Written by: Jack Natteford; Susan Embry
- Produced by: Bernard B. Ray
- Starring: Charles Hutchison; Lucille Powers; Montagu Love
- Cinematography: Leon Shamroy
- Edited by: Otis Garrett
- Production company: Reliable Pictures
- Distributed by: Progressive Pictures
- Release date: May 28, 1933
- Running time: 60 minutes
- Country: United States
- Language: English

The Mystic Hour is a 1933 American mystery film directed by Melville De Lay and starring Charles Hutchison, Lucille Powers and Montagu Love. It is also known by the alternative title of At Twelve Midnight. The film was one of the earliest releases of the Poverty Row studio Reliable Pictures.

== Plot ==
The Fox is a famous burglar who masquerades as a private investigator.

== Cast ==
- Charles Hutchison as Robert Randall
- Lucille Powers as Mary Marshall
- Montagu Love as Captain James alias The Fox
- Charles Middleton as Roger Thurston
- Edith Thornton as Myra Marshall
- Eddie Phillips as Bradley Thurston
- Jimmy Aubrey as Blinkey
