= Fair Play (1925 film) =

1925 film

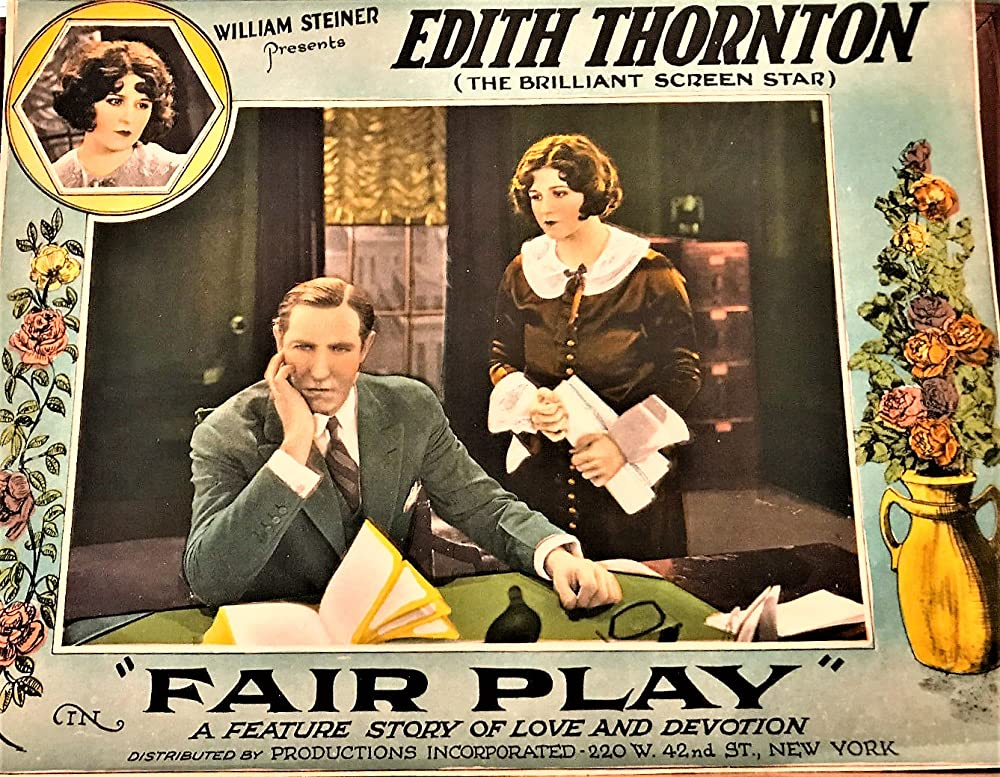
- Directed by: Frank Hall Crane
- Written by: Jack Natteford
- Produced by: Charles Hutchison
- Starring: Edith Thornton; Lou Tellegen; Gaston Glass
- Cinematography: Ernest Miller
- Production company: William Steiner Productions
- Distributed by: Productions Incorporated; Wardour Films (UK)
- Release dates: February 1925; March 1, 1926 (UK)
- Running time: 50 minutes
- Country: United States
- Languages: Silent; English intertitles

Fair Play is a 1925 American silent drama film directed by Frank Hall Crane and starring Edith Thornton, Lou Tellegen and Gaston Glass.

== Synopsis ==
The career of criminal lawyer Bruce Elliot is largely built up by his devoted secretary, Norma Keith. However unaware of her feelings for him, he marries a gold-digging woman. When she is then killed in an accident, Bruce is convicted of murder and it falls to Norma to scour the criminal underworld for evidence that will clear him.

== Cast ==
- Edith Thornton as Norma Keith
- Lou Tellegen as Bruce Elliot
- Gaston Glass as Dickie Thane
- Betty Francisco as Rita Thane
- David Dunbar as Bull Mong
- Simon Greer as Charlie Morse

== Bibliography ==
- Munden, Kenneth White. The American Film Institute Catalog of Motion Pictures Produced in the United States, Part 1. University of California Press, 1997.
