= Was It Bigamy? =

1925 film

- Directed by: Charles Hutchison
- Written by: Jack Natteford; Forrest Sheldon
- Produced by: William Steiner
- Starring: Edith Thornton; Earle Williams; Wilfred Lucas
- Cinematography: Ernest Miller
- Production company: William Steiner Productions
- Distributed by: Productions, Inc.
- Release date: September 27, 1925
- Running time: 50 minutes
- Country: United States
- Languages: Silent; English intertitles

Was It Bigamy? is a 1925 American silent drama film directed by Charles Hutchison and starring Edith Thornton, Earle Williams and Wilfred Lucas.

== Synopsis ==
A woman marries twice, once for love and once for financial security to help out a relative. Technically she has committed bigamy, but questions remain how morally responsible she is for this illegal act.

== Cast ==
- Edith Thornton as Ruth Steele
- Earle Williams as Carleton
- Tom Ricketts as Judge Gaynor
- Charles Cruz as Harvey Gaynor
- Wilfred Lucas as Attorney

== Bibliography ==
- Connelly, Robert B. The Silents: Silent Feature Films, 1910-36, Volume 40, Issue 2. December Press, 1998.
- Munden, Kenneth White. The American Film Institute Catalog of Motion Pictures Produced in the United States, Part 1. University of California Press, 1997.
