= Frederic Chapin =

American screenwriter and composer

Frederic Chapin (December 1, 1873 – December 27, 1947) was an American screenwriter and composer. His name was also written as Frederick Chapin. He wrote the scores for several Broadway musicals. In addition he worked writing screenplays during the silent and early sound eras.

== Biography ==
Chapin was born in Cleveland, Ohio in 1873. His popular work The Storks (1902) with Guy F. Steeley led to his work with L. Frank Baum, as he was recommended by M. Witmark & Sons, the publisher. Chapin is best known for his work with Baum on The Woggle-Bug, a 1905 musical based on Baum's novel, The Marvelous Land of Oz. He also wrote songs with lyricist Arthur Gillespie, two of which appeared, credited to Baum, in The Woggle-Bug.

His other stage works include Pussy in a Corner (1904), The Forbidden Land (1904), The American Girl (1906), and The Maid and the Millionaire (1907). Chapin took up writing, and wrote the book and lyrics for The Maid and the Millionaire, and then produced a 1908 fantasy novel modeled on the Oz books titled Toodles of Treasure Town and her Snow Man, which he followed with Pinkey and the Plumed Knight (1909), both illustrated by Merle De Vore Johnson.

On November 11, 1912, he opened a four-act farce called C.O.D. on Broadway at the Gaiety Theatre, which was fairly successful, in spite of many negative reviews such that one reviewer felt the need to quote reviews from The Sun and others, while The New York Times found the play funny and well acted.

The day before the play opened, he told The Detroit New Tribune, "I wrote six plays--every one turned out to have a great theme, but all were faulty in the way it was developed." He claims to have completely rewritten C.O.D. prior to its production, claiming he threw the original script in the garbage and started from scratch after the fourth producer finally accepted it. Tefft Johnson directed a film version of C.O.D. in 1914 with Harry Davenport, Hughie Mack, and Charles Brown in the title roles (men with the initials, C.O.D.).

=== Scenarist ===
From 1914 to 1932, Chapin worked as a scenarist in Hollywood. His work included The Woman in 47.

=== Return to composing ===
Chapin returned to composing with Unashamed, a 1938 nudist romance. He also appeared as a film stand-in, for which he use the name "Fred Fuller." According to the Internet Movie Database, "Fuller" played "Younger Dolittle" in Made for Each Other and was a stand-in and had an undetermined role in Bachelor Mother.

== Family ==
His son, James Chapin, became a director, but died in 1924 after making only six films. His daughter, Margery Chapin, was married to William A. Wellman from 1925 to 1926 (the second of his four wives), and had a cameo role in Wings that was also seen in The Celluloid Closet. William and Margery adopted a daughter, Gloria, who was the natural daughter of screenwriter Robert Emmett Tansey.

Chapin died in Los Angeles, California, in 1947.

== Selected filmography ==
- C.O.D. (1914)
- The Woman in 47 (1916)
- The Ragged Princess (1916)
- The House of Mirrors (1916)
- The Argyle Case (1917)
- The Empress (1917)
- The Easiest Way (1917)
- The Peddler (1917)
- The Antics of Ann (1917)
- The Turn of a Card (1918)
- Heart of the Sunset (1918)
- The Marionettes (1918)
- Ravished Armenia (1919)
- Daredevil Jack (1920)
- The Lost City (1920)
- Against All Odds (1924)
- Virtue's Revolt (1924)
- Gold Heels (1924)
- Turned Up (1924)
- The Prince of Broadway (1926)
- The Little Firebrand (1926)
- Hour of Reckoning (1926)
- The Trunk Mystery (1926)
- The Night Bride (1927)
- Soft Cushions (1927)
- Mark of the Spur (1932)
- Out of Singapore (1932)

== Bibliography ==
- Bordman, Gerald. American Musical Theater: A Chronicle. Oxford University Press, 2001.
- Erish, Andrew A. Col. William N. Selig, the Man Who Invented Hollywood. University of Texas Press, 2012.
