= The Better Woman =

The Better Woman may refer to:

- The Better Woman (film), a 1915 American silent film
- The Better Woman (TV series), a 2019 Philippine television drama series
