= Virtue's Revolt =

1924 film

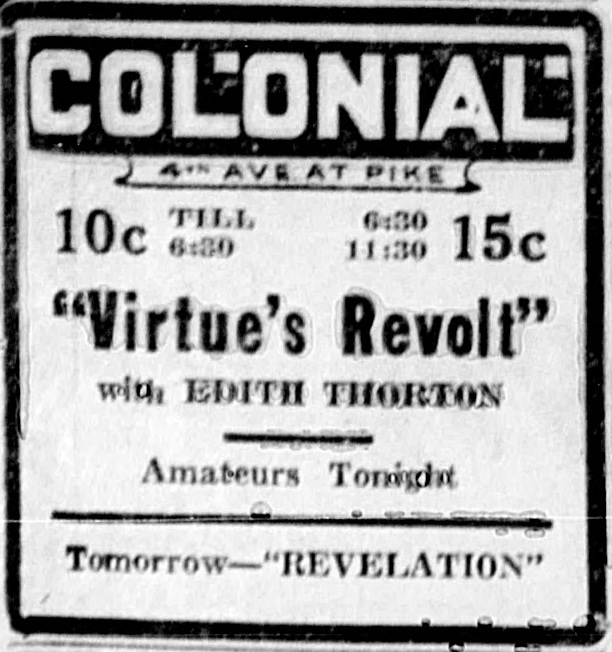
- Contemporary advertisement
- Directed by: James Chapin
- Written by: Frederic Chapin
- Produced by: William Steiner
- Starring: Edith Thornton; Crauford Kent; Betty Morrissey
- Cinematography: Ernest Miller
- Production company: William Steiner Productions
- Distributed by: William Steiner Productions; Wardour Films (UK)
- Release date: October 11, 1924
- Running time: 60 minutes
- Country: United States
- Languages: Silent; English intertitles

Virtue's Revolt is a 1924 American silent drama film directed by James Chapin and starring Edith Thornton, Crauford Kent and Betty Morrissey.

== Synopsis ==
An ambitious young actress comes to New York City but finds that she can only secure a career by becoming the lover of a theatre manager. Refusing at first, she falls in love with another man, before striking a bargain that launches her on the Broadway stage.

== Cast ==
- Edith Thornton as Streisa Cane
- Crauford Kent as Bertram Winthrope
- Betty Morrissey as Ruth Cane
- Charles Cruz as Tom Powers
- Florence Lee as Mrs. Cane
- Eddie Phillips as Elton Marbridge
- Melbourne MacDowell as Family Lawyer
- Niles Welch as Steve Marbridge

== Bibliography ==
- Munden, Kenneth White. The American Film Institute Catalog of Motion Pictures Produced in the United States, Part 1. University of California Press, 1997.
