= William Steiner Productions =

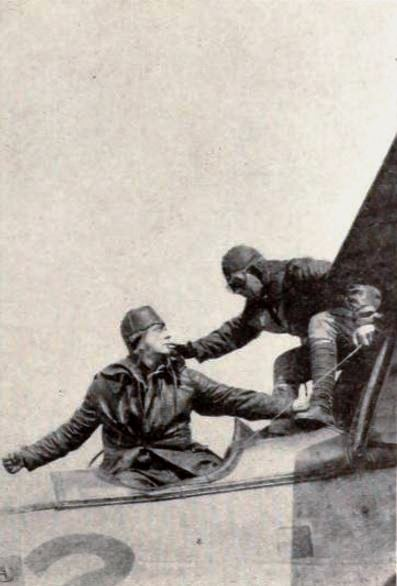
Still from Sky Eye

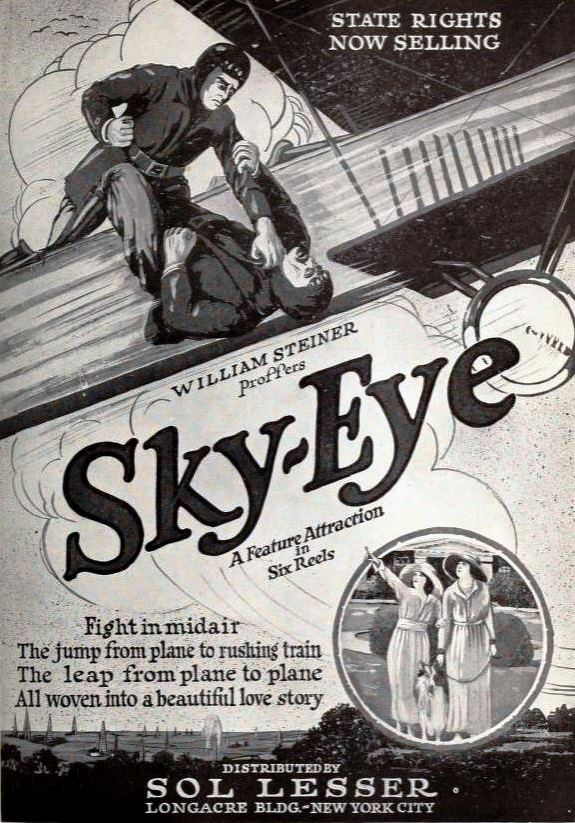
Advertisement for Sky Eye

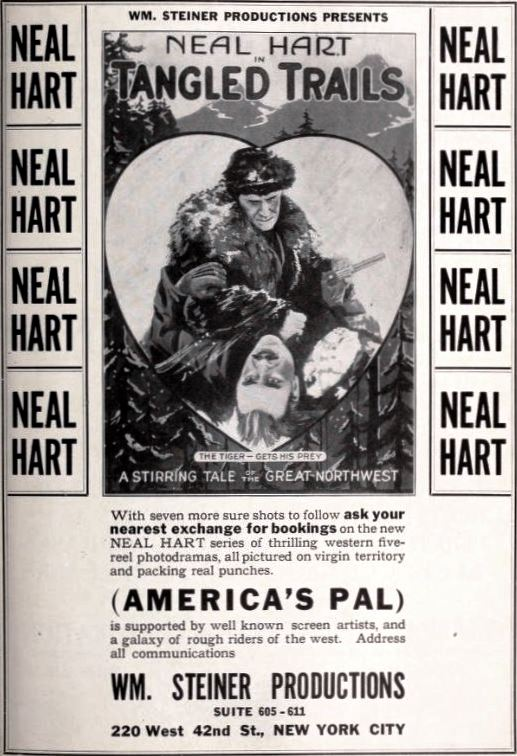
Tangled Trails advertisement

William Steiner Productions was a film company in the United States led by William Steiner. The company shot westerns. Based in New York, it operated in New Jersey, Texas and Hollywood, California.

Steiner also started Jester Comedy Company that made comedy films in New Jersey. Both of Steiner's film company's filmed at a studio in Cliffside Park, New Jersey. Jester filmed two-reel comedies. William A. Seiter directed films for Jester.

William Steiner Productions was one of the film companies sued for use of a camera type.

== Filmography ==
=== Prior to William Steiner Productions ===
- Prohibition (1915)
- The Yellow Menace (1916)
- The Recruit, Jester's first comedy

=== William Steiner Productions ===
- The Masked Rider (1919 film)
- The Love of Gold (1922)
- The Heart of a Texan (1922)
- The Forbidden Range (1923)

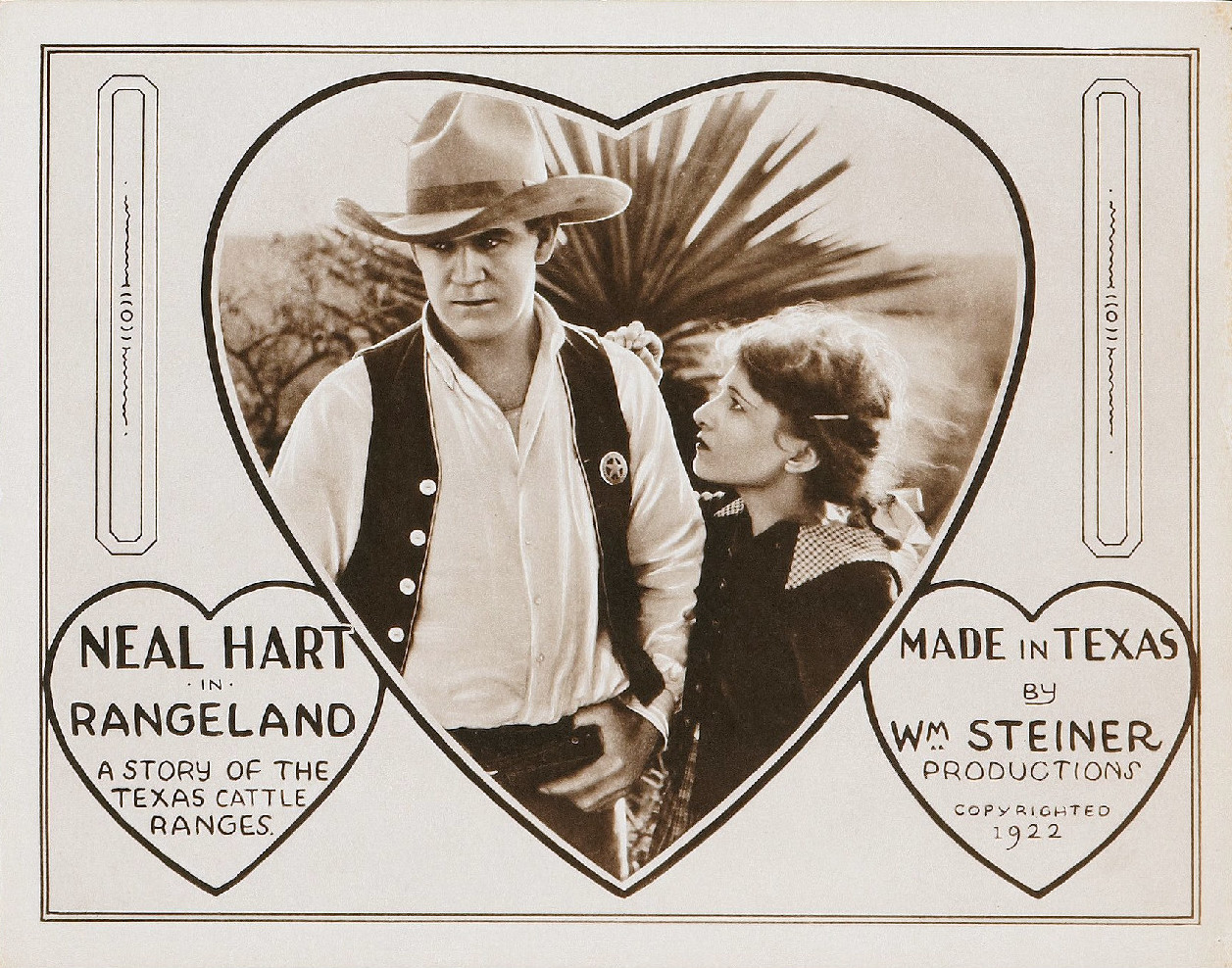
Rangeland lobby card

- Branded a Thief (1924)
- The Heart of a Texan (1924)
- Surging Seas (1924)
- Headin' Through (1924) starring Leo Maloney, "A Thrilling Story of the Ranch", length 4,700 Feet in Five parts
- The Hidden Menace (1925)
- Table Top Ranch
- West of the Picos
- The Secret of the Pueblo
- Virtue's Revolt (1924)
- Turned Up (film) (1924)
- On Probation (1924 film)
- Fair Play (1925 film)
- Was It Bigamy? (1925)
