= C.O.D. (1914 film) =

1914 short film directed by Tefft Johnson

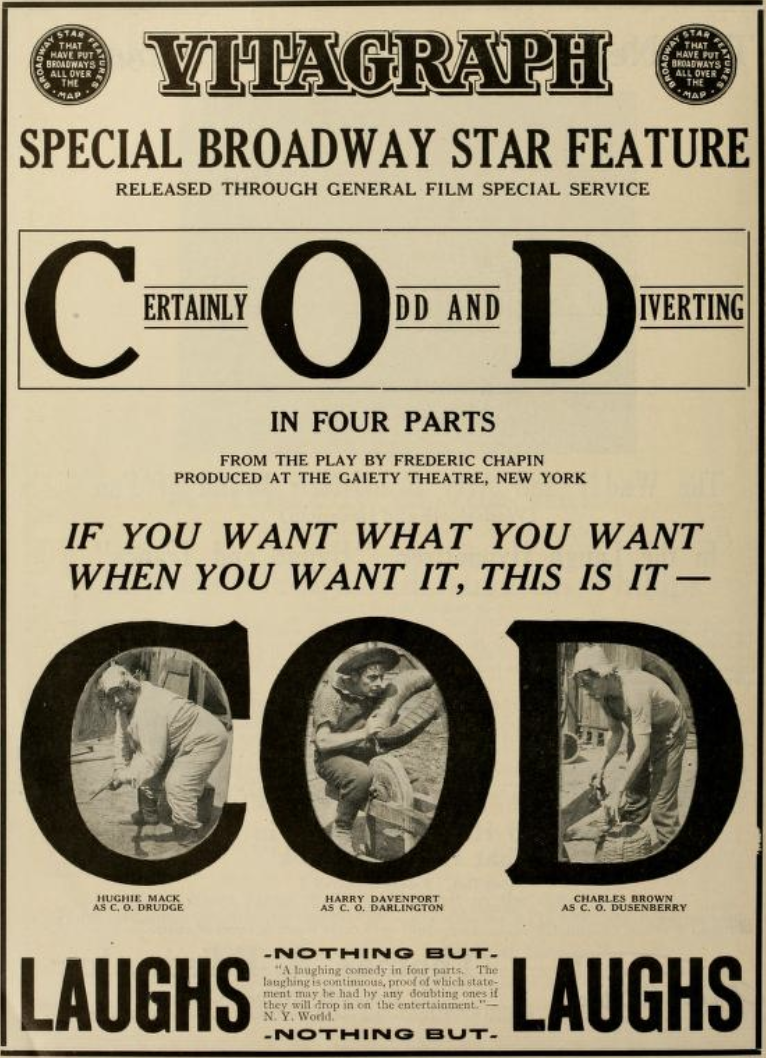
- advertisement in Moving Picture World, 1915
- Directed by: Tefft Johnson
- Written by: Charles Brown
- Based on: C.O.D. (play) by Frederic Chapin
- Starring: Harry Davenport; Hughie Mack; Charles Brown; Eulalie Jensen; Mabel Kelly; Edwina Robbins
- Production company: Vitagraph Studios
- Distributed by: General Film Company
- Release date: December 6, 1914
- Running time: 4 reels
- Country: United States
- Languages: Silent; English intertitles

C.O.D. is a 1914 short comedy film directed by Tefft Johnson and based upon Frederic Chapin's 1912 play of the same name.

== Plot ==
C.O. Darlington (Harry Davenport), C.O. Drudge (Hughie Mack) and C.O. Dusenberry (Charles Brown) each feign an illness to their wives and instead go on vacation together. After their train crashes, they are mistaken as convicts and put to work by Farmer Jones (William Shea). However, once their true identities are revealed, they are entertained by Farmer Jones and his daughters.

Meanwhile, the wives (Eulalie Jensen, Mabel Kelly, Edwina Robbins) discover that their husbands went on vacation and decide to take their own vacation together. They meet three other men, who take them to dinner at Farmer Jones' house. The husbands are forced to hide and eventually escape to the barn. The next morning, the husbands and wives concoct explanations before returning to the city.

== Cast ==
- Harry Davenport as C.O. Darlington
- Hughie Mack as C.O. Drudge
- Charles Brown as C.O. Dusenberry
- Eulalie Jensen as Mrs. Darlington
- Mabel Kelly as Mrs. Drudge
- Edwina Robbins as Mrs. Dusenberry
- Jack Bulger as Willie Willing
- William R. Dunn as Wallie Walton
- Stephen Lennon as Wilton Wallford
- William Shea as Farmer Jones
- Minnie Storey as Mrs. Jones
- Ethel Corcoran as Iwilla Jones
- Mary Anderson as Irva Jones
- Ruth Edwards as Irma Jones
- Charles Edwards as Lem

== Release ==
The film premiered in New York at the Vitagraph Theater on December 6, 1914, alongside a one-act play entitled What the Moon Saw, which was written by Vitagraph actor S. Rankin Drew.

== Reception ==
C.O.D. was described as "high-class comedy" in a positive review in Moving Picture World. A review in Motion Picture News stated that the film "comes nearer being the acme of comedy productions than any previous screen story."
