= A Woman's Faith =

1925 film

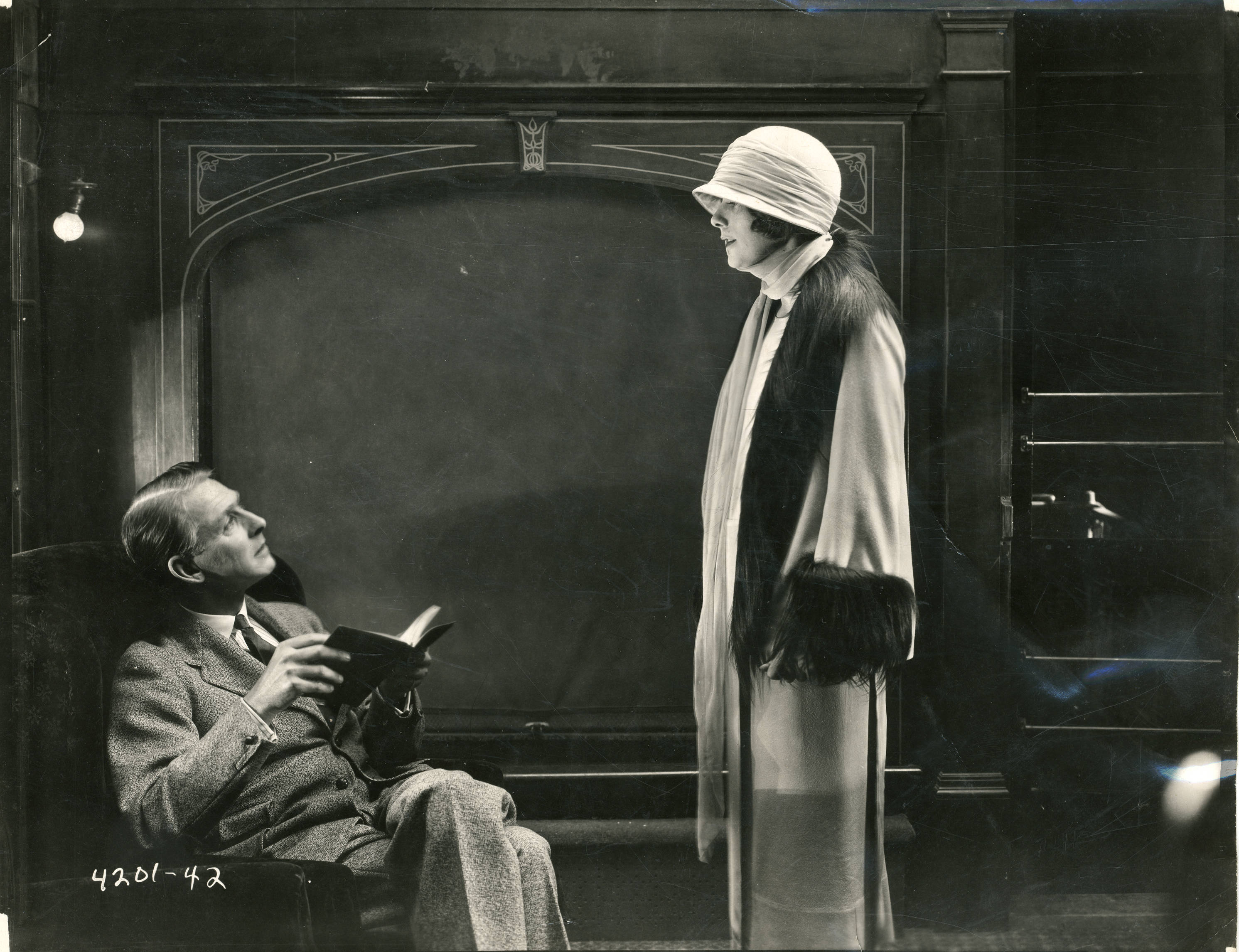
- Still with Marmont and Rubens
- Directed by: Edward Laemmle
- Screenplay by: Edward T. Lowe Jr. C.R. Wallace
- Based on: Miracle by Clarence Budington Kelland
- Starring: Alma Rubens; Percy Marmont; Jean Hersholt; ZaSu Pitts; Hughie Mack; Cesare Gravina
- Cinematography: John Stumar
- Production company: Universal Pictures
- Distributed by: Universal Pictures
- Release date: August 9, 1925
- Running time: 70 minutes
- Country: United States
- Language: Silent (English intertitles)

A Woman's Faith is a 1925 American silent drama film directed by Edward Laemmle and written by Edward T. Lowe Jr. and C.R. Wallace. It is based on the 1925 novel Miracle by Clarence Budington Kelland. The film stars Alma Rubens, Percy Marmont, Jean Hersholt, ZaSu Pitts, Hughie Mack, and Cesare Gravina. The film was released on August 9, 1925, by Universal Pictures.

== Plot ==
As described in a film magazine, Donovan Steele (Marmont), returned to Quebec to get married, finds his fiancée in the arms of another. Deceived by his fiancé, He disappears into the heart of the Canadian wilderness to wander and soon becomes known as "the man who denies god". He is recognized by Leandre Turcot (Beranger), whom he once had saved in a log jam. Turcot insists that Steele stay with him at the home of his aged parents. Here Steele encounters Nerée Caron (Rubens), Turcot's cousin. The young woman is a fugitive from justice, being accused by her uncle, Xavier Caron (Turner), of murdering her brother. Xavier comes to the remote village with a private detective. Although Steele feels that he hates all women, he consents to protect her. Nerée flees to a deserted house, many miles away. Jean Cluny (Hersholt), the detective, gets wind of where she is, and sends word to her that, if she will consent to be his wife, he will help to clear her of the murder charge. She refuses his offer. Steele hears that she is alone, and suspecting that she might be in danger, he dashes away to see her. Soon after he arrives Cluny pounds his way in. A driving storm is raging as he enters. The men glare at each other, then battle it out. The lamp is overturned, and in their blind fury Cluny is knocked out, while Steele is struck between the eyes and blinded. Young Turcot, Nerée, and Turcot's fiancé care for him. At length Nerée induces him to visit the famous shrine at Sainte-Anne-de-Beaupré. While he is yet scoffing on the Holy Stairs, his sight returns. He and Nerée go from the chapel into the arms of two detectives who have been waiting for Neree to tell her that Xavier has confessed to the murder. Steele realizes that there is one woman whom he does not hate. Freed of all charges, Nerée marries Donovan and their wedding is celebrated in the chapel.

== Cast ==
- Alma Rubens as Nerée Caron
- Percy Marmont as Donovan Steele
- Jean Hersholt as Jules Cluny
- ZaSu Pitts as Blanche Odile
- Hughie Mack as François
- Cesare Gravina as Odillon Turcott
- William H. Turner as Xavier Caron
- George Beranger as Leandre Turcott
- Rosa Rosanova as Delima Turcott

== Preservation ==
A print of A Woman's Faith is listed as being in a private collection.
