= Pirates of the Sky =

1926 film

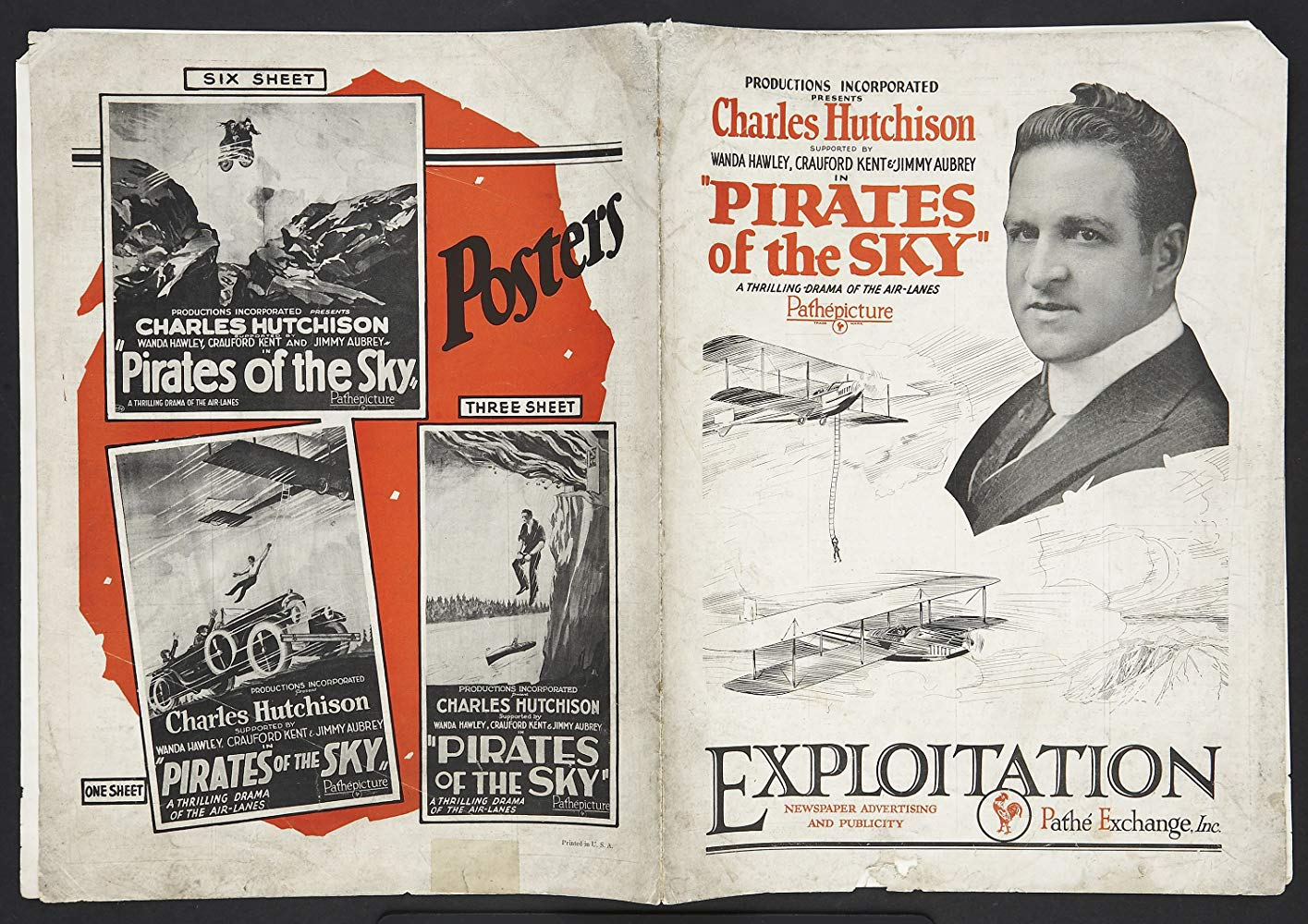
- Film poster
- Directed by: Charles Andrews
- Written by: Elaine Wilmont (story, scenario)
- Produced by: William Steiner
- Starring: Charles Hutchison; Wanda Hawley; Crauford Kent
- Cinematography: Leon Shamroy
- Production company: William Steiner Productions (as Hurricane Film Corporation)
- Distributed by: Pathé Exchange
- Release date: February 20, 1926
- Running time: 65 minutes
- Country: United States
- Languages: Silent; English intertitles

Pirates of the Sky is a 1926 American silent adventure melodrama film directed by Charles Andrews. The film stars Charles Hutchison, Wanda Hawley and Crauford Kent. In different sources, Pirates of the Sky distributed by Pathé Exchange has conflicting release dates of February 20, 1926 and March 21, 1927. (Note: Film historian Michael Paris in From the Wright Brothers to Top Gun: Aviation, Nationalism, and Popular Cinema (1995) noted that Pirates of the Sky was one of a number of films that were characterized as 'up-to-date' westerns.)

== Plot ==
Baffled by the mysterious disappearance of a mail plane, the United States Secret Service solicits the aid of Bob Manning (Charles Hutchison), an amateur criminologist. Among the reporters covering the story is Doris Reed (Wanda Hawley), who has previously been engaged to Manning.

Doris watches Manning's house, but Joe Parker and "Slim," two of Bruce Mitchell's gang, are also watching the house. The gang is responsible for the aircraft's disappearance.

Manning goes to her rescue, and both Doris and Manning are captured and taken to a deserted warehouse. Doris convinces gang leader Bruce Mitchell (Crauford Kent) she is working with the criminals.

Manning escapes, however, and with the help of Doris, thwarts the bandits in some daring aerial work. The couple then are happily reunited.

== Cast ==
- Charles Hutchison as Bob Manning
- Wanda Hawley as Doris Reed
- Crauford Kent as Bruce Mitchell
- Jimmy Aubrey as Jeff Oldring
- Ben Walker as Stone

== Production ==
Male lead Charles Hutchison was known as "Hurricane Hutch", the name of the character he played in three productions.

== Reception ==
Film historian Hugh H. Wynne in The Motion Picture Stunt Pilots and Hollywood's Classic Aviation Movies (1987) noted that Pirates of the Sky was one of a large group of 1920s and 1930s films where aviation was incidental to the plot, even if the title suggested otherwise.

Pirates of the Sky had an exciting "a repertoire of truly awe-inspiring flying stunts, (where) Manning beats the villains at their own game. Wanda Hawley, a former Cecil B. DeMille leading lady who spent the twilight of her career in inexpensive programmers of this nature, is the fetching heroine, while comic relief is supplied by British music-hall veteran Jimmy Aubrey.

In aviation film historian Stephen Pendo's landmark, Aviation in the Cinema (1985), Pirates of the Sky was not very exciting fare.
