= Marquis Preferred =

1929 film

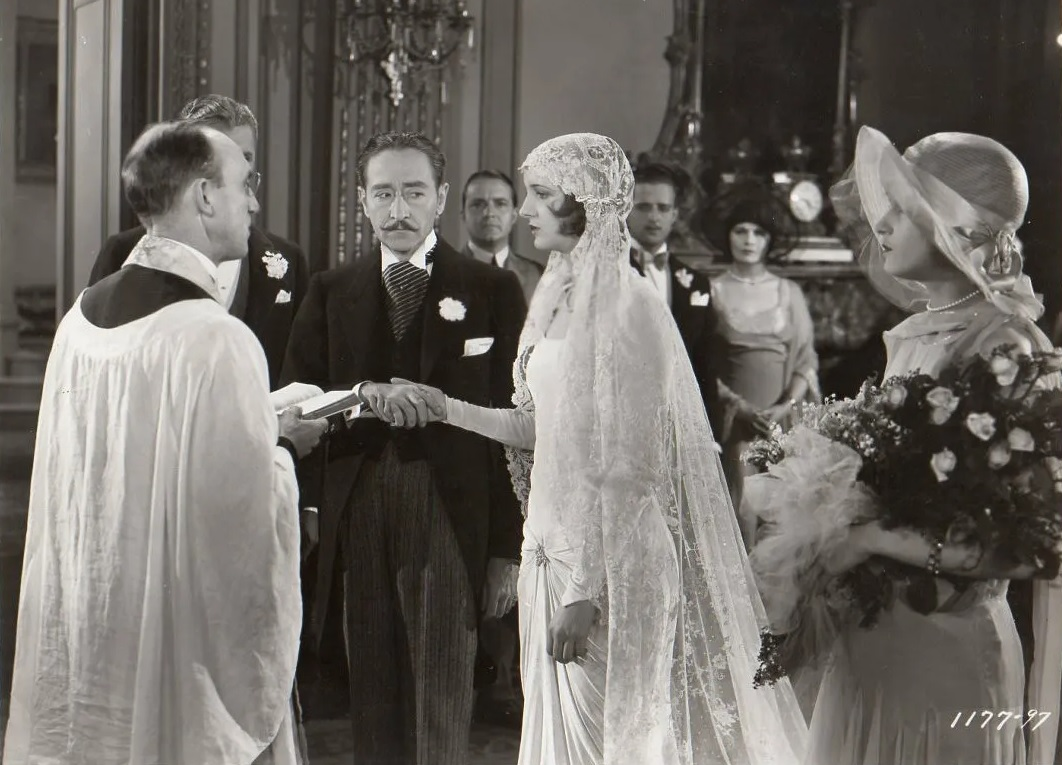
- Still with Menjou and Lane
- Directed by: Frank Tuttle
- Written by: Frederick Arnold Kummer (story); Ernest Vajda (story); Ethel Doherty (writer)
- Produced by: Frank Tuttle
- Starring: Adolphe Menjou
- Cinematography: Harry Fischbeck
- Distributed by: Paramount Pictures
- Release date: January 27, 1929
- Running time: 60 minutes
- Country: United States
- Language: Silent (English intertitles)

Marquis Preferred is a 1929 American silent comedy film directed by Frank Tuttle and starring Adolphe Menjou. It was produced and distributed by Paramount Pictures.

== Cast ==
- Adolphe Menjou as Marquis d'Argenville
- Nora Lane as Peggy Winton
- Chester Conklin as Mr. Gruger
- Dot Farley as Mrs. Gruger (credited as Dorothy Farley)
- Lucille Powers as Gwendolyn Gruger
- Mischa Auer as Albert
- Alex Melesh as Floret
- Michael Visaroff as Jacques
