= The Count of Monte Cristo (1913 film) =

1913 film by Edwin S. Porter and Joseph A. Golden

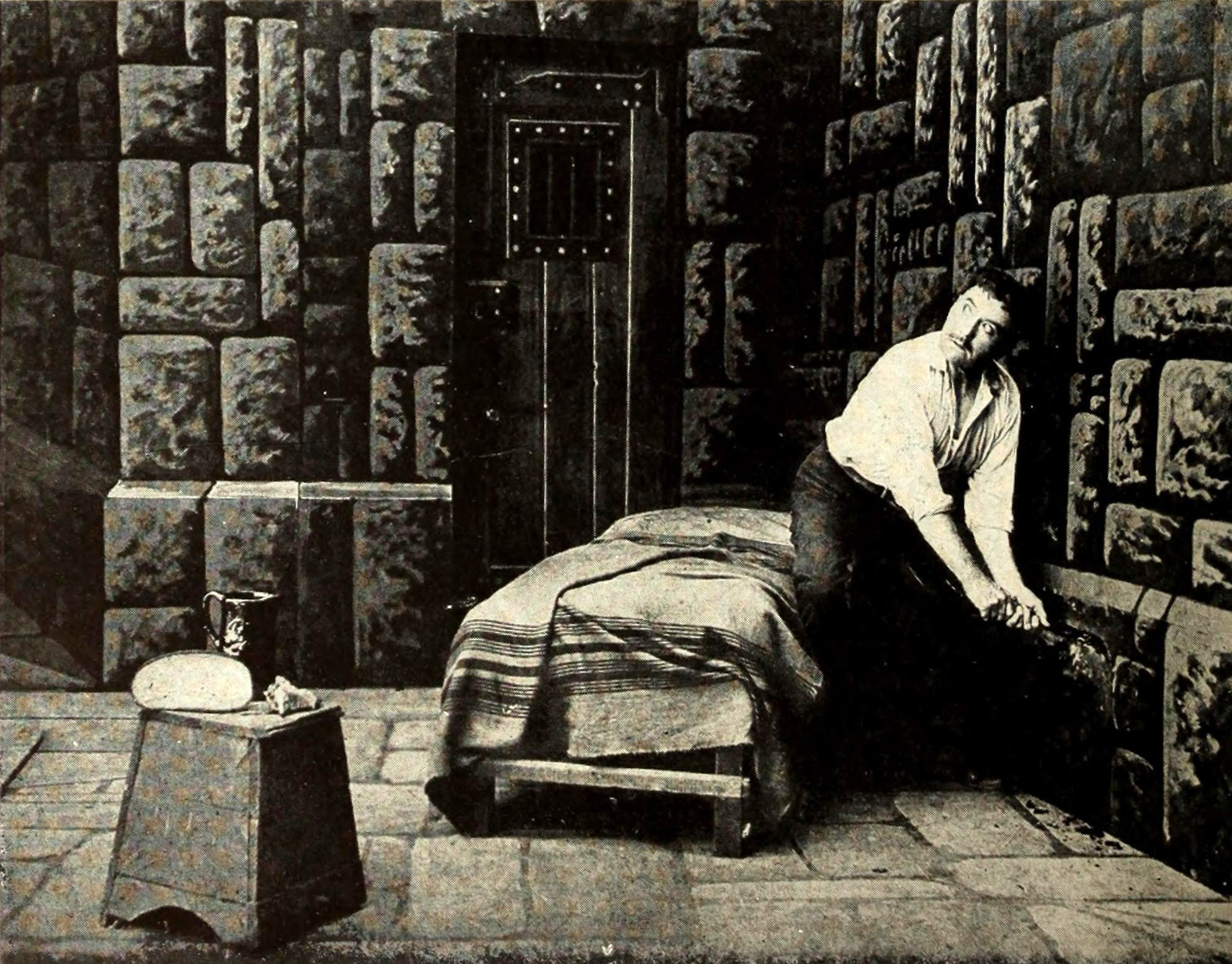
- Still of scene in the film
- Directed by: Joseph A. Golden; Edwin S. Porter
- Written by: Hampton Del Ruth
- Based on: the play, Le Comte de Monte Cristo by Charles Fechter; adapted from the novel Le Comte de Monte Cristo by Alexandre Dumas (pere)
- Produced by: Daniel Frohman; Adolph Zukor
- Starring: James O'Neill; Nance O'Neil
- Cinematography: Edwin S. Porter
- Distributed by: States Rights
- Release date: November 1, 1913
- Running time: 69 minutes
- Country: United States
- Language: Silent (English intertitles)

The Count of Monte Cristo is a 1913 silent film adventure directed by Joseph A. Golden and Edwin S. Porter, based on the adapted play of Alexandre Dumas' 1844 novel of the same name by Charles Fechter, adapted on screen by Hampton Del Ruth. It starred James O'Neill, a stage actor and father of playwright Eugene O'Neill. James O'Neill had been playing Edmond Dantès most of his adult life and was famous in the role. Daniel Frohman and Adolph Zukor produced together. Edwin S. Porter co-directed with Joseph Golden, though this was probably necessary as Porter also served as the film's cinematographer. The film was released on November 1, 1913.

A previous film by Selig starring Hobart Bosworth in 1912 had to be pulled from circulation as Zukor brought lawsuit against Selig for copyright infringement.

== Cast ==
- James O'Neill as Edmond Dantes / Count of Monte Cristo
- Nance O'Neil as Mercedes
- Murdock MacQuarrie as Danglars

== Reception ==
In Before the Nickelodeon, Charles Musser writes, "This remarkable record of late-nineteenth-century theatrical technique may not have been dynamic enough to launch the company's new line of original productions. O'Neill's acting style and the sets were incompatible with popular conceptions of realism and had become old-fashioned, even in the theater. When finally released late in 1913, The Count of Monte Cristo received little attention even in the trade press. Not surprisingly, the Porter-Golden collaboration was not repeated."

== Preservation ==
The film is preserved via paper print at the Library of Congress. It is also in the collections of the National Archives of Canada, Ottawa, the George Eastman House, and the BFI National Film and Television Archive.

== See also ==
- Edwin S. Porter filmography
