= Crauford Kent =

English actor (1881–1953)

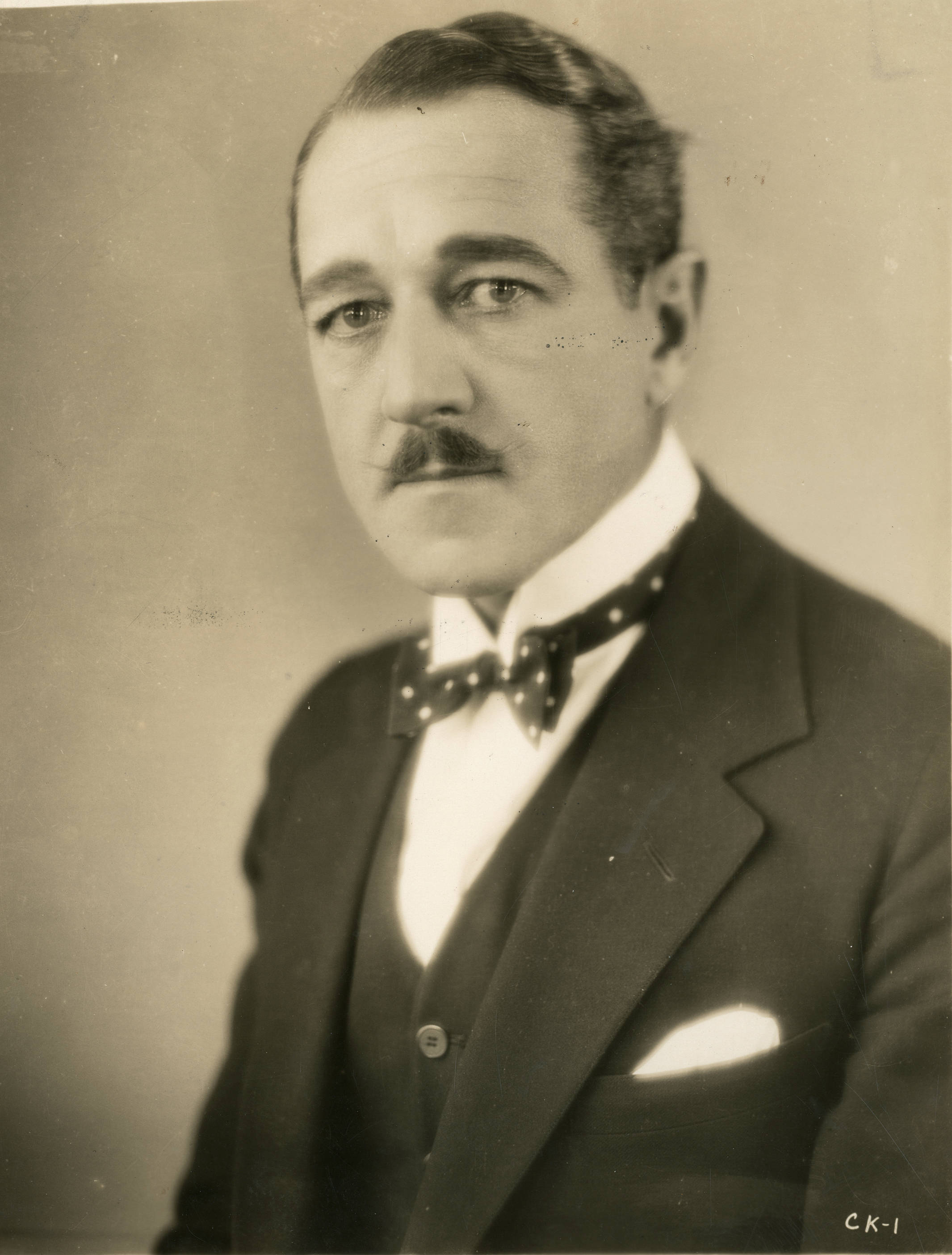
- Kent in 1925
- Born: 12 October 1881; London, England
- Died: 14 May 1953 (aged 71); Hollywood, California, U.S.
- Resting place: Pierce Brothers Valhalla Memorial Park
- Other names: Craufurd Kent; Crawford Kent
- Years active: 1915–1952

Crauford Kent (12 October 1881 – 14 May 1953) was an English character actor based in the United States. He has also been credited as Craufurd Kent and Crawford Kent.

== Biography ==
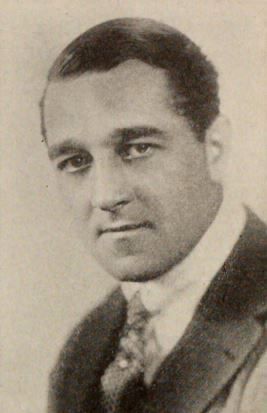
Kent in 1918

Kent was born on 12 October 1881 in London. A stage actor in England, Kent first came to the United States as a first-class passenger on the S/S Teutonic, docking at the Port of New York late in July 1910. For some time afterwards, he acted both in Great Britain and the United States. Between 1915 and 1952, Kent appeared in 208 American films, although frequently without screen credit, including Silas Marner, Seven Keys to Baldpate, The Ace of Scotland Yard, The Menace, The Wolf of Wall Street, Little Miss Marker, The Picture of Dorian Gray, The Dolly Sisters, and Pat and Mike.

== Death ==
Kent died in Hollywood, California of a heart attack at age 72. His grave is located at Pierce Brothers Valhalla Memorial Park.

== Selected filmography ==
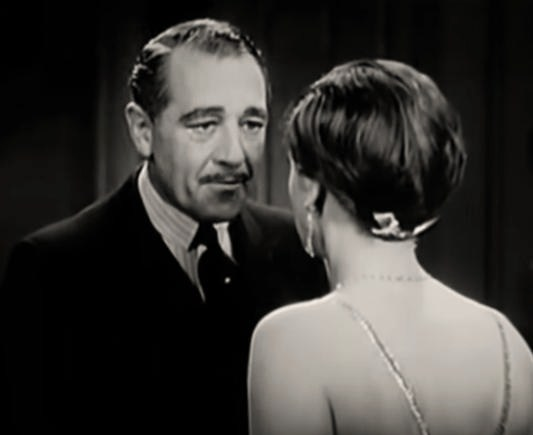
Crauford Kent and Lillian Rich in Grief Street (1931)

- The Deep Purple (1915) – Harry Leland
- Greater Love Hath No Man (1915) – Harold
- Simon, the Jester (1915) – Dale Kingsley
- The Pretenders (1915) – Dick Mason – a Young Clubman
- Nedra (1915) – Henry Veath
- Sorrows of Happiness (1916) – David Garrick
- Her Bleeding Heart (1916) – Allen Craven
- Dollars and the Woman (1916) – Arthur Crewe
- Love's Toll (1916) – Allen Crauben
- The Evil Thereof (1916) – The Barber
- The Heart of the Hills (1916) – McInnes
- Broadway Jones (1917) – Robert Wallace
- Double Crossed (1917) – Frederick Stratton
- The Antics of Ann (1917) – Gordon Trent
- Thaïs (1917) – Lollius
- The Woman Beneath (1917)
- The Song of Songs (1918) – Dick Laird
- The Knife (1918) – Billy Meredith
- The Trap (1918) – Stuart Kendall
- The Ordeal of Rosetta (1918) – Aubrey Hapgood
- The Danger Mark (1918) – Jack Dysart
- The Inn of the Blue Moon (1918) – Charlton Sloane
- Kildare of Storm (1918) – Dr. Jacques Benoix
- The Better Half (1918) – Hendrick Thurston
- Thou Shalt Not (1919) – The Minister
- Good Gracious, Annabelle (1919) – George Wimbledon
- Come Out of the Kitchen (1919) – Randolf Weeks
- The Splendid Romance (1919) – Minor Role
- The Career of Katherine Bush (1919) – Lord Gerald Strobridge
- Other Men's Shoes (1920) – Stephen Browning
- Youthful Folly (1920) – David Montgomery
- Sinners (1920) – Dr. Simpson
- Dollars and the Woman (1920) – Arthur Carewe
- The Love Flower (1920) – Mrs. Bevan's Visitor
- Clothes (1920) – Richard Burbank
- The Plaything of Broadway (1921) – Dr. Jennings
- Jane Eyre (1921) – St. John Rivers
- Shadows of the Sea (1922) – Andrews
- Other Women's Clothes (1922) – Rupert Lewis
- The Hidden Woman (1922) – Bart Andrews
- Silas Marner (1922) – Silas Marner
- Shirley of the Circus (1922) – James Blackthorne
- The Abysmal Brute (1923) – Deane Warner
- The Self-Made Wife (1923) – Tim Godwin
- Mothers-in-Law (1923) – Alden Van Buren
- The Eagle's Feather (1923) – Count De Longe
- Daddies (1923) – William Rivers
- Lilies of the Field (1924) – Walter Harker
- Flowing Gold (1924) – Henry Nelson
- The Guilty One (1924) – Seaton Davies
- Lovers' Lane (1924) – Herbert Woodbridge
- Virtue's Revolt (1924) – Bertram Winthrope
- The Painted Flapper (1924) – Egbert Von Alyn
- Turned Up (1924) – Paul Gilmore
- Easy Money (1925) – Lewis
- Man and Maid (1925) – Colonel George Harcourt
- The Pride of the Force (1925) – Charley Weldon
- The Midshipman (1925) – Basil Courtney
- Seven Keys to Baldpate (1925) – Bentley
- The Outsider (1926) – Dr. Ladd
- Fifth Avenue (1926) – Allan Trainor
- Pirates of the Sky (1926) – Bruce Mitchell
- Out of the Storm (1926) – Defense Attorney
- Morganson's Finish (1926) – G.T. Williams
- The Winning Wallop (1926) – Lawrence Duncan
- College Days (1926) – Kent
- That Model from Paris (1926) – Henry Marsh
- See You in Jail (1927) – Roger Morrisey
- Mother (1927) – Ellis
- The Missing Link (1927) – Lord Melville Dryden
- Rose of the Bowery (1927)
- His Dog (1927) – Mr. Gault
- Little Mickey Grogan (1927) – Mr. Cabel
- Wallflowers (1928) – Maulsby
- Queen of the Chorus (1928) – Spencer Steele
- The Olympic Hero (1928) – Man-About-Town
- Into No Man's Land (1928) – Th Duke
- The Foreign Legion (1928) – Capt. Arnaud
- Out with the Tide (1928) – Ralph Kennedy
- Manhattan Knights (1928) – Henry Ryder
- Bitter Sweets (1928) – Paul Gebhardt
- Show Folks (1928) – McNary – Vaudeville Producer
- Blindfold (1928) – Ackroyd
- Man, Woman and Wife (1929) – Wade / Ward Rogers
- The Wolf of Wall Street (1929) – Jessup
- The Charlatan (1929) – District Attorney Frank Deering
- Cherchez la Femme (1929)
- Come Across (1929) – George Harcourt
- The Ace of Scotland Yard (1929, a lost Universal serial) – Inspector Angus Blake
- Seven Keys to Baldpate (1929) – Hal Bentley
- In the Next Room (1930) – The Lover (Prologue)
- Girl of the Port (1930) – Englishman (uncredited)
- The Second Floor Mystery (1930) – Capt. Fraser-Freer
- Ladies Love Brutes (1930) – Committeeman (uncredited)
- Sweethearts and Wives (1930) – Sir John Deptford
- The Unholy Three (1930) – Defense Attorney
- Three Faces East (1930) – General Hewlett
- The Devil to Pay! (1930) – Arthur
- Body and Soul (1931) – Major Burke
- Women Men Marry (1931) – John Graham
- Transatlantic (1931) – 1st Officer (uncredited)
- Grief Street (1931) – Alvin Merle
- Morals for Women (1931) – Mr. Marston
- Delicious (1931) – Ship's Officer (uncredited)
- Stung (1931) – Reporter
- Sally of the Subway (1932) – Moffitt
- The Menace (1932) – Sam Lewis
- Murder at Dawn (1932) – Arnstein
- Sinister Hands (1932) – Judge David McLeod
- Western Limited (1932) – James
- The Purchase Price (1932) – A.C. Peters – the Banker (uncredited)
- The Thirteenth Guest (1932) – Dr. Sherwood
- The Fighting Gentleman (1932) – Claude Morgan
- Payment Deferred (1932) – Broker (uncredited)
- File 113 (1933) – Ottoman
- Humanity (1933)
- Sailor Be Good (1933)
- The Eagle and the Hawk (1933) – General (uncredited)
- Her Resale Value (1933)
- Only Yesterday (1933) – Graves, Party Guest (uncredited)
- The Invisible Man (1933) – Doctor (uncredited)
- The House of Rothschild (1934) – Stock Trader #5
- The Lost Jungle (1934, Serial) – Prof. Livingston – Explorer [Chs. 2-3]
- Little Miss Marker (1934) – Doctor (uncredited)
- Down to Their Last Yacht (1934) – Saxophone Player (uncredited)
- Crimson Romance (1934) – English Officer
- Lady by Choice (1934) – Brooke (uncredited)
- We Live Again (1934) – Schonbock
- Evelyn Prentice (1934) – Party Guest (uncredited)
- The Man Who Reclaimed His Head (1934) – A Dignitary (uncredited)
- Vanessa: Her Love Story (1935) – Timothy
- Naughty Marietta (1935) – Minor Role (uncredited)
- Born to Gamble (1935) – Town and Country Club Member (uncredited)
- I Found Stella Parish (1935) – Lord Chamberlain (uncredited)
- Mutiny on the Bounty (1935) – Lt. Edwards
- Magnificent Obsession (1935) – Dr. Thomas (uncredited)
- The Walking Dead (1936) – British Radio Announcer (uncredited)
- Hitch Hike to Heaven (1936) – Edgar
- O'Malley of the Mounted (1936) – Inspector McGregor
- The Unguarded Hour (1936) – Inspector Thorpe (uncredited)
- The White Angel (1936) – Orderly in Raglan's Office (uncredited)
- It Couldn't Have Happened – But It Did (1936) – Bob Bennett
- Down the Stretch (1936) – Sir Oliver Martin
- The Luckiest Girl in the World (1936) – Judge
- Daniel Boone (1936) – Attorney General
- The Charge of the Light Brigade (1936) – Capt. Brown (uncredited)
- Rich Relations (1937) – Mr. Colby
- Navy Spy (1937) – Capt. Leeds
- The Soldier and the Lady (1937) – Grand Duke's Aide (uncredited)
- Parnell (1937) – Speaker of House (uncredited)
- Topper (1937) – Board Member (uncredited)
- The Toast of New York (1937) – Member of the Board of Directors (uncredited)
- Souls at Sea (1937) – Navy Clerk (uncredited)
- The Buccaneer (1938) – Victory Ball Guest (uncredited)
- Love, Honor and Behave (1938) – Tennis Announcer
- The Adventures of Robin Hood (1938) – Sir Norbett (uncredited)
- Blond Cheat (1938) – Police Inspector Jones (uncredited)
- Letter of Introduction (1938) – Mr. Sinclair (uncredited)
- Service de Luxe (1938) – Mr. Devereaux
- A Christmas Carol (1938) – Scrooge's Tall Business Associate (uncredited)
- I Was a Convict (1939) – Dr. Garson
- The Story of Alexander Graham Bell (1939) – General (uncredited)
- Pride of the Blue Grass (1939) – Chief Steward (uncredited)
- Rulers of the Sea (1939) – Member of Naval Company (uncredited)
- Rovin' Tumbleweeds (1939) – Lobbyist Hutton (uncredited)
- We Are Not Alone (1939) – Dr. Stacey
- British Intelligence (1940) – Cmdr. Phelps (uncredited)
- I Was an Adventuress (1940) – Englishman at Party (uncredited)
- The Sea Hawk (1940) – Lieutenant (uncredited)
- Foreign Correspondent (1940) – Toastmaster (uncredited)
- A Dispatch from Reuters (1940) – Editor Wanting Contract Voided (uncredited)
- The Letter (1940) – Robert's Friend at Bar (uncredited)
- South of Suez (1940) – Sedley
- Shining Victory (1941) – Dr. Corliss
- Time Out for Rhythm (1941) – Marlow (uncredited)
- Our Wife (1941) – Ship's Doctor (uncredited)
- International Squadron (1941) – Major Fresney (uncredited)
- A Yank in the R.A.F. (1941) – Group Captain (uncredited)
- Paris Calling (1941) – British Naval Officer (uncredited)
- Flight Lieutenant (1942) – Company Official (uncredited)
- Journey for Margaret (1942) – Everton (uncredited)
- Keeper of the Flame (1942) – Ambassador (uncredited)
- City Without Men (1943) – Prosecuting Attorney (uncredited)
- The Mysterious Doctor (1943) – Army Commander (uncredited)
- The Constant Nymph (1943) – Thorpe
- The Lodger (1944) – The King's Aide (uncredited)
- Four Jills in a Jeep (1944) – British Officer (uncredited)
- The Black Parachute (1944) – Prime Minister Paul (uncredited)
- The Picture of Dorian Gray (1945) – Friend (uncredited)
- The Fatal Witness (1945) – Jepson, the butler
- The Dolly Sisters (1945) – Man (uncredited)
- Kitty (1945) – Sir Joshua's Friend (uncredited)
- Devotion (1946) – Club Member (uncredited)
- The Verdict (1946) – Professional Man (uncredited)
- The Imperfect Lady (1947) – Headwaiter (uncredited)
- Unconquered (1947) – Chaplain (uncredited)
- If Winter Comes (1947) – Gambling Guest (uncredited)
- The Woman in White (1948) – Rector (uncredited)
- Samson and Delilah (1949) – Court Astrologer in Council Chambers (uncredited)
- Tea for Two (1950) – Stevens, the Butler (uncredited)
- Painting the Clouds with Sunshine (1951) – Board Member (uncredited)
- Pat and Mike (1952) – Tennis Umpire (uncredited) (final film role)
