= Silas Marner (1922 film) =

1922 film by Frank P. Donovan

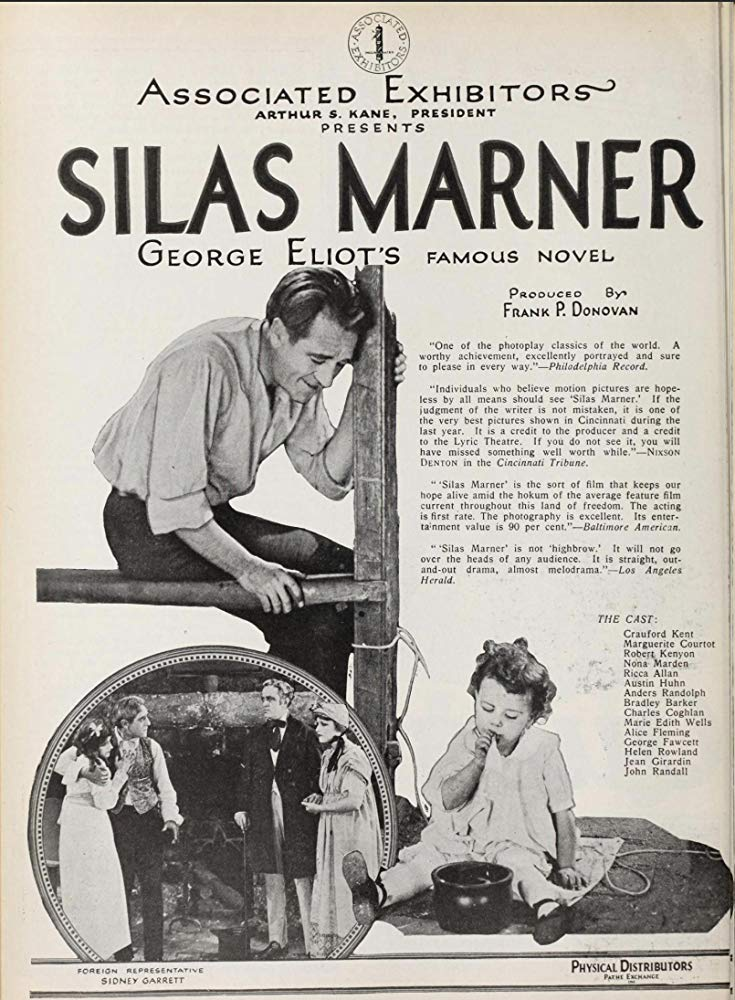
- Advertisement
- Directed by: Frank P. Donovan
- Written by: Frank P. Donovan
- Based on: Silas Marner by George Eliot
- Produced by: Frank P. Donovan
- Starring: Crauford Kent; Marguerite Courtot; Robert Kenyon
- Production company: Associated Exhibitors
- Distributed by: Associated Exhibitors
- Release date: May 1922
- Running time: 7 reels
- Country: United States
- Language: Silent (English intertitles)

Silas Marner is a 1922 American silent historical drama film directed by Frank P. Donovan and starring Crauford Kent, Marguerite Courtot, and Robert Kenyon. It is an adaptation of the 1861 novel of the same name by George Eliot.

== Plot ==
At Lantern Yard, Silas Marner is accused of theft and is betrayed by his best friend, who is in love with the woman Silas is engaged to. He is driven from the town and goes to Raveloe where he becomes a virtual hermit, piling up gold as a weaver. Over 15 years his faith in mankind and God are shaken; the only consolation is his pile of gold. One day this is stolen, and he becomes more of a recluse and even less friendly to his neighbors.

A dying woman leaves a baby girl on his doorstep, bringing a change to his distorted view of life. Under her influence he becomes a respected citizen of the town. The girl's father, unknown to Silas, a son of the wealthy Squire Cass, has been nursing the secret, pending his marriage to one of his set. After several years of marriage, the son confesses the duplicity to his wife, and they decide to claim the now young woman. Silas sees this as one more attempt to make him desolate. The young woman, however, would rather remain with Silas than go with her rightful father.

She is later happily married to a suitor with whom Silas makes his home.

== Cast ==
- Crauford Kent as Silas Marner
- Marguerite Courtot as Sarah
- Robert Kenyon as William Dane
- Nona Marden as Sally Oates
- Ricca Allen as Elina Tampscum
- Austin Hume as Jem Rodney
- Anders Randolf as Squire Cass
- Bradley Barker as Godfrey Cass
- Charles Coghlan as Dunsey Cass
- Marie Wells as Nancy Lammeter
- Alice Fleming as Dolly Winthrop
- George Fawcett as Dr. Kimble
- Helen Rowland as Eppie (as a child)
- Jean Girardin as Eppie (as a young woman)
- John Randall as Aaron Winthrop

== See also ==
- Silas Marner (1916 film)

== Bibliography ==
- Goble, Alan. The Complete Index to Literary Sources in Film. Walter de Gruyter, 1999.
