= The Little Firebrand =

1926 film by Charles Hutchison

- Directed by: Charles Hutchison
- Written by: Frederick Chapin
- Produced by: William Steiner
- Starring: Edith Thornton; George Fawcett; Lou Tellegen
- Production company: Hurricane Film Corporation
- Distributed by: Pathé Exchange
- Release date: August 16, 1926
- Running time: Length: 4,615 feet (1,407 m)
- Country: United States
- Languages: Silent; English intertitles

The Little Firebrand is a 1926 American silent comedy film directed by Charles Hutchison and starring Edith Thornton, George Fawcett and Lou Tellegen.

== Plot ==
Wealthy businessman Godfrey Jackson struggles to manage his spirited daughter, Dorothy, after the loss of her mother. In his absence, he entrusts Harley Norcross, a young lawyer from his firm, with her guardianship. When Dorothy overhears Norcross making a disparaging comment about her, she becomes determined to retaliate. Norcross imposes strict rules on Dorothy, including restrictions on driving, attending dances, and seeing her suitor, William. Despite his efforts, Dorothy defies these rules, and over time, both she and Norcross develop romantic feelings for each other. Dorothy persuades Norcross to join her in a car ride, which culminates in a thrilling crash. In a vulnerable moment, Dorothy confesses her love to Norcross, believing him to be unconscious. Eventually, the two reconcile and find love together.

== Cast ==
- Edith Thornton as Dorothy Jackson
- George Fawcett as Godfrey Jackson
- Lou Tellegen as Harley Norcross
- Eddie Phillips as William
- Joan Standing as Miss Smyth
- Lincoln Stedman as Tubby
- Gino Corrado as Adonis Wenhoff
- Helen Crawford as Maid
- Ben Walker as Butler

== Bibliography ==
- Munden, Kenneth White. The American Film Institute Catalog of Motion Pictures Produced in the United States, Part 1. University of California Press, 1997.
