= A Woman's Wit =

1910 film

- Directed by: Joseph A. Golden
- Release date: 1910
- Country: United States
- Language: Silent (English intertitles)

A Woman's Wit is a 1910 American short silent Western film directed by Joseph A. Golden. It stars Pearl White and Stuart Holmes.

== Plot ==
Bandits kidnap Grace, a judge's daughter, and demand that he orders the release from jail of one of their friends. Grace manages to outwit the gang and sends her horse home, carrying a message in a handkerchief. The message is found by the sheriff and Grace is rescued.

== Cast ==
- Pearl White as Grace Brown
- Stuart Holmes
