= Malcolm Tod =

British actor (1897–1968)

- Born: 16 March 1897; Burton-on-Trent, UK
- Died: 1 July 1968 (aged 71)
- Occupation: Actor
- Years active: 1921–1934

Malcolm Tod (16 March 1897 – 1 July 1968) was a British actor. He appeared in more than thirty films from 1921 to 1934.

== Selected filmography ==
Year	Title	Role	Notes
1934	Nine Forty-Five	James Everett	
1933	Love's Old Sweet Song		
1930	When Naples Sings		
1929	After the Verdict	Jim Gordon	
1928	The Carnival of Venice	Edward Jefferson	
1927	Poppies of Flanders	Bob Standish	
1926	The Woman Tempted	Basil Gilmore	
1926	The Chinese Bungalow		
1924	Hurricane Hutch in Many Adventures	Frank Mitchell	
1923	Hutch Stirs 'em Up	Tom Grey	
1923	The Romany	Robbie	
1923	The Portrait	Ingenieur	
1922	Expiation		
1921	Moth and Rust		
1921	Corinthian Jack		
