= Hurricane Hutch in Many Adventures =

1924 film

- Directed by: Charles Hutchison
- Written by: Eliot Stannard
- Starring: Charles Hutchison; Warwick Ward; Malcolm Tod; Edith Thornton
- Production company: Ideal Film Company
- Distributed by: Ideal Film Company
- Release date: 1924
- Country: United Kingdom
- Language: English

Hurricane Hutch in Many Adventures is a 1924 British silent comedy action film directed by Charles Hutchison and starring Charles Hutchison, Warwick Ward and Malcolm Tod.

== Cast ==
- Charles Hutchison - Hurricane Hutch
- Warwick Ward - Dick
- Malcolm Tod - Frank Mitchell
- Edith Thornton - Nancy Norris
- Robert Vallis - Hugh
- Ernest A. Douglas - Mr. Mitchell
- Daisy Campbell - Mrs. Mitchell
- Cecil Rayne - Butler
