= The Woman in 47 =

1916 silent film directed by George Irving

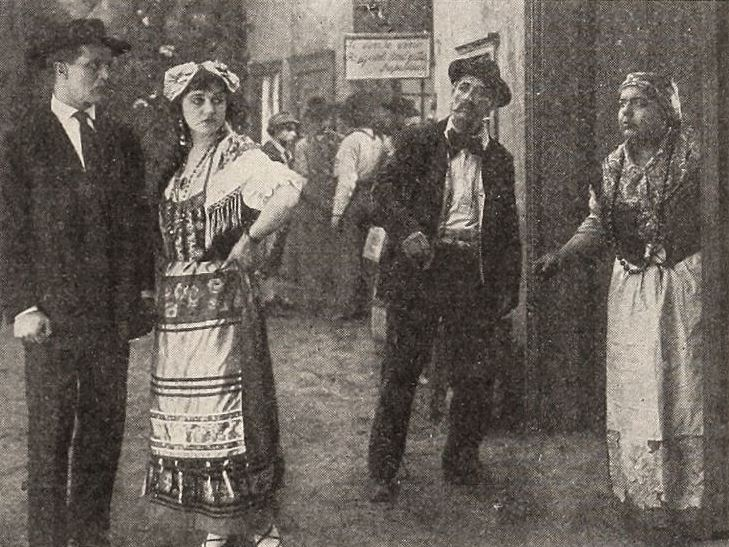
- Film still
- Directed by: George Irving
- Written by: Frederick Chaplin
- Production company: The Frohman Amusement Corp
- Distributed by: World Films
- Release date: 1916
- Running time: 50 minutes
- Country: United States

The Woman in 47, reissued as The Mysterious Woman, is a 1916 silent film directed by George Irving for Equitable Motion Picture Company and Frohman Amusement Corporation. It was filmed at Peerless Studios in Fort Lee, New Jersey.

The cast includes Alice Brady, William Raymond, Jack Sherrill, Etta De Groff, Ralph Dean and John Warwick (American actor). The story was by Frederick Chapin. The New Brunswick Times ran a review of the "photoplay".
