= The Masked Rider (1919 film) =

1919 film

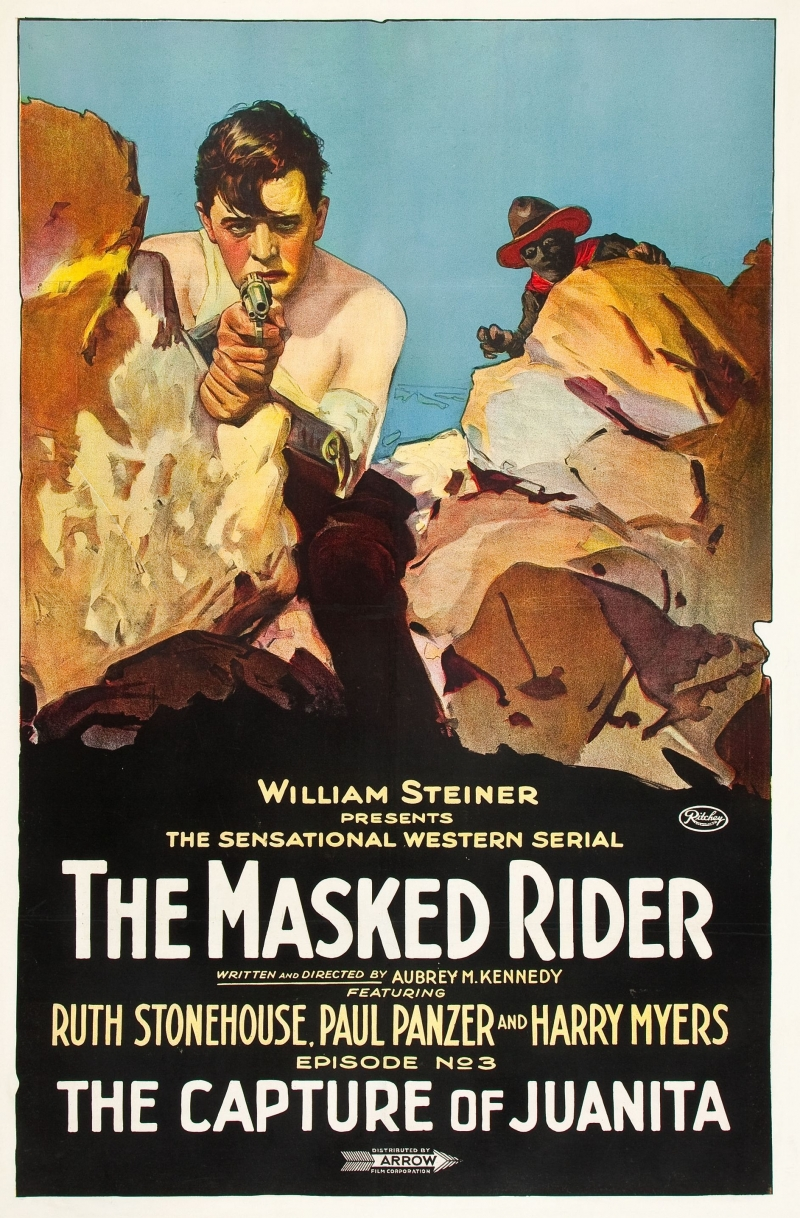
- Film poster
- Directed by: Aubrey M. Kennedy
- Written by: Aubrey M. Kennedy
- Produced by: William Steiner; Patrick Sylvester McGeeney (Shamrock Motion Pictures)
- Starring: Harry Myers; Ruth Stonehouse
- Cinematography: Jacob A. Badaracco; Arthur Boeger
- Distributed by: Arrow Film Corp.
- Release date: May 7, 1919 (Chapter One)
- Running time: 15 episodes
- Country: United States
- Languages: Silent; English intertitles

The Masked Rider is a 1919 American silent Western film serial directed by Aubrey M. Kennedy. Scenes were filmed in Mission San Jose in San Antonio, Castroville and Bandera, Texas, and in Coahuíla, Mexico.

The serial was long thought to be lost in entirety. In 2003, however, The Serial Squadron Co. acquired 22 color-toned 35mm nitrate reels of a surviving print of the serial which had been recovered from the estate of a former Pennsylvania theatrical projectionist who had condensed the serial many years ago, removing opening titles and leaving out first reels of several later chapters which contained more dialogue than action. Two reels of Chapter 1, the conclusion of Chapter 3 and most of Chapter 11 are missing. Chapter One and the conclusion of Chapter 3 were recreated by The Serial Squadron using local actors. The condensed version of the serial, restored by Eric Stedman and presented in 9 chapters, with opening and closing titles, is available on dvd.

The Masked Rider is considered to be the first film serial about a major masked mystery-Western character who is referred to by his name in the title, and can thus be considered a prototype "Lone Ranger" of sorts. The 15-episode serial is also significant for being the earliest surviving film appearance of actor Boris Karloff. His appearance in the film is disputed by some but most sources, including the 1970s Karloff biography by Peter Underwood, list Karloff as being in the film. Karloff himself provided information for the Underwood book in which the serial is listed in his filmography as "The Masked Raider" which is how he remembered it. Karloff had been hired to play the villainous Rodriguez (who, after causing a great deal of trouble, is shot down by the Masked Rider in the first chapter) and multiple other roles in the rest of the serial, but did not arrive in San Antonio in time to shoot Chapter 1 so his part was recast and after he did arrive at the Shamrock studio he was given pay for a day's work in chapter 2. The Masked Rider's all-black costume was adapted for use by Zorro in the Douglas Fairbanks feature which was released later in 1919. Up to that point Zorro had been portrayed in magazine illustrations as wearing a sombrero and colorful Mexican attire.

== Plot ==
This violent Western serial takes place along the Mexican border. When warned by Captain Jack of the Texas Rangers of impending raids, elderly rancher Bill Burrel swears that Mexican cattle rustler Pancho won't do any riding or shooting in the area again. Pancho's lieutenant Santas, (who desires his boss's daughter Juanita's hand, and has been rejected), overhears Burrel and decides to make things rough on Pancho by stirring up trouble for both sides. Pancho and his raiders, sworn to drive the settlers out of the border country, attack the Burrel ranch and kill Burrel, and his son Harry swears to make Pancho pay. In the conflict that follows, Pancho is knocked out and his hands purposely crushed in a press by masked men, who he thinks are Texas Rangers. The torture was actually carried out by the traitorous Santas and his friend Rodriguez, but Pancho blames the Texas Rangers for his injuries and swears revenge, and they all resolve to kill each other.

In the succeeding chapters, Pancho and his gang menace Harry Burrel and his sweetheart Ruth Chadwick, and kidnap Harry's younger sister Blanche Burrel, inflicting tortures upon them. Pancho's evil demands are carried out by the black-garbed Masked Rider, who rides onto the scene without warning to kidnap, assault, or shoot the Texas Rangers, their relatives, and even their horses. Pancho's daughter Juanita is alarmed by her father's cruelty and does everything she can to prevent his murdering any of his captives whenever she can. She also falls in love with Captain Jack Hathaway of the Rangers.

Rugged "Ma" Chadwick, Ruth's mother, helps the Rangers when Blanche and later Ruth are both kidnapped. Interesting shooting locations include a hacienda complex in Sabinas, Mexico, an ancient mission in San Antonio, the gigantic Medina Dam (at which one stupendous action sequence was apparently improvised as the scene does not appear in the original shooting script), and the "Hole in the Wall", a labyrinth-like passage through the mountains on the Medina River.

== Cast ==
- Harry Myers as Harry Burrel
- Ruth Stonehouse as Ruth Chadwick, Harry's sweetheart
- Paul Panzer as Pancho, cattle rustler and bandit
- Edna M. Holland as Juanita, Pancho's daughter
- Marie Treador as Ma Chadwick, Ruth's mother (Treador was the producer's wife)
- Blanche Gillespie as Blanche Burrel, Harry's younger sister
- Robert Taber as Santas, Pancho's lieutenant
- George Chapman as Captain Jack Hathaway of the Texas Rangers
- Boris Karloff as the menacing Mexican in saloon, appearing in Chapter 2 only
- George Murdock
- George Cravy

== Chapter titles ==
- The Hole in the Wall
- In the Hands of Pancho
- The Capture of Juanita
- The Kiss of Hate
- The Death Trap
- Pancho Plans Revenge
- The Fight on the Dam
- The Conspirators Foiled
- Exchange of Prisoners
- Harry's Perilous Leap
- To the Rescue
- The Impostor
- Coals of Fire
- In the Desert's Grip
- Retribution

== See also ==
- List of film serials
- List of film serials by studio
- Medina Dam featured in the serial
