= On Probation (1924 film) =

1924 film

- Directed by: Charles Hutchison
- Written by: Jack Natteford
- Produced by: William Steiner
- Starring: Edith Thornton; Robert Ellis; Joseph Kilgour
- Cinematography: Ernest Miller
- Production company: William Steiner Productions
- Distributed by: William Steiner Productions; Wardour Films (UK)
- Release date: December 1, 1924
- Running time: 50 minutes
- Country: United States
- Language: Silent (English intertitles)

On Probation is a 1924 American silent drama film directed by Charles Hutchison and starring Edith Thornton, Robert Ellis, and Joseph Kilgour.

== Plot ==
As described in a 1924 film magazine review:

Mary Forrest (Thorton), rich, young, and impulsive, is warned not to appear before Judge Winter (Kilgour) again on speeding charges. Her friends accompany her to a roadhouse which the police are watching. They are tipped off and flee before the police raid the place, but Mary wrecks her automobile. Removing the plates and identification marks, she escapes the law until a jealous friend plants a purse in the wrecked car. When asked to secure someone to sign her probation bond, she finds her “friends” have deserted her and Bruce Winter (Ellis) comes to her rescue.

== Cast ==
- Edith Thornton as Mary Forrest
- Robert Ellis as Bruce Winter
- Joseph Kilgour as Judge Winter
- Wilfred Lucas as Detective Reilly
- Helen Lynch as Nan Miller
- Eddie Phillips as Phil Coleman
- Betty Francisco as Dolores Coleman
- Lincoln Stedman as Ralph Norton
