= A Private Scandal (1931 film) =

1931 film

- Directed by: Charles Hutchison
- Written by: Jack Natteford
- Produced by: Charles Hutchison
- Starring: Marian Nixon; Lloyd Hughes; Theodore von Eltz
- Cinematography: Ernest Miller
- Edited by: Richard Cahoon
- Production company: Charles Hutchison Productions
- Distributed by: Headline Pictures
- Release date: December 31, 1931
- Running time: 67 minutes
- Country: United States
- Language: English

A Private Scandal is a 1931 American pre-Code crime drama film directed by Charles Hutchison and starring Marian Nixon, Lloyd Hughes and Theodore von Eltz. It was distributed by the independent Headline Pictures.

== Plot ==
After a jewel robbery at the home of a member of the Boston elite, Count Raymond d'Alencourt is arrested by police due to his previous record. However, his accomplices get away with the loot and go to ground in a small Connecticut town. One of them marries Mary Gate, the daughter of a local family as cover for smuggling the jewels into New York.

== Cast ==
- Marian Nixon as Mary Gate
- Lloyd Hughes as Daniel Treve
- Theodore von Eltz as Matthew Gray
- Lucille Powers as Rita Gray
- Fletcher Norton as Count Raymond d'Alencourt
- Eddie Phillips as Eddie
- Burr McIntosh as The Judge
- George Willis as George
- Fred 'Snowflake' Toones as Snowflake
- Walter Hiers as Honest John
- Broderick O'Farrell as Senator
- Dorothy Vernon as Landlady

== Preservation ==
The film is preserved in nitrate UCLA Film and TV Archive.

== Bibliography ==
- Langman, Larry. A Guide to American Film Directors: The Sound Era, 1929-1979, Volume 1. Scarecrow Press, 1981.
