= Edith Thornton =

American actress (1896–1984)

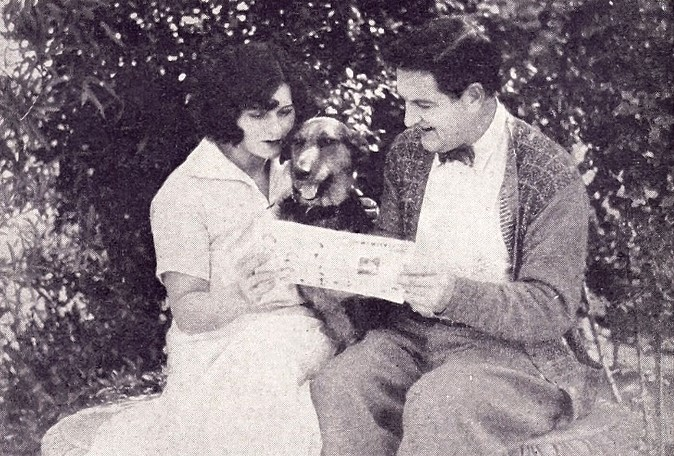
- Edith Thornton and her husband Charles Hutchison in 1925
- Born: January 9, 1896; New York City, New York, United States
- Died: February 13, 1984 (aged 88); Glendale, California, United States
- Occupation: Actress
- Years active: 1914–1933 (film)
- Spouse: Charles Hutchison

Edith Thornton (1896–1984) was an American film actress of the silent era. She was married to the actor Charles Hutchison, appearing with him in several films and serials.

== Selected filmography ==
- The Better Woman (1915)
- It May Be Your Daughter (1916)
- The Great Gamble (1919)
- Hurricane Hutch in Many Adventures (1924)
- Surging Seas (1924)
- On Probation (1924)
- Virtue's Revolt (1924)
- Poison (1924)
- Hutch of the U.S.A. (1924)
- Fair Play (1925)
- Was It Bigamy? (1925)
- Lightning Hutch (1926)
- The Little Firebrand (1926)
- The Mystic Hour (1933)

== Bibliography ==
- Katchmer, George A. A Biographical Dictionary of Silent Film Western Actors and Actresses. McFarland, 2015.
- Langman, Larry. American Film Cycles: The Silent Era. Greenwood Publishing, 1998.
