= The Ace of Scotland Yard =

1929 film by Ray Taylor

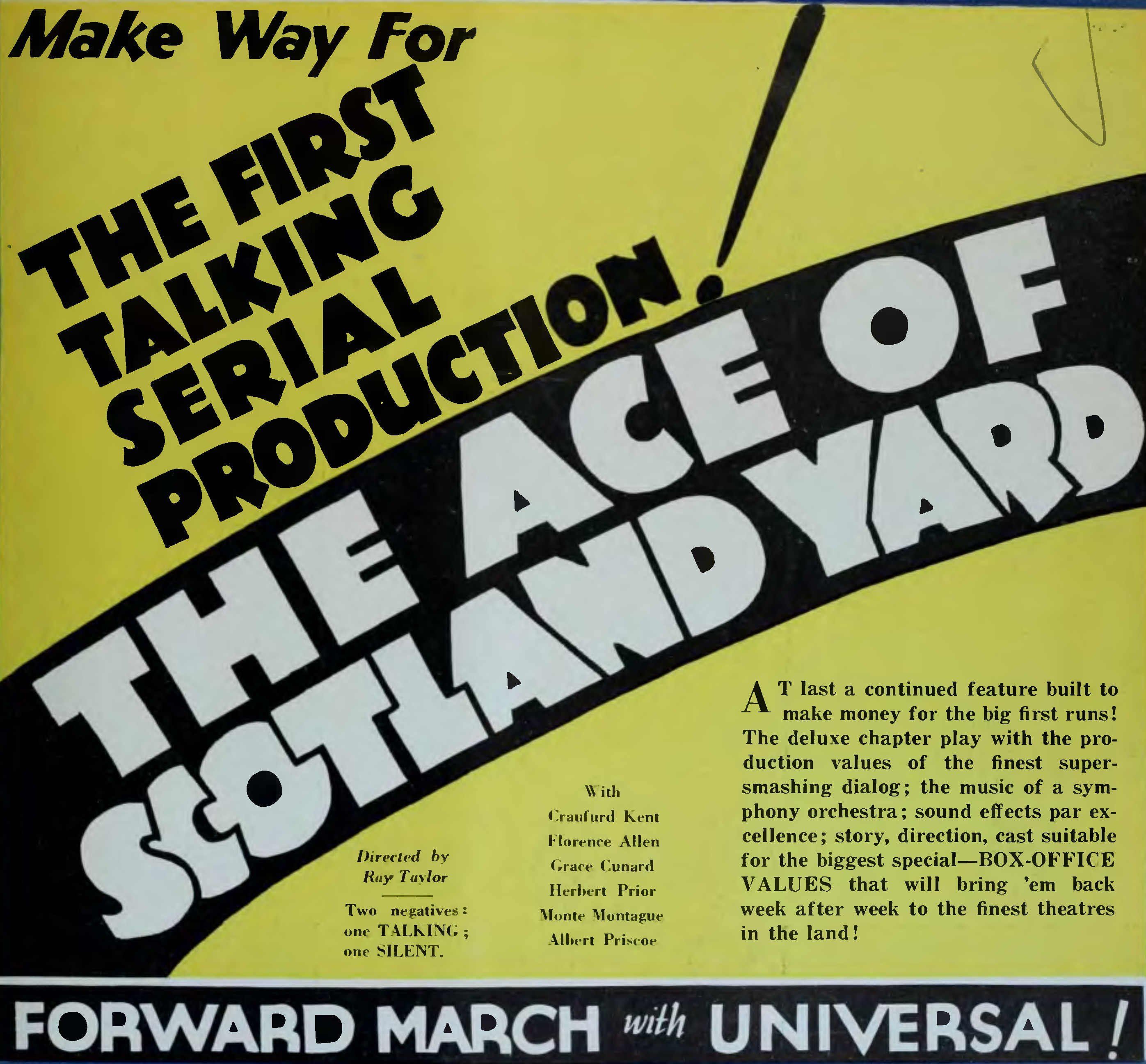
- Directed by: Ray Taylor
- Screenplay by: Harold M. Atkinson
- Story by: Harold M. Atkinson
- Starring: Crauford Kent; Florence Allen; Grace Cunard
- Cinematography: John Hickson
- Edited by: Alvin Todd
- Production company: Universal Pictures
- Release date: September 1929

The Ace of Scotland Yard is a 1929 Universal movie serial. It was the first partial sound serial released by Universal Pictures. The film was released in September 1929. It was a part-talkie serial using music and sound effects. It is considered a lost film.

This serial was a sequel to the 1927 12-chapter silent Universal serial Blake of Scotland Yard.

== Plot ==
Retired CID inspector Angus Blake tries to prevent a female jewel thief named the Queen of Diamonds from stealing a valuable ring which, according to legend, carries a curse.

== Cast ==
- Crauford Kent as Angus Blake, retired CID Inspector
- Monte Montague as Jarvis, Blake's servant
- Grace Cunard as Queen of Diamonds, famous jewel thief disguised as Lord Blanton's housekeeper Mary Duveen
- Florence Allen as Lady Diana Blanton, Lord Blanton's daughter
- Herbert Prior as Lord Blanton, owner of the cursed ring
- Albert Prisco as Prince Darius, desires the ring and hires the Queen of Diamonds to steal it

== Production ==
In addition to the sound version, a silent version of the cliffhanger was made for theatres not equipped to display sound films. Harold M. Atkinson wrote the serial based on his own original plot and Ray Taylor directed it.

== Chapter titles ==
1. The Fatal Circlet
2. A Cry in the Night
3. The Dungeon of Doom
4. Menace of the Mummy
5. The Depths of Limehouse
6. Dead or Alive
7. Shadows of Fear
8. The Baited Trap
9. A Battle of Wits
10. The Fatal Judgement

== Reception ==
Movie Age gave a positive review of the serial after watching the first three chapters, noting that "the picture carries a punch" and "if the succeeding chapters measure up with the first three, this serial is going to be a wow." The Film Daily declared it "a gripping serial [that] carries a lot of fast action and suspense", specifically stating: "The camera work is exceptionally good, and the direction by Ray Taylor is aces."

== See also ==
- List of film serials
- List of film serials by studio
