= Lucille Powers =

American actress (1911–1981)

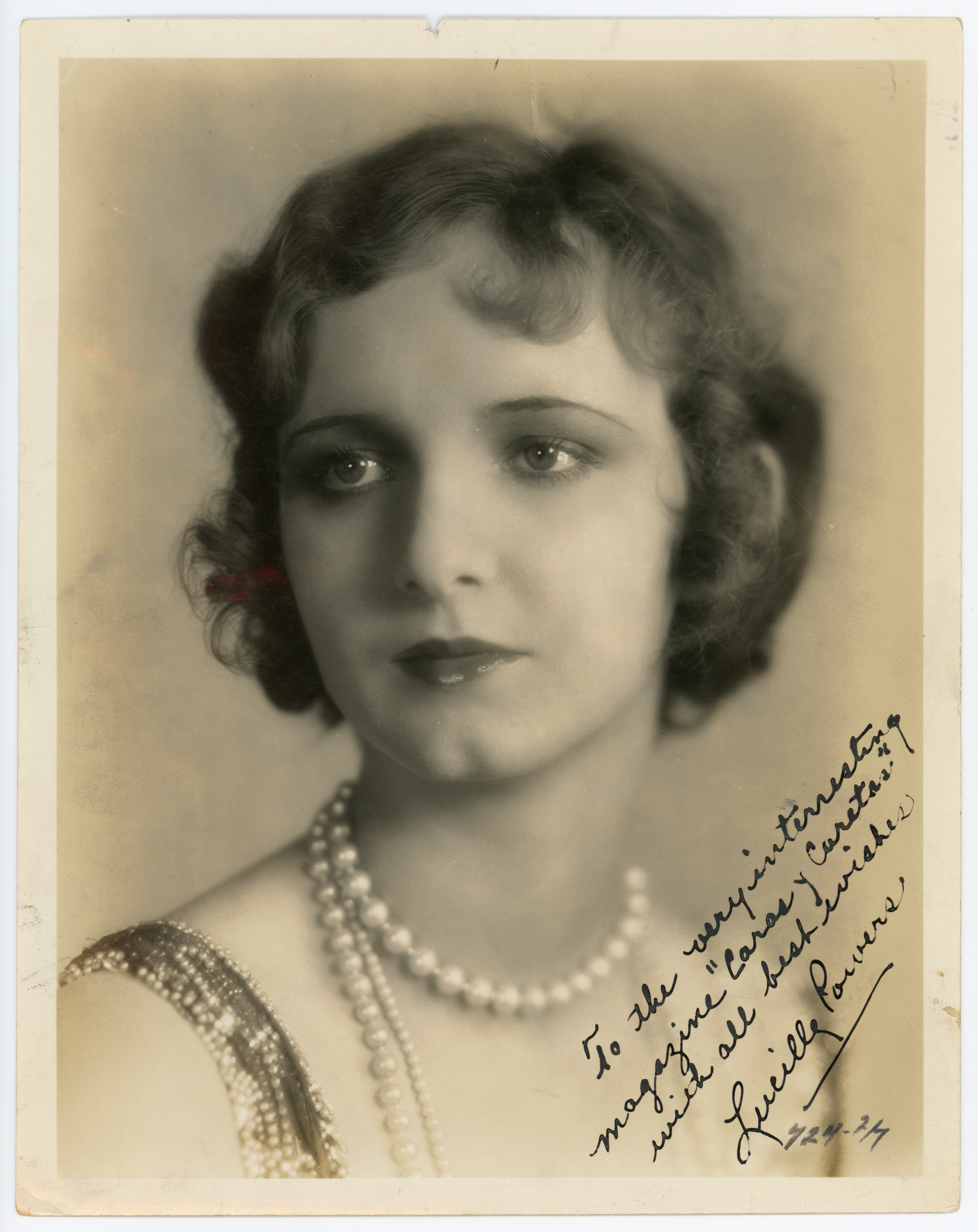
- Born: November 18, 1911; San Antonio, Texas, U.S.
- Died: September 11, 1981 (aged 69)
- Occupation: Actress
- Years active: 1928-1933

Lucille Powers (November 18, 1911 – September 11, 1981) was an American actress who appeared in silent film and "talkies" in the 1920s and 1930s.

== Biography ==
Powers was born in San Antonio, Texas, the daughter of Jay and Helene Powers. Her father was an attorney, and her mother was head of Converse College's oral English department. When she was young, she and her family moved to Spartanburg, South Carolina. She attended elementary school there and graduated from Spartanburg High School in 1927.

Powers acted for two summers in Spartanburg with the Edna Park and Jack Edwards stock theater company, after which she acted with stock troupes in Dallas and Los Angeles. Her performances in Los Angeles brought her to the attention of film executives.

Powers went from South Carolina to Hollywood in 1928. During her first 18 months in film, she had only bit parts except for a featured role in Marquis Preferred.

== Filmography ==
- Three Weekends (1928)
- Marquis Preferred (1929)
- Untamed (1929) (uncredited)
- The Cossack's Bride (1929)
- King of Jazz (1930)
- Man to Man (1930)
- Two Gun Man (1931)
- A Private Scandal (1931)
- Amateur Daddy (1932)
- The Texas Bad Man (1932)
- The Mystic Hour (1934)
- Only Yesterday (1933)
