= Hutch Stirs 'em Up =

1923 film

- Directed by: Frank Hall Crane
- Written by: Harry Harding; Eliot Stannard
- Starring: Charles Hutchison; Joan Barry; Malcolm Tod; Gibson Gowland
- Production company: Ideal Film Company
- Distributed by: Ideal Film Company
- Release date: August 1923
- Country: United Kingdom
- Language: English

Hutch Stirs 'em Up is a 1923 British silent comedy action film directed by Frank Hall Crane and starring Charles Hutchison, Joan Barry and Malcolm Tod. It was based on the novel The Hawk of Rede by Harry Harding.

== Cast ==
- Charles Hutchison as Hurricane Hutch
- Joan Barry as Joan
- Malcolm Tod as Tom Grey
- Gibson Gowland as Sir Arthur Blackross
- Sunday Wilshin as Mrs. Grey
- Aubrey Fitzgerald as Crudelas
- Violet Forbes as Mrs. Cruddas
