= Joseph A. Golden =

American screenwriter and film director (1897–1942)

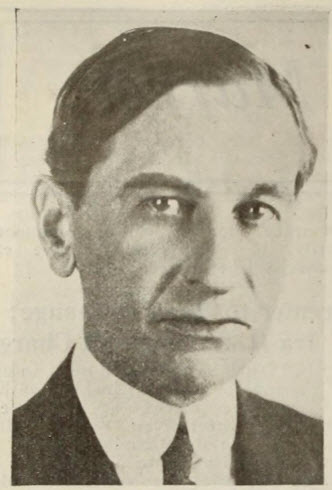
- Joseph A. Golden
- Occupation: Film director
- Years active: 1907–1911

Joseph A. Golden was a silent film director and screenwriter in the United States. His films include A Woman's Wit and Resurrection. He began working in film in 1907, directing the one-reel film The Hypnotist's Revenge for American Mutoscope & Biograph.

Golden worked for Biograph until Jeremiah Kennedy's arrival in 1907. He was then the chief director at Triumph Film Corporation. In 1910, he worked for Pat Powers' production company, directing a few films with Pearl White. Specializing in adventure films and westerns, he moved on to work for Selig Polyscope. In 1911 alone, he made thirty films. In his career as a director, which lasted thirteen years to 1920, he directed 75 films. From 1911 to 1924, he wrote the screenplay for at least twelve films, most of which he also directed. In 1915, he produced Divorced, directed by Edward Warren and shot in New York. Golden also worked at Crystal Studios with Ludwig G. B. Erb. He died in Los Angeles.

== Filmography ==
This is a partial filmography. Golden was the director unless stated otherwise.

- The Hypnotist's Revenge (1907)
- The Tired Tailor's Dream (1907)
- Terrible Ted (1907)
- His Mother's Letter (1910)
- The Girl from Arizona (1910)
- The Horse Shoer's Girl (1910)
- The Burlesque Queen (1910)
- The Matinee Idol (1910)
- The Music Teacher (1910)
- A Woman's Wit (1910)
- The New Magdalen (1910)
- The Woman Hater (1910)
- When the World Sleeps (1910)
- Helping Him Out (1911)
- The Angel of the Slums (1911)
- A Novel Experiment (1911)
- Montana Anna (1911)
- The Visiting Nurse (1911), director and screenwriter
- The Mission Worker (1911), director and screenwriter
- The New Editor (1911)
- His Birthday (1911)
- Two Lives (1911)
- The Warrant (1911)
- The Tale of a Soldier's Ring (1911)
- A Fair Exchange (1911), director and screenwriter
- A Tennessee Love Story (1911), director and screenwriter
- A Prisoner of the Mohicans (1911)
- For Massa's Sake (1911)
- Told in Colorado (1911), director and screenwriter
- Why the Sheriff Is a Bachelor (1911), screenwriter and co-directed with Tom Mix
- Love Molds Labor (1911)
- Western Hearts (1911), director and screenwriter
- The Terms of the Will
- The Power of Love (1911)
- Love's Renunciation (1911)
- The Reporter (1911)
- The Lost Necklace (1911)
- Her Little Slipper (1911)
- For the Honor of the Name (1912)
- A Nation's Peril (1912)
- The Arrowmaker's Daughter (1912)
- The Hand of Destiny (1912)
- Pals (1912)
- Resurrection (1912)
- The Man from the North Pole (1912)
- The Girl in the Next Room (1912)
- Oh, Such a Night! (1912)
- The Gypsy Flirt (1912)
- The Quarrel (1912)
- Locked Out (1912)
- The Compact (1912)
- The Mad Lover (1912)
- The Eye of a God (1913), director and screenwriter
- The Secret Formula (1913)
- The Count of Monte Cristo (1913), co-directed with Edwin S. Porter
- Hearts and Flowers (1914)
- Divorced (1915), as producer only; film directed by Edward Warren
- Lady Audley's Secret (1915)
- The Masqueraders (1915)
- The Trunk Mystery (1915)
- Fine Feathers (1915), an adaptation of Fine Feathers (play)
- The Master of the House (1915)
- The Price (1915), director and screenwriter
- The Better Woman (1915)
- Not Guilty (1915)
- The Senator (1915), an adaptation of The Senator (play)
- Behind Closed Doors or Love's Crossroads (1916)
- The Prima Donna's Husband (1916), co-directed with Julius Steiger
- The Libertine (1916)
- The Law of Compensation (1917)
- Redemption (1917), co-directed with Julius Steiger
- Wolves of Kultur (1918 serial), director and screenwriter
- The Great Gamble (1919), director and screenwriter
- The Whirlwind (1920 serial), director and screenwriter
- The Fatal Plunge (1924), screenwriter
