= Hughie Mack =

American actor (1884–1927)

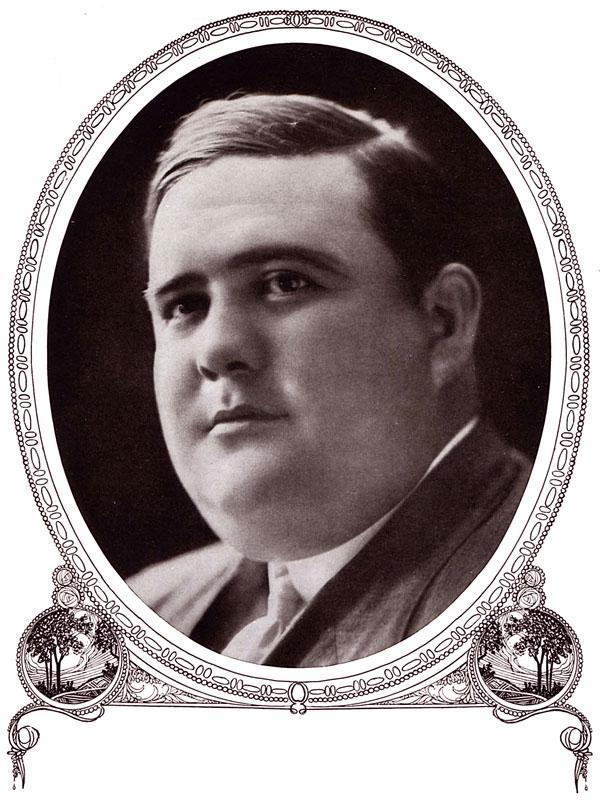
- Born: November 26, 1884; Brooklyn, New York
- Died: October 13, 1927 (aged 42); Santa Monica, California
- Occupation: Actor
- Years active: 1910–1927

Hughie Mack (November 26, 1884 – October 13, 1927) was an American actor of the silent era. He appeared in more than 190 films between 1910 and 1928.

He was born in Brooklyn, New York. He was working as a mortician when he paid a casual visit to the Vitagraph studio in Brooklyn. His large frame and comical facial expression made Vitagraph's star comedian John Bunny laugh. As Picture Play Magazine reported, "The Vitagraph people decided that, if he was funny enough to amuse their star, he could also entertain the public. So he was hired." He later became a prolific character comedian in feature films.

In late 1927 he suffered heart failure and died in his sleep at his home in Santa Monica, California.

== Partial filmography ==
- As You Like It (1912)
- C.O.D. (1914)
- Too Many Husbands (1914)
- Bringing Up Father (1915)
- Are Waitresses Safe? (1917)
- A Woman's Faith (1920)
- Trifling Women (1922)
- Going Up (1923)
- Reno (1923)
- The Riddle Rider (1924)
- Greed (1924)
- Mare Nostrum (1926)
- The Silent Flyer (1926)
- The Arizona Whirlwind (1927)
- Four Sons (1928)
- The Wedding March (1928)
