= Wolves of Kultur =

1918 film serial

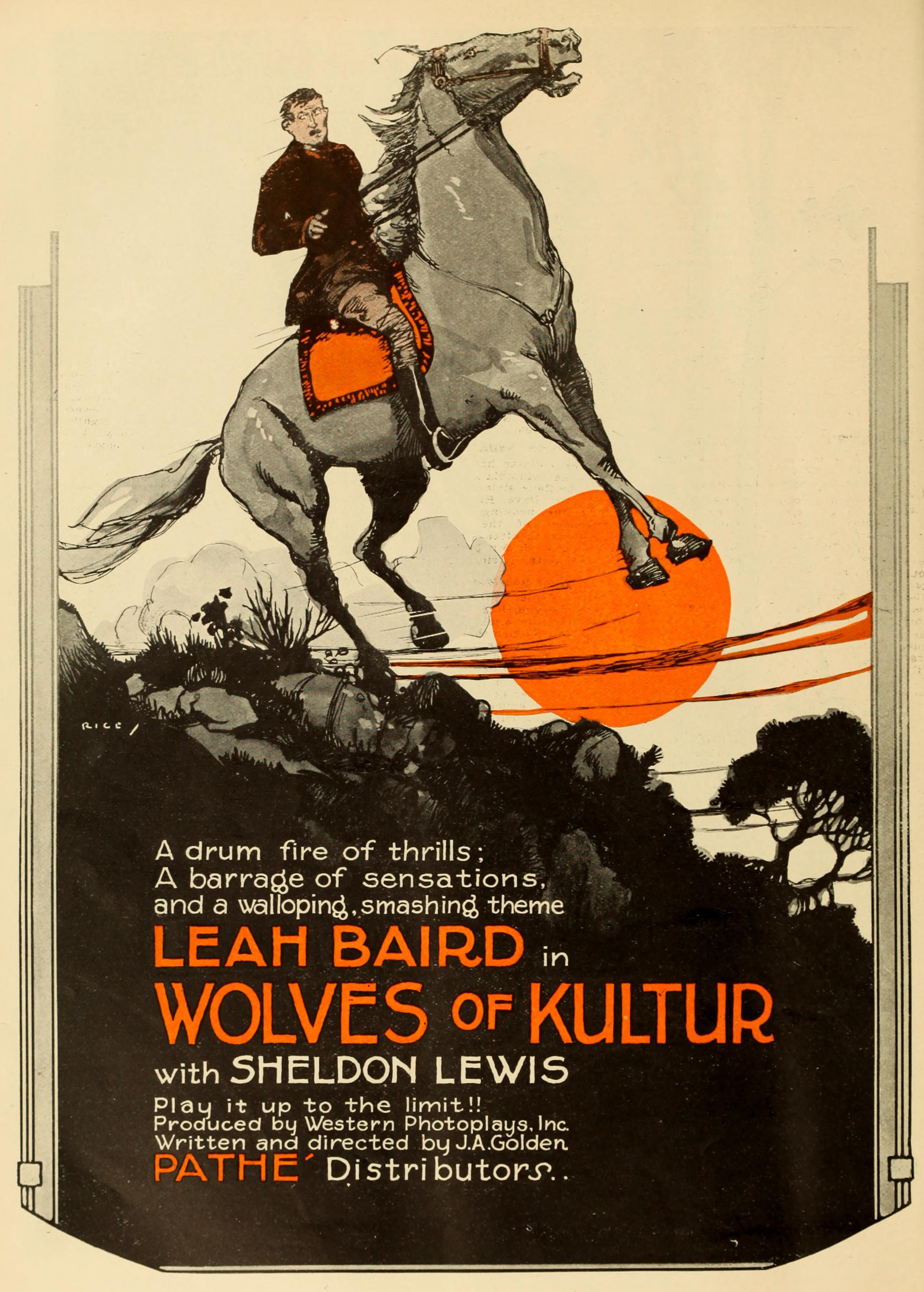
- Directed by: Joseph A. Golden
- Written by: Joseph A. Golden
- Starring: Leah Baird, Charles Hutchison
- Distributed by: Western Photoplays/Pathé
- Release date: October 13, 1918
- Running time: 15 episodes
- Country: United States
- Languages: Silent; English intertitles

Wolves of Kultur is a 1918 adventure film serial directed by Joseph A. Golden. It was Charles Hutchison's first serial and though he was the second lead, the film made him a star. Originally 15 chapters, it survives today only in an edited 7 chapter version, cut to showcase Hutchison's stunt work. The story has a war preparedness theme as an unnamed foreign power threatens America's security.

== Cast ==
- Leah Baird as Alice Grayson
- Charles Hutchison as Bob Moore
- Sheldon Lewis
- Betty Howe as Helen Moore
- Mary Hull as Marie Zaremba
- Edmund D'Alby as Mario Zaremba
- Austin Webb as Henry Hartman
- William Cavanaugh
- Fredrick Arthur
- Karl Dane
- Edwin Denison

== Chapter Titles ==
1. The Torture Trap
2. The Iron Chair
3. Trapping the Traitors
4. The Ride to Death
5. Through the Flames
6. Trails of Treachery
7. The Leap of Despair
8. In the Hands of the Hun
9. The Precipice of Death
10. When Woman Wars
11. Betwixt Heaven and Earth
12. The Tower of Tears
13. The Hun's Hell Trap
14. The Code of Hate
15. The Reward of Patriotism

== See also ==
- List of film serials
- List of film serials by studio

== Sources ==
- Lahue, Kalton C., Continued Next Week: A History of the Moving Picture Serial, 1964, University of Oklahoma Press
- Rainey, Buck, Serials and Series, a World Filmography, 1912–1956, 1999, McFarland & Co., Inc.
