= The Better Woman (film) =

1915 film

- Directed by: Joseph A. Golden
- Written by: Richard Campbell (scenario)
- Produced by: Triumph Films
- Starring: Lenore Ulric; Lowell Sherman
- Distributed by: Equitable Motion Pictures Corporation
- Release date: November 1, 1915
- Running time: 5 reels
- Country: USA
- Language: Silent (English intertitles)

The Better Woman is a lost 1915 American silent film drama directed by Joseph A. Golden, and starring Lenore Ulric and Lowell Sherman.

== Cast ==
- Lenore Ulric – Kate Tripler
- Edith Thornton – Aline Webster
- Lowell Sherman – Frank Barclay
- Ben Graham – Pop Tripler
- Charles Hutchison – Jim Travers
- Will Browning – Bill Carlin
