= Jack Natteford =

American screenwriter

- Born: John Francis Natteford; November 27, 1894; Wahoo, Nebraska, USA
- Died: January 7, 1970 (aged 75); Los Angeles, California, USA
- Occupation: Screenwriter
- Years active: 1921–1967
- Spouse: Luci Ward

Jack Natteford (November 27, 1894 – January 7, 1970) was an American screenwriter. He wrote for more than 140 films between 1921 and 1967. He was born in Wahoo, Nebraska and died in Los Angeles County, California. He was married to fellow screenwriter Luci Ward.

== Selected filmography ==
- Cyclone Jones (1923)
- The Virgin (1924)
- On Probation (1924)
- Soiled (1925)
- Fair Play (1925)
- Wild West (1925)
- The Verdict (1925)
- The Call of the Klondike (1926)
- Moran of the Mounted (1926)
- The Last Alarm (1926)
- Sin Cargo (1926)
- The Tired Business Man (1927)
- The Broken Gate (1927)
- The Beauty Shoppers (1927)
- Backstage (1927)
- Hidden Aces (1927)
- Lightning (1927)
- The Ladybird (1927)
- Streets of Shanghai (1927)
- The Man in Hobbles (1928)
- Ladies of the Night Club (1928)
- Beautiful But Dumb (1928)
- The Gun Runner (1928)
- Lingerie (1928)
- Untamed Justice (1929)
- Border Romance (1929)
- Dark Skies (1929)
- New Orleans (1929)
- Two Men and a Maid (1929)
- The Lost Zeppelin (1929, under birth name of "John Francis Natteford")
- Troopers Three (1930)
- The Thoroughbred (1930)
- Wild Horse (1931)
- Two Gun Man (1931)
- Women Men Marry (1931)
- A Private Scandal (1931)
- File 113 (1932)
- The Last of the Mohicans (1932)
- His Private Secretary (1933)
- Fargo Express (1933)
- Neighbors' Wives (1933)
- House of Danger (1934)
- The Brand of Hate (1934)
- 1,000 Dollars a Minute (1935)
- The Lonely Trail (1936)
- The Oregon Trail (1936)
- Ticket to Paradise (1936)
- Heroes of the Hills (1938)
- Come On, Rangers (1938)
- Heroes of the Saddle (1940)
- Pioneers of the West (1940)
- Double Trouble (1941)
- Black Bart (1948)
- Return of the Bad Men (1948)
- Rustlers (1949)
- The Last Bandit (1949)
- Cattle Drive (1951)
- East of Sumatra (1953)
- The Night the World Exploded (1957)
