= Charles Hutchison =

American actor (1879–1949)

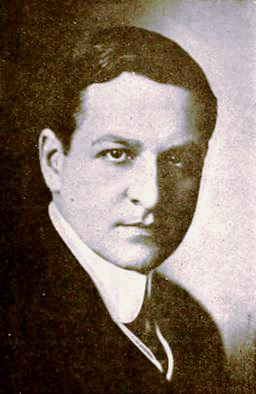
- Photo of Hutchison in Moving Picture World (1919)
- Born: 1879 or 1880; Pittsburgh, Pennsylvania
- Died: May 30, 1949 (aged 69) or May 30, 1949 (aged 68); Hollywood, California
- Occupations: Actor; Film director Screenwriter
- Years active: 1914-1944
- Spouse: Edith Thornton

Charles Hutchison (1879 or 1880 – May 30, 1949) was an American film actor, director and screenwriter. He appeared in more than 40 films between 1914 and 1944. He also directed 33 films between 1915 and 1938.

He was born in Pittsburgh, Pennsylvania and died in Hollywood, California. He married Edith Thornton in 1918.

He is best remembered as Pathé's leading male serial star from 1918 to 1922. During his time with Pathé, he was promoted with the nickname "Hutch" and also billed as "The Thrill-A-Minute Stunt King."

Hutchison convinced co-worker Karl Dane to return to acting in films during the mid-1920s.

In 1919, Hutchison was injured while shooting exterior scenes for the serial The Great Gamble in Chattanooga, Tennessee. While galloping down a steep hill, his horse lost its footing, causing Hutchison to fall head-first onto a rock; he was knocked unconscious. Hutchison had "slight internal injuries" and required several days of complete rest. Filming resumed after his recovery.

In 1923 he went to Britain and made two films Hutch Stirs 'em Up and Hurricane Hutch in Many Adventures for the Ideal Film Company. He made one last serial in 1926, Lightning Hutch, for distribution by the Arrow Film Corporation. It was meant to be a comeback vehicle, but the production company went into bankruptcy just as it was released.

== Serials of Charles Hutchison ==
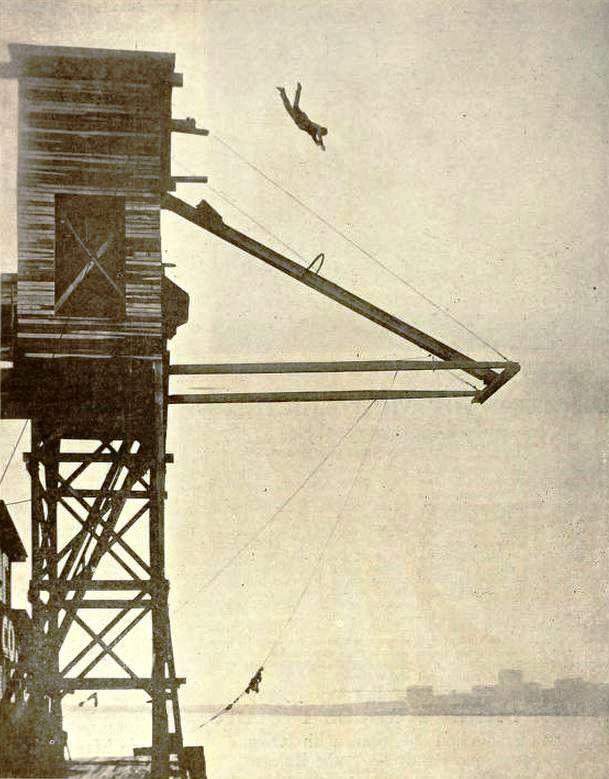
Hutchison made this dive for The Great Gamble (1919)

- Wolves of Kultur (1918)
- The Great Gamble (1919)
- The Whirlwind (1920)
- Double Adventure (1921)
- Hurricane Hutch (1921)
- Go Get 'Em Hutch (1922)
- Speed (1922)
- Hutch Stirs 'em Up (1923)
- Hurricane Hutch in Many Adventures (1924)
- Was It Bigamy? (1925)
- Lightning Hutch (1926)

== Selected filmography ==
=== Actor ===
- The Wayward Son (1914)
- The Better Woman (1915)
- War Brides (1916)
- The Golden God (1917)
- Hutch Stirs 'em Up (1923)
- Hurricane Hutch in Many Adventures (1924)
- Turned Up (1924)
- The Hidden Menace (1925)
- Pirates of the Sky (1926)
- The Trunk Mystery (1926)
- Hidden Aces (1927)

Director

- On Probation (1924)
- Hurricane Hutch in Many Adventures (1924)
- The Hidden Menace (1925)
- The Winning Wallop (1926)
- The Smoke Eaters (1926)
- The Little Firebrand (1926)
- Flying High (1926)
- The Down Grade (1927)
- When Danger Calls (1927)
- Catch-As-Catch-Can (1927)
- Bitter Sweets (1928)
- Out with the Tide (1928)
- Women Men Marry (1931)
- A Private Scandal (1931)
- Found Alive (1933)
- House of Danger (1934)
- The Judgement Book (1935)
- On Probation (1935)
- Circus Shadows (1935)
- Riddle Ranch (1935)
- Desert Guns (1936)
- Night Cargo (1936)
- Phantom Patrol (1936)
- Born to Fight (1936)
