= Babbie =

Babbie may refer to:

- Babbie, wooden cill protector in a canal lock; see Lock (water transport)
- Babbie, Alabama, town in Covington County, Alabama, United States
- Babbie Mason (born 1955), American singer and songwriter
- Earl Babbie (born 1938), American sociologist
- Lady Babbie, 1913 silent film
