= The Drug Traffic =

1923 film

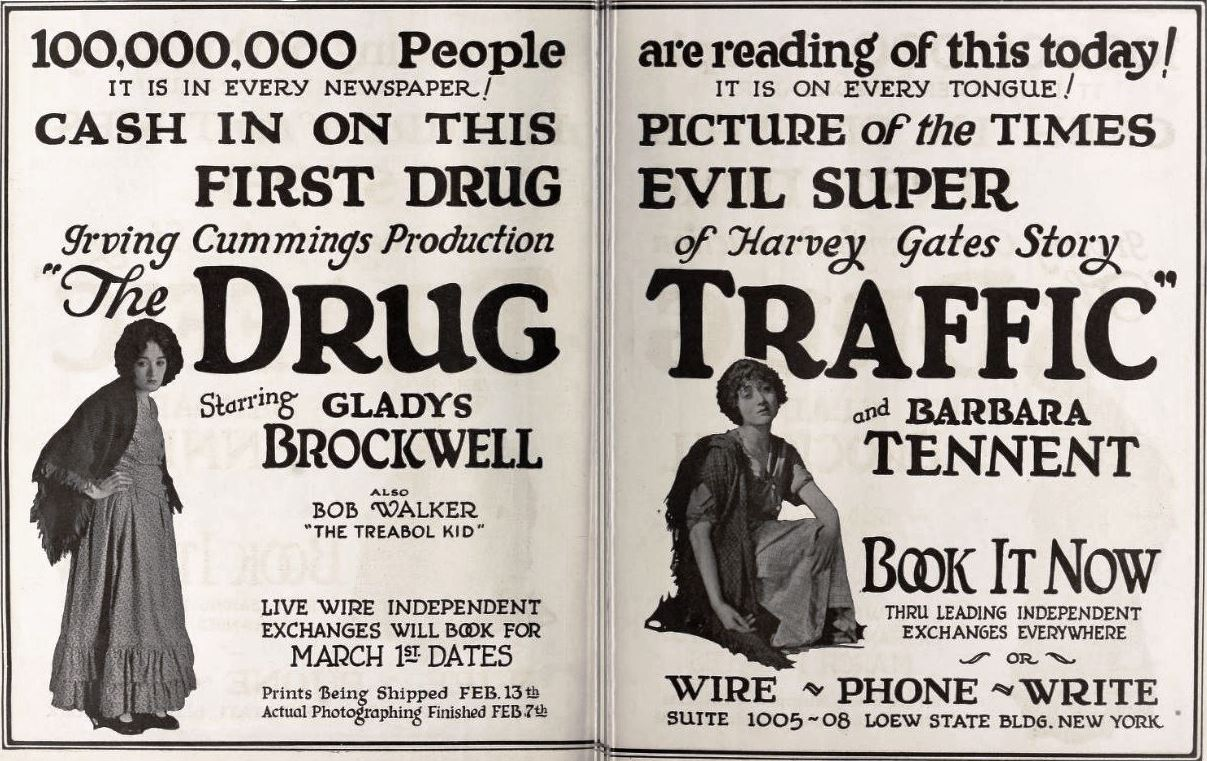
- Directed by: Irving Cummings
- Written by: Harvey Gates
- Produced by: Sol Lesser; Irving Cummings
- Starring: Robert Walker; Gladys Brockwell; Barbara Tennant
- Production company: Irving Cummings Productions
- Distributed by: Principal Pictures
- Release date: March 1923
- Running time: 50 minutes
- Country: United States
- Languages: Silent; English intertitles

The Drug Traffic is a 1923 American silent crime drama film directed by Irving Cummings and starring Robert Walker, Gladys Brockwell and Barbara Tennant. It was produced independently and released on a state-by-state basis.

== Synopsis ==
A successful surgeon, weary due to his long and stressful days, starts taking shots of drugs to pep him up. Before long he is an addict and his career and personal life collapse.

== Cast ==
- Robert Walker as Willie Shade
- Gladys Brockwell as Edna Moore
- Barbara Tennant as Mary Larkin
- Ben Hewlett as Harry

== Bibliography ==
- Connelly, Robert B. The Silents: Silent Feature Films, 1910-36, Volume 40, Issue 2. December Press, 1998.
- Munden, Kenneth White. The American Film Institute Catalog of Motion Pictures Produced in the United States, Part 1. University of California Press, 1997.
