= What Love Will Do =

1921 film

- Directed by: William K. Howard
- Written by: John Stone; Gordon Rigby
- Produced by: William Fox
- Starring: Edna Murphy; Johnnie Walker; Barbara Tennant
- Cinematography: Victor Milner
- Production company: Fox Film Corporation
- Distributed by: Fox Film Corporation
- Release date: September 11, 1921
- Running time: 50 minutes
- Country: United States
- Languages: Silent; English intertitles

What Love Will Do is a 1921 American silent drama film directed by William K. Howard and starring Edna Murphy, Johnnie Walker and Barbara Tennant.

== Cast ==
- Edna Murphy as Mary Douglas
- Johnnie Walker as Johnny Rowan
- Glen Cavender as Abner Rowan
- Barbara Tennant as Goldie Rowan
- Richard Tucker as Herbert Dawson
- Edwin B. Tilton as Reverend Douglas

== Bibliography ==
- Connelly, Robert B. The Silents: Silent Feature Films, 1910-36, Volume 40, Issue 2. December Press, 1998.
- Munden, Kenneth White. The American Film Institute Catalog of Motion Pictures Produced in the United States, Part 1. University of California Press, 1997.
- Solomon, Aubrey. The Fox Film Corporation, 1915-1935: A History and Filmography. McFarland, 2011.
