= Lady Babbie =

1913 American film

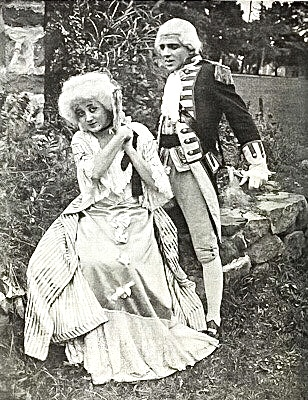
- Film still of Lady Babbie (Tennant) and Lieutenant Byron (Lund)
- Directed by: Oscar A. C. Lund
- Screenplay by: Oscar A. C. Lund
- Based on: Title character's name adopted from the 1897 Broadway play The Little Minister based on 1891 novel by J. M. Barrie
- Starring: Barbara Tennant, Oscar A. C. Lund
- Production company: Eclair American
- Distributed by: Universal Film Manufacturing Company
- Release date: November 12, 1913
- Running time: 30–38 minutes (3 reels; approximately 3,000 feet)
- Country: United States
- Languages: Silent, English intertitles

Lady Babbie is a lost 1913 American silent drama film produced by the United States division of the French film company Eclair. The featurette was written and directed by Oscar A. C. Lund, a native of Sweden, who also costarred in the three-reeler opposite Barbara Tennant as Lady Babbie. That role was loosely based on a popular character originally performed by American actress Maude Adams in the 1897 Broadway production The Little Minister, a play adapted from the 1891 novel of the same title by Scottish writer J. M. Barrie. Filming for this motion picture was done at Eclair's studio facilities in Fort Lee, New Jersey and on location at Lake George, New York.

No full copies or partial reels of this "photoplay" are preserved in film archives in either the United States, Canada, or Europe. Lady Babbie is therefore presumed to be a lost film. All of the featurette's master negatives and undistributed print copies were most likely consumed in the fire that destroyed Eclair's negative department and the contents of its film storage vaults in Fort Lee on March 19, 1914, just a few months after this production's release.

== Plot ==
The film's storyline was set in the colonial period of the United States in the early 1770s. Reviews and plot summaries of the featurette published in late 1913 and 1914 describe the portrayal of a romance set within a province marked by public opposition to the local government. The story involves Lord Primton (Frederick C. Truesdell), an important landowner who lives on his estate with his widowed sister (Julia Stewart) and her niece, Lady Babbie (Barbara Tennant). The nobleman despises a new, exorbitant tax levied on citizens by Governor Dunmore. To gather allies to discuss a plan of action against the tax, Primton invites his friends to a lawn party, hoping such a common social event will not arouse the suspicions of government officials. At the party a young British officer, Lieutenant Byron, meets Lady Babbie and falls immediately and deeply in love with the beautiful woman. Their obvious attraction for one another is resented by her fiancé, who is an army officer as well. Rising jealousies soon prompt the fiancé to challenge Byron to a duel. When Babbie learns of the challenge, which is to take place at midnight at a nearby crossroads, she tries to stop it. She disguises herself in men's clothing, goes to Byron, and pleads with him not to fight. Her fiancé finds them together again, becomes furious, and draws his sword. Byron counters with his own sword, and in the ensuing clash he kills the fellow officer.

While the romancing of Lady Babbie and the deadly confrontation were occurring, Lord Primton sent his son to England to seek the king's assistance in overturning the unfair tax and to investigate the province's corrupt administration. Governor Dunmore becomes aware of those efforts, so he plots to destroy the elder Primton. After Byron is arrested for murder and sentenced to be hung, Dunmore offers him a chance to avoid execution if he agrees to find Primton, now in hiding, and bring him alive to the governor's office. The lieutenant agrees, although he is still unaware that Primton is related to Lady Babbie. Byron now searches for months but cannot locate the fugitive. He returns again to Primton's largely deserted estate, where Lady Babbie continues to reside. She entertains him there, but when she discovers Byron searching a room for clues to Primton's whereabouts, she accuses him of spying for the governor. Angered, she physically assaults Byron, but he quickly departs before either he or she is injured. Primton's son now arrives from his voyage with letters of support and instructions from the king. Dunmore now concedes, admitting defeat. Meanwhile, Byron is being held in the provincial prison, where preparations are under way to hang him after he failed in his mission for Dunmore. Lady Babbie finally learns why Byron was compelled to search for Lord Primton, and she rushes to the prison with orders to halt the execution and to pardon and release the soldier. Byron is saved, and she announces that they can now be married. The story ends with the happy couple "wrapped in love's embrace."

== Cast ==
- Barbara Tennant as Lady Babbie
- Oscar A. C. Lund as Lieutenant Byron
- Frederick C. Truesdell as Lord Primton
- Louis R. Grisel as Governor Dumore
- Julia Stuart as Lord Primton's sister
- Unidentified actor as Lady Babbie's fiancé
- Unidentified actor as Lord Primton's son

== Production ==
O. A. C. Lund's decisions to write a screenplay and then direct a film titled Lady Babbie proved timely in 1913, for other productions in the United States featuring the character were being presented in both stage revivals and on screen. The theatrical role of "Lady Babbie" dates to 1897, to the long-running Broadway play The Little Minister, a production based on the 1891 novel of the same title by Scottish novelist and playwright J. M. Barrie. That Broadway adaptation transformed the novel into a comedy, and it starred legendary American actress Maude Adams, whose 300 performances as Lady Babbie during the 1897-1898 season popularized the character to "packed houses". Over the years Adams' stage success inspired many additional productions of Barrie's work. In January 1913, yet another adaptation of The Little Minister opened, although this time as a motion picture produced by Vitagraph Studios. Also between 1912 and 1914, revivals of the play showcasing Lady Babbie were being presented in London and across the United States on stages in Chicago, Atlanta, Cincinnati, Detroit, Washington, D.C., and in many other cities. Lund's Lady Babbie, however, reflected in no way the content of The Little Minister, neither in its portrayal of "the capricious heroine" Lady Babbie in the play The Little Minister nor in the geographical and chronological settings in which Barrie's novel is set, in a remote village in Scotland in the 1840s. It therefore appears that Lund simply hoped his film could profit, at least in part, from the name recognition, literary history, and long-standing popularity of stage productions associated with the title he applied to his script or "scenario".

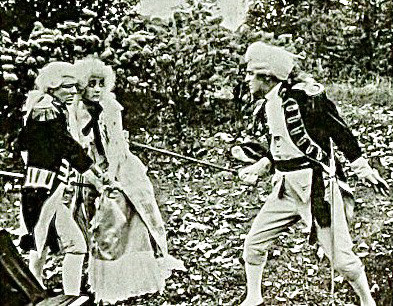
One of the scenes filmed at Lake George, New York: Lady Babbie's fiancé confronts her and Lieutenant Byron

Filming of Eclair's Lady Babbie was done in September and early October 1913, with interior scenes shot at the company's two-year-old studio facilities in Fort Lee, New Jersey and most outdoor footage taken on location at Lake George, New York. Given that location's 200-mile distance from Fort Lee, Eclair sought to save production time and expenses by combining needed camerawork in a single outing and shooting scenes at Lake George for "several scenarios" or different upcoming films described to be "English and Colonial in character". Those films, according to a 1913 news item in The Motion Picture News, included scenes with Barbara Tennant, O. A. C. Lund, Julia Stewart, and various other "beautiful, quaintly gowned young women and handsome young men, garbed in costumes of bold sir knights and the scarlet coated uniforms of the English army in Colonial days."

== Release and reception ==
The film's copyright registration (LU1410) is dated October 17, 1913 with release charts in trade publications showing that the featurette was released on November 12, less than a month after its registration. Available copies of trade publications and daily newspapers from late 1913 and 1914 carry few reviews of the film. The New York-based trade journal The Moving Picture World provides its reaction to the film in the publication's November 22, 1913 issue. While giving Lady Babbie high marks for its performances, costumes, and cinematography, the journal found the release's overall screenplay somewhat muddled:

This is a rather elaborate three-reel production; its atmosphere in colonial days, the principal characters, including a governor of one of the provinces and his political enemies, and its theme, derived from the adventuresome, mettlesome qualities of Lady Babbie are well rendered by Miss Barbara Tennant, and the equally daring and adventurous Lord [Byron], her lover. The story is not quite so clear as we should like to have it, but the costumes are very pretty and we like the color. The photography is commendable.

Most newspapers made only brief announcements about screenings of the Eclair release at their local theaters. In Florida in its January 27, 1914 edition, the St. Peterburg Daily Times in a short notice simply informs its readers about the film offerings that night at the "Airdome" cinema: "Barbara Tenent [sic] in Lady Babbie 3 reels, and 3 other strong reels, 6 reels in all; regular prices 5c and 10c." The Arizona Republican in Phoenix was one of the newspapers that assessed the film. "It is seldom", writes the paper's anonymous reviewer in May 1914, "that any moving picture house is accorded the opportunity to present a photo-play equal to 'Lady Babbie,' the Eclair three-reel drama, featured today at the Regale theater". The reviewer adds, "It is a romantic, colonial play, a costume production, and for richness, accuracy of settings and costuming and romantic atmosphere is superior to anything ever done by the Universal-Eclair company.

== "Lost" film status ==
No copies of the featurette are preserved in major film archives in either the United States, Canada, or Europe. All the undistributed print copies, master negatives, and other footage of Lady Babbie were very likely among the catastrophic losses suffered by Eclair when a fire destroyed the company's entire negative department and storage vaults in Fort Lee on March 19, 1914, just four months after the three-reeler's release. The fate of copies distributed to theaters prior to the fire is also unknown. It is probable that any footage from used reels that were returned to Eclair disintegrated over time like the vast majority of motion pictures produced in the silent era, falling victim to the highly unstable nitrate-based film stock on which they were printed.

The film's United States copyright registration can be found in a reference published by the Library of Congress in 1951, the Catalog of Copyright Entries: Motion Pictures, 1912–1939, which contains information relating to over 51,000 shorts, feature films, and newsreels produced during the cited period. The entry for Lady Babbie shows that among the documentation submitted in 1913 by Eclair for its copyright were 94 photographic images that were printed from the featurette's master negatives.

== See also ==
- List of lost films
- List of Swedish film directors
