= Shadows of Conscience =

1921 film

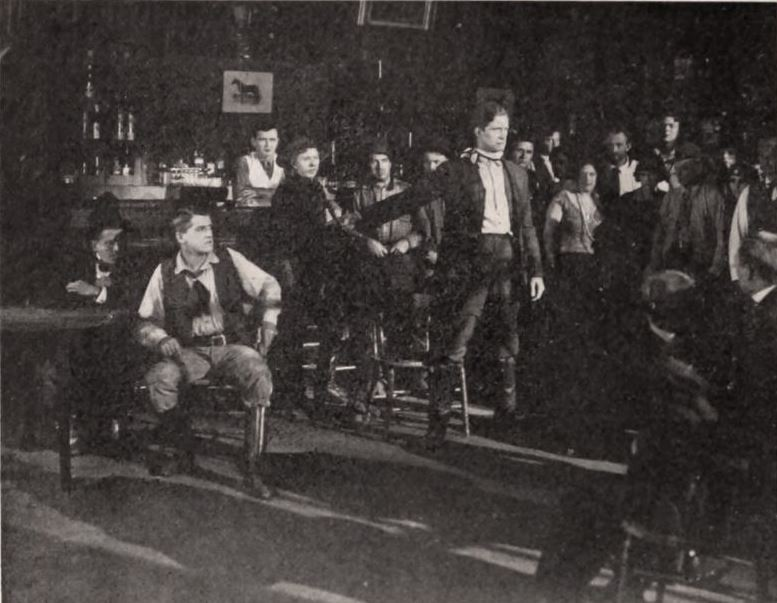
- Directed by: John P. McCarthy
- Written by: H. Landers Jackson; John P. McCarthy; Francis Powers
- Starring: Russell Simpson; Barbara Tennant; Gertrude Olmstead
- Cinematography: Victor Milner
- Edited by: Fred Allen
- Production company: Russell Productions
- Distributed by: Russell Productions
- Release date: October 16, 1921
- Running time: 70 minutes
- Country: United States
- Languages: Silent; English intertitles

Shadows of Conscience is a 1921 American silent Western film directed by John P. McCarthy and starring Russell Simpson, Barbara Tennant and Gertrude Olmstead.

== Cast ==
- Russell Simpson as Jim Logan
- Landers Stevens as Wade Curry
- Barbara Tennant as Alice
- Bradley Ward as Pedro (the halfbreed)
- Nelson McDowell as Wesley Coburn
- Edward Cooper as Judson Craft
- Ida Mae McKenzie as Winnie Coburn
- Fred Burns as Sheriff Bowers
- Gertrude Olmstead as Winifred Coburn

preservation status.

shadows of conscience is the first surviving film produced by Francis Powers. All of his films made before shadows of conscience are collectively considered lost.

== Bibliography ==
- Connelly, Robert B. The Silents: Silent Feature Films, 1910-36, Volume 40, Issue 2. December Press, 1998.
- Munden, Kenneth White. The American Film Institute Catalog of Motion Pictures Produced in the United States, Part 1. University of California Press, 1997.
