= Hidden Aces =

1927 film

- Directed by: Howard M. Mitchell
- Written by: Jack Natteford
- Produced by: Louis T. Rogers
- Starring: Charles Hutchison; Alice Calhoun; Barbara Tennant
- Cinematography: Leon Shamroy
- Production company: Louis T. Rogers Productions
- Distributed by: Pathe Exchange
- Release date: August 7, 1927
- Running time: 62 minutes
- Country: United States
- Languages: Silent; English intertitles

Hidden Aces is a 1927 American silent action film directed by Howard M. Mitchell and starring Charles Hutchison, Alice Calhoun and Barbara Tennant.

When an exiled White Russian Princess arrived in the United States several different people plot to relieve her of her valuable jewels.

== Cast ==
- Charles Hutchison as Larry Hutchdale
- Alice Calhoun as Natalie Knowles
- Barbara Tennant as Princess Orloff
- Paul Weigel as Serge Demidoff
- Harry Norcross as Burke
- James Bradbury Jr. as Butler
- Frank Whitson as Captain

== Bibliography ==
- Munden, Kenneth White. The American Film Institute Catalog of Motion Pictures Produced in the United States, Part 1. University of California Press, 1997.
