= For Woman's Favor =

1924 film

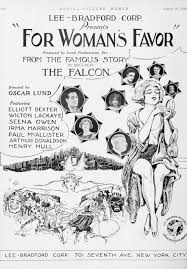
- Directed by: O. A. C. Lund
- Written by: Giovanni Boccaccio
- Produced by: O. A. C. Lund
- Starring: Seena Owen
- Cinematography: Marcel le Picard; Robert A. Olssen
- Production company: Lund Productions
- Distributed by: Lee-Bradford Corporation
- Release date: August 1, 1924
- Running time: 6 reels
- Country: United States
- Language: Silent (English intertitles)

For Woman's Favor is a 1924 American silent drama film directed by O. A. C. Lund and starring Seena Owen and Henry Hull.

== Plot ==
As described in a film magazine review, Howard Fiske finds himself penniless and disillusioned and deserted by June Paige, the woman he loves. His friend turns wolf and hounds him for money, demanding that he blackmail the young woman. The young man happens to read the book The Falcon, whose plot resembles his life, and reads how the lover sacrifices all for the woman he loves. When June comes to obtain her letters, the hero gives them to her despite the remonstrances of his friend. June realizes the bigness of his nature and that she still loves him.

== Cast ==
- Seena Owen as June Paige
- Elliott Dexter as Howard Fiske
- Wilton Lackaye as Bracken
- Irma Harrison as The Lamb
- Henry Hull as The Fool / The Lover
- Paul McAllister as The Wolf
- Arthur Donaldson as The Brother

== Preservation ==
With no prints of For Woman's Favor located in any film archives, it is a lost film.
