= When Broadway Was a Trail =

- Advertisement for the film
- Directed by: Oscar A. C. Lund
- Screenplay by: Oscar A. C. Lund
- Starring: Barbara Tennant; Oscar A. C. Lund; Edward Roseman
- Production company: Shubert Film Corporation
- Distributed by: World Film Corporation
- Release date: October 4, 1914
- Running time: 5 reels
- Country: United States
- Language: Silent (English intertitles)

When Broadway Was a Trail is a 1914 historical drama film directed by Oscar A. C. Lund. It was distributed by World Film Corporation.

== Plot ==
The story deals with the coming of Henry Minuet, the son of the governor of New Amsterdam, to Danvers, now Salem, Mass., for the sake of buying grain for the helpless colony that he represents. Accidentally he sees Priscilla Elliott, the daughter of Danvers' physician, and while they do not speak the same language, they love each other from the start. Though Miss Elliott is sought for by Salvation Hibbens, she does not care for him because he is helpless away from his mother's apron strings. Then, too, she cares too much for Henry Minuet, and when her father dies, Salvation's mother tried to force her to marry Salvation through threats, but fails. The mother then makes trouble for Priscilla by having her declared a witch and while she is shunned by Danvers' society, she cares little, because Henry is with her. Finally the both of them are put in prison. A messenger comes from his father to learn what has been his fate. As soon as the governor of Danvers learns the name of the prisoner, he orders him set at liberty, but he has escaped in the meantime. Because of the escape, the mayor informs the Dutch messenger that he will not have anything to do with the colony of New Amsterdam under any circumstances. The soldiers capture Henry, while Priscilla is away. But Henry manages to inform her that it is best that she go and live at his father's house in New Amsterdam. Priscilla obeys, and leaves Henry, who, in the mean time, is released from prison and sent home. On his way to New Amsterdam, he meets Priscilla, who does not feel at home in his father's house, because his parents plan that Henry should marry Gretchen. Seeing that neither in Danvers nor in New Amsterdam could both of them find the peace and happiness that their love entitles them to, so they decide that by themselves, away from their friends they will find the happiness that only true love can give.

== Cast ==
- Barbara Tennant as Priscilla Elliott
- Oscar A. C. Lund as Henry Minuet
- Edward Roseman as Peter Minuet
- Julia Stuart as Mistress Minuet
- Lindsay Hall as Salvation Hibbins
- Mary Navarro as Mistress Hibbins
- Alec B. Francis as Standish Hope
- George Cowl as Iroquois Chief

== Reception ==
A contemporary review in Variety praised the performances of the cast. A contemporary review in the Quad-City Times was similarly positive, praising both the story and the acting.
