= Barbara Tennant =

English actress

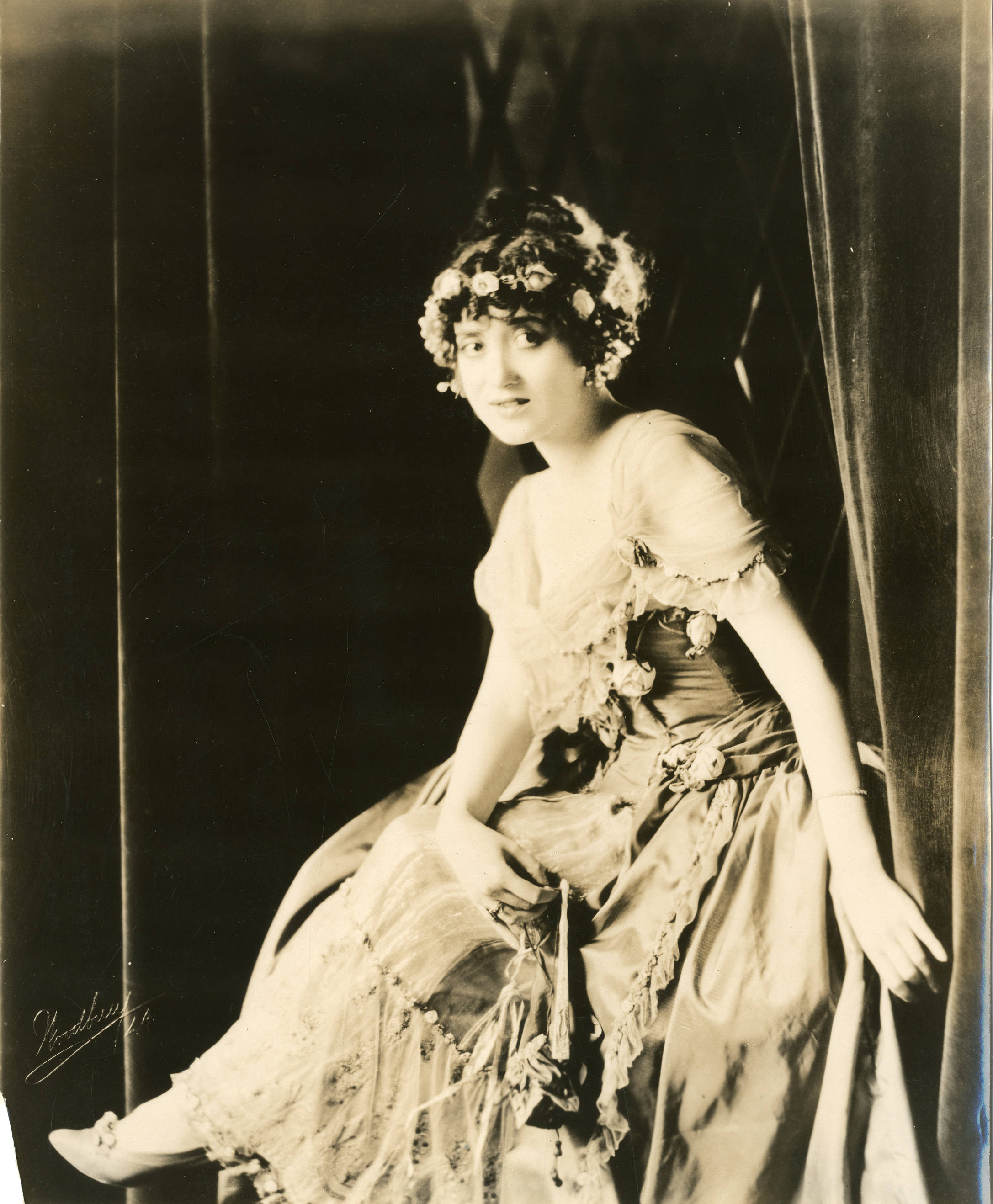
- Tennant in 1922
- Born: 19 May 1892; London, United Kingdom
- Died: 18 March 1982 (aged 89)
- Occupation: Actress
- Years active: 1911–1928

Barbara Tennant (19 May 1892 – 18 March 1982) was an English actress. She appeared in over a hundred silent films between 1912 and 1928.

== Early life ==
Barbara Tennant was born in London, and began performing there. She moved to North America as a young actress and dancer with the Ben Greet company, and lived in Montreal while touring in various theatrical productions.

== Film career ==
Tennant appeared in over a hundred silent films, many of them short productions, between 1912 and 1928. Her first film was Chamber of Forgetfulness (1912), and her last film credit was in A Jim Jam Janitor (1928). Other notable appearances were as Maid Marian in an adaptation of Robin Hood (1912) with Alec B. Francis and George Larkin; in Into the Wilderness (1914) and The Price of Malice (1916), both directed by Oscar A. C. Lund; as the title character in M'Liss (1915), based on a story by Bret Harte; The Better Wife (1919), starring Clara Kimball Young; in Captain January (1924), starring Baby Peggy; and in The Devil Dancer (1927), featuring Anna May Wong.

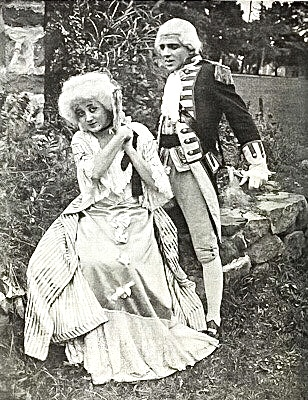
Still of Barbara Tennant and O. A. C. Lund in Lady Babbie

Tennant worked at Eclair Studios in Fort Lee, New Jersey, between 1911 and 1915. By 1919, she was based in Los Angeles, working with producer Jesse Hampton. She was ill for a few years, effectively ending her career momentum, though she made a comeback in 1922, and she appeared in films as late as 1931. "I love it all so," she explained. "I can't leave it."

== Films in the news ==
Tennant was in one of the first films rejected by the British Board of Film Classification in 1913, when she starred as the Virgin Mary in The Crimson Cross, apparently violating rules about the depiction of religious figures.

In 2011, the Russian government presented ten American silent films, previously considered lost, to the Library of Congress. One of those films, Circus Days (1923), starred Tennant and Jackie Coogan.

== Partial filmography ==
- Robin Hood (1912)
- Lady Babbie (1913)
- When Broadway Was a Trail (1914)
- The Closed Road (1916)
- What Every Woman Wants (1919)
- The Better Wife (1919)
- Shadows of Conscience (1921)
- What Love Will Do (1921)
- Wolves of the North (1921)
- The Golden Gallows (1922)
- The Infidel (1922)
- The Masquerader (1922)
- Bulldog Courage (1922)
- The Love Gambler (1922)
- Thelma (1922)
- Deserted at the Altar (1922)
- The Drug Traffic (1923)
- Circus Days (1923)
- The Old Fool (1923)
- Poisoned Paradise: The Forbidden Story of Monte Carlo (1924)
- Captain January (1924)
- The House of Youth (1924)
- The Street of Tears (1924)
- You Can't Get Away with It (1924)
- Daddy's Gone A-Hunting (1925)
- Borrowed Finery (1925)
- The Midnight Flyer (1925)
- Hearts and Spangles (1926)
- Her Sacrifice (1926)
- The Wreck (1927)
- Your Wife and Mine (1927)
- Hidden Aces (1927)
- The Clown (1927)
- The Devil Dancer (1927)
- Possessed (1931)
