= List of Swedish film directors =

This is a list of Swedish film directors. It includes some foreign-born film directors who have worked in Sweden.

== A ==
- Lasse Åberg
- Mac Ahlberg
- Per Åhlin
- Marianne Ahrne
- Jonas Åkerlund
- Milad Alami
- Daniel Alfredson
- Hans Alfredson
- Tomas Alfredson
- Roy Andersson

== B ==
- Anders Banke
- Daniel Bergman
- Eva Bergman
- Ingmar Bergman

== C ==
- Nils Olaf Chrisander
- Peter Cohen

== D ==
- Tage Danielsson

== E ==
- Gustaf Edgren
- Anders Edström (born 1966)
- Viking Eggeling
- Lena Einhorn
- Hasse Ekman
- Marie-Louise Ekman
- Daniel Espinosa

== F ==
- Josef Fares
- Daniel Fridell

== G ==
- Kjell Grede

== H ==
- Mikael Håfström
- Lasse Hallström
- Geir Hansteen Jörgensen
- Klaus Härö
- Olle Hellbom
- Richard Hobert
- Anna Hofman-Uddgren

== J ==
- Stefan Jarl

== L ==
- Daniel Lind Lagerlöf
- Ella Lemhagen
- Gunnel Lindblom
- Lars-Magnus Lindgren
- Ebba Lindkvist (1882–1942), Sweden's first female film director
- Oscar A.C. Lund

== M ==
- Ulf Malmros
- Arne Mattsson
- Gustaf Molander
- Lukas Moodysson

== N ==
- Colin Nutley
- Sven Nykvist

== O ==
- Stig Olin
- Vladimir Oravsky
- Ruben Östlund

== P ==
- Reza Parsa
- Kay Pollak

== R ==
- Björn Runge

== S ==
- Alf Sjöberg
- Vilgot Sjöman
- Victor Sjöström
- Johan Söderberg
- Kristofer Steen
- Mauritz Stiller
- Arne Sucksdorff
- Kjell Sundvall

== T ==
- Filip Tegstedt
- Jan Troell

== V ==
- Bo Arne Vibenius

== W ==
- Maj Wechselmann
- Bo Widerberg

== Z ==
- Mai Zetterling

== See also ==
- Cinema of Sweden
