= Oscar A. C. Lund =

Swedish-born American film director (1885–1963)

- Born: Oskar August Konstantin Lund; May 21, 1885; Gothenburg, Sweden
- Died: May 2, 1963 (aged 77)
- Burial place: Skogskyrkogården, Stockholm
- Occupations: actor, screenwriter and director
- Known for: silent films

Oscar Augustus Constantine Lund (May 21, 1885 – May 2, 1963) was a Swedish-born silent film actor, screenwriter and director of the American and Swedish motion picture industry.

== Early life ==
Oscar A. C. Lund was born May 21, 1885, in Gothenburg, Sweden, the son of Swedish actor and theater director Carl Ludvig Lund (1858–1893). He emigrated in 1900 to the United States.

== Career ==
Lund joined the burgeoning motion picture industry, directing his first film in 1912 titled The Wager. The following year, Lund filmed The Great Unknown in Canada.

Lund also wrote the screenplay as well as acted in many of the films he directed. In 1917 he wrote Mother Love and the Law based on a real life child-custody case in Illinois.

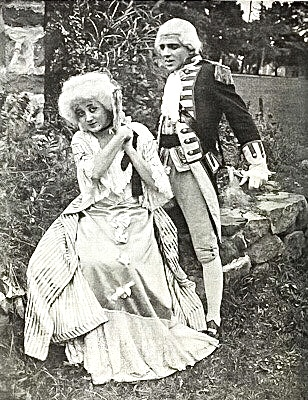
Still of Barbara Tennant and Lund in Lady Babbie

Between 1912 and 1924, Lund directed more than 60 films in the United States. These included the first feature film made by the New Jersey–based U.S. division of the French Éclair Film Company in 1914 titled Into the Wilderness. He was a director and writer for Together (1918), The Nature Girl (1918) and Peg of the Pirates (1918). He frequently worked with director and screenwriter B. A. Rolfe (1879–1956) and with the British actress Barbara Tennant (1892–1982), directing her in more than half a dozen films.

Lund was a member of the New York brank of the Motion Picture Directors Association and served as Outer Guard in 1922.

Lund returned to Sweden in 1931, and to filmmaking, directing his first and only talkie, a Swedish language film titled Kärlek och dynamit (1933).

Lund died May 2, 1963.

== Selected filmography ==
- Lady Babbie (1913)
- The Sons of a Soldier (1913)
- When Broadway Was a Trail (1914)
- Her New York (1917)
- For Woman's Favor (1924)
- Kärlek och dynamit (Love and Dynamite) (1933)
