= List of American films of 1926 =

American films released in 1926

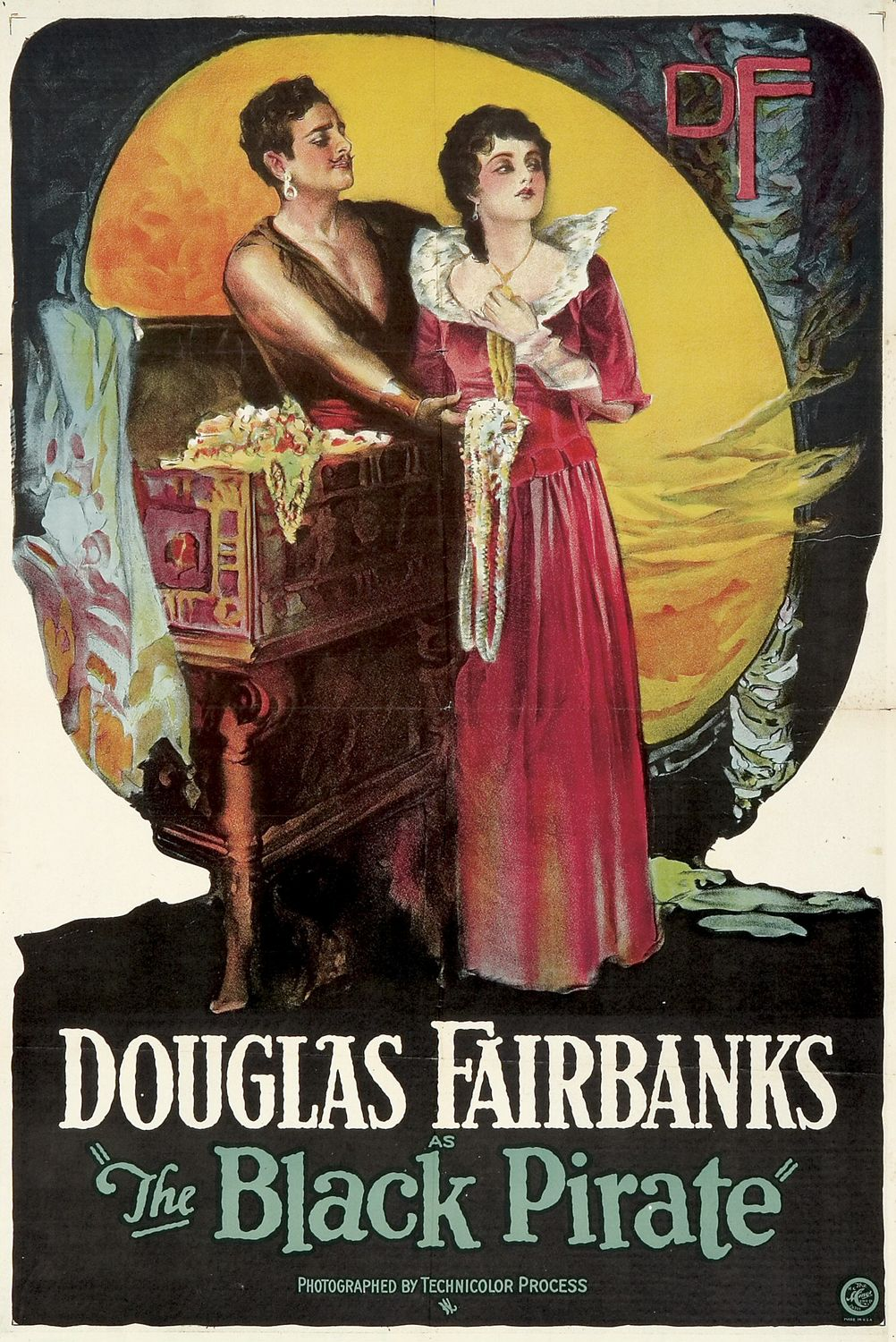
The Black Pirate starring Douglas Fairbanks.

American feature-length motion pictures released in 1926 number at least 740.

== A ==
Title	Director	Featured Cast	Genre	Note
3 Bad Men	John Ford	George O'Brien, Olive Borden	Western	Fox Film
30 Below Zero	Lambert Hillyer	Buck Jones, Eva Novak, Paul Panzer	Drama	Fox Film
Ace of Action	William Bertram	Hal Taliaferro, Alma Rayford	Western	Independent
The Ace of Cads	Luther Reed	Adolphe Menjou, Alice Joyce	Romance	Paramount
Across the Pacific	Roy Del Ruth	Monte Blue, Jane Winton, Myrna Loy	Adventure	Warner Bros.
The Adorable Deceiver	Phil Rosen	Alberta Vaughn, Frank Leigh	Comedy	FBO
Almost a Lady	E. Mason Hopper	Marie Prevost, Harrison Ford, George K. Arthur	Comedy	PDC
Aloma of the South Seas	Charles R. Bowers, Bud Fisher	Gilda Gray, Warner Baxter, Percy Marmont	Comedy	Paramount
The Amateur Gentleman	Sidney Olcott	Richard Barthelmess, Dorothy Dunbar	Historical	First National
The American Venus	Frank Tuttle	Esther Ralston, Edna May Oliver, Louise Brooks	Comedy	Paramount
April Fool	Nat Ross	Duane Thompson, Mary Alden	Comedy	Independent
The Arizona Streak	Robert De Lacey	Tom Tyler, Frankie Darro	Western	FBO
Arizona Sweepstakes	Clifford Smith	Hoot Gibson, Helen Lynch, Philo McCullough	Western	Universal
Atta Boy	Edward H. Griffith	Monty Banks, Virginia Bradford	Comedy	Pathé Exchange
The Auction Block	Hobart Henley	Charles Ray, Eleanor Boardman, Sally O'Neil	Comedy	MGM

== B ==
Title	Director	Featured Cast	Genre	Note
Bachelor Brides	William K. Howard	Rod La Rocque, Eulalie Jensen	Romantic comedy	PDC
Bad Man's Bluff	Alan James	Jay Wilsey, Molly Malone	Western	Independent
The Baited Trap	Stuart Paton	Ben F. Wilson, Neva Gerber	Western	Independent
The Bandit Buster	Richard Thorpe	Buddy Roosevelt, Molly Malone	Western	Rayart
Bardelys the Magnificent	King Vidor	John Gilbert, Eleanor Boardman	Romantic drama	MGM
The Barrier	George W. Hill	Lionel Barrymore, Marceline Day	Drama	MGM
The Bat	Roland West	Tullio Carminati, Jewel Carmen, Louise Fazenda	Mystery, Thriller	United Artists
Battling Butler	Buster Keaton	Buster Keaton, Sally O'Neil	Comedy	MGM
Beau Geste	Herbert Brenon	Ronald Colman, Neil Hamilton	Swashbuckler	Paramount
The Beautiful Cheat	Edward Sloman	Laura La Plante, Harry Myers	Comedy	Universal
Behind the Front	A. Edward Sutherland	Wallace Beery, Raymond Hatton, Mary Brian	War comedy	Paramount
The Belle of Broadway	Harry O. Hoyt	Betty Compson, Herbert Rawlinson	Romance	Columbia
The Bells	James Young	Lionel Barrymore, Caroline Frances Cooke	Crime Thriller	Independent
Bertha, the Sewing Machine Girl	Irving Cummings	Madge Bellamy, Anita Garvin	Drama	Fox Film
The Better Man	Scott R. Dunlap	Richard Talmadge, Ena Gregory	Comedy	FBO
The Better 'Ole	Charles Reisner	Sydney Chaplin, Doris Hill	Comedy	Warner Bros.
The Better Way	Ralph Ince	Dorothy Revier, Ralph Ince	Comedy	Columbia
Beverly of Graustark	Sidney Franklin	Marion Davies, Antonio Moreno	Comedy	MGM
Beyond All Odds	Alan James	Eileen Sedgwick, Lew Meehan	Drama	Chesterfield
Beyond the Rockies	Jack Nelson	Bob Custer, Eugenia Gilbert, David Dunbar	Western	FBO
Beyond the Trail	Albert Herman	Bill Patton, Stuart Holmes, Clara Horton	Western	Chesterfield
The Big Show	George Terwilliger	John Lowell, Evangeline Russell, Jane Thomas	Drama	Associated Exhibitors
Bigger Than Barnum's	Ralph Ince	Ralph Lewis, Viola Dana	Drama	FBO
Black Paradise	Roy William Neill	Madge Bellamy, Leslie Fenton, Edmund Lowe	Adventure	Fox Film
The Black Pirate	Albert Parker	Douglas Fairbanks, Billie Dove	Swashbuckler	United Artists
The Blackbird	Tod Browning	Lon Chaney, Owen Moore	Drama	MGM
Blarney	Marcel De Sano	Renée Adorée, Ralph Graves, Paulette Duval	Comedy	MGM
The Blind Goddess	Victor Fleming	Jack Holt, Esther Ralston	Drama	Paramount
The Blind Trail	Leo D. Maloney	Leo D. Maloney, Josephine Hill, Nelson McDowell	Western	Independent
The Block Signal	Frank O'Connor	Ralph Lewis, Jean Arthur, Hugh Allan	Drama	Gotham
The Blonde Saint	Sven Gade	Lewis Stone, Doris Kenyon, Gilbert Roland	Adventure	First National
Bluebeard's Seven Wives	Alfred Santell	Ben Lyon, Lois Wilson, Blanche Sweet	Comedy	First National
Blue Blazes	Joseph Franz, Milburn Morante	Pete Morrison, Jim Welch	Western	Universal
The Blue Eagle	John Ford	George O'Brien, Janet Gaynor	Action	Fox Film
The Blue Streak	Noel M. Smith	Richard Talmadge, Louise Lorraine	Western	FBO
Blue Streak O'Neil	Paul Hurst	Al Hoxie, Ione Reed, Cliff Lyons	Western	Independent
The Boaster	Duke Worne	Ashton Dearholt, Gloria Grey, Joseph W. Girard	Comedy	Independent
La Bohème	King Vidor	Lillian Gish, John Gilbert, Renée Adorée	Drama	MGM
The Bonanza Buckaroo	Richard Thorpe	Jay Wilsey, Lafe McKee	Western	Independent
The Boob	William A. Wellman	Gertrude Olmstead, George K. Arthur, Joan Crawford	Comedy	MGM
The Border Sheriff	Robert N. Bradbury	Jack Hoxie, Olive Hasbrouck	Western	Universal
The Border Whirlwind	John P. McCarthy	Bob Custer, Josef Swickard	Western	FBO
Born to Battle	Robert De Lacey	Tom Tyler, Jean Arthur	Western	FBO
Born to the West	John Waters	Jack Holt, Margaret Morris, Raymond Hatton	Adventure	Paramount
The Boy Friend	Monta Bell	Marceline Day, John Harron	Drama	MGM
Bred in Old Kentucky	Edward Dillon	Viola Dana, Jed Prouty	Sports	FBO
Breed of the Sea	Ralph Ince	Margaret Livingston, Dorothy Dunbar	Adventure	FBO
Bride of the Storm	J. Stuart Blackton	Dolores Costello, Tyrone Power Sr.	Adventure	Warner Bros.
Broadway Billy	Harry Joe Brown	Billy Sullivan, Virginia Brown Faire	Action	Rayart
The Broadway Boob	Joseph Henabery	Glenn Hunter, Antrim Short	Comedy	Independent
The Broadway Gallant	Noel M. Smith	Richard Talmadge, Clara Horton	Action	FBO
Broken Hearts of Hollywood	Lloyd Bacon	Patsy Ruth Miller, Louise Dresser, Douglas Fairbanks Jr.	Comedy drama	Warner Bros.
Broken Homes	Hugh Dierker	Gaston Glass, Alice Lake, J. Barney Sherry	Drama	Independent
Brooding Eyes	Edward LeSaint	Lionel Barrymore, Ruth Clifford, Montagu Love	Crime	Independent
The Brown Derby	Charles Hines	Johnny Hines, Ruth Dwyer	Comedy	First National
Brown of Harvard	Jack Conway	William Haines, Jack Pickford, Mary Brian	Sports drama	MGM
The Buckaroo Kid	Lynn Reynolds	Hoot Gibson, Ethel Shannon	Western	Universal
Bucking the Truth	Milburn Morante	Pete Morrison, Bruce Gordon	Western	Universal
Butterflies in the Rain	Edward Sloman	Laura La Plante, James Kirkwood, Dorothy Cumming	Comedy	Universal

== C ==
Title	Director	Featured Cast	Genre	Note
The Call of the Klondike	Oscar Apfel	Gaston Glass, Dorothy Dwan	Western	Rayart
The Call of the Wilderness	Jack Nelson	Edna Marion, Lewis Sargent	Western	Chesterfield
Camille	Fred Niblo	Norma Talmadge, Gilbert Roland, Lilyan Tashman	Drama	First National
The Campus Flirt	Clarence G. Badger	Bebe Daniels, James Hall	Comedy	Paramount
The Canadian	William Beaudine	Thomas Meighan, Wyndham Standing	Drama	Paramount
The Canyon of Light	Benjamin Stoloff	Tom Mix, Dorothy Dwan, Barry Norton	Western	Fox Film
A Captain's Courage	Louis Chaudet	Ashton Dearholt, Dorothy Dwan	Drama	Rayart
The Carnival Girl	Cullen Tate	Marion Mack, Gladys Brockwell, Frankie Darro	Drama	Independent
The Cat's Pajamas	William A. Wellman	Betty Bronson, Ricardo Cortez	Comedy	Paramount
The Caveman	Lewis Milestone	Matt Moore, Marie Prevost, Myrna Loy	Comedy	Warner Bros.
Chasing Trouble	Milburn Morante	Pete Morrison, Tom London	Western	Universal
The Checkered Flag	John G. Adolfi	Elaine Hammerstein, Wallace MacDonald	Drama	Independent
The Cheerful Fraud	William A. Seiter	Reginald Denny, Gertrude Olmstead	Comedy	Universal
Chip of the Flying U	Lynn Reynolds	Hoot Gibson, Virginia Brown Faire	Western	Universal
Christine of the Big Tops	Archie Mayo	Pauline Garon, Cullen Landis	Romance	Independent
The City	Roy William Neill	May Allison, Robert Frazer, Walter McGrail	Drama	Fox Film
The Clinging Vine	Paul Sloane	Leatrice Joy, Tom Moore	Comedy	PDC
Code of the Northwest	Frank S. Mattison	Tom London, Shirley Palmer	Western	Chesterfield
The Cohens and Kellys	Harry A. Pollard	Charles Murray, Vera Gordon	Comedy	Universal
The College Boob	Harry Garson	Maurice Bennett Flynn, Jean Arthur	Comedy	FBO
College Days	Richard Thorpe	Marceline Day, Charles Delaney	Comedy Drama	Tiffany
Collegiate	Del Andrews	Alberta Vaughn, Donald Keith	Comedy	FBO
The Combat	Lynn Reynolds	House Peters, Wanda Hawley, Walter McGrail	Western	Universal
Corporal Kate	Paul Sloane	Vera Reynolds, Julia Faye, Majel Coleman	Comedy	PDC
The Count of Luxembourg	Arthur Gregor	George Walsh, Joan Meredith	Drama	Independent
The Country Beyond	Irving Cummings	Olive Borden, Ralph Graves, Gertrude Astor	Drama	Fox Film
The Cowboy and the Countess	Roy William Neill	Buck Jones, Helena D'Algy	Western	Fox Film
The Cowboy Cop	Robert De Lacey	Tom Tyler, Jean Arthur	Western	FBO
Crossed Signals	J. P. McGowan	Helen Holmes, Henry Victor	Action	Rayart
The Crown of Lies	Dimitri Buchowetzki	Pola Negri, Noah Beery	Drama	Paramount
Cruise of the Jasper B	James W. Horne	Rod La Rocque, Mildred Harris, Snitz Edwards	Comedy	PDC
Cupid's Knockout	Bruce Mitchell	Frank Merrill, Andrée Tourneur, George B. French	Comedy	Independent

== D ==
Title	Director	Featured Cast	Genre	Note
Dance Madness	Robert Z. Leonard	Conrad Nagel, Claire Windsor, Hedda Hopper	Comedy	MGM
The Dancer of Paris	Alfred Santell	Conway Tearle, Dorothy Mackaill	Drama	First National
Dancing Days	Albert H. Kelley	Helene Chadwick, Forrest Stanley, Lillian Rich	Drama	Independent
Dancing Mothers	Herbert Brenon	Alice Joyce, Conway Tearle, Clara Bow	Drama	Paramount
The Danger Girl	Edward Dillon	Priscilla Dean, John Bowers, Gustav von Seyffertitz	Drama	PDC
Danger Quest	Harry Joe Brown	Reed Howes, Ethel Shannon	Action	Rayart
The Dangerous Dub	Richard Thorpe	Buddy Roosevelt, Peggy Montgomery	Western	Independent
The Dangerous Dude	Harry Joe Brown	Reed Howes, Dorothy Dwan	Action	Rayart
Dangerous Traffic	Bennett Cohen	Ralph Bushman, Mildred Harris, Tom London	Drama	Independent
Daniel Boone Thru the Wilderness	Robert N. Bradbury	Roy Stewart, Kathleen Collins, Edward Hearn	Historical	Independent
The Dead Line	Jack Nelson	Bob Custer, Robert McKim	Western	FBO
The Demon	Clifford Smith	Jack Hoxie, Lola Todd	Western	Universal
Desert Gold	George B. Seitz	Neil Hamilton, Shirley Mason	Western	Paramount
The Desert's Toll	Clifford Smith	Francis McDonald, Kathleen Key, Anna May Wong	Western	MGM
Desert Valley	Scott R. Dunlap	Buck Jones, Virginia Brown Faire, Malcolm Waite	Western	Fox Film
The Desperate Game	Joseph Franz, Milburn Morante	Pete Morrison, Lew Meehan	Western	Universal
The Devil's Circus	Benjamin Christensen	Norma Shearer, Charles Emmett Mack, Carmel Myers	Drama	MGM
Devil's Dice	Tom Forman	Barbara Bedford, Robert Ellis, Josef Swickard	Drama	Independent
The Devil Horse	Fred Jackman	Yakima Canutt, Gladys McConnell	Western	Pathé Exchange
The Devil's Gulch	Jack Nelson	Bob Custer, Hazel Deane	Western	FBO
Devil's Island	Frank O'Connor	Pauline Frederick, Marian Nixon	Drama	Independent
The Dice Woman	Edward Dillon	Priscilla Dean, John Bowers, Gustav von Seyffertitz	Adventure	PDC
Diplomacy	Marshall Neilan	Blanche Sweet, Neil Hamilton, Arlette Marchal	Mystery	Paramount
The Dixie Flyer	Charles J. Hunt	Cullen Landis, Eva Novak	Action	Rayart
The Dixie Merchant	Frank Borzage	Jack Mulhall, Madge Bellamy	Drama	Fox Film
Don Juan	Alan Crosland	John Barrymore, Mary Astor, Warner Oland, Estelle Taylor	Adventure	Warner Bros.
Don Juan's Three Nights	John Francis Dillon	Lewis Stone, Shirley Mason	Romance	First National
Double Daring	Richard Thorpe	Hal Taliaferro, Jean Arthur	Western	Independent
Doubling with Danger	Scott R. Dunlap	Richard Talmadge, Ena Gregory, Joseph W. Girard	Mystery	FBO
Driftin' Thru	Scott R. Dunlap	Harry Carey, Stanton Heck	Western	Pathé Exchange
The Duchess of Buffalo	Sidney Franklin	Constance Talmadge, Tullio Carminati	Romantic comedy	First National
The Dude Cowboy	Jack Nelson	Bob Custer, Howard Truesdale	Western	FBO
Deuce High	Richard Thorpe	Jay Wilsey, Alma Rayford	Western	Independent

== E ==
Title	Director	Featured Cast	Genre	Note
The Eagle of the Sea	Frank Lloyd	Florence Vidor, Ricardo Cortez	Historical	Paramount
Early to Wed	Frank Borzage	Matt Moore, Katherine Perry, Albert Gran	Comedy	Fox Film
The Earth Woman	Walter Lang	Mary Alden, Priscilla Bonner	Drama	Independent
Ella Cinders	Alfred E. Green	Colleen Moore, Lloyd Hughes	Comedy	First National
The Enchanted Hill	Irvin Willat	Jack Holt, Florence Vidor, Mary Brian	Western	Paramount
The Escape	Milburn Morante	Pete Morrison, Bruce Gordon	Western	Universal
Everybody's Acting	Marshall Neilan	Betty Bronson, Ford Sterling, Louise Dresser	Drama	Paramount
Eve's Leaves	Paul Sloane	Leatrice Joy, William Boyd	Comedy	PDC
Exclusive Rights	Frank O'Connor	Gayne Whitman, Lillian Rich, Gaston Glass	Crime	Independent
Exit Smiling	Sam Taylor	Beatrice Lillie, Jack Pickford, Doris Lloyd	Comedy	MGM
The Exquisite Sinner	Joseph von Sternberg, Phil Rosen	Conrad Nagel, Renee Adoree	Drama	MGM

== F ==
Title	Director	Featured Cast	Genre	Note
The False Alarm	Frank O'Connor	Ralph Lewis, Dorothy Revier	Drama	Columbia
The Family Upstairs	John G. Blystone	Virginia Valli, J. Farrell MacDonald	Comedy	Fox Film
The Far Cry	Silvano Balboni	Blanche Sweet, Jack Mulhall	Drama	First National
Fascinating Youth	Sam Wood	Charles "Buddy" Rogers, Thelma Todd	Comedy	Paramount
Fifth Avenue	Robert G. Vignola	Marguerite De La Motte, Allan Forrest, Louise Dresser	Drama	PDC
Fig Leaves	Howard Hawks	George O'Brien, Olive Borden	Comedy	Fox Film
The Fighting Boob	Jack Nelson	Bob Custer, Joan Meredith	Western	FBO
The Fighting Buckaroo	Roy William Neill	Buck Jones, Sally Long	Western	Fox Film
The Fighting Cheat	Richard Thorpe	Hal Taliaferro, Jean Arthur	Western	Independent
The Fighting Edge	Henry Lehrman	Kenneth Harlan, Patsy Ruth Miller	Action	Warner Bros.
The Fighting Peacemaker	Clifford Smith	Jack Hoxie, Lola Todd	Western	Universal
Fine Manners	Richard Rosson	Gloria Swanson, Eugene O'Brien	Comedy	Paramount
The Fire Brigade	William Nigh	May McAvoy, Charles Ray, Holmes Herbert	Drama	MGM
The First Year	Frank Borzage	Matt Moore, Katherine Perry	Comedy	Fox Film
Flame of the Argentine	Edward Dillon	Evelyn Brent, Orville Caldwell	Action	FBO
The Flame of the Yukon	George Melford	Seena Owen, Matthew Betz	Adventure	PDC
The Flaming Forest	Reginald Barker	Antonio Moreno, Renée Adorée	Drama	MGM
The Flaming Frontier	Edward Sedgwick	Hoot Gibson, Anne Cornwall, Dustin Farnum	Western	Universal
Flaming Fury	James P. Hogan	Charles Delaney, Boris Karloff	Drama	FBO
Flashing Fangs	Henry McCarty	Lotus Thompson, Eddy Chandler	Action	FBO
Flesh and the Devil	Clarence Brown	John Gilbert, Greta Garbo	Melodrama	MGM
Flying High	Charles Hutchison	William Fairbanks, Alice Calhoun, Frank Rice	Action	Gotham
The Flying Horseman	Orville O. Dull	Buck Jones, Gladys McConnell	Western	Fox Film
The Flying Mail	Noel M. Smith	Joseph W. Girard, Kathleen Myers	Action	Independent
Fools of Fashion	James C. McKay	Mae Busch, Marceline Day	Comedy	Tiffany
Footloose Widows	Roy Del Ruth	Louise Fazenda, Jacqueline Logan	Comedy	Warner Bros.
For Alimony Only	William C. de Mille	Leatrice Joy, Clive Brook, Lilyan Tashman	Drama	PDC
For Heaven's Sake	Sam Taylor	Harold Lloyd, Jobyna Ralston	Comedy	Paramount
For Wives Only	Victor Heerman	Marie Prevost, Victor Varconi, Charles K. Gerrard	Comedy	PDC
Forbidden Waters	Alan Hale	Priscilla Dean, Walter McGrail	Comedy	PDC
Forest Havoc	Stuart Paton	Forrest Stanley, Peggy Montgomery, Martha Mattox	Drama	Independent
Forever After	F. Harmon Weight	Lloyd Hughes, Mary Astor	Drama	First National
Forlorn River	John Waters	Jack Holt, Raymond Hatton, Arlette Marchal	Adventure	Paramount
Fort Frayne	Ben F. Wilson	Neva Gerber, Ruth Royce, Lafe McKee	Western	Independent
French Dressing	Allan Dwan	H. B. Warner, Clive Brook, Lois Wilson	Romantic comedy	First National
The Frontier Trail	Scott R. Dunlap	Harry Carey, Mabel Julienne Scott	Western	Pathé Exchange

== G ==
Title	Director	Featured Cast	Genre	Note
The Gallant Fool	Duke Worne	Billy Sullivan, Hazel Deane, Ruth Royce	Romance	Rayart
The Gay Deceiver	John M. Stahl	Lew Cody, Marceline Day	Comedy	MGM
The General	Clyde Bruckman, Buster Keaton	Buster Keaton, Marion Mack	Comedy	United Artists
The Gentle Cyclone	W. S. Van Dyke	Buck Jones, Will Walling	Comedy	Fox Film
Gigolo	William K. Howard	Rod La Rocque, Jobyna Ralston, Louise Dresser	Drama	PDC
The Gilded Butterfly	John Griffith Wray	Alma Rubens, Bert Lytell, Huntley Gordon	Drama	Fox Film
The Gilded Highway	J. Stuart Blackton	Dorothy Devore, John Harron, Myrna Loy	Drama	Warner Bros.
The Girl from Montmartre	Alfred E. Green	Barbara LaMarr, Lewis Stone	Romance	First National
Glenister of the Mounted	Harry Garson	Maurice 'Lefty' Flynn, Bess Flowers	Western	FBO
God Gave Me Twenty Cents	Herbert Brenon	Lois Moran, Lya De Putti, Jack Mulhall	Drama	Paramount
Going Crooked	George Melford	Bessie Love, Gustav von Seyffertitz	Drama	Fox Film
Going the Limit	Chester Withey	George O'Hara, Sally Long	Comedy	FBO
The Golden Web	Walter Lang	Lillian Rich, Huntley Gordon, Lawford Davidson	Mystery	Gotham
Good and Naughty	Malcolm St. Clair	Pola Negri, Tom Moore, Stuart Holmes	Comedy	Paramount
The Grand Duchess and the Waiter	Malcolm St. Clair	Florence Vidor, Adolphe Menjou	Comedy	Paramount
The Great Deception	Howard Higgin	Ben Lyon, Aileen Pringle, Basil Rathbone	Drama	First National
The Great Gatsby	Herbert Brenon	Warner Baxter, Neil Hamilton	Drama	Paramount
The Great K & A Train Robbery	Lewis Seiler	Tom Mix, Dorothy Dwan	Western	Fox Film
The Greater Glory	Curt Rehfeld	Conway Tearle, Anna Q. Nilsson, May Allison	Drama	First National
The Grey Devil	Bennett Cohen	Jack Perrin, Tom London	Western	Rayart

== H ==
Title	Director	Featured Cast	Genre	Note
Hair-Trigger Baxter	Jack Nelson	Bob Custer, Eugenia Gilbert	Western	FBO
Hands Across the Border	David Kirkland	Fred Thomson, Bess Flowers	Western	RBO
Hands Up!	Clarence Badger	Raymond Griffith, Virginia Lee Corbin, Marian Nixon	Comedy	Paramount
Hard Boiled	John G. Blystone	Tom Mix, Helene Chadwick	Western	Fox Film
Hearts and Fists	Lloyd Ingraham	John Bowers, Marguerite De La Motte, Alan Hale	Drama	Independent
Hearts and Spangles	Frank O'Connor	Wanda Hawley, Robert Gordon, Barbara Tennant	Drama	Gotham
Hell-Bent for Heaven	J. Stuart Blackton	Patsy Ruth Miller, John Harron	Drama	Warner Bros.
Hell's Four Hundred	John Griffith Wray	Harrison Ford, Marceline Day	Drama	Fox Film
Her Big Night	Melville W. Brown	Laura La Plante, Einar Hanson, Zasu Pitts	Comedy	Universal
Her Honor, the Governor	Chester Withey	Pauline Frederick, Carroll Nye, Tom Santschi	Drama	FBO
Her Man o' War	Frank Urson	Jetta Goudal, William Boyd	Drama	PDC
Her Sacrifice	Wilfred Lucas	Gaston Glass, Bryant Washburn, Gladys Brockwell	Drama	Independent
Her Second Chance	Lambert Hillyer	Anna Q. Nilsson, Huntley Gordon	Drama	First National
A Hero of the Big Snows	Herman C. Raymaker	Rin Tin Tin, Alice Calhoun	Adventure	Warner Bros.
The Hidden Way	Joseph De Grasse	Mary Carr, Gloria Grey, Tom Santschi	Crime	Independent
The High Flyer	Harry Joe Brown	Reed Howes, Ethel Shannon	Action	Rayart
The High Hand	Leo D. Maloney	Leo D. Maloney, Josephine Hill, Paul Hurst	Western	Pathe Exchange
High Steppers	Edwin Carewe	Mary Astor, Lloyd Hughes, Dolores del Río	Drama	First National
The Highbinders	George Terwilliger	Marjorie Daw, George Hackathorne	Drama	Independent
His Jazz Bride	Herman C. Raymaker	Marie Prevost, Matt Moore	Drama	Warner Bros.
His New York Wife	Albert H. Kelley	Alice Day, Theodore von Eltz, Ethel Clayton	Drama	Independent
Hold That Lion	William Beaudine	Douglas MacLean, Walter Hiers, Constance Howard	Comedy	Paramount
The Hollywood Reporter	Bruce Mitchell	Frank Merrill, Peggy Montgomery, Charles K. French	Crime	Independent
Honesty - The Best Policy	Chester Bennett, Albert Ray	Rockliffe Fellowes, Pauline Starke, Johnnie Walker	Comedy	Fox Film
The Honeymoon Express	James Flood	Willard Louis, Irene Rich, Helene Costello	Drama	Warner Bros.

== I ==
Title	Director	Featured Cast	Genre	Note
The Ice Flood	George B. Seitz	Kenneth Harlan, Viola Dana	Drama	Universal
The Impostor	Chester Withey	Evelyn Brent, Carroll Nye	Crime	FBO
In Search of a Hero	Duke Worne	Ashton Dearholt, Jane Thomas, James Harrison	Comedy	Independent
Into Her Kingdom	Svend Gade	Corinne Griffith, Einar Hanson	Drama	First National
Irene	Alfred E. Green	Colleen Moore	Romantic comedy	First National
Is That Nice?	Del Andrews	George O'Hara, Doris Hill	Comedy	FBO
The Isle of Retribution	James P. Hogan	Lillian Rich, Victor McLaglen	Adventure	FBO
It Must Be Love	Alfred E. Green	Colleen Moore, Jean Hersholt	Comedy	First National
It's the Old Army Game	A. Edward Sutherland	W. C. Fields, Louise Brooks	Comedy	Paramount

== J ==
Title	Director	Featured Cast	Genre	Note
The Jade Cup	Frank Hall Crane	Evelyn Brent, Jack Luden	Mystery	FBO
The Jazz Girl	Howard M. Mitchell	Gaston Glass, Edith Roberts	Drama	Independent
Jim, the Conqueror	George B. Seitz	William Boyd, Elinor Fair	Western	PDC
The Johnstown Flood	Irving Cummings	George O'Brien, Janet Gaynor	Drama	Fox Film
Josselyn's Wife	Richard Thorpe	Pauline Frederick, Holmes Herbert	Crime	Tiffany
Just Another Blonde	Alfred Santell	Dorothy Mackaill, Jack Mulhall, Louise Brooks	Comedy	First National
Just Suppose	Kenneth Webb	Richard Barthelmess, Lois Moran, Henry Vibart	Drama	First National

== K ==
Title	Director	Featured Cast	Genre	Note
Kentucky Handicap	Harry Joe Brown	Reed Howes, Alice Calhoun	Action	Rayart
The Kick-Off	Wesley Ruggles	George Walsh, Leila Hyams	Drama	Independent
Kid Boots	Frank Tuttle	Eddie Cantor, Clara Bow, Billie Dove	Comedy	Paramount
Kiki	Clarence Brown	Norma Talmadge, Ronald Colman	Romantic comedy	First National
King of the Pack	Frank Richardson	Charlotte Stevens, Robert Gordon, Vera Lewis	Adventure	Gotham
King of the Saddle	William James Craft	Bill Cody, Billy Franey	Western	Independent
The King of the Turf	James P. Hogan	George Irving, Patsy Ruth Miller, Kenneth Harlan	Drama	FBO
Kosher Kitty Kelly	James W. Horne	Viola Dana, Tom Forman	Comedy	FBO

== L ==
Title	Director	Featured Cast	Genre	Note
Laddie	James Leo Meehan	John Bowers, Bess Flowers, Theodore von Eltz	Drama	FBO
Ladies at Play	Alfred E. Green	Doris Kenyon, Lloyd Hughes	Comedy	First National
The Lady from Hell	Stuart Paton	Roy Stewart, Blanche Sweet, Ralph Lewis	Western	Independent
Ladies of Leisure	Tom Buckingham	Elaine Hammerstein, Robert Ellis	Drama	Columbia
The Lady of the Harem	Raoul Walsh	Ernest Torrence, Greta Nissen, Louise Fazenda	Adventure	Paramount
The Last Alarm	Oscar Apfel	Rex Lease, Wanda Hawley	Drama	Rayart
The Last Chance	Horace B. Carpenter	Bill Patton, Merrill McCormick	Western	Chesterfield
The Last Frontier	George B. Seitz	William Boyd, Marguerite De La Motte, Jack Hoxie	Western	PDC
The Law of the Snow Country	Paul Hurst	Kenneth MacDonald, Jane Thomas, Noble Johnson	Western	Independent
Lazy Lightning	William Wyler	Art Acord, Fay Wray	Western	Universal
Let's Get Married	Gregory La Cava	Richard Dix, Lois Wilson	Comedy	Paramount
Lew Tyler's Wives	Harley Knoles	Frank Mayo, Ruth Clifford, Hedda Hopper	Drama	Independent
Lightning Bill	Louis Chaudet	William Bailey, Jean Arthur, Jack Henderson	Western	Independent
Lightning Reporter	John W. Noble	Johnnie Walker, Sylvia Breamer, Burr McIntosh	Drama	Independent
The Lily	Victor Schertzinger	Belle Bennett, Ian Keith	Drama	Fox Film
The Little Firebrand	Charles Hutchison	George Fawcett, Lou Tellegen	Comedy	Pathé Exchange
The Little Giant	William Nigh	Glenn Hunter, Edna Murphy	Comedy	Universal
The Little Irish Girl	Roy Del Ruth	Dolores Costello, John Harron	Romance	Warner Bros.
The Lodge in the Wilderness	Henry McCarty	Anita Stewart, Edmund Burns, Duane Thompson	Drama	Tiffany
Lone Hand Saunders	B. Reeves Eason	Fred Thomson, Bess Flowers	Western	FBO
The Lone Wolf Returns	Ralph Ince	Bert Lytell, Billie Dove, Gustav von Seyffertitz	Mystery	Columbia
Looking for Trouble	Robert North Bradbury	Jack Hoxie, Marceline Day	Western	Universal
Lost at Sea	Louis J. Gasnier	Huntley Gordon, Lowell Sherman, Jane Novak	Drama	Tiffany
Love 'Em and Leave 'Em	Frank Tuttle	Evelyn Brent, Lawrence Gray, Louise Brooks	Comedy	Paramount
The Love Thief	John McDermott	Norman Kerry, Greta Nissen, Nigel Barrie	Romance	Universal
The Love Toy	Erle C. Kenton	Lowell Sherman, Jane Winton	Comedy	Warner Bros.
Love's Blindness	John Francis Dillon	Pauline Starke, Antonio Moreno, Lilyan Tashman	Drama	MGM
The Loves of Ricardo	George Beban	George Beban, Monte Collins, Jane Starr	Drama	FBO
Lovey Mary	King Baggot	Bessie Love, William Haines, Mary Alden	Comedy drama	MGM
The Lucky Lady	Raoul Walsh	Greta Nissen, Lionel Barrymore	Comedy	Paramount

== M ==
Title	Director	Featured Cast	Genre	Note
Mademoiselle Modiste	Robert Z. Leonard	Corinne Griffith, Norman Kerry	Romance	First National
Made for Love	Paul Sloane	Leatrice Joy, Edmund Burns	Drama	PDC
The Magician	Rex Ingram	Alice Terry, Paul Wegener	Horror	MGM
A Man Four-Square	Roy William Neill	Buck Jones, Harry Woods	Western	Fox Film
The Man from Oklahoma	Harry S. Webb	Jack Perrin, Josephine Hill	Western	Rayart
The Man from the West	Albert S. Rogell	Art Acord, Eugenia Gilbert	Western	Universal
The Man in the Saddle	Lynn Reynolds, Clifford Smith	Hoot Gibson, Fay Wray	Western	Universal
The Man in the Shadow	David Hartford	David Torrence, Mary McAllister, Joseph Bennett	Drama	Independent
A Man of Quality	Wesley Ruggles	George Walsh, Ruth Dwyer, Brian Donlevy	Crime	Independent
Man of the Forest	John Waters	Jack Holt, Georgia Hale	Western	Paramount
Man Rustlin'	Del Andrews	Bob Custer, Jules Cowles	Western	FBO
The Man Upstairs	Roy Del Ruth	Monte Blue, Dorothy Devore	Comedy	Warner Bros.
Mantrap	Victor Fleming	Clara Bow, Percy Marmont, Ernest Torrence	Romantic comedy	Paramount
The Man Upstairs	Roy Del Ruth	Monte Blue, Dorothy Devore, Helen Dunbar	Comedy	Warner Bros.
Mare Nostrum	Rex Ingram	Antonio Moreno, Alice Terry	Spy	MGM
The Marriage Clause	Lois Weber	Francis X. Bushman, Billie Dove, Warner Oland	Drama	Universal
Marriage License?	Frank Borzage	Alma Rubens, Walter McGrail, Walter Pidgeon	Drama	Fox Film
The Masquerade Bandit	Robert De Lacey	Tom Tyler, Dorothy Dunbar, Ethan Laidlaw	Action	FBO
Meet the Prince	Joseph Henabery	Joseph Schildkraut, Marguerite De La Motte	Comedy	PDC
Memory Lane	John M. Stahl	Eleanor Boardman, Conrad Nagel	Comedy	First National
Men of Steel	George Archainbaud	Milton Sills, Doris Kenyon, May Allison	Drama	First National
Men of the Night	Albert S. Rogell	Herbert Rawlinson, Wanda Hawley, Gareth Hughes	Crime	Independent
The Merry Cavalier	Noel M. Smith	Richard Talmadge, Charlotte Stevens	Drama	FBO
The Midnight Kiss	Irving Cummings	Janet Gaynor, Doris Lloyd	Comedy	Fox Film
The Midnight Limited	Oscar Apfel	Gaston Glass, Wanda Hawley, Ashton Dearholt	Action	Rayart
Midnight Lovers	John Francis Dillon	Lewis Stone, Anna Q. Nilsson	Comedy	First National
The Midnight Message	Paul Hurst	Wanda Hawley, Mary Carr	Drama	Independent
The Midnight Sun	Dimitri Buchowetzki	Laura La Plante, Pat O'Malley, Michael Vavitch	Drama	Universal
Mike	Marshall Neilan	Sally O'Neil, William Haines	Drama	MGM
The Mile-a-Minute Man	Jack Nelson	William Fairbanks, Virginia Brown Faire, George Periolat	Drama	Gotham
The Millionaire Policeman	Edward LeSaint	Herbert Rawlinson, Eva Novak, Eugenie Besserer	Drama	Independent
Millionaires	Herman C. Raymaker	Louise Fazenda, Vera Gordon	Comedy	Warner Bros.
The Miracle of Life	Stanner E.V. Taylor	Percy Marmont, Mae Busch, Nita Naldi	Drama	Independent
Mismates	Charles Brabin	Doris Kenyon, Warner Baxter	Drama	First National
Miss Brewster's Millions	Clarence G. Badger	Bebe Daniels, Warner Baxter, Ford Sterling	Comedy	Paramount
Miss Nobody	Lambert Hillyer	Anna Q. Nilsson, Walter Pidgeon, Louise Fazenda	Drama	First National
Money Talks	Archie Mayo	Claire Windsor, Owen Moore	Comedy	MGM
Money to Burn	Walter Lang	Malcolm McGregor, Dorothy Devore, Nina Romano	Drama	Gotham
Monte Carlo	Christy Cabanne	Lew Cody, Gertrude Olmstead	Comedy	MGM
Moran of the Mounted	Harry Joe Brown	Reed Howes, Sheldon Lewis	Western	Rayart
More Pay, Less Work	Albert Ray	Albert Gran, Mary Brian, Charles "Buddy" Rogers	Comedy	Fox Film
Morganson's Finish	Fred Windemere	Anita Stewart, Johnnie Walker	Drama	Tiffany
Mulhall's Greatest Catch	Harry Garson	Maurice 'Lefty' Flynn, Henry Victor	Drama	FBO
My Official Wife	Paul L. Stein	Irene Rich, Conway Tearle, Jane Winton	Drama	Warner Bros.
My Old Dutch	Laurence Trimble	May McAvoy, Cullen Landis, Jean Hersholt	Drama	Universal
My Own Pal	John G. Blystone	Tom Mix, Olive Borden, Tom Santschi	Western	Fox Film
The Mystery Club	Herbert Blaché	Matt Moore, Edith Roberts	Mystery	Universal

== N ==
Title	Director	Featured Cast	Genre	Note
The Nervous Wreck	Scott Sidney	Harrison Ford, Phyllis Haver	Comedy	PDC
The New Klondike	Lewis Milestone	Thomas Meighan, Lila Lee	Romantic comedy	Paramount
The Night Cry	Herman C. Raymaker	Rin Tin Tin, June Marlowe, John Harron	Drama	Warner Bros.
The Night Owl	Harry Joe Brown	Reed Howes, Gladys Hulette	Action	Rayart
The Night Patrol	Noel M. Smith	Richard Talmadge, Mary Carr	Crime	FBO
No Man's Gold	Lewis Seiler	Tom Mix, Eva Novak	Western	Fox Film
The Non-Stop Flight	Emory Johnson	Knute Erickson, Marcella Daly	Action	FBO
The Nutcracker	Lloyd Ingraham	Edward Everett Horton, Mae Busch, Harry Myers	Comedy	Associated Exhibitors

== O ==
Title	Director	Featured Cast	Genre	Note
Obey the Law	Alfred Raboch	Bert Lytell, Edna Murphy	Drama	Columbia
Officer Jim	Wilbur McGaugh	Gloria Grey, Josef Swickard	Drama	Independent
Oh, Baby!	Harley Knoles	David Butler, Madge Kennedy, Creighton Hale	Comedy drama	Universal
Oh Billy, Behave	Grover Jones	Billy West, Charlotte Merriam, Lionel Belmore	Comedy	Rayart
Oh, What a Night!	Lloyd Ingraham	Raymond McKee, Edna Murphy, Charles K. French	Comedy	Independent
Oh! What a Nurse!	Charles Reisner	Sydney Chaplin, Patsy Ruth Miller	Comedy	Warner Bros.
Old Ironsides	James Cruze	Charles Farrell, Esther Ralston, Wallace Beery	Adventure	Paramount
Old Loves and New	Maurice Tourneur	Lewis Stone, Barbara Bedford, Walter Pidgeon	Drama	First National
The Old Soak	Edward Sloman	Jean Hersholt, June Marlowe, Gertrude Astor	Drama	Universal
One Minute to Play	Sam Wood	Red Grange, Mary McAllister	Drama	FBO
One Punch O'Day	Harry Joe Brown	Billy Sullivan, Charlotte Merriam	Action	Rayart
Other Women's Husbands	Erle C. Kenton	Monte Blue, Marie Prevost, Phyllis Haver	Comedy	Warner Bros.
Out of the Storm	Louis J. Gasnier	Jacqueline Logan, Tyrone Power Sr.	Drama	Tiffany
Out of the West	Robert De Lacey	Tom Tyler, Ethan Laidlaw	Western	FBO
The Outlaw Express	Leo D. Maloney	Leo D. Maloney, Melbourne MacDowell	Western	Pathé Exchange
The Outsider	Rowland V. Lee	Jacqueline Logan, Walter Pidgeon Lou Tellegen	Drama	Fox Film

== P ==
Title	Director	Featured Cast	Genre	Note
Padlocked	Allan Dwan	Lois Moran, Noah Beery Sr., Louise Dresser	Drama	Paramount
The Palace of Pleasure	Emmett J. Flynn	Betty Compson, Edmund Lowe	Drama	Fox Film
The Palm Beach Girl	Erle C. Kenton	Bebe Daniels, Lawrence Gray	Comedy	Paramount
Pals First	Edwin Carewe	Dolores del Río, Lloyd Hughes, Rita Carewe	Comedy	First National
Pals in Paradise	George B. Seitz	Rudolph Schildkraut, John Bowers, Marguerite De La Motte	Drama	PDC
Paradise	Irvin Willat	Milton Sills, Betty Bronson, Noah Beery	Romance	First National
Paris	Edmund Goulding	Charles Ray, Joan Crawford	Drama	MGM
Paris at Midnight	E. Mason Hopper	Jetta Goudal, Lionel Barrymore, Mary Brian	Drama	PDC
Partners Again	Henry King	George Sydney, Allan Forrest	Comedy	United Artists
The Passionate Quest	J. Stuart Blackton	May McAvoy, Willard Louis, Louise Fazenda	Drama	Warner Bros.
The Patent Leather Pug	Albert S. Rogell	Billy Sullivan, Ruth Dwyer	Drama	Rayart
The Pay-Off	Dell Henderson	Robert McKim, Marcella Daly, Otis Harlan	Drama	Independent
Perils of the Coast Guard	Oscar Apfel	Cullen Landis, Dorothy Dwan	Adventure	Rayart
The Phantom Bullet	Clifford Smith	Hoot Gibson, Eileen Percy	Western	Universal
The Phantom of the Forest	Henry McCarty	Betty Francisco, Eddie Phillips, Irene Hunt	Adventure	Gotham
Phantom Police	Robert Dillon	Herbert Rawlinson, Purnell Pratt	Action	Rayart
Pirates of the Sky	Charles Andrews	Wanda Hawley, Crauford Kent	Action	Pathé Exchange
Pleasures of the Rich	Louis J. Gasnier	Helene Chadwick, Jack Mulhall, Hedda Hopper	Drama	Tiffany
Poker Faces	Harry A. Pollard	Edward Everett Horton, Laura La Plante	Comedy	Universal
A Poor Girl's Romance	F. Harmon Weight	Creighton Hale, Gertrude Short	Drama	FBO
The Popular Sin	Malcolm St. Clair	Florence Vidor, Clive Brook, Greta Nissen	Comedy	Paramount
The Power of the Weak	William James Craft	Alice Calhoun, Carl Miller, Spottiswoode Aitken	Drama	Independent
The Prince of Pilsen	Paul Powell	Anita Stewart, Allan Forrest	Comedy	PDC
Prince of Tempters	Lothar Mendes	Lois Moran, Ben Lyon	Romance	First National
Prisoners of the Storm	Lynn Reynolds	House Peters, Peggy Montgomery, Walter McGrail	Western	Universal
Private Izzy Murphy	Lloyd Bacon	Patsy Ruth Miller, George Jessel	Comedy	Warner Bros.
Prowlers of the Night	Ernst Laemmle	Fred Humes, Barbara Kent	Drama	Universal
Puppets	George Archainbaud	Milton Sills, Gertrude Olmstead	Drama	First National

== Q ==
Title	Director	Featured Cast	Genre	Note
The Quarterback	Fred C. Newmeyer	Richard Dix, Esther Ralston	Comedy	Paramount
Queen o'Diamonds	Chester Withey	Evelyn Brent, Theodore von Eltz	Drama	FBO

== R ==
Title	Director	Featured Cast	Genre	Note
Race Wild	Oscar Apfel	Rex Lease, Eileen Percy, David Torrence	Sports	Independent
Racing Blood	Frank Richardson	Robert Agnew, Anne Cornwall, John Elliott	Drama	Gotham
Racing Romance	Harry Joe Brown	Reed Howes, Virginia Brown Faire	Action	Rayart
Raggedy Rose	Richard Wallace	Mabel Normand, Carl Miller, James Finlayson	Comedy	Pathé Exchange
Rainbow Riley	Charles Hines	Johnny Hines, Bradley Barker	Comedy	First National
The Rainmaker	Clarence G. Badger	William Collier Jr., Georgia Hale, Ernest Torrence	Drama	Paramount
Ranson's Folly	Sidney Olcott	Richard Barthelmess, Dorothy Mackaill	Western	First National
Rapid Fire Romance	Harry Joe Brown	Billy Sullivan, Marjorie Bonner	Action	Rayart
Rawhide	Richard Thorpe	Jay Wilsey, Molly Malone	Western	Independent
The Reckless Lady	Howard Higgin	Belle Bennett, Lois Moran	Drama	First National
Red Dice	William K. Howard	Rod La Rocque, Marguerite De La Motte, Gustav von Seyffertitz	Crime	PDC
Red Hot Leather	Albert S. Rogell	Jack Hoxie, Ena Gregory	Western	Universal
Redheads Preferred	Allen Dale	Raymond Hitchcock, Marjorie Daw, Theodore von Eltz	Comedy	Tiffany
A Regular Scout	David Kirkland	Fred Thomson, Olive Hasbrouck	Western	FBO
Remember	David Selman	Dorothy Phillips, Lola Todd	Drama	Columbia
The Return of Peter Grimm	Victor Schertzinger	Alec B. Francis, Janet Gaynor	Fantasy	Fox Film
The Ridin' Rascal	Clifford Smith	Art Acord, Olive Hasbrouck	Western	Universal
Risky Business	Alan Hale	Vera Reynolds, Ethel Clayton, Ward Crane	Comedy	PDC
The Road to Glory	Howard Hawks	May McAvoy, Leslie Fenton	Drama	Fox Film
The Road to Mandalay	Tod Browning	Lon Chaney, Lois Moran, Owen Moore	Drama	MGM
The Roaring Rider	Richard Thorpe	Jay Wilsey, Jean Arthur	Western	Independent
The Roaring Road	Paul Hurst	Kenneth MacDonald, Jane Thomas, William H. Strauss	Action	Independent
Rocking Moon	George Melford	Lilyan Tashman, John Bowers	Drama	PDC
Rolling Home	William A. Seiter	Reginald Denny, Marian Nixon	Comedy	Universal
The Romance of a Million Dollars	Tom Terriss	Glenn Hunter, Alyce Mills, Gaston Glass	Drama	Independent
Rose of the Tenements	Phil Rosen	Shirley Mason, Johnny Harron	Melodrama	FBO
The Runaway	William C. deMille	Clara Bow, Warner Baxter, William Powell	Drama	Paramount
The Runaway Express	Edward Sedgwick	Jack Dougherty, Blanche Mehaffey	Action	Universal
Rustlers' Ranch	Clifford Smith	Art Acord, Olive Hasbrouck	Western	Universal
Rustling for Cupid	Irving Cummings	George O'Brien, Anita Stewart	Western	Fox Film

== S ==
Title	Director	Featured Cast	Genre	Note
Sandy	Harry Beaumont	Madge Bellamy, Leslie Fenton	Drama	Fox Film
The Sap	Erle C. Kenton	Kenneth Harlan, Heinie Conklin, Mary McAllister	Comedy	Warner Bros.
The Savage	Fred C. Newmeyer	Ben Lyon, May McAvoy	Comedy	First National
Say It Again	Gregory La Cava	Richard Dix, Alyce Mills, Chester Conklin	Comedy	Paramount
The Scarlet Letter	Victor Sjöström	Lillian Gish, Lars Hanson, Henry B. Walthall, Karl Dane	Drama	MGM
The Scrappin' Kid	Clifford Smith	Art Acord, Edmund Cobb	Western	Universal
The Sea Beast	Millard Webb	John Barrymore, Dolores Costello, George O'Hara	Adventure	Warner Bros.
Sea Horses	Allan Dwan	Jack Holt, Florence Vidor, William Powell	Drama	Paramount
The Sea Wolf	Ralph Ince	Claire Adams, Theodore von Eltz	Drama	PDC
Secret Orders	Chester Withey	Robert Frazer, Evelyn Brent	Drama	FBO
The Self Starter	Harry Joe Brown	Reed Howes, Mildred Harris, Sheldon Lewis	Comedy	Rayart
Senor Daredevil	Albert S. Rogell	Ken Maynard, Dorothy Devore	Western	First National
The Set-Up	Clifford Smith	Art Acord, Alta Allen	Western	Universal
Shadow of the Law	Wallace Worsley	Clara Bow, Stuart Holmes	Crime	Independent
Shameful Behavior?	Albert H. Kelley	Edith Roberts, Richard Tucker	Romance	Independent
The Shamrock Handicap	John Ford	Janet Gaynor, Leslie Fenton	Romance	Fox Film
Shipwrecked	Joseph Henabery	Seena Owen, Joseph Schildkraut	Adventure	PDC
The Show-Off	Malcolm St. Clair	Ford Sterling, Louise Brooks	Comedy	Paramount
Siberia	Victor Schertzinger	Alma Rubens, Edmund Lowe	Drama	Fox Film
The Sign of the Claw	B. Reeves Eason	Ethel Shannon, Edward Hearn, Lee Shumway	Action	Gotham
Silence	Rupert Julian	Vera Reynolds, H.B. Warner, Raymond Hatton	Crime	PDC
The Silent Lover	George Archainbaud	Milton Sills, Natalie Kingston, Viola Dana	Adventure	First National
The Silent Power	Frank O'Connor	Ralph Lewis, Ethel Shannon, Charles Delaney	Drama	Gotham
Silken Shackles	Walter Morosco	Irene Rich, Huntley Gordon, Victor Varconi	Drama	Warner Bros.
The Silver Treasure	Rowland V. Lee	George O'Brien, Helena D'Algy	Adventure	Fox Film
Sin Cargo	Louis J. Gasnier	Shirley Mason, Robert Frazer, Gertrude Astor	Drama	Tiffany
Sir Lumberjack	Harry Garson	Maurice 'Lefty' Flynn, Kathleen Myers	Drama	FBO
A Six Shootin' Romance	Clifford Smith	Jack Hoxie, Olive Hasbrouck, William Steele	Western	Universal
Skinner's Dress Suit	William A. Seiter	Reginald Denny, Laura La Plante	Comedy	Universal
The Skyrocket	Marshall Neilan	Gladys Brockwell, Owen Moore, Gladys Hulette	Romance	Independent
Sky High Corral	Clifford Smith	Art Acord, Marguerite Clayton	Western	Universal
The Smoke Eaters	Charles Hutchison	Cullen Landis, Wanda Hawley	Action	Rayart
So This Is Paris	Ernst Lubitsch	Monte Blue, Patsy Ruth Miller, Myrna Loy	Comedy	Warner Bros.
A Social Celebrity	Malcolm St. Clair	Adolphe Menjou, Louise Brooks	Comedy	Paramount
The Social Highwayman	William Beaudine	Dorothy Devore, Montagu Love	Comedy	Warner Bros.
Somebody's Mother	Oscar Apfel	Mary Carr, Rex Lease	Crime	Rayart
The Son of the Sheik	George Fitzmaurice	Rudolph Valentino, Vilma Bánky, Montagu Love	Adventure	United Artists
The Song and Dance Man	Herbert Brenon	Tom Moore, Bessie Love	Comedy drama	Paramount
So's Your Old Man	Gregory La Cava	W. C. Fields, Alice Joyce	Comedy	Paramount
The Sorrows of Satan	D. W. Griffith	Adolphe Menjou, Ricardo Cortez, Carol Dempster, Lya De Putti	Fantasy	Paramount
Spangles	Frank O'Connor	Marian Nixon, Pat O'Malley	Drama	Universal
Sparrows	William Beaudine	Mary Pickford, Roy Stewart, Gustav von Seyffertitz	Drama	United Artists
Speed Cop	Duke Worne	Billy Sullivan, Francis Ford	Action	Rayart
Speed Crazed	Duke Worne	Billy Sullivan, Joseph W. Girard	Sports action	Rayart
The Speed Limit	Frank O'Connor	Raymond McKee, Ethel Shannon, Bruce Gordon	Comedy	Gotham
Speeding Through	Bertram Bracken	Creighton Hale, Robert McKim	Drama	Independent
The Speeding Venus	Edward Dillon	Priscilla Dean, Robert Frazer	Drama	PDC
Speedy Spurs	Richard Thorpe	Jay Wilsey, Alma Rayford	Western	Independent
The Sporting Lover	Alan Hale	Conway Tearle, Barbara Bedford, Ward Crane	Sports	First National
Stepping Along	Charles Hines	Johnny Hines, Mary Brian	Comedy	First National
Stick to Your Story	Harry Joe Brown	Billy Sullivan, Bruce Gordon	Action	Rayart
The Still Alarm	Edward Laemmle	Helene Chadwick, William Russell, Richard Travers	Drama	Universal
The Stolen Ranch	William Wyler	Fred Humes, Louise Lorraine	Western	Universal
Stop, Look and Listen	Larry Semon	Dorothy Dwan, Mary Carr, Oliver Hardy	Comedy	Pathé Exchange
Stranded in Paris	Arthur Rosson	Bebe Daniels, Ford Sterling	Comedy	Paramount
Striving for Fortune	Nat Ross	George Walsh, Tefft Johnson	Drama	Independent
The Strong Man	Frank Capra	Harry Langdon, Priscilla Bonner, Gertrude Astor	Comedy	First National
Subway Sadie	Alfred Santell	Dorothy Mackaill, Jack Mulhall	Comedy	First National
Summer Bachelors	Allan Dwan	Madge Bellamy, Allan Forrest	Romantic comedy	Fox Film
Sunny Side Up	Donald Crisp	Vera Reynolds, George K. Arthur	Comedy	PDC
Sunshine of Paradise Alley	Jack Nelson	Barbara Bedford, Nigel Barrie	Romance	Independent
Sweet Daddies	Alfred Santell	George Sidney, Vera Gordon	Comedy	First National
Sweet Rosie O'Grady	Frank R. Strayer	Shirley Mason, Cullen Landis	Comedy	Columbia
Syncopating Sue	Richard Wallace	Corinne Griffith, Tom Moore	Comedy	First National

== T ==
Title	Director	Featured Cast	Genre	Note
Take It from Me	William A. Seiter	Reginald Denny, Blanche Mehaffey	Comedy	Universal
The Taxi Mystery	Fred Windemere	Edith Roberts, Robert Agnew, Virginia Pearson	Mystery	Independent
Tell It to the Marines	George W. Hill	Lon Chaney, William Haines, Eleanor Boardman	Comedy	MGM
The Temptress	Fred Niblo, Mauritz Stiller	Greta Garbo, Antonio Moreno	Drama	MGM
Tentacles of the North	Louis Chaudet	Gaston Glass, Alice Calhoun, Joseph W. Girard	Adventure	Rayart
The Terror	Clifford Smith	Art Acord, Edmund Cobb	Western	Universal
The Test of Donald Norton	B. Reeves Eason	George Walsh, Tyrone Power Sr., Eugenia Gilbert	Western	Independent
The Texas Streak	Lynn Reynolds	Hoot Gibson, Blanche Mehaffey	Western	Universal
That Model from Paris	Louis J. Gasnier	Marceline Day, Bert Lytell	Comedy-Drama	Tiffany
That's My Baby	William Beaudine	Douglas MacLean, Margaret Morris	Comedy	Paramount
There You Are!	Edward Sedgwick	Conrad Nagel, Edith Roberts	Comedy	MGM
The Third Degree	Michael Curtiz	Dolores Costello, Louise Dresser, Rockliffe Fellowes	Romance	Warner Bros.
Three Faces East	Rupert Julian	Jetta Goudal, Robert Ames, Clive Brook	Spy drama	PDC
The Thrill Hunter	Eugene De Rue	William Haines, Kathryn McGuire, Alma Bennett	Comedy	Columbia
Thrilling Youth	Grover Jones	Billy West, Gloria Grey	Comedy	Rayart
The Timid Terror	Del Andrews	George O'Hara, Edith Yorke	Comedy	FBO
Tin Gods	Allan Dwan	Thomas Meighan, Renee Adoree, William Powell	Drama	Paramount
Tin Hats	Edward Sedgwick	Claire Windsor, Conrad Nagel	Comedy	MGM
Tom and His Pals	Robert De Lacey	Tom Tyler, Doris Hill	Action	FBO
Tony Runs Wild	Tom Buckingham	Tom Mix, Jacqueline Logan	Western	Fox Film
Too Much Money	John Francis Dillon	Lewis Stone, Anna Q. Nilsson	Comedy	First National
Torrent	Monta Bell	Greta Garbo, Ricardo Cortez, Gertrude Olmstead	Romance	MGM
The Tough Guy	David Kirkland	Fred Thomson, Lola Todd, Robert McKim	Western	FBO
The Traffic Cop	Harry Garson	Maurice 'Lefty' Flynn, Nigel Barrie	Drama	FBO
Tramp, Tramp, Tramp	Harry Edwards, Frank Capra	Harry Langdon, Joan Crawford	Comedy	First National
Transcontinental Limited	Nat Ross	Johnnie Walker, Eugenia Gilbert	Adventure	Independent
A Trip to Chinatown	Robert P. Kerr	Earle Foxe, Anna May Wong	Comedy	Fox Film
Trooper 77	Duke Worne	Herbert Rawlinson, Hazel Deane	Action	Rayart
Trumpin' Trouble	Richard Thorpe	Jay Wilsey, Alma Rayford	Western	Independent
The Trunk Mystery	Frank Hall Crane	Charles Hutchison, Alice Calhoun, Otto Lederer	Mystery	Pathé Exchange
The Truth About Men	Elmer Clifton	Edna Murphy, George Hackathorne, Alice Lake	Drama	Independent
The Truthful Sex	Richard Thomas	Mae Busch, Huntley Gordon	Comedy	Columbia
Twinkletoes	Charles Brabin	Colleen Moore, Kenneth Harlan	Romance	First National
Twisted Triggers	Richard Thorpe	Hal Taliaferro, Jean Arthur	Western	Independent
Two Can Play	Nat Ross	Allan Forrest, Clara Bow	Drama	Independent
The Two-Gun Man	David Kirkland	Fred Thomson, Olive Hasbrouck	Western	FBO
Typhoon Love	Norman Dawn	Mitchell Lewis, Ruth Clifford, Katherine Dawn	Drama	Independent

== U ==
Title	Director	Featured Cast	Genre	Note
Under Western Skies	Edward Sedgwick	Norman Kerry, Anne Cornwall, Ward Crane	Western	Universal
The Unfair Sex	Henri Diamant-Berger	Hope Hampton, Holbrook Blinn, Nita Naldi	Drama	Independent
The Unknown Cavalier	Albert S. Rogell	Ken Maynard, Kathleen Collins, David Torrence	Western	First National
Unknown Dangers	Grover Jones	Frank Merrill, Gloria Grey, Eddie Boland	Comedy	Independent
The Unknown Soldier	Renaud Hoffman	Charles Emmett Mack, Marguerite De La Motte, Henry B. Walthall	Drama	PDC
Unknown Treasures	Archie Mayo	Gladys Hulette, Robert Agnew, John Miljan	Horror	Independent
Unseen Enemies	J.P. McGowan	Al Hoxie, Claire Anderson, Max Asher	Western	Independent
The Untamed Lady	Frank Tuttle	Gloria Swanson, Lawrence Gray	Drama	Paramount
Up in Mabel's Room	E. Mason Hopper	Marie Prevost, Harrison Ford, Phyllis Haver	Comedy	PDC
Upstage	Monta Bell	Norma Shearer, Oscar Shaw, Dorothy Phillips	Romance	MGM

== V ==
Title	Director	Featured Cast	Genre	Note
Valencia	Dimitri Buchowetzki	Mae Murray, Lloyd Hughes	Romance	MGM
The Valley of Bravery	Jack Nelson	Bob Custer, Eugenia Gilbert	Western	FBO
The Virgin Wife	Elmer Clifton	Pauline Garon, Niles Welch, Kenneth Harlan	Drama	Independent
Volcano!	William K. Howard	Bebe Daniels, Ricardo Cortez, Wallace Beery	Drama	Paramount
The Volga Boatman	Cecil B. DeMille	William Boyd, Elinor Fair	Drama	PDC

== W ==
Title	Director	Featured Cast	Genre	Note
Walloping Kid	Robert J. Horner	William Barrymore, Jack Richardson, Frank Whitson	Western	Independent
The Waning Sex	Robert Z. Leonard	Norma Shearer, Conrad Nagel	Romantic comedy	MGM
War Paint	W. S. Van Dyke	Tim McCoy, Pauline Starke	Western	MGM
The Warning Signal	Charles J. Hunt	Gladys Hulette, Clarence Burton, Joseph W. Girard	Drama	Independent
Watch Your Wife	Svend Gade	Virginia Valli, Pat O'Malley, Nat Carr	Comedy drama	Universal
We're in the Navy Now	A. Edward Sutherland	Wallace Beery, Raymond Hatton, Chester Conklin	Comedy	Paramount
West of Broadway	Robert Thornby	Priscilla Dean, Majel Coleman	Comedy	PDC
West of the Law	Ben F. Wilson	Neva Gerber, Ashton Dearholt, Hal Walters	Western	Rayart
West of the Rainbow's End	Bennett Cohen	Jack Perrin, Pauline Curley	Western	Rayart
Western Pluck	Travers Vale	Art Acord, Marceline Day	Western	Universal
Wet Paint	Arthur Rosson	Raymond Griffith, Helene Costello, Bryant Washburn	Comedy	Paramount
What Happened to Jones	William A. Seiter	Reginald Denny, Marian Nixon	Comedy	Universal
What Price Glory?	Raoul Walsh	Edmund Lowe, Victor McLaglen, Dolores del Río	War	Fox Film
When Love Grows Cold	Harry O. Hoyt	Natacha Rambova, Clive Brook	Drama	FBO
When the Wife's Away	Frank R. Strayer	George K. Arthur, Dorothy Revier	Comedy	Columbia
While London Sleeps	Howard Bretherton	Rin Tin Tin, Helene Costello	Action	Warner Bros.
Whispering Smith	George Melford	H. B. Warner, Lillian Rich, John Bowers	Western	PDC
Whispering Wires	Albert Ray	Anita Stewart, Edmund Burns	Mystery	Fox Film
The White Black Sheep	Sidney Olcott	Richard Barthelmess, Patsy Ruth Miller, Constance Howard	Drama	First National
White Mice	Edward H. Griffith	Jacqueline Logan, William Powell	Drama	Independent
The Whole Town's Talking	Edward Laemmle	Edward Everett Horton, Virginia Lee Corbin, Trixie Friganza	Adventure comedy	Universal
Why Girls Go Back Home	James Flood	Patsy Ruth Miller, Clive Brook, Myrna Loy	Comedy	Warner Bros.
The Wild Horse Stampede	Clifford Smith	Jack Hoxie, Fay Wray, Marin Sais	Western	Universal
Wild Oats Lane	Marshall Neilan	Viola Dana, Robert Agnew	Drama	PDC
Wild to Go	Robert De Lacey	Tom Tyler, Frankie Darro, Eugenia Gilbert	Western	FBO
The Wilderness Woman	Howard Higgin	Aileen Pringle, Lowell Sherman, Henry Vibart	Comedy	First National
The Windjammer	Harry Joe Brown	Billy Sullivan, Thelma Hill, Billy Franey	Action	Rayart
Wings of the Storm	John G. Blystone	Virginia Brown Faire, Reed Howes	Drama	Fox Film
The Winner	Harry Joe Brown	Billy Sullivan, Lucille Hutton	Action	Rayart
The Winning of Barbara Worth	Henry King	Ronald Colman, Vilma Bánky, Gary Cooper	Western	United Artists
Winning the Futurity	Scott R. Dunlap	Cullen Landis, Clara Horton	Drama	Independent
The Winning Wallop	Charles Hutchison	William Fairbanks, Shirley Palmer, Charles K. French	Comedy	Gotham
The Wise Guy	Frank Lloyd	Mary Astor, Betty Compson	Crime	First National
With Davy Crockett at the Fall of the Alamo	Robert N. Bradbury	Cullen Landis, Kathryn McGuire	Western	Independent
Wives at Auction	Elmer Clifton	Edna Murphy, Gaston Glass, Arthur Donaldson	Drama	Independent
The Wives of the Prophet	James A. Fitzgerald	Orville Caldwell, Alice Lake, Violet Mersereau	Drama	Independent
The Wolf Hunters	Stuart Paton	Robert McKim, Virginia Brown Faire	Drama	Rayart
Wolves of the Desert	Ben F. Wilson	Neva Gerber, Ashton Dearholt	Western	Rayart
A Woman of the Sea	Josef von Sternberg	Edna Purviance, Raymond Bloomer	Drama	United Artists
A Woman's Heart	Phil Rosen	Enid Bennett, Gayne Whitman, Edward Earle	Drama	Independent
Womanpower	Harry Beaumont	Ralph Graves, Katherine Perry, Margaret Livingston	Comedy	Fox Film

== Y ==
Title	Director	Featured Cast	Genre	Note
The Yankee Señor	Emmett J. Flynn	Tom Mix, Olive Borden	Western	Fox Film
The Yellow Back	Del Andrews	Lotus Thompson, Claude Payton	Western	Universal
Yellow Fingers	Emmett J. Flynn	Olive Borden, Ralph Ince, Claire Adams	Drama	Fox Film
You Never Know Women	William A. Wellman	Florence Vidor, Lowell Sherman, Clive Brook	Romance	Paramount
You'd Be Surprised	Arthur Rosson	Raymond Griffith, Dorothy Sebastian	Mystery comedy	Paramount
Young April	Donald Crisp	Joseph Schildkraut, Rudolph Schildkraut, Bessie Love	Romance	PDC

== Shorts ==
Title	Director	Featured Cast	Genre	Note
Fool's Luck	Fatty Arbuckle	Lupino Lane, George Davis	Comedy	
His Private Life	Fatty Arbuckle	Lupino Lane, George Davis, Glen Cavender, Wallace Lupino	Comedy	
Home Cured	Fatty Arbuckle	Johnny Arthur, Virginia Vance, George Davis, Glen Cavender	Comedy	
Madame Mystery	Stan Laurel	Theda Bara, Oliver Hardy, James Finlayson	Comedy	
My Stars	Fatty Arbuckle	Johnny Arthur, Florence Lee	Comedy	
One Sunday Morning	Fatty Arbuckle	Lloyd Hamilton, Estelle Bradley, Stanley Blystone	Comedy	

== See also ==
- 1926 in American television
- 1926 in the United States
