= What Becomes of the Children? =

What Becomes of the Children? may refer to:

- What Becomes of the Children? (1918 film), a film directed by Walter Richard Stahl
- What Becomes of the Children? (1936 film), a film directed by Walter Shumway
