= John West Sinclair =

American actor

John West Sinclair (January 6, 1900 – February 13, 1945) was an American actor who worked primarily in silent films.

== Early life and career ==
Tennessee-born comedian Sinclair was a favorite stunt double for such 1920s action heroes as Ken Maynard, Billy Sullivan and Reed Howes. Later he wrote gags for W.C. Fields' comedies It's a Gift and Man on the Flying Trapeze, and had uncredited walk-on roles in several sound-era films.

Sinclair was married to actress Thelma Hill.

== Death ==
Sinclair died on February 13, 1945, of cirrhosis of the liver, at the age of 45. He is buried at Pierce Brothers Valhalla Memorial Park, in North Hollywood in a grave marked only by a brass plate with nothing engraved upon it.

== Partial filmography ==
- Fighting Fate (1925)
- Cyclone Cavalier (1925)
- High Spirits (1927)
- It Pays to Advertise (1931)
- Million Dollar Legs (1932)
- High Gear (1933)
- Kiss and Make-Up (1934)
- Car 99 (1935)
- Secret Service of the Air (1939)
- The Great American Broadcast (1941)
- All Through the Night (1942)
- They Got Me Covered (1943)
- Hail the Conquering Hero (1944)
