= Trail Dust (1924 film) =

1924 film

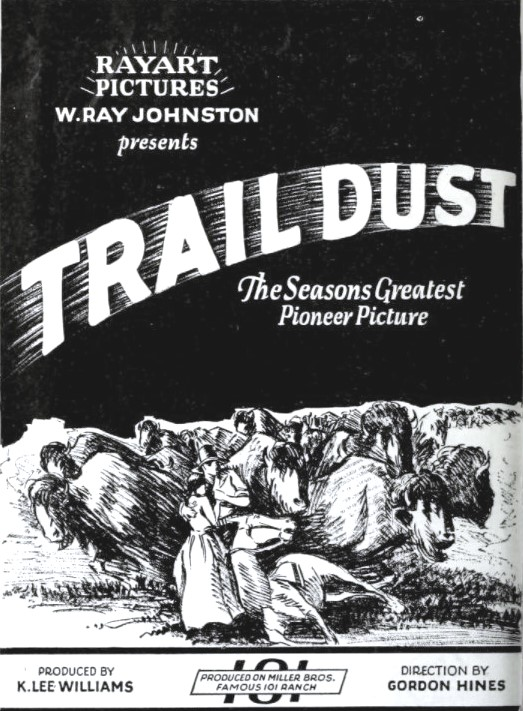
- Directed by: Gordon Hines
- Produced by: W. Ray Johnston
- Starring: David Dunbar
- Production company: Rayart Pictures
- Distributed by: Rayart Pictures
- Release date: November 11, 1924
- Running time: 59 minutes
- Country: United States
- Languages: Silent; English intertitles

Trail Dust is a 1924 American silent Western film directed by Gordon Hines and starring David Dunbar, Louise McComb and William Lenders. Portraying settlers in nineteenth century Oklahoma Territory, it was shot on location at the 101 Ranch in the state.

== Cast ==
- David Dunbar as Joe Paden
- Louise McComb as Meg Jordan
- William Lenders as Reverend Judson Lee
- Beth Ivins as Betty Lee
- Ralph W. Chambers as Church Logan
- Alfred Hewston as Horsefly Higgins
- Ray Howard as Chris Fast Bear
- Etha Ramsdell as Maggie Moon-Cow

== Bibliography ==
- John Wooley. Shot in Oklahoma: A Century of Sooner State Cinema. University of Oklahoma Press, 2012.
