= The Slanderers =

1924 film

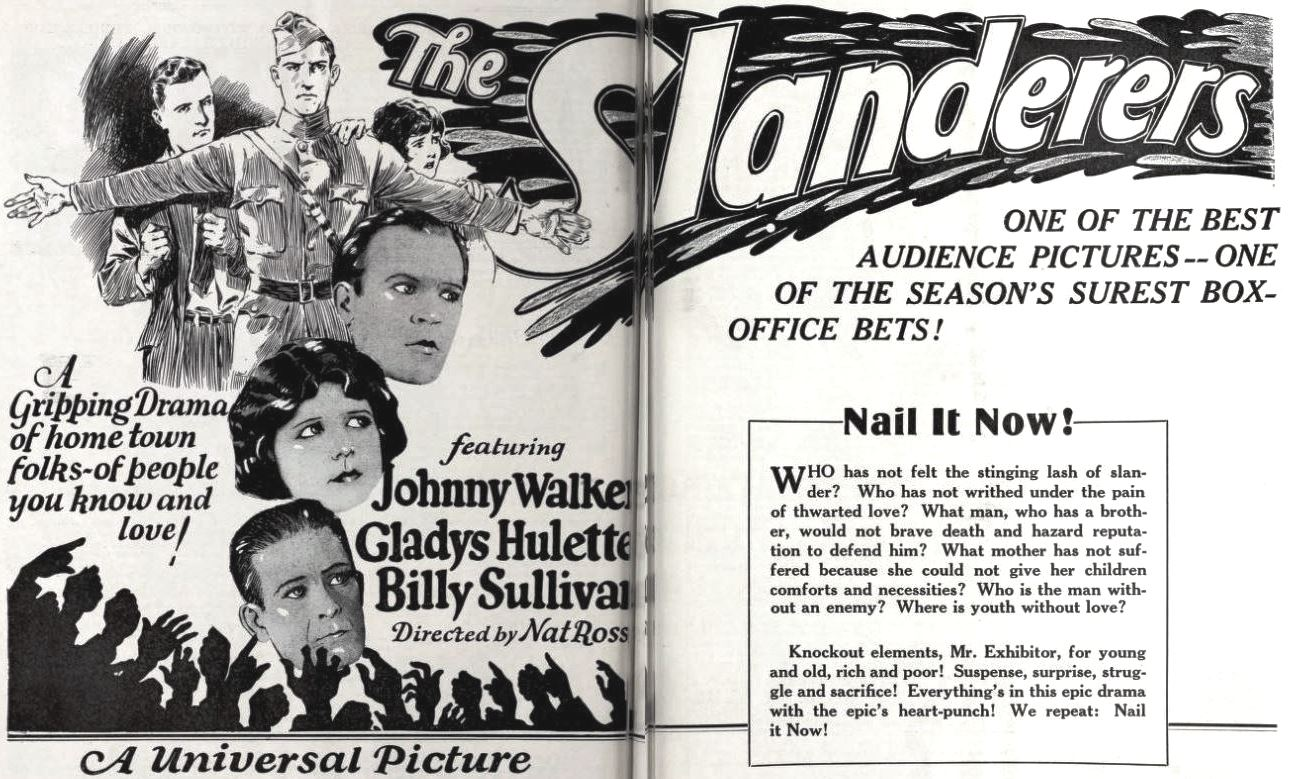
- Advertisement
- Directed by: Nat Ross
- Written by: Harvey Gates
- Based on: "Judgement of the West" by Valma Clark
- Starring: Johnnie Walker; Gladys Hulette; Billy Sullivan
- Production company: Universal Pictures
- Distributed by: Universal Pictures
- Release date: September 21, 1924
- Running time: 5 reels
- Country: United States
- Language: Silent (English intertitles)

The Slanderers is a 1924 American silent drama film directed by Nat Ross and starring Johnnie Walker, Gladys Hulette, and Billy Sullivan. The film was adapted for the screen by Harvey Gates based on a short story by Valma Clark titled "Judgement of the West."

== Cast ==
- Johnnie Walker as Johnny Calkins
- Gladys Hulette as Gladys Gray
- Billy Sullivan as Larry Calkins
- George Nichols as Todd Calkins
- Edith Yorke as Mrs. Calkins
- Philo McCullough as Jerome Keefe
- Margaret Landis as Ethel Davis
- Jack Morgan as Slim Kid
- Turner Savage as Fat Kid

== Preservation ==
The Slanderers was originally presumed lost, with the film cited by the National Film Preservation Board on their Lost U.S. Silent Feature Films list in February 2021. It has since been discovered, with a new restoration premiering at the American Cinematheque on September 12, 2026. https://www.americancinematheque.com/now-showing/help-yourself-the-slanderers-09-12-2026/

== Bibliography ==
- George A. Katchmer. A Biographical Dictionary of Silent Film Western Actors and Actresses. McFarland, 2009.
