= The Fear Fighter =

1925 film directed by Albert S. Rogell

- Directed by: Albert S. Rogell
- Written by: Grover Jones
- Produced by: Harry Joe Brown
- Starring: Billy Sullivan; Ruth Dwyer; J.P. McGowan
- Cinematography: Ross Fisher
- Production company: Harry J. Brown Productions
- Distributed by: Rayart Pictures
- Release date: September 1925
- Country: United States
- Languages: Silent; English intertitles

The Fear Fighter is a 1925 American silent comedy film directed by Albert S. Rogell and starring Billy Sullivan, Ruth Dwyer and J.P. McGowan.

== Cast ==
- Billy Sullivan as Billy Griffin
- Ruth Dwyer as Catherine Curtis
- J.P. McGowan as James Curtis
- Gunboat Smith as Prison Inmate
- Phil Salvadore
- W.C. Robinson
- Jack Herrick
- Billy Franey

== Bibliography ==
- Munden, Kenneth White. The American Film Institute Catalog of Motion Pictures Produced in the United States, Part 1. University of California Press, 1997.
