= Broadway Billy =

1926 film

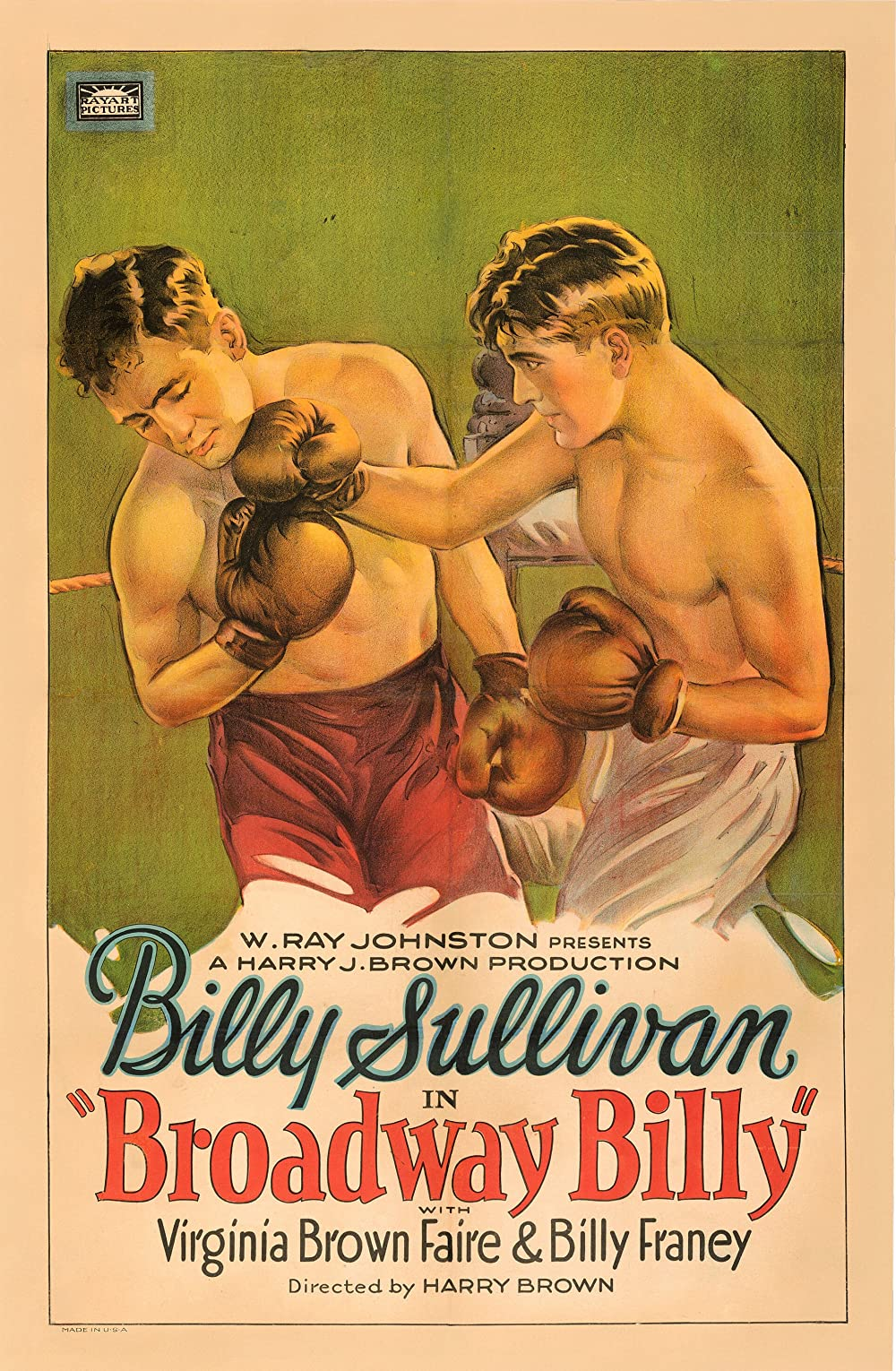
- Directed by: Harry Joe Brown
- Written by: Henry Roberts Symonds
- Produced by: Harry Joe Brown; W. Ray Johnston
- Starring: Billy Sullivan; Virginia Brown Faire; Jack Herrick
- Production company: Harry J. Brown Productions
- Distributed by: Rayart Pictures
- Release date: May 3, 1926
- Running time: 55 minutes
- Country: United States
- Languages: Silent; English intertitles

Broadway Billy is a 1926 American silent sports film directed by Harry Joe Brown and starring Billy Sullivan, Virginia Brown Faire and Jack Herrick. The film was once thought to be lost, but as of February 2021 it was noted by the Library of Congress as recently found.

== Cast ==
- Billy Sullivan as Billy Brooks
- Virginia Brown Faire as Phyliss Brooks
- Jack Herrick as Ace O'Brien
- Hazel Howell as Delorai

== Bibliography ==
- Munden, Kenneth White. The American Film Institute Catalog of Motion Pictures Produced in the United States, Part 1. University of California Press, 1997.
