= Speedy Smith (film) =

1927 film

- Directed by: Duke Worne
- Written by: Suzanne Avery
- Produced by: Duke Worne
- Starring: Billy Sullivan; Hazel Deane; Harry Tenbrook
- Cinematography: Ernest F. Smith
- Production company: Duke Worne Productions
- Distributed by: Rayart Pictures
- Release date: June 1927
- Running time: 50 minutes
- Country: United States
- Languages: Silent; English intertitles

Speedy Smith is a 1927 American silent drama film directed by Duke Worne and starring Billy Sullivan, Hazel Deane and Harry Tenbrook.

== Synopsis ==
In order to raise money for his girlfriend's mother to have a vital operation, Billy Smith accepts the challenge of boxer Slugger Sampson to last three rounds with him to win prize money.

== Cast ==
- Billy Sullivan as Billy Smith
- Hazel Deane as Tena Lucian
- Harry Tenbrook as Slugger Sampson
- Virginia True Boardman as Widow Lucian
- George Periolat as Charles C. Smith
- Arthur Thalasso as James Mortimer Dorfee

== Bibliography ==
- Munden, Kenneth White. The American Film Institute Catalog of Motion Pictures Produced in the United States, Part 1. University of California Press, 1997.
