= The Heart of a Coward =

1926 film

- Directed by: Duke Worne
- Produced by: Duke Worne; W. Ray Johnston
- Starring: Billy Sullivan
- Cinematography: Ernest Smith
- Distributed by: Rayart Pictures
- Release date: 1926 (US)
- Running time: 5 reels
- Country: United States
- Language: Silent..English titles

The Heart of a Coward is a 1926 silent adventure film directed by Duke Worne and starring Billy Sullivan.

== Plot ==
Love serves as the catalyst for the hero's awakening, prompting him to intervene just in time to thwart the villain's attempts to deceive the hero's elderly mother and elope with his beloved.

== Cast ==
- Billy Sullivan
- Charlotte Stevens
- Edith Yorke
- Jack Richardson
- Miles McCarthy
- Betty Baker

== Preservation status ==
- The film and its trailer survive in the Library of Congress collection.
