= Daring Deeds =

1927 film

- Directed by: Duke Worne
- Written by: George W. Pyper
- Produced by: Duke Worne
- Starring: Billy Sullivan; Molly Malone; Earl Metcalfe
- Cinematography: Ernest F. Smith
- Production company: Duke Worne Productions
- Distributed by: Rayart Pictures
- Release date: May 1927
- Running time: 60 minutes
- Country: United States
- Languages: Silent; English intertitles

Daring Deeds is a 1927 American silent comedy film directed by Duke Worne and starring Billy Sullivan, Molly Malone and Earl Metcalfe.

== Synopsis ==
After arguing with his father, an airplane manufacturer, William Gordon Jr. flies off in his plane in search of adventure. He manages to fall in love and win a transcontinental air race.

== Cast ==
- Billy Sullivan as William Gordon Jr
- Molly Malone as Helen Courtney
- Earl Metcalfe as Rance Sheldon
- Thomas G. Lingham as William Gordon Sr
- Robert Walker as Walter Sarles
- Lafe McKee as John Courtney
- Milburn Morante as 'Smudge' Rafferty
- Robert Littlefield as Mysterious Stranger

== Bibliography ==
- Munden, Kenneth White. The American Film Institute Catalog of Motion Pictures Produced in the United States, Part 1. University of California Press, 1997.
