= Fighting Fate =

1925 silent film

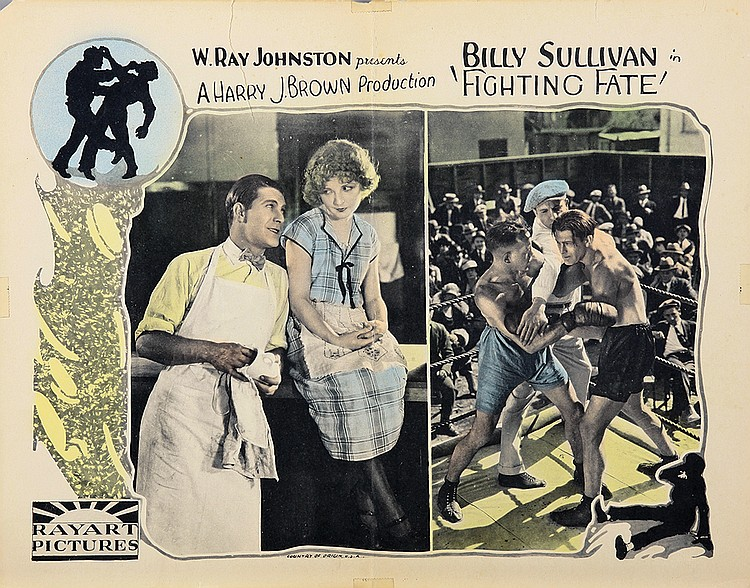
- Lobby card
- Directed by: Albert S. Rogell
- Written by: Henry Roberts Symonds; John Grey
- Produced by: Harry Joe Brown; W. Ray Johnston
- Starring: Billy Sullivan; Nancy Deaver; Tom McGuire
- Cinematography: H. Lyman Broening
- Production company: Harry J. Brown Productions
- Distributed by: Rayart Pictures
- Release date: October 9, 1925
- Running time: 50 minutes
- Country: United States
- Language: Silent (English intertitles)

Fighting Fate is a 1925 American silent sports film directed by Albert S. Rogell and starring Billy Sullivan, Nancy Deaver, and Tom McGuire.

== Plot ==
As described in a film magazine review, Damon Squires, aspiring lightweight boxer, broke while visiting a small town, resents an insult made to Sally O'Leary by a chap whom he knocks down. The latter turns out to be champion boxer Cyclone Winters. A boxing match is arranged with him, but Damon is doped by a bribed trainer and loses the fight. Sally, whose father runs a restaurant, still believes in Damon. Damon obtains proof that he had been double-crossed. In a second match he knocks Winters out, winning the championship and the affection of Sally.

== Cast ==
- Billy Sullivan as Damon Squires - The Fighter
- John Sinclair as Pythias - The Manager
- Nancy Deaver as Sally O'Leary - The Girl
- Tom McGuire as Danny O'Leary
- Phil Salvadore as Cyclone Winters - The Opponent
- William Buckley as Glen Morgan
- Ford West as Lew Muggins

== Bibliography ==
- Munden, Kenneth White. The American Film Institute Catalog of Motion Pictures Produced in the United States, Part 1. University of California Press, 1997.
