= Smiling Billy =

1927 film

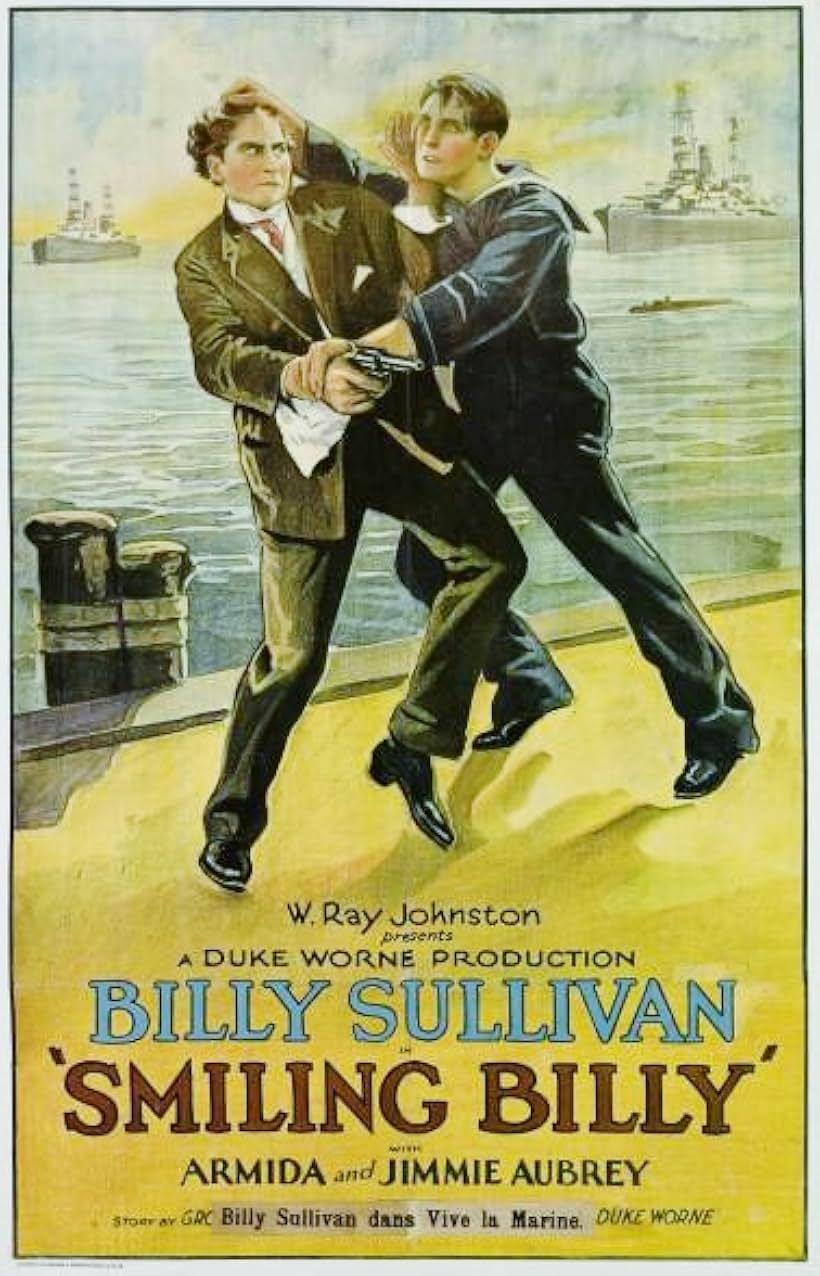
- Directed by: Duke Worne
- Produced by: Duke Worne
- Starring: Billy Sullivan; Armida; Jimmy Aubrey
- Cinematography: Ernest F. Smith
- Production company: Duke Worne Productions
- Distributed by: Rayart Pictures
- Release date: January 1927
- Running time: 50 minutes
- Country: United States
- Languages: Silent; English intertitles

Smiling Billy is a 1927 American silent action film directed by Duke Worne and starring Billy Sullivan, Armida and Jimmy Aubrey.

Three American sailors on shore leave from the Pacific Fleet discover that a crazed inventor plans to launch an attack on the fleet and set out to thwart his plans.

== Selected cast ==
- Billy Sullivan as Billy
- Armida as Billy's sweetheart
- Jimmy Aubrey

== Bibliography ==
- Connelly, Robert B. The Silents: Silent Feature Films, 1910-36, Volume 40, Issue 2. December Press, 1998.
