= Goat Getter =

1925 film directed by Albert S. Rogell

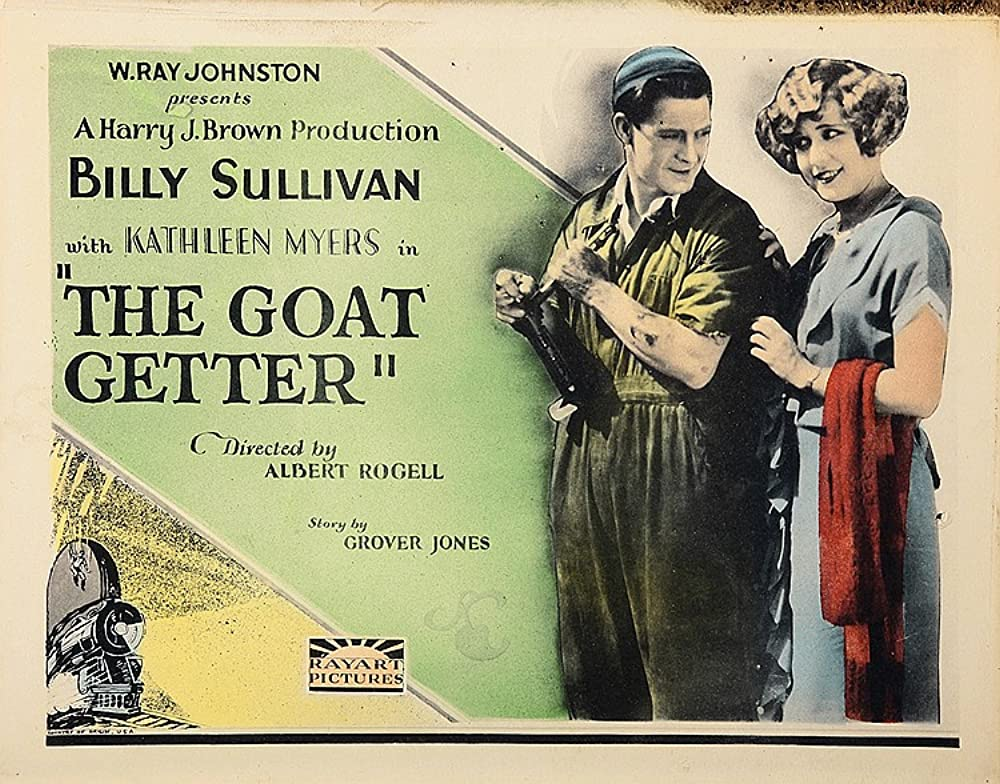
- Directed by: Albert S. Rogell
- Written by: Grover Jones
- Produced by: Harry Joe Brown
- Starring: Billy Sullivan; John Sinclair; Kathleen Myers
- Cinematography: Lee Garmes
- Production company: Harry J. Brown Productions
- Distributed by: Rayart Pictures
- Release date: August 25, 1925
- Running time: 50 minutes
- Country: United States
- Languages: Silent; English intertitles

Goat Getter is a 1925 American silent action film directed by Albert S. Rogell and starring Billy Sullivan, John Sinclair and Kathleen Myers.

== Cast ==
- Billy Sullivan as Billy Morris
- John Sinclair as Pie-Eye Pickens
- Kathleen Myers as Virginia Avery
- Virginia Vance as Mamie Arthur
- Eddie Diggins as Lightning Bradley
- William Buckley as Carter Bond
- Joe Moore as Slug Geever

== Bibliography ==
- James Robert Parish & Michael R. Pitts. Film directors: a guide to their American films. Scarecrow Press, 1974.
