= Speed Crazed =

1926 film

- Directed by: Duke Worne
- Written by: Suzanne Avery; Grover Jones
- Produced by: W. Ray Johnston
- Starring: Billy Sullivan; Andrée Tourneur; Joseph W. Girard
- Cinematography: King D. Gray
- Production company: Duke Worne Productions
- Distributed by: Rayart Pictures; Wardour Films (UK)
- Release date: November 3, 1926
- Running time: 58 minutes
- Country: United States
- Language: Silent

Speed Crazed is a 1926 American silent sports action film directed by Duke Worne and starring Billy Sullivan, Andrée Tourneur and Joseph W. Girard.

== Synopsis ==
A man is forced to be a getaway driver for a criminal gang. Arrested he manages to escape and flee town. Later, after becoming a racing driver his former connections come back to haunt him.

== Cast ==
- Billy Sullivan as Billy Meeks
- Andrée Tourneur as Eloise Harfer
- Joseph W. Girard as Maclyn Harfer
- Harry Maynard as Mr. Payton
- Albert J. Smith as Dave Marker

== Bibliography ==
- Munden, Kenneth White. The American Film Institute Catalog of Motion Pictures Produced in the United States, Part 1. University of California Press, 1997.
