= What Becomes of the Children? (1918 film) =

- Directed by: Walter Richard Stahl
- Screenplay by: Corra Beach (scenario)
- Starring: Walter Shumway; Corra Beach; Morgan Jones
- Cinematography: Eugene De Tousard French
- Production company: Corra Beach Pictures Corp.
- Release date: November 1918 (US)
- Running time: 6 reels
- Country: United States
- Language: English

What Becomes of the Children? is a 1918 American silent film directed by Walter Richard Stahl, with a scenario by Corra Beach. It stars Walter Shumway, Corra Beach, and Morgan Jones.

== Cast ==
- Walter Shumway as Howard Trayne
- Corra Beach as Mrs. Trayne
- Morgan Jones as Lawyer
- Billy Sullivan as Fred, the son
- Gladys Dore as Marion, the daughter
- Louise Westner as Nurse
- Grace Stevens as Friend

== Notes ==
Shumway directed the remake of the film in 1936, under the same title.
