= Rayart Pictures =

American film studio

- Type: Film production
- Industry: Entertainment
- Founded: 1924; 102 years ago
- Founder: W. Ray Johnston
- Defunct: 1930; 96 years ago
- Successors: Monogram Pictures; Allied Artists

Rayart Pictures was one of the early film production and distribution companies, independent from the major Hollywood studios in the United States, during the later silent film era from the mid-to-late 1920s and into the sound era in 1929 and 1930.

Rayart was established by W. Ray Johnston in 1924, after whom the company was named. It was a producer and distributor of low-budget films for smaller theaters, and like the other so-called Poverty Row studios, was based in a small plot off Sunset Strip, by Gower Street.

In 1929 Rayart entered the new field of sound pictures, releasing the first feature-length talking western Overland Bound, featuring silent stars Leo Maloney and Allene Ray. Its success prompted Ray Johnston to establish a subsidiary, Raytone Talking Pictures, Inc., reflecting the new sound-film technology (like Fox Film's Movietone). Raytone scored an early coup by acquiring some of Walt Disney's Alice Comedies series from Winkler Pictures and reissuing them with synchronized music and sound effects, releasing them under their Syndicate Pictures label.

Johnston, noting the popularity of movie musicals, rented the Metropolitan studio in Fort Lee, New Jersey and filmed "several talking shorts every week". One of them, Campus Sweetheart, was filmed in July 1929 and featured the young Ginger Rogers (billed fifth). Several of the Raytone shorts, among them Pep and Personality, Jazzmania, and College Pep, featured Tommy Christian and His Palisades Orchestra; Christian was the house bandleader at the Palisades amusement park ballroom in Cliffside Park, New Jersey. Johnston expanded one of the Tommy Christian shorts into a seven-reel feature, Howdy Broadway, filmed in September 1929. Christian, appearing as himself, played a college bandleader hoping for success on Broadway. "The entire budget likely did not exceed the cost of Bessie Love's sequined top hat in Broadway Melody", smirked historian Richard Barrios, "and this type of musical-at-any-cost madness shows how vigorous the public's yen for backstage films was perceived to be."

Johnston merged Rayart and Raytone into a new company, Continental Pictures, then Syndicate Pictures, and finally (in March 1931) Monogram Pictures. Johnston was president, with his Rayart colleague Trem Carr as vice president. With Johnston at the helm, Monogram became a prolific producer of low-budget Hollywood features. Johnston was the studio's president until 1945, when he became chairman of the board; he served in that capacity for Monogram and its successor Allied Artists until 1963.

== Filmography ==
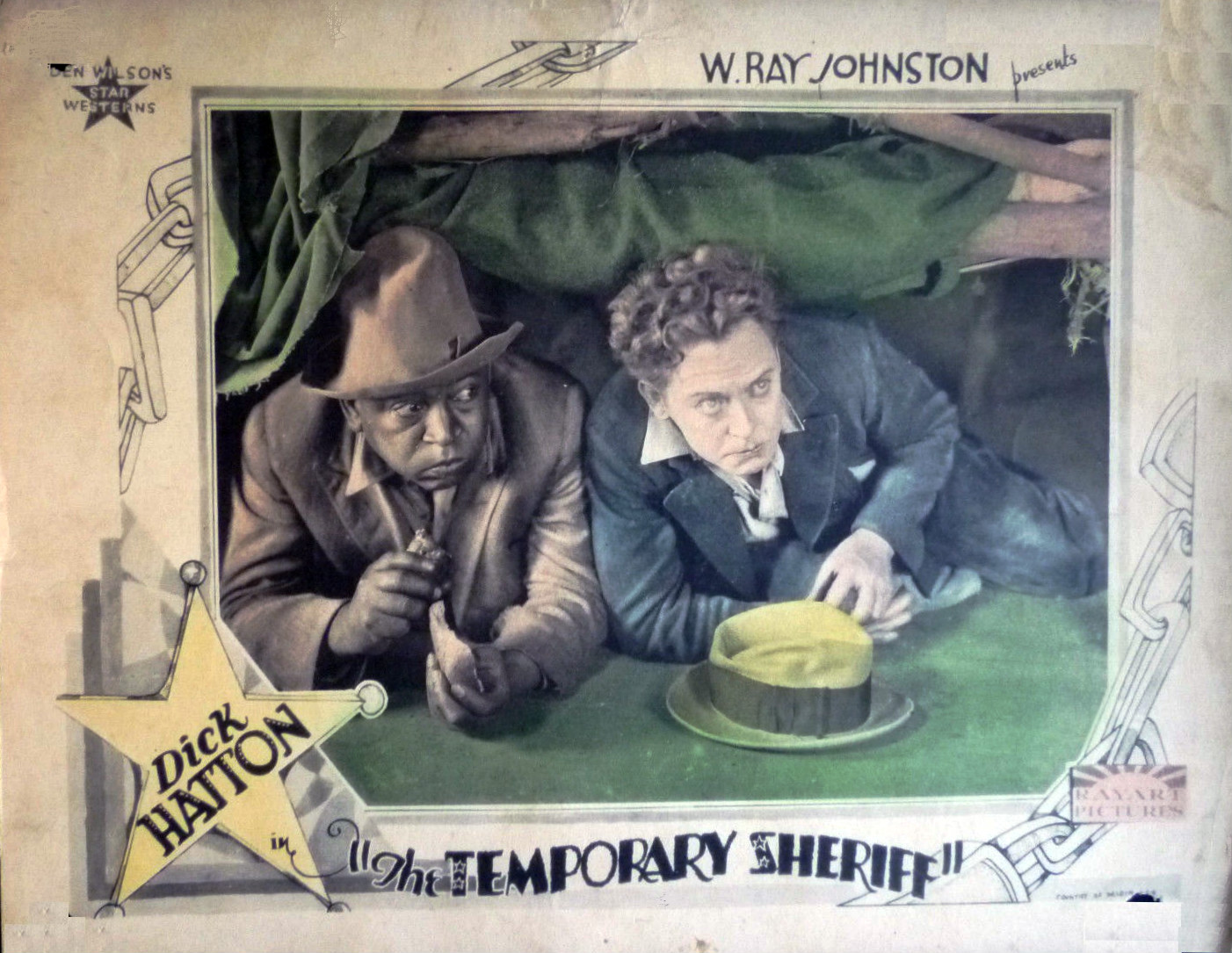
The Temporary Sheriff Lobby Card

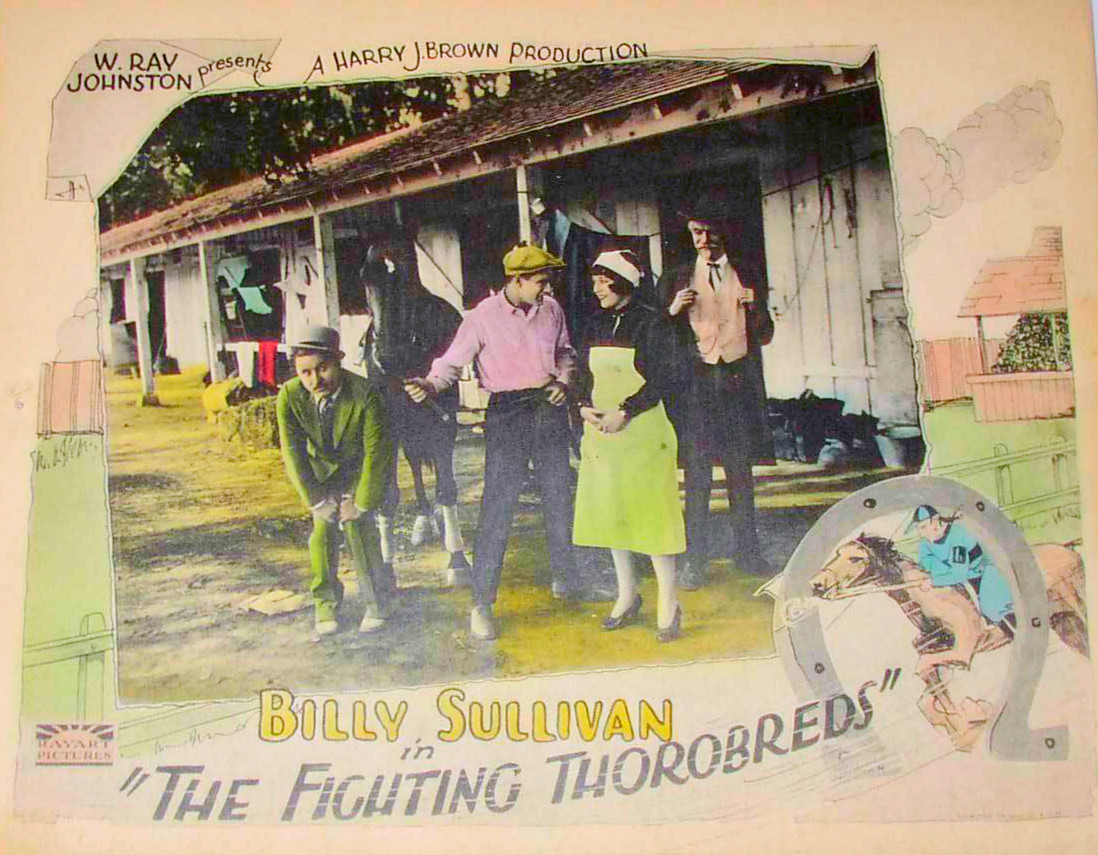
The Fighting Thorobreds lobby card

- Midnight Secrets (1924)
- The Street of Tears (1924)
- For Another Woman (1924)
- The Pell Street Mystery (1924)
- Trail Dust (1924)
- Lightning Romance (1924)
- Geared to Go (1924)
- Double Fisted (1925)
- Ace of Clubs (1925)
- Buried Gold (1925)
- The Pride of the Force (1925)
- Cyclone Cavalier (1925)
- The Right Man (1925)
- The Fear Fighter (1925)
- Bashful Buccaneer (1925)
- Fighting Luck (1925)
- The Road Agent (1925)
- Goat Getter (1925)
- The Knockout Kid (1925)
- Starlight, the Untamed (1925)
- The Flame Fighter (1925)
- Border Vengeance (1925)
- Mistaken Orders (1925)
- Fighting Fate (1925)
- Secret Service Sanders (1925)
- Super Speed (1925)
- Winning a Woman (1925)
- Crack o' Dawn (1925)
- Dangerous Fists (1925)
- Once in a Lifetime (1925)
- The Snob Buster (1925)
- A Desperate Chance (1925)
- Youth's Gamble (1925)
- Getting 'Em Right (1925)
- Easy Money (1925)
- The Wolf Hunters (1926)
- The Dixie Flyer (1926)
- Temporary Sheriff (1926)
- One Punch O'Day (1926)
- The Midnight Limited (1926)
- Somebody's Mother (1926)
- Perils of the Coast Guard (1926)
- Phantom Police (1926)
- Broadway Billy (1926)
- The Self Starter (1926)
- Moran of the Mounted (1926)
- Danger Quest (1926)
- The Patent Leather Pug (1926)
- West of Rainbow's End (1926)
- The Heart of a Coward (1926)
- The Fighting Thorobreds (1926)
- Mystery Pilot (1926)
- The Windjammer (1926)
- The Call of the Klondike (1926)
- The Lost Trail (1926)
- The Dangerous Dude (1926)
- The Last Alarm (1926)
- Thrilling Youth (1926)
- The Man from Oklahoma (1926)
- Racing Romance (1926)
- Crossed Signals (1926)
- The Baited Trap (1926)
- The High Flyer (1926)
- Scotty of the Scouts (1926)
- Kentucky Handicap (1926)
- Rapid Fire Romance (1926)
- Oh Billy, Behave (1926)
- The Winner (1926)
- Speed Crazed (1926)
- The Smoke Eaters (1926)
- A Captain's Courage (1926)
- Tentacles of the North (1926)
- Trooper 77 (1926)
- Speed Cop (1926)
- Wolves of the Desert (1926)
- Hi-Jacking Rustlers (1926)
- Stick to Your Story (1926)
- The Night Owl (1926)
- The Grey Devil (1926)
- The Gallant Fool (1926)
- West of the Law (1926)
- Sheriff's Girl (1926)
- Fighting for Fame (1927)
- The Mystery Brand (1927)
- The Scorcher (1927)
- Speeding Hoofs (1927)
- The Show Girl (1927)
- Where North Holds Sway (1927)
- A Yellow Streak (1927)
- The Laffin' Fool (1927)
- The Midnight Watch (1927)
- Riders of the West (1927)
- The Lost Limited (1927)
- The Range Riders (1927)
- Western Courage (1927)
- Thunderbolt's Tracks (1927)
- Code of the Range (1927)
- Speedy Smith (1927)
- The Racing Fool (1927)
- Ridin' Luck (1927)
- Smiling Billy (1927)
- A Wanderer of the West (1927)
- The Silent Hero (1927)
- The Cruise of the Hellion (1927)
- A Boy of the Streets (1927)
- Gun-Hand Garrison (1927)
- Prince of the Plains (1927)
- The King of the Jungle (1927)
- Heroes in Blue (1927)
- On the Stroke of Twelve (1927)
- Casey Jones (1927)
- Wild Born (1927)
- The Royal American (1927)
- Daring Deeds (1927)
- Modern Daughters (1927)
- Romantic Rogue (1927)
- A Light in the Window (1927)
- The Wheel of Destiny (1927)
- When Seconds Count (1927)
- Gypsy of the North (1928)
- You Can't Beat the Law (1928)
- The Law and the Man (1928)
- The Phantom of the Turf (1928)
- My Home Town (1928)
- The Painted Trail (1928)
- Danger Patrol (1928)
- Mystery Valley (1928)
- Sweet Sixteen (1928)
- The City of Purple Dreams (1928)
- The Branded Man (1928)
- Trail Riders (1928)
- Lightnin' Shot (1928)
- The Devil's Tower (1928)
- Trailin' Back (1928)
- Ships of the Night (1928)
- The Black Pearl (1928)
- The Man from Headquarters (1928)
- The Divine Sinner (1928)
- The Midnight Adventure (1928)
- Sisters of Eve (1928)
- Isle of Lost Men (1928)
- Should a Girl Marry? (1928)
- The Heart of Broadway (1928)
- Some Mother's Boy (1929)
- Handcuffed (1929)
- Bride of the Desert (1929)
- Howdy Broadway (1929)
- Brothers (1929)
- The Devil's Chaplain (1929)
- Anne Against the World (1929)
- Overland Bound (1929)
- When Dreams Come True (1929)
- Shanghai Rose (1929)
- Two Sisters (1929)
- Beyond the Law (1930)
- Near the Rainbow's End (1930)
