= One Punch O'Day =

1926 film

- Directed by: Harry Joe Brown
- Written by: Henry Roberts Symonds
- Produced by: Harry Joe Brown
- Starring: Billy Sullivan; Charlotte Merriam; Jack Herrick
- Production company: Harry J. Brown Productions
- Distributed by: Rayart Pictures
- Release date: July 28, 1926
- Running time: 50 minutes
- Country: United States
- Language: Silent

One Punch O'Day is a 1926 American silent sports action film directed by Harry Joe Brown and starring Billy Sullivan, Charlotte Merriam and Jack Herrick. It was distributed by the independent Rayart Pictures, the forerunner of Monogram Pictures.

== Synopsis ==
A young boxer has the whole weight of his town on his shoulders ahead of a major fight.

== Cast ==
- Billy Sullivan as Jimmy O'Day
- Charlotte Merriam as Alice Felton
- Jack Herrick as Joe Hemingway
- William Malan as Elwood Felton
- J.C. Fowler as Charles Hargreaves
- Eddie Diggins as Kid Martin

== Bibliography ==
- Institute, American Film (1997). The American Film Institute Catalog of Motion Pictures Produced in the United States. University of California Press. ISBN 978-0-520-20969-5.
