= Stick to Your Story =

1926 film

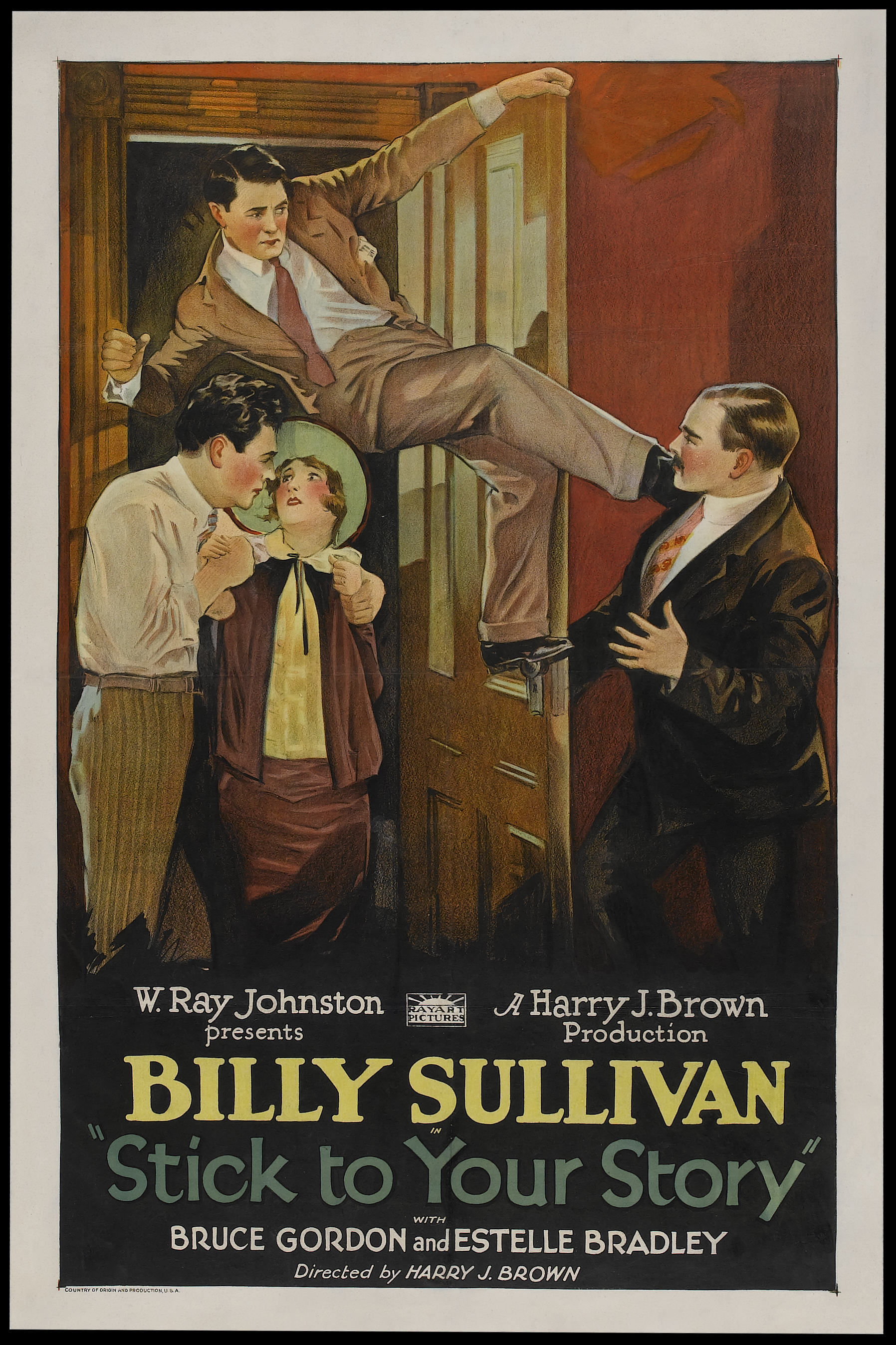
- Directed by: Harry Joe Brown
- Written by: Arthur Q. Hagerman; Ralph O. Murphy; Henry Roberts Symonds
- Produced by: Harry Joe Brown; W. Ray Johnston
- Starring: Billy Sullivan; Bruce Gordon; Melbourne MacDowell
- Production company: Harry J. Brown Productions
- Distributed by: Rayart Pictures
- Release date: December 16, 1926
- Running time: 50 minutes
- Country: United States
- Languages: Silent; English intertitles

Stick to Your Story is a 1926 American silent action film directed by Harry Joe Brown and starring Billy Sullivan, Bruce Gordon and Melbourne MacDowell. It was distributed by the independent Rayart Pictures, the forerunner of Monogram Pictures.

== Synopsis ==
The film follows the adventures of a cub reporter whose impetuous manner almost gets him fired by his editor.

== Cast ==
- Billy Sullivan as Scoop Martin
- Bruce Gordon as Whipple
- Estelle Bradley as Peggy Miles
- Melbourne MacDowell as Colonel Miles
- Jack McHugh as Copy O'Hara
- Barney Furey as Number Seven
- Harry Semels as Fanatic
- Richard Lewis as Reverend Brown

== Bibliography ==
- Munden, Kenneth White. The American Film Institute Catalog of Motion Pictures Produced in the United States, Part 1. University of California Press, 1997.
