= The Grey Devil =

1926 film

- Directed by: Bennett Cohen
- Written by: Henry Ziegler
- Starring: Jack Perrin; Lorraine Eason; Tom London
- Cinematography: William Thornley
- Production company: George Blaisdell Productions
- Distributed by: Rayart Pictures
- Release date: 1926
- Country: United States
- Languages: Silent; English intertitles

The Grey Devil is a 1926 American silent Western film directed by Bennett Cohen and starring Jack Perrin, Lorraine Eason and Tom London.

== Cast ==
- Jack Perrin as Jim Stewart
- Lorraine Eason as Helen
- Tom London as Otis Mason
- Andrew Waldron
- Jerome La Grasse
- Milburn Morante
- Starlight the Horse as The Grey Devil
- Rex the "Movie Collie"
