= The Winner (1926 film) =

1926 silent film

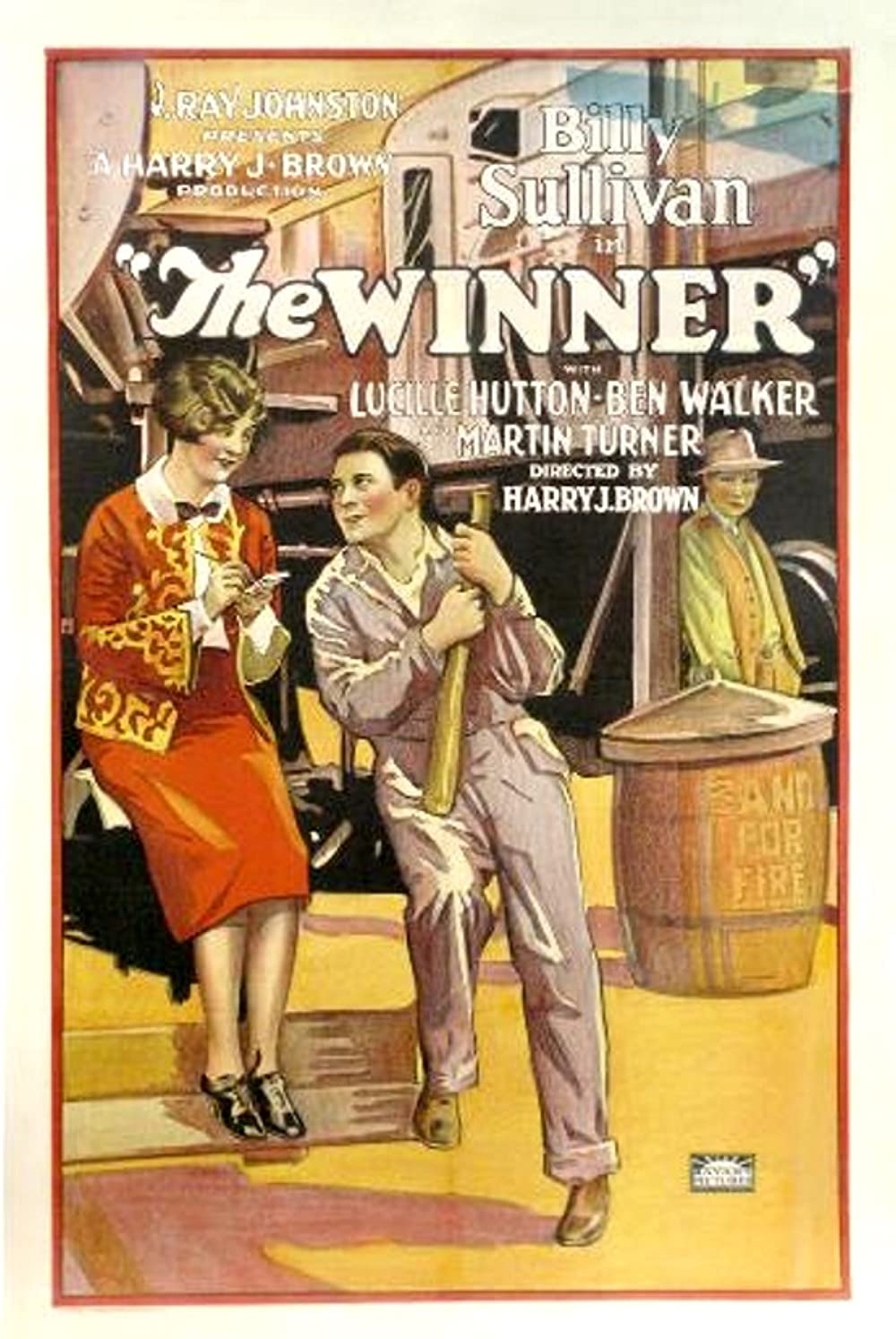
- Directed by: Harry Joe Brown
- Written by: F. McGrew Willis
- Produced by: W. Ray Johnston; Harry Joe Brown
- Starring: Billy Sullivan; Lucille Hutton; Ben Walker
- Production company: Harry J. Brown Productions
- Distributed by: Rayart Pictures
- Release date: October 28, 1926
- Running time: 58 minutes
- Country: United States
- Languages: Silent; English intertitles

The Winner is a 1926 American silent action film directed by Harry Joe Brown and starring Billy Sullivan, Lucille Hutton and Ben Walker.

== Cast ==
- Billy Sullivan as Scotty MacTavish
- Lucille Hutton as Patsy Thorne
- Ben Walker as Ben Reader
- Martin Turner as Scotty's Second
- Tom O'Brien as Slugger Martin
- George B. Williams as Archer Thorne

== Bibliography ==
- Munden, Kenneth White. The American Film Institute Catalog of Motion Pictures Produced in the United States, Part 1. University of California Press, 1997.
