= Thrilling Youth =

1926 film

- Directed by: Grover Jones
- Written by: Grover Jones
- Starring: Billy West; Gloria Grey; Charles Clary
- Cinematography: George Crocker
- Production company: Billy West Productions
- Distributed by: Rayart Pictures
- Release date: August 3, 1926
- Running time: 5 reels
- Country: United States
- Language: Silent (English intertitles)

Thrilling Youth is a 1926 American silent comedy film directed by Grover Jones and starring Billy West, Gloria Grey, and Charles Clary.

== Plot ==
As described in a film magazine review, when Billy Davis leaves college and arrives home after a wild going-away party, he finds that his dad is in financial trouble. Billy goes to work to make their bakery business a success. He is in love with Mary Bryson, whose father is a big competitor in the bread business. Bryson's secretary bribes the Davis foreman to put cement in the bread. Billy, warned by Mary after she discovers a cement truck, informs his customers of the dirty trick by an airplane sky-written message. Bryson denounces his secretary for this underhand plotting and the latter is severely beaten by Billy, whose romance with Mary is happily concluded.

== Cast ==
- Billy West as Billy Davis
- Gloria Grey as Mary Bryson
- George Bunny as Billy's Father
- Charles Clary as Thomas Bryson
- John J. Richardson as Bryson's Secretary
- Span Kennedy as Detective
- Joseph Smith as Vallman

== Bibliography ==
- Munden, Kenneth White. The American Film Institute Catalog of Motion Pictures Produced in the United States, Part 1. University of California Press, 1997.
