= Speed Cop =

1926 film by Duke Worne

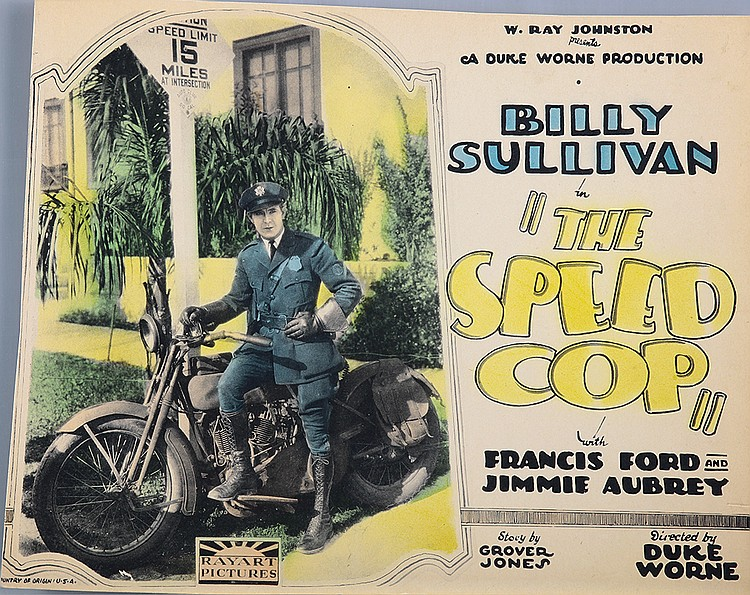
- Directed by: Duke Worne
- Written by: Grover Jones
- Starring: Billy Sullivan; Rose Blossom; Francis Ford
- Cinematography: Ernest F. Smith
- Production company: Duke Worne Productions
- Distributed by: Rayart Pictures
- Release date: November 1926
- Running time: 50 minutes
- Country: United States
- Languages: Silent; English intertitles

Speed Cop is a 1926 American silent action film directed by Duke Worne and starring Billy Sullivan, Rose Blossom and Francis Ford.

== Cast ==
- Billy Sullivan
- Rose Blossom.
- Francis Ford

== Bibliography ==
- Munden, Kenneth White. The American Film Institute Catalog of Motion Pictures Produced in the United States, Part 1. University of California Press, 1997.
