= The Patent Leather Pug =

1925 silent film

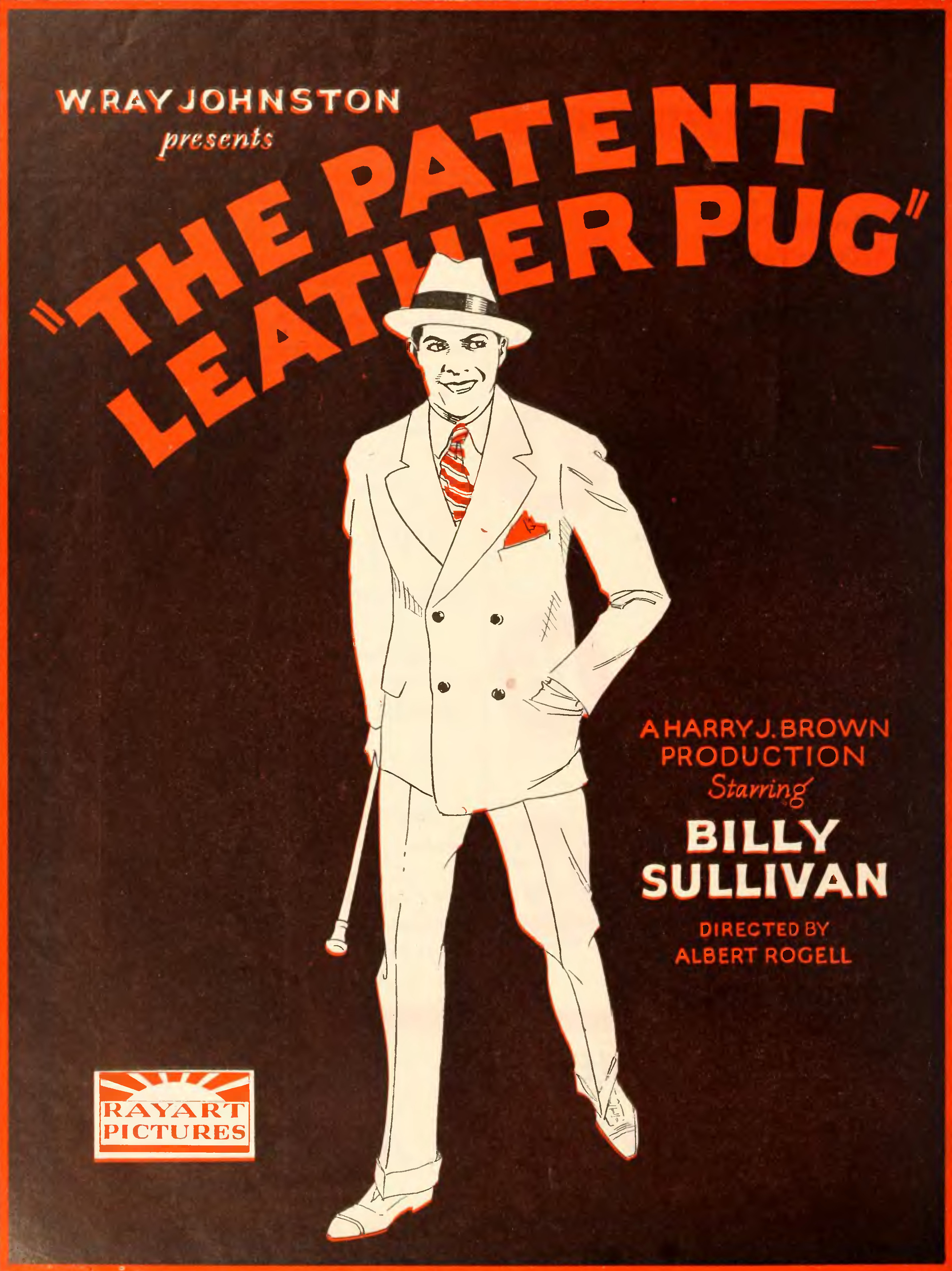
- Advertisement
- Directed by: Albert S. Rogell
- Written by: Grover Jones
- Produced by: Harry Joe Brown
- Starring: Billy Sullivan; Ruth Dwyer; J.P. McGowan
- Production company: Harry J. Brown Productions
- Distributed by: Rayart Pictures
- Release dates: November 23, 1925 (U.K.); January 21, 1926 (U.S.)
- Running time: 50 minutes
- Country: United States
- Language: Silent (English intertitles)

The Patent Leather Pug is a 1925 American silent sports drama film directed by Albert S. Rogell and starring Billy Sullivan, Ruth Dwyer, and J.P. McGowan. Completed in 1925, it first premiered in London under the alternative title A Desperate Finish before going on general release in the United States in January 1926.

== Cast ==
- Billy Sullivan as Billy Griffin
- Ruth Dwyer as Catherine Curtis
- J.P. McGowan as James Curtis
- Gloria Grey
- Vivian Vance
- John Sinclair
- Melbourne MacDowell
- Kit Guard
- Hayden Stevenson
- Eddie Diggins

== Bibliography ==
- Munden, Kenneth White. The American Film Institute Catalog of Motion Pictures Produced in the United States, Part 1. University of California Press, 1997.
