= Harry Joe Brown =

American film director (1890–1972)

- Born: Henry Joseph Brown; September 22, 1890; Pittsburgh, Pennsylvania, U.S.
- Died: April 28, 1972 (aged 81); Palm Springs, California, U.S.
- Occupations: Film producer, film director
- Spouse(s): Sally Eilers (m. 1933; div. 1943) Dorothy Gray (m. 1953)
- Children: 1

Harry Joe Brown (born Henry Joseph Brown; September 22, 1890 – April 28, 1972) was an American film producer, and earlier a theatre and film director.

== Early years ==
Harry Joe Brown was born in 1890 in Pittsburgh, Pennsylvania. He grew up in Benton Harbor, Michigan, and graduated from Benton Harbor High School. He graduated with a bachelor of law degree from Syracuse University after attending the University of Michigan, where he studied dentistry for one year. His involvement with theatrical productions at Syracuse turned his career interests from law to entertainment. He was a captain in the infantry in World War I.

== Career ==
Brown worked with newspapers before he began working in films in 1920. After producing for the Equity Company he went to Hollywood to make Westerns for Monogram Pictures.

As a producer, he had a partnership with director Budd Boetticher, actor Randolph Scott and screenwriter Burt Kennedy, which generated a series of five westerns between 1957 and 1960 (The Tall T, Decision at Sundown, Buchanan Rides Alone, Ride Lonesome, Comanche Station) via a company he created with Scott which eventually became known as Ranown Pictures Corp. He produced the American debut films of both Errol Flynn in Captain Blood and Sean Flynn in Son of Captain Blood.

Brown earlier directed a number of films, among them Knickerbocker Holiday, Sitting Pretty and Madison Square Garden.

== Personal life and death ==
He married actress Sally Eilers on September 24, 1933, in Yuma, Arizona, and they had a son. They were divorced on August 26, 1943. He married Dorothy Gray in 1953. They resided in a mansion located at 625 Mountain Drive, Beverly Hills, California.

Brown died of a heart attack on April 28, 1972, aged 78, in Palm Springs, California.

== Selected filmography ==
- North of Nevada (1924)
- Galloping Gallagher (1924)
- The Mask of Lopez (1924)
- The Silent Stranger (1924)
- The Dangerous Coward (1924)
- The Fighting Sap (1924)
- Bashful Buccaneer (1925)
- The Fear Fighter (1925)
- Youth's Gamble (1925)
- Fighting Fate (1925)
- Goat Getter (1925)
- The Patent Leather Pug (1925)
- Rapid Fire Romance (1926)
- Moran of the Mounted (1926)
- The High Flyer (1926)
- Racing Romance (1926)
- The Night Owl (1926)
- Kentucky Handicap (1926)
- The Winner (1926)
- Broadway Billy (1926)
- Stick to Your Story (1926)
- The Self Starter (1926)
- One Punch O'Day (1926)
- The Dangerous Dude (1926)
- Gun Gospel (1927)
- The Scorcher (1927)
- The Royal American (1927)
- The Racing Fool (1927)
- The Lost Limited (1927)
- Romantic Rogue (1927)
- The Wagon Show (1928)
- The Glorious Trail (1928)
- The Code of the Scarlet (1928)
- The Squealer (1930)
