= W. Ray Johnston =

American film producer

William Ray Johnston
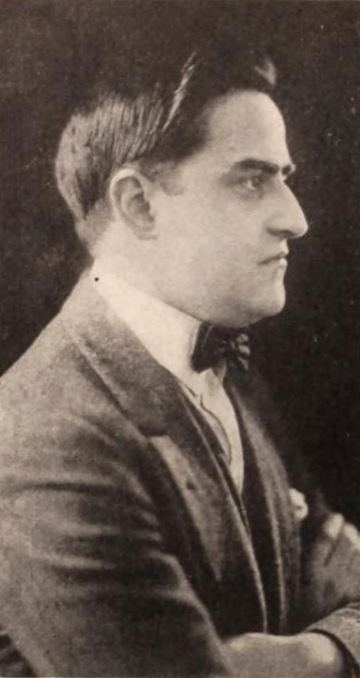
- Born: William Ray Johnston; January 2, 1892; Bristow, Iowa, U.S.
- Died: October 14, 1966 (aged 74); Los Angeles, California, U.S.
- Occupation: Film producer
- Years active: 1924–1935 (producer); 1937–1963 (executive)

William Ray Johnston (January 2, 1892 – October 14, 1966) was an American film producer. He was associated with low-budget filmmaking, in particular with Rayart Pictures and Monogram Pictures.

== Early career ==
Johnston started in the newspaper business, working for the Waterloo Daily Reporter in Waterloo, Iowa. He began his motion-picture career in 1914 with the Thanhouser studios in Jacksonville, Florida (as an actor) and in New Rochelle, New York (as the company treasurer). In 1916 he was hired by Dr. William E. Shallenberger of Arrow Film Corporation. Arrow specialized in low-budgeted action fare for small neighborhood theaters, including feature films and comedy shorts. (Arrow is remembered today for its comedies with silent stars Billy West and Oliver Hardy.) Johnston, Shallenberger's right-hand-man, was Arrow's vice president and general manager from 1916 to 1924.

"There is no more popular man in the motion picture industry than Ray Johnston, who numbers his friends in the industry from coast to coast, and who often has been referred to as one of the best posted men on motion pictures," reported the trade paper Exhibitors Trade Review in 1924. Johnston's close connections with other movie men became the cornerstone of his business. He reluctantly left Shallenberger in 1924 at the urging of his associates: "My friends have offered me this opportunity of starting my own distributing company, and the conditions of the new plan are so ideal I could not afford to pass up the chance."

== Rayart ==
Johnston followed the successful Arrow business model and established Rayart Pictures (formed from his middle name). In 1929 Rayart entered the new field of sound pictures, releasing the first feature-length talking western Overland Bound, featuring silent stars Leo Maloney and Allene Ray. Its success prompted Ray Johnston to establish a subsidiary, Raytone Talking Pictures, Inc. Raytone scored an early coup by acquiring some of Walt Disney's now obsolete silent shorts (the Alice Comedies) and reissuing them with synchronized music and sound effects.

Johnston merged Rayart and Raytone into a new company, Continental Pictures, then Syndicate Pictures, and finally (in March 1931) Monogram Pictures. Johnston would continue to use the Syndicate brand name in later years for special-interest productions, like the crusading sex-education film No Greater Sin (1940).

== Monogram ==
By 1931 Johnston had built up a strong network of regional exchanges that handled Johnson's films. These local companies banded together with Johnston to form Monogram Pictures. With Johnston as head of production, Monogram turned out a steady supply of feature films. Fortunately for Johnston, this was before the days of double features, so a typical moviehouse program would show a single feature film, supplemented by short subjects. Thus Monogram's features could and did compete with major-studio productions on America's screens. (The Monogram brand name was not yet tainted with the "budget brand" status it would later endure.) Under Johnston, Monogram offered a variety of reasonably priced features for the Depression-era exhibitors, including adaptations of famous books and plays; gangster stories; jungle thrillers; topical comedies; romances; and westerns.

In 1935 film-laboratory executive Herbert J. Yates saw a chance to enter the production field by foreclosing on several of his accounts. He combined the resources of several small companies, including Ray Johnston's Monogram, and called the new studio Republic Pictures. Ray Johnston was originally one of Yates's partners but he, along with the other independent producers, found that Yates was making all the executive decisions himself. Johnston angrily withdrew from Republic in 1936 and called upon his old friends, the local franchise holders, to revive Monogram. Johnston then began preparing and filming new productions, and Monogram returned to the movie marketplace in 1937 with Johnston in command.

There had been a shift in film production during Johnston's absence. Double features were now sweeping the country, with the expensive "A" picture being the main item of interest, and the low-priced "B" picture being an added attraction on the same program. Ray Johnston saw that the major studios were making their own low-budget pictures for their own theater chains. Rather than competing on the same scale as the big companies and their theaters, Johnston concentrated on capturing the smaller market of independent neighborhood theaters, which could play Monogram features on the top or bottom of a double bill, or even as a single feature. This successful strategy established Monogram as a reliable budget brand, featuring such attractive screen personalities as Frankie Darro, Boris Karloff, Warren Hull, The East Side Kids, Buck Jones, Tim McCoy, Marjorie Reynolds, Keye Luke, Gale Storm, Mantan Moreland, Bela Lugosi, and Sidney Toler. From 1938, Monogram became synonymous with the movies' minor league, lacking the prestige of the major studios but still finding a market for its economically priced features.

== Senior executive ==
When Steve Broidy became head of production in 1945, Ray Johnston was named Monogram's chairman of the board. Johnston continued to serve the company in the same capacity when it became Allied Artists Pictures Corporation in 1953. In 1961, during a period of government scrutiny over transactions of securities, Johnston sold virtually all of his Allied Artists stock, holding on to a single share. He was Allied Artists' chairman of the board until March 1963, when he withdrew from the position after suffering a stroke. He remained on the studio's board of directors until his death three years later after a long illness, at the age of 74. He had been a company executive for almost 40 years.

== Selected filmography, produced by W. Ray Johnston ==
- Midnight Secrets (1924)
- For Another Woman (1924)
- Lightning Romance (1924)
- Geared to Go (1924)
- Trail Dust (1924)
- Easy Money (1925)
- The Knockout Kid (1925)
- Youth's Gamble (1925)
- Fighting Fate (1925)
- The Pride of the Force (1925)
- Winning a Woman (1925)
- Racing Romance (1926)
- The Wolf Hunters (1926)
- The Last Alarm (1926)
- The Dangerous Dude (1926)
- The Self Starter (1926)
- Stick to Your Story (1926)
- Speed Crazed (1926)
- Somebody's Mother (1926)
- The Winner (1926)
- Kentucky Handicap (1926)
- The Gallant Fool (1926)
- The Racing Fool (1927)
- The Range Riders (1927)
- The Show Girl (1927)
- The Silent Hero (1927)
- Modern Daughters (1927)
- Heroes in Blue (1927)
- Thunderbolt's Tracks (1927)
- On the Stroke of Twelve (1927)
- The Law and the Man (1928)
- Sisters of Eve (1928)
- The Phantom of the Turf (1928)
- Should a Girl Marry? (1928)
- Isle of Lost Men (1928)
- The City of Purple Dreams (1928)
- Shanghai Rose (1929)
- Handcuffed (1929)
- The Cowboy and the Outlaw (1929)
- Overland Bound (1929)
- All Faces West (1929)
- The Convict's Code (1930)
- Western Honor (1930)
- Beyond the Law (1930)
- The Phantom of the Desert (1930)
- Westward Bound (1930)
- Defenders of the Law (1931)
- Rider of the Plains (1931)
- A Son of the Plains (1931)
- Hidden Valley (1932)
- The Arm of the Law (1932)
- Ghost City (1932)
- Million Dollar Baby (1934)
- Women Must Dress (1935)

== Bibliography ==
- Michael R. Pitts. Poverty Row Studios, 1929–1940: An Illustrated History of 55 Independent Film Companies, with a Filmography for Each. McFarland & Company, 2005.
