= Oh Billy, Behave =

1926 film by Grover Jones

- Directed by: Grover Jones
- Starring: Billy West; Charlotte Merriam; Lionel Belmore
- Production company: Billy West Productions
- Distributed by: Rayart Pictures
- Release date: October 27, 1926
- Country: United States
- Languages: Silent; English intertitles

Oh Billy, Behave is a 1926 American silent comedy film directed by Grover Jones and starring Billy West, Charlotte Merriam and Lionel Belmore.

== Plot ==
Wealthy young Edwin Dunwell, who is perpetually anxious about his health, meets and falls in love with Diana Lovely after accidentally causing her car to plunge into a river. Unbeknownst to Edwin, his relatives are scheming to inherit his fortune and plan to harm him. When his doctor mistakenly predicts his death at 5:00 PM, Edwin's relatives try to manipulate him into signing a new will. However, upon discovering their deceit, Edwin refuses to sign and later learns that the diagnosis was inaccurate, caused by a bee in the doctor's stethoscope. Relieved and cured of his anxiety, Edwin decides to pursue Diana, who is about to depart on a train, and persuades her to marry him despite her father's objections.

== Cast ==
- Billy West as Edwin Dumwell
- Charlotte Merriam as Diana Lovely
- Lionel Belmore as Mr. Lovely
- Jimmy Aubrey as The Nurse

== Bibliography ==
- Munden, Kenneth White. The American Film Institute Catalog of Motion Pictures Produced in the United States, Part 1. University of California Press, 1997.
