= Rapid Fire Romance =

1926 film

- Directed by: Harry Joe Brown
- Written by: Harry Joe Brown
- Produced by: Harry Joe Brown
- Starring: Billy Sullivan; Marjorie Bonner; Harry Buckley
- Production company: Harry J. Brown Productions
- Distributed by: Rayart Pictures
- Release date: October 6, 1926
- Running time: 50 minutes
- Country: United States
- Languages: Silent; English intertitles

Rapid Fire Romance is a 1926 American silent action film directed by Harry Joe Brown and starring Billy Sullivan, Marjorie Bonner and Harry Buckley.

== Cast ==
- Billy Sullivan as Tommy Oliver
- Marjorie Bonner as Dixie Demnman
- Harry Buckley as Satin Fingers
- John Sinclair as 'Breezy' Denman

== Bibliography ==
- James Robert Parish & Michael R. Pitts. Film directors: a guide to their American films. Scarecrow Press, 1974.
