= Billy Sullivan (actor) =

American actor (1891–1946)

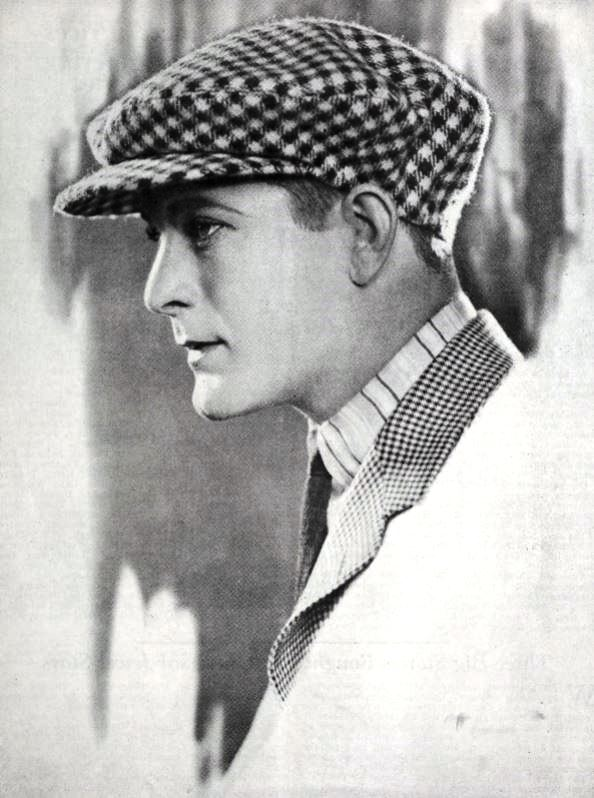
- Sullivan in or before 1924
- Born: William Arthur Sullivan; July 18, 1891; Worcester, Massachusetts, U.S.
- Died: May 23, 1946 (aged 54); Great Neck, New York, U.S.
- Occupation: Actor
- Years active: 1914–1936

William Arthur Sullivan (July 18, 1891 – May 23, 1946) was an American character actor of the silent and early sound film eras.

== Biography ==
Born in Worcester, Massachusetts, on July 18, 1891, Sullivan had his start in film shorts in the 1910s. His first film production was a short which was part of a 23-part serial entitled, The Million Dollar Mystery, in 1914. The 23 episodes were edited into a feature-length film of the same name in 1918. His first feature-length film was in the role of King Arthur in 1917's Over the Hill. During the early 1920s, he continued to work mainly in shorts, before moving into almost exclusively feature films in 1925. From 1924 through 1927, he starred in about 20 films for Rayart Pictures, such as The Slanderers (1924), Goat Getter (1925), The Winner (1926), and When Seconds Count (1927). During his career, he appeared in over 80 productions, including over 50 feature films. He died in Great Neck, New York, on May 23, 1946.

== Filmography ==
(Per AFI database)

- The Cigarette Girl (1917)
- Over the Hill (1917)
- What Becomes of the Children? (1918)
- The House of Mirth (1918)
- The Lightning Raider (1919 — serial)
- A Manhattan Knight (1920)
- The Courtship of Miles Standish (1923)
- The Leather Pushers (1922 — serial)
- The Slanderers (1924)
- The Fear Fighter (1925)
- Fighting Fate (1925)
- Goat Getter (1925)
- Ridin' Pretty (1925)
- The Speed Champion (1925)
- Broadway Billy (1926)
- Fighting Thorobreds (1926)
- The Gallant Fool (1926)
- The Heart of a Coward (1926)
- One Punch O'Day (1926)
- Rapid Fire Romance (1926)
- Speed Cop (1926)
- Speed Crazed (1926)
- Stick to Your Story (1926)
- The Windjammer (1926)
- The Winner (1926)
- The Patent Leather Pug (1926)
- Red Clay (1927)
- The Cancelled Debt (1927)
- Daring Deeds (1927)
- Smiling Billy (1927)
- Speedy Smith (1927)
- When Seconds Count (1927)
- Walking Back (1928)
- Sweepstakes (1931)
- Broadway Thru a Keyhole (1933)
- Name the Woman (1934)
- No More Women (1934)
- Among the Missing (1934)
- Murder by Television (1935)
- One More Spring (1935)
- It Happened in New York (1935)
- Public Hero No. 1 (1935)
- Transient Lady (1935)
- Mister Dynamite (1935)
- Lady Tubbs (1935)
- Big Brown Eyes (1936)
