= Fred Windemere =

American actor and director

- Born: Fritz Wintermeier; April 15, 1892; Muscatine, Iowa, U.S.
- Died: March 18, 1970 (aged 77); Newport Beach, California, U.S.
- Occupations: Actor, director
- Years active: 1912–1928
- Spouse: Belle Bennett (m. 1924; died 1932)

Fred Windemere (born Fritz Wintermeier, April 15, 1892 – March 18, 1970) was an American actor and film director of the silent era.

== Selected filmography ==
- Three in Exile (1925)
- With This Ring (1925)
- Romance Road (1925)
- Soiled (1925)
- The Verdict (1925)
- Morganson's Finish (1926)
- The Taxi Mystery (1926)
- Broadway After Midnight (1927)
- She's My Baby (1927)
- Devil Dogs (1928)
- Broadway Daddies (1928)

== Bibliography ==
- Munden, Kenneth White. The American Film Institute Catalog of Motion Pictures Produced in the United States, Part 1. University of California Press, 1997.
