= The Flaming Disc =

1920 film

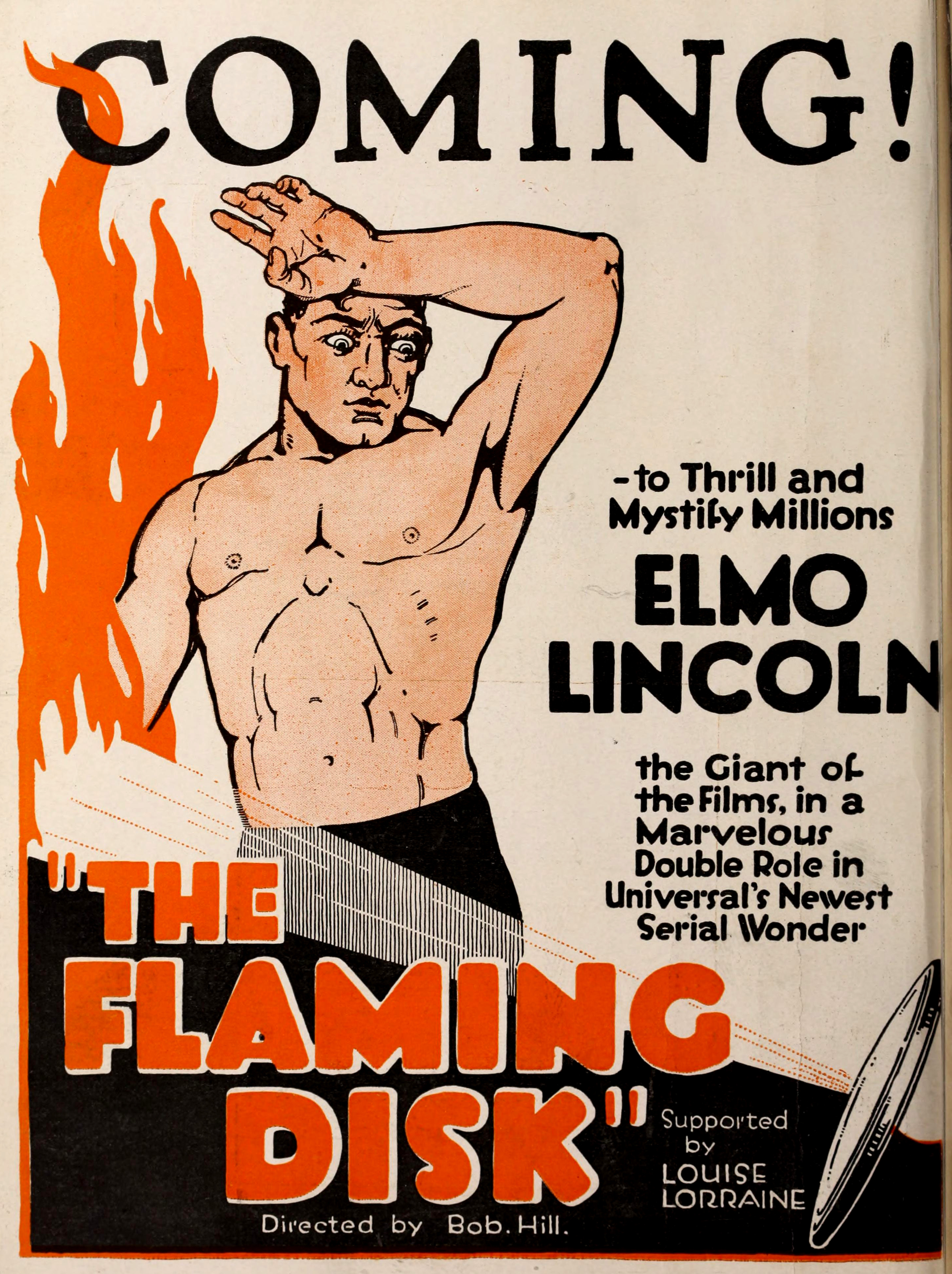
- Advertisement under the title The Flaming Disk
- Directed by: Robert F. Hill
- Written by: Arthur Henry Goodson
- Starring: Elmo Lincoln; Louise Lorraine
- Production company: Great Western Producing Company
- Distributed by: Universal Film Manufacturing Company
- Release date: November 21, 1920
- Running time: 18 episodes
- Country: United States
- Language: Silent (English intertitles)

The Flaming Disc is a 1920 American silent adventure film serial directed by Robert F. Hill. The first episode of the series, "Rails of Death", opened on November 21, 1920. A total of 18 film episodes were produced. The Flaming Disc is now presumed to be a lost film.

== Cast ==
- Elmo Lincoln as Elmo Gray / Jim Gray
- Louise Lorraine as Helen
- Monte Montague as Bat
- Lee Kohlmar as Prof. Wade
- George B. Williams as Stanley Barrows (credited as George Williams)
- Jenks Harris as Con
- Ray Watson as Rodney Stanton
- Fred Hamer as Briggs
- Fay Holderness
- Bob Reeves

== Episode titles ==
1. "Rails of Death"
2. "Span of Life"
3. "Perilous Leap"
4. "Fires of Hate"
5. "Vanishing Floor"
6. "Pool of Mystery"
7. "Circle of Fire"
8. "Through Walls of Steel"
9. "The Floating Mine"
10. "Spiked Death"
11. "The Dynamite Trail"
12. "The Tunnel of Flame"
13. "Caged In"
14. "The Purple Rays"
15. "Poisoned Waters"
16. "Running Wild"
17. "Rails of Destruction"
18. "End of the Trail"

== See also ==
- List of American films of 1920
- List of film serials
- List of film serials by studio
- List of lost films
