= The Taxi Mystery =

1926 film

- Directed by: Fred Windemere
- Written by: Tom J. Hopkins
- Starring: Edith Roberts; Robert Agnew; Virginia Pearson
- Production company: Banner Productions
- Distributed by: Henry Ginsberg Distributing Company; Wardour Films (UK)
- Release date: April 10, 1926
- Running time: 60 minutes
- Country: United States
- Language: Silent (English intertitles)

The Taxi Mystery is a 1926 American silent mystery film directed by Fred Windemere and starring Edith Roberts, Robert Agnew, and Virginia Pearson.

== Plot ==
As described in a film magazine review, millionaire Harry Canby saves a young woman from thugs by acting as the driver of her taxi. The woman disappears and he meets her again at a party, and finds out that she is Vera Norris, a musical comedy star. She refuses to recognize him. He again saves her when the manager and the husband of a rival star has her kidnaped so that his wife can play her part and so he can produce someone to get the young woman’s money in her stead. Vera plays her part, and comes into her inheritance, and finds her father Fred Norris.

== Cast ==
- Edith Roberts as Nancy Cornell / Vera Norris
- Robert Agnew as Harry Canby
- Virginia Pearson as Mrs. Blaine Jameson
- Phillips Smalley as Willoughby Thomson
- Bertram Grassby as Fred Norris

== Bibliography ==
- Munden, Kenneth White. The American Film Institute Catalog of Motion Pictures Produced in the United States, Part 1. University of California Press, 1997.
