= Galloping Hoofs =

1924 film

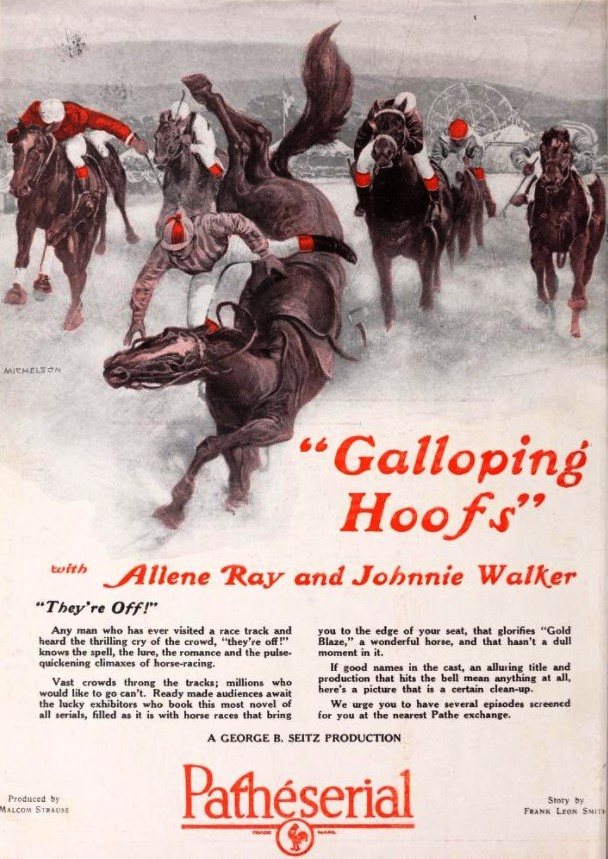
- Advertisement
- Directed by: George B. Seitz
- Written by: Frank Leon Smith
- Produced by: Malcolm Strauss
- Starring: Allene Ray; Johnnie Walker
- Production company: Malcolm Strauss Pictures
- Distributed by: Pathé Exchange
- Release date: December 21, 1924
- Running time: 10 episodes
- Country: United States
- Languages: Silent; English intertitles

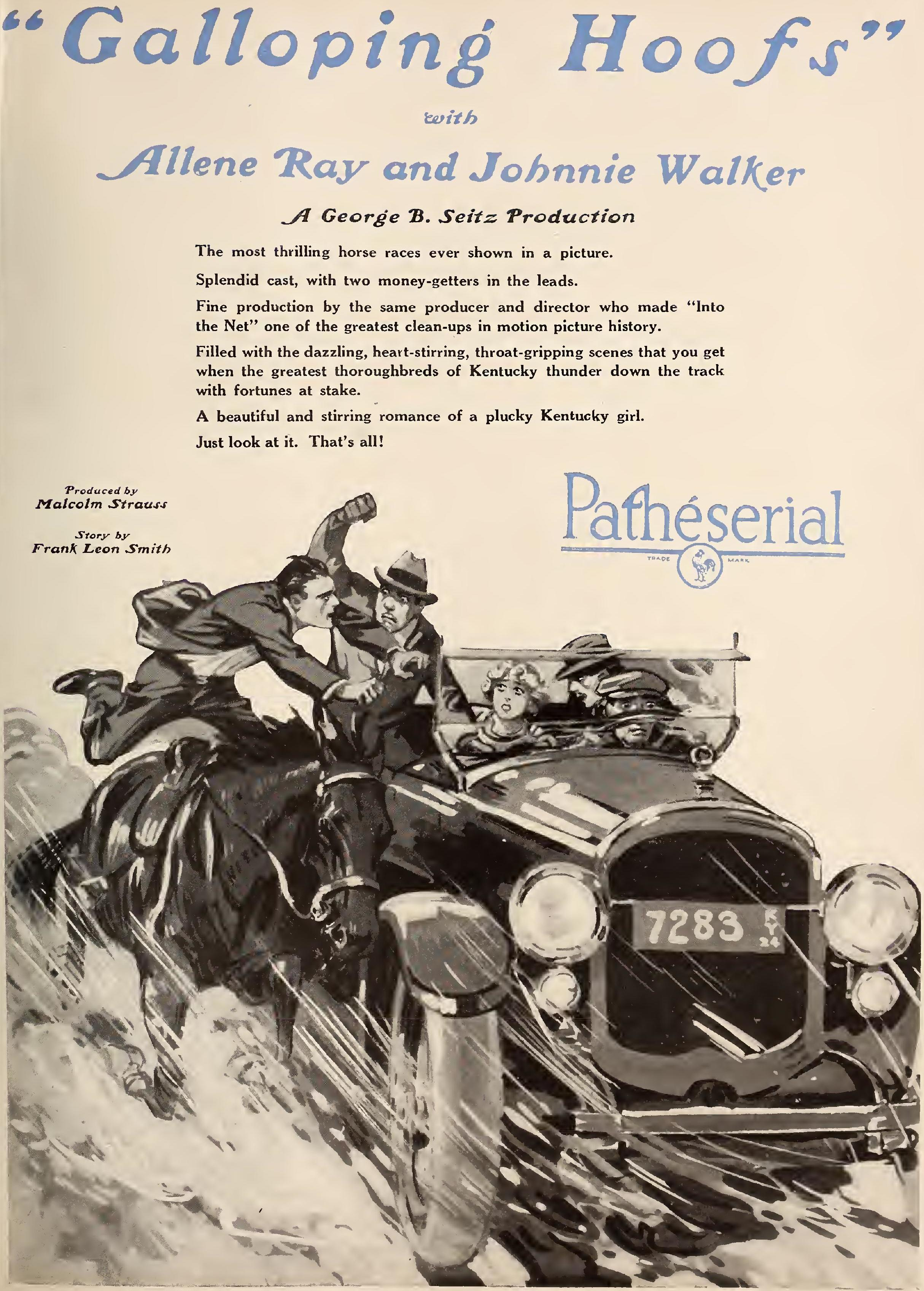
Galloping Hoofs ad in Exhibitor's Trade Review (Nov 1924-Feb 1925)

Galloping Hoofs is a 1924 American silent Western film serial directed by George B. Seitz and starring Allene Ray and Johnnie Walker. The film is now considered to be lost.

== Cast ==
- Allene Ray as Carole Page
- Johnnie Walker as David Kirby
- J. Barney Sherry as Richard Shaw
- Ernest Hilliard as Stephen Carrington
- Armand Cortes as Perry Gerard (credited as Armand Cortez)
- William Nally as Bob Monson
- George Nardelli as Emirof Smyrniston
- Albert Roccardi as Aby y'Souf

== Chapters ==
1. The Sealed Box
2. The Mountain Raid
3. Neck and Neck
4. The Duplicate Box
5. The Fateful Jump
6. Raging Waters
7. Out of the Depths
8. Ambushed
9. Tricked
10. Flying Colors

== See also ==
- List of film serials
- List of film serials by studio
- List of lost films
