= Soiled (film) =

1925 film

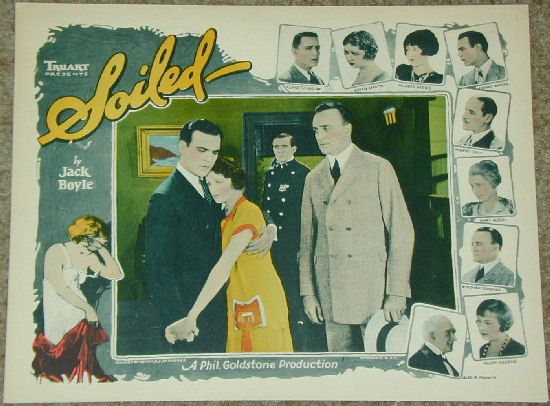
- Directed by: Fred Windemere
- Written by: Jack Natteford
- Produced by: Phil Goldstone
- Starring: Kenneth Harlan; Vivian Martin; Mildred Harris
- Cinematography: Edgar Lyons; Bert Baldridge
- Production company: Phil Goldstone Productions
- Distributed by: Truart Film Corporation
- Release date: November 8, 1925
- Running time: 56 minutes
- Country: United States
- Languages: Silent; English intertitles

Soiled is a 1925 American silent drama film directed by Fred Windemere and starring Kenneth Harlan, Vivian Martin and Mildred Harris. It was adapted for the screen by Jack Natteford based on a short story titled Debt of Dishonor by Jack Boyle, which originally appeared in Red Book.

== Cast ==
- Kenneth Harlan as Jimmie York
- Vivian Martin as Mary Brown
- Mildred Harris as Pet Darling
- Johnnie Walker as Wilbur Brown
- Mary Alden as Mrs. Brown
- Robert Cain as John Duane
- Wyndham Standing as James P. Munson
- Maude George as Bess Duane
- Alec B. Francis as Rollo Tetheridge

== Preservation ==
Soiled is currently presumed lost. In February of 2021, the film was cited by the National Film Preservation Board on their Lost U.S. Silent Feature Films list.

== Bibliography ==
- Munden, Kenneth White. The American Film Institute Catalog of Motion Pictures Produced in the United States, Part 1. University of California Press, 1997.
