= Robert Agnew =

American actor (1899–1983)

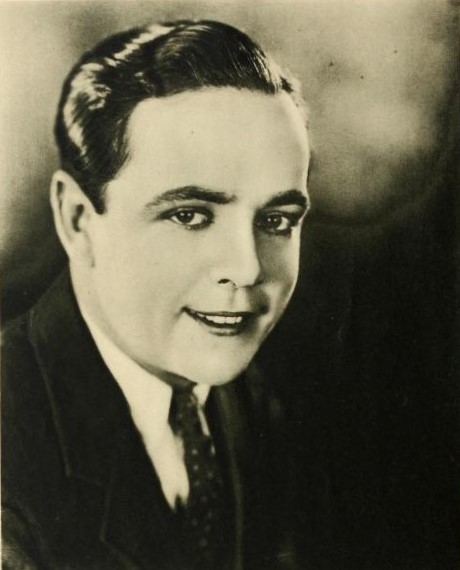
- Agnew in 1924
- Born: June 4, 1899; Dayton, Kentucky, U.S.
- Died: November 8, 1983 (aged 84); Palm Springs, California, U.S.
- Other name: Bobby Agnew
- Occupation: Actor
- Years active: 1920–1934

Robert Agnew (June 4, 1899 – November 8, 1983) was an American movie actor who worked mostly in the silent film era, making 65 films in both the silent and sound eras.

Agnew was born in Dayton, Kentucky. He died in 1983 in Palm Springs, California at the age of 84.

== Partial filmography ==
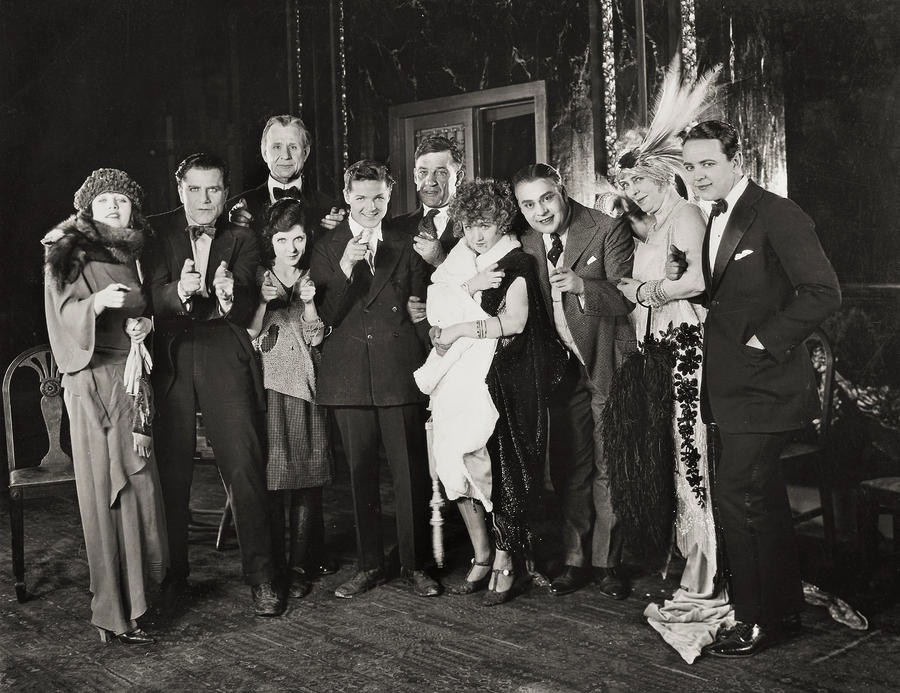
Agnew (far right) and cast members of Kick In (1922)

- The Sporting Duchess (1920) - Dick Hammond
- The Valley of Doubt (1920) - Tommy
- The Frisky Mrs. Johnson (1920) - Lal Birkenread
- The Sin That Was His (1920) - (uncredited)
- The Highest Law (1921) - Bobby Goodwin
- The Passion Flower (1921) - Faustino Eusebio
- The Sign on the Door (1921) - Alan Churchill
- The Wonderful Thing (1921) - Laurence Mannerby
- Without Fear (1922) - Walter Hamilton
- Who Are My Parents? (1922) - Bob Hale
- Clarence (1922) - Bobby Wheeler
- A Dangerous Adventure (1922, Serial) - Jimmy Morrison
- Kick In (1922) - Jerry Brandon
- A Dangerous Game (1922) - John Kelley
- Pawn Ticket 210 (1922) - Chick Saxe
- Three Who Paid (1923) - Hal Sinclair
- Trimmed in Scarlet (1923) - David Peirce
- Prodigal Daughters (1923) - Lester Hodge
- Only 38 (1923) - Bob Stanley
- Bluebeard's 8th Wife (1923) - Albert deMarceau
- The Marriage Maker (1923) - Cyril Overton
- The Spanish Dancer (1923) - Juan
- Woman-Proof (1923) - Dick Rockwood
- Love's Whirlpool (1924) - Larry
- Those Who Dance (1924) - Matt Carney
- Broken Barriers (1924) - Bobbie Durland
- Wine of Youth (1924) - Bobby Hollister
- Wine (1924) - Harry Van Alstyne
- Troubles of a Bride (1924) - Robert Wallace
- Gold Heels (1924) - Boots
- The Denial (1925) - Young Officer
- Private Affairs (1925) - Fred Henley
- The Man Without a Conscience (1925) - James Warren
- Lost: A Wife (1925) - Dick
- Tessie (1925) - Roddy Wells
- Steppin' Out (1925) - Henry Brodman Jr.
- The Great Love (1925) - Dr. Lawrence Tibbits
- Wild Oats Lane (1926) - The Boy
- The Taxi Mystery (1926) - Harry Canby
- Racing Blood (1926) - James Fleminng
- Unknown Treasures (1926) - Bob Ramsey
- Dancing Days (1926) - Gerald Hedman
- Wandering Girls (1927) - Jerry Arnold
- Quarantined Rivals (1927) - Bruce Farney
- Fourth Commandment (1927) - Sonny
- Down the Stretch (1927) - Marty Kruger
- Snowbound (1927) - Peter Foley
- The Heart of Salome (1927) - Redfern
- She's My Baby (1927) - Bobby Horton
- The Prince of Headwaiters (1927) - Elliott Cable
- Slightly Used (1927) - Donald Woodward
- The College Hero (1927) - Bob Cantfield
- The Heart of Broadway (1928) - Billy Winters
- The Midnight Taxi (1928) - Jack Madison
- The Woman Racket (1930) - Rags
- French Kisses (1930, Short)
- Extravagance (1930) - Billy
- The Naughty Flirt (1931) - Wilbur Fairchild
- Golddiggers of 1933 (1933) - Dance Director (uncredited)
- Little Man, What Now? (1934) - Minor Role (uncredited) (final film role)
