= The Lost Limited =

1927 film directed by J.P. McGowan

- Directed by: J.P. McGowan
- Written by: Henry Roberts Symonds
- Produced by: Harry Joe Brown
- Starring: Reed Howes; Ruth Dwyer; Henry A. Barrows
- Cinematography: Walter L. Griffin
- Production company: Harry J. Brown Productions
- Distributed by: Rayart Pictures
- Release date: April 1927
- Country: United States
- Languages: Silent; English intertitles

The Lost Limited is a 1927 American silent action film directed by J.P. McGowan and starring Reed Howes, Ruth Dwyer and Henry A. Barrows. Location shooting for the film took place in South Dakota, Brooklyn, New York, and Los Angeles, California. It is considered a lost film.

== Cast ==
- Reed Howes as Leonard Hathaway
- Ruth Dwyer as Nora Murphy
- Henry A. Barrows as Silas Brownley
- Billy Franey as Rambling Red
- J.P. McGowan as Thomas Webber
- George B. French
- Dot Farley

== Preservation ==
With no holdings located in archives, The Lost Limited is considered a lost film. In February of 2021, the film was cited by the National Film Preservation Board on their Lost U.S. Silent Feature Films list.

== Bibliography ==
- Munden, Kenneth White. The American Film Institute Catalog of Motion Pictures Produced in the United States, Part 1. University of California Press, 1997.
