= Crack o' Dawn =

1925 film directed by Albert S. Rogell

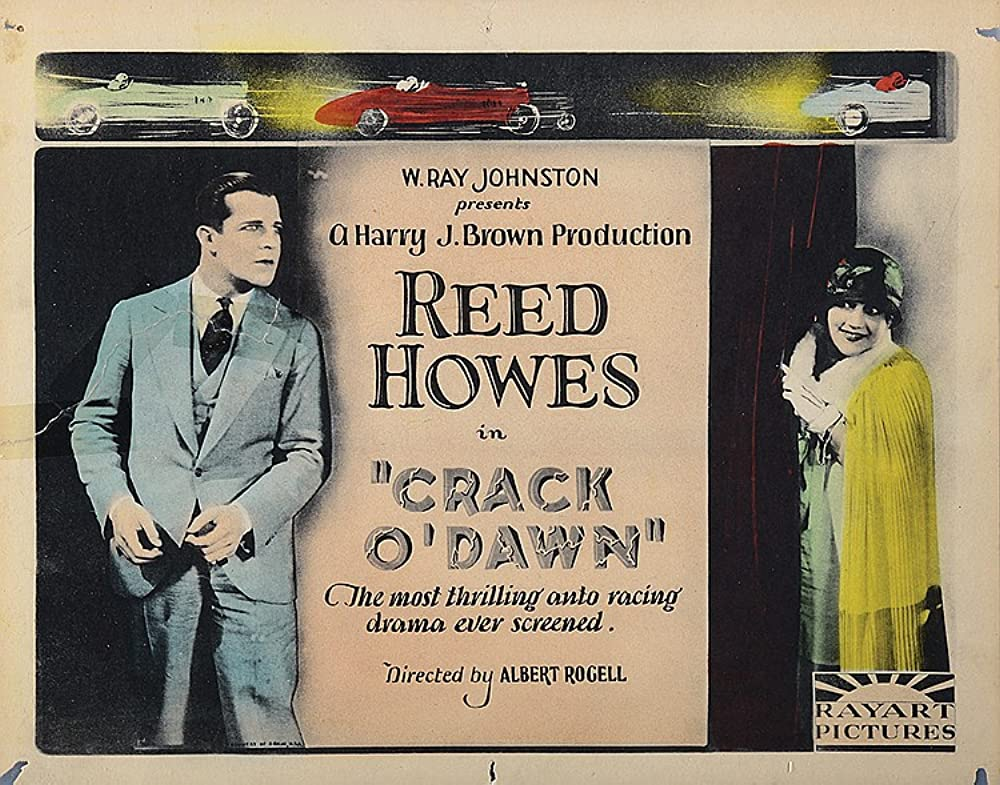
- Directed by: Albert S. Rogell
- Written by: John Grey(as John Wesley Grey)
- Based on: a story by Henry Roberts Symonds
- Produced by: Harry Joe Brown; W. Ray Johnston
- Starring: Reed Howes; Ruth Dwyer
- Cinematography: Lee Garmes
- Distributed by: Rayart Pictures
- Release date: August 21, 1925
- Running time: 63 minutes
- Country: United States
- Language: Silent..English

Crack o' Dawn is an extant 1925 silent action adventure film directed by Albert S. Rogell and starring Reed Howes.

== Cast ==
- Reed Howes – Earle Thorpe Jr.
- J. P. McGowan – Earle Thorpe Sr.
- Ruth Dwyer – Earl Thompson
- Henry A. Barrows – Henry Thompson
- Eddie Barry – Toby Timkins
- Tom O'Brien – Stanley Steele
- Ethan Laidlaw – Red Riley

== Preservation status ==
- A print is held by George Eastman House Motion Picture Collection.
