= The Verdict (1925 film) =

1925 silent film

- Directed by: Fred Windemere
- Written by: Jack Natteford
- Produced by: Phil Goldstone
- Starring: Lou Tellegen; Louise Lorraine; Gertrude Astor
- Cinematography: Roland Price
- Production company: Phil Goldstone Productions
- Distributed by: Truart Film Corporation; Woolf & Freedman Film Service (UK)
- Release date: April 16, 1925
- Running time: 60 minutes
- Country: United States
- Language: Silent (English intertitles)

The Verdict is a 1925 American silent mystery film directed by Fred Windemere and starring Lou Tellegen, Louise Lorraine, and Gertrude Astor. A print of The Verdict exists in the UCLA Film & Television Archive.

== Plot ==
As described in a film magazine review, Jimmy is tried and convicted of murder based upon circumstantial evidence after the shooting of Ronsard, an admirer of Jimmy's sweetheart Carol. After a second trial, where Jimmy is proved innocent, the Butler confesses having shot the man in self-defense on the night the young woman was dining quietly with Ronsard. Bookkeeper Jimmy's accounts had come up short, and Ronsard had promised to help if she would dine there.

== Cast ==
- Lou Tellegen as Victor Ronsard
- Louise Lorraine as Carol Kingsley
- William Collier Jr. as Jimmy Mason
- Gertrude Astor as Mrs. Ronsard
- Josef Swickard as Pierre Ronsard
- Paul Weigel as Butler
- Taylor Holmes as Valet
- Stanton Heck as Detective
- Elliott Dexter as Lawyer
- George Fawcett as Judge
- Gaston Glass as District Attorney
- Walter Long as Convict

== Bibliography ==
- Munden, Kenneth White. The American Film Institute Catalog of Motion Pictures Produced in the United States, Part 1. University of California Press, 1997.
