= The Silent Guardian =

1925 film

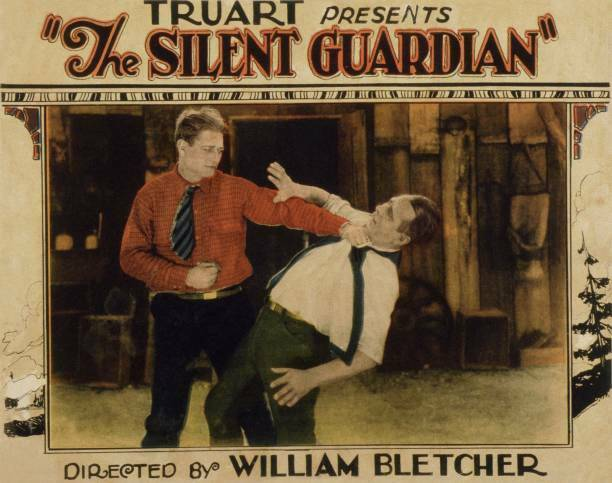
- Lobby card
- Directed by: Billy Bletcher
- Written by: Ewart Adamson
- Produced by: Phil Goldstone
- Starring: Louise Lorraine; Harry Tenbrook; Art Acord
- Cinematography: Conrad Wells
- Production company: Phil Goldstone Productions
- Distributed by: Truart Film Corporation
- Release date: November 21, 1925
- Running time: 50 minutes
- Country: United States
- Language: Silent (English intertitles)

The Silent Guardian is a 1925 American silent Western film directed by Billy Bletcher and starring Louise Lorraine, Harry Tenbrook, and Art Acord.

The film was extant as of 2000; a nitrate print being screened at that time.

== Cast ==
- Louise Lorraine as Jessie Stevens
- Harry Tenbrook as Job Stevens
- L.J. O'Connor as Red Collins
- Art Acord as Jim Sullivan
- Grace Woods as Sheriff's Wife
- Rex the Dog as Rex, Red's Dog
- Black Beauty as Black Beauty, a Horse

== Bibliography ==
- Donald W. McCaffrey & Christopher P. Jacobs. Guide to the Silent Years of American Cinema. Greenwood Publishing, 1999. ISBN 0-313-30345-2
