= Morganson's Finish =

1926 film

- Directed by: Fred Windemere
- Written by: Jack London
- Starring: Anita Stewart; Johnnie Walker; Mahlon Hamilton
- Production company: Tiffany Pictures
- Distributed by: Tiffany Pictures
- Release date: May 5, 1926
- Country: United States
- Languages: Silent; English intertitles

Morganson's Finish is a 1926 American silent drama film directed by Fred Windemere and starring Anita Stewart, Johnnie Walker and Mahlon Hamilton.

== Cast ==
- Anita Stewart as Barbara Wesley
- Johnnie Walker as Dick Gilbert
- Mahlon Hamilton as Dan Morganson
- Victor Potel as Ole Jensen
- Crauford Kent as G.T. Williams
- Rose Tapley as Doctor's Wife

== Bibliography ==
- Munden, Kenneth White. The American Film Institute Catalog of Motion Pictures Produced in the United States, Part 1. University of California Press, 1997.
