= In the Headlines =

1929 film

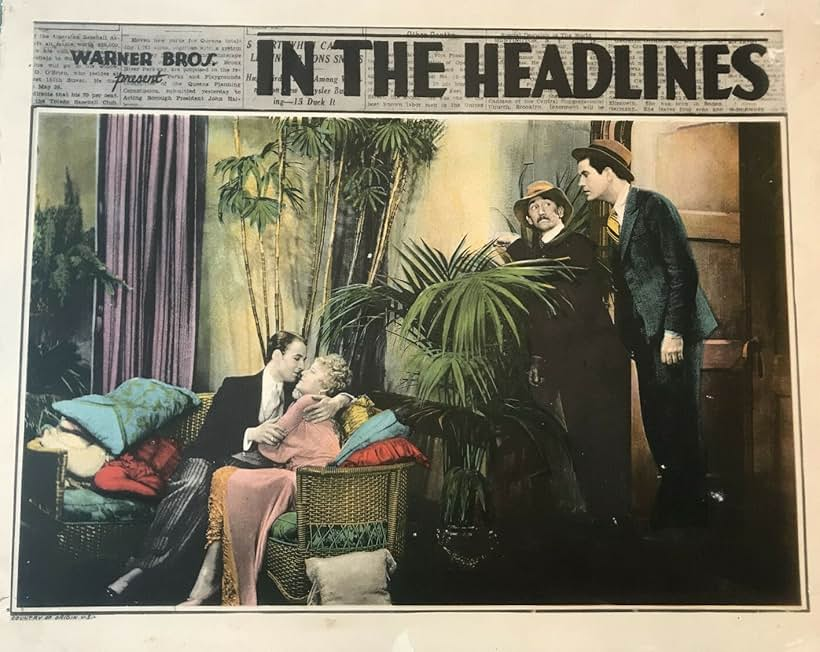
- Lobby card
- Directed by: John G. Adolfi
- Written by: James A Starr (story); Joseph Jackson (writer)
- Produced by: Warner Brothers
- Starring: Grant Withers; Marian Nixon
- Music by: Cecil Copping
- Distributed by: Warner Bros. Pictures
- Release date: August 31, 1929
- Running time: 8 reels
- Country: USA
- Language: English

In the Headlines is a 1929 American pre-Code crime drama film directed by John G. Adolfi and starring Grant Withers and Marian Nixon. It was produced and distributed by Warner Bros. Pictures.

== Plot ==
Nosey Norton, a brash and self-assured star reporter for The News, and grizzled Detective Robinson are the first to arrive at the scene of a sensational double murder: two prominent downtown brokers, Randall and Kernell, have been found dead in their office. The only other person present is their jittery office manager, Parker.

Parker claims he overheard the two men arguing, followed by two gunshots. When he entered the room, both were already dead.

Sensing front-page gold, Nosey phones his editor, Eddy, and—ignoring Robinson's advice to wait for official details—dictates a spicy exclusive: the men died in a duel over a mysterious blonde.

Soon, rival reporters Fancy Somerset and Levine arrive. Wanting to keep his scoop intact, Nosey slyly tells them the deaths were due to heart failure. They take the bait and wire the bogus story to their newspapers. Nosey and Robinson share a knowing look.

Moments later, a stunning blonde woman, Blondie, appears via a side door. Robinson suspects she's involved, but she claims she came seeking a typing job and passes an impromptu typewriting test, buying herself some time.

Nosey, along with Flashlight, the paper's wisecracking photographer, and Johnny, the eager office boy, pulls further ahead of the competition by charming photos of the dead men from their grieving wives, including Mrs. Kernell.

Back at The News, Eddy receives instructions to bring on a new reporter: Anna Lou Anderson, a fresh-faced journalism school graduate. Eddy groans, but assigns her to Nosey at the courthouse press room.

When Anna Lou arrives, Nosey is furious at being saddled with a rookie—until he lays eyes on her. Instantly smitten, he decides to show her the ropes. They begin tailing leads together, but Nosey, distracted by his feelings, neglects the murder story. The two grow inseparable, spending more time at theaters and the beach than at the office.

One evening, as they cook dinner in Anna Lou's apartment, they hear newsboys shouting headlines. Fancy Somerset has scooped them with an exposé: there was a blonde in the case—just as Nosey first guessed. Realizing they've dropped the ball, the pair scrambles back into action.

Nosey bluffs Parker on the phone, hoping to shake something loose. During the call, he's interrupted by an unexpected voice: his own half-sister. She's coming to see him—immediately.

Panicked, Nosey sends Anna Lou out to shadow Mrs. Kernell. When his sister arrives, he's stunned to see that it's Blondie—now going by the name Alice Adair. She offers Nosey $10,000 to drop the case and sail for Paris with Anna Lou. He refuses.

Later, Anna Lou returns and sees a gold-tipped cigarette and lipstick-stained glass. She accuses Nosey of betrayal. Nosey tries to explain that Blondie is his half-sister and deeply involved in the case, but Anna Lou doesn't believe him and storms out.

The next morning, Nosey, haggard and heartbroken, returns to the office to resign—only to discover that Anna Lou has gone missing while following up on the story. Nosey knows exactly who's behind it: Blondie and Parker.

Tracking a phone call, he locates their hideout. At the door, Parker pulls a gun, with Blondie behind him. In the struggle, they escape, and Nosey races through the house to find Anna Lou bound and about to drink a drugged concoction. He knocks it from her hand just in time.

She reveals she overheard Parker and Blondie's confession: Kernell killed Randall, and Parker murdered Kernell. Blondie helped cover it up.

They rush back to the office and deliver the exclusive to a jubilant Eddy. He rewards them with three weeks of paid vacation—perfect for a honeymoon.

Meanwhile, Parker and Blondie are caught trying to flee by train. Justice is served, and a new star reporting duo is born.

== Cast ==
- Grant Withers as Nosey Norton
- Marion Nixon as Anna Lou Anderson
- Clyde Cook as Flashlight
- Edmund Breese as Eddy
- Pauline Garon as Blondie
- Frank Campeau as Detective Robinson
- Vivian Oakland as Mrs. Kernell
- Hallam Cooley as Fancy Somerset
- Robert Ober as Parker
- Ben Hall as Cub Reporter
- Spec O'Donnell as Johnny
- Jack Wise as Levine

== Music ==
The film featured a theme song entitled "Love Will Find A Way" with lyrics by Al Dubin and music by Joseph A. Burke.

== Preservation status ==
This film is considered to be lost.

== See also ==
- List of early sound feature films (1926–1929)
