= Three in Exile =

1925 film

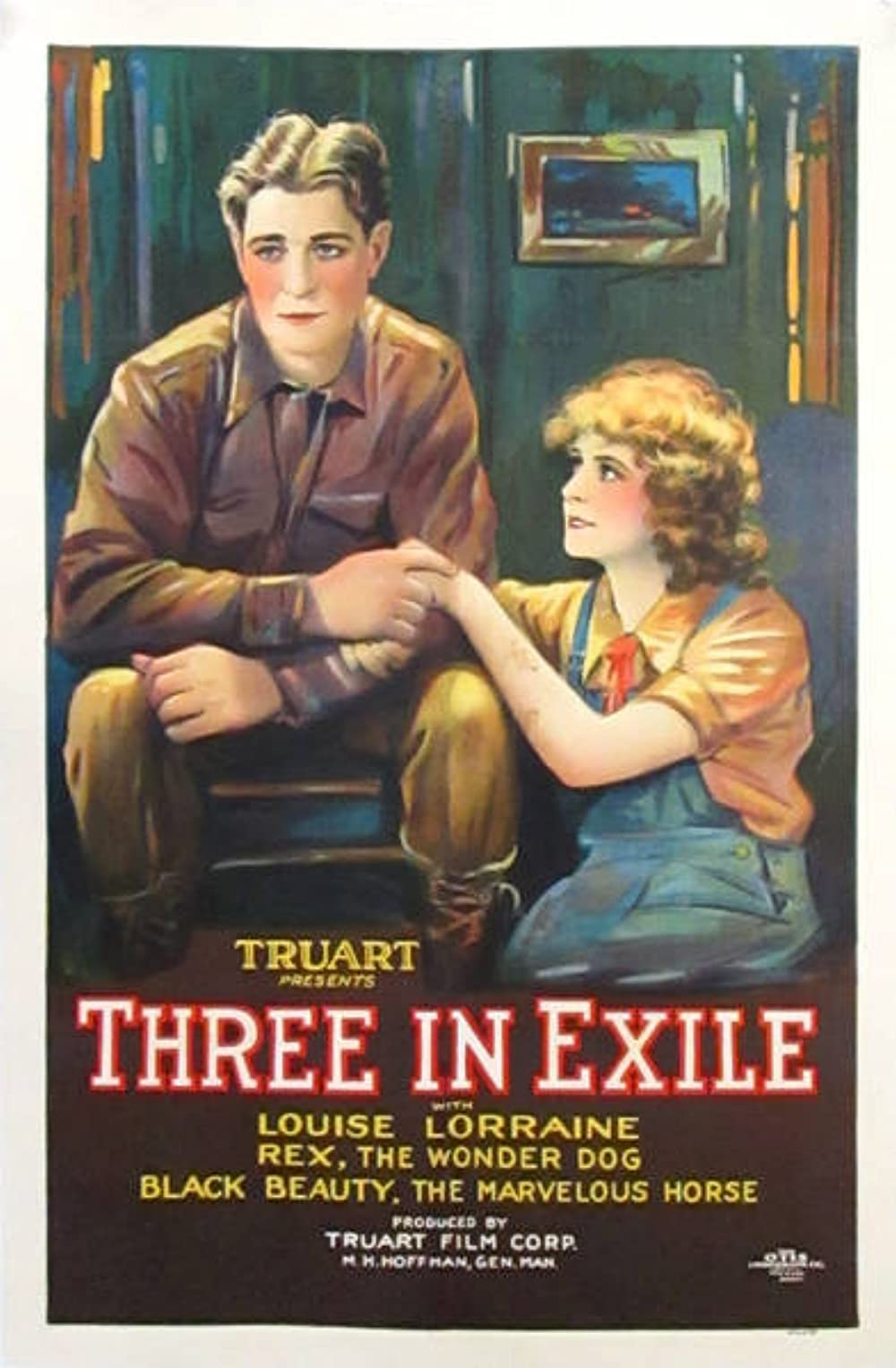
- Film poster
- Directed by: Fred Windemere
- Written by: George Hively
- Produced by: M.H. Hoffman; Phil Goldstone
- Starring: Louise Lorraine; Art Acord; Tom London
- Cinematography: Conrad Wells
- Production company: Phil Goldstone Productions
- Distributed by: Truart Film Corporation
- Release date: August 21, 1925
- Running time: 50 minutes
- Country: United States
- Language: Silent (English intertitles)

Three in Exile is a lost 1925 American silent Western film directed by Fred Windemere and starring Louise Lorraine, Art Acord, and Tom London.

== Plot ==
As described in a film magazine review, a dog that is chased by a mob, a man named Art who runs from an enemy he believes he has killed, and a horse that escapes his brutal owners meet on the desert edge. They search for water and in the search meet Lorraine, a young woman whose enemies are attempting to steal her mine. Together the man and woman and their four-footed animal friends defeat the would-be thieves. The couple are then married.

== Cast ==
- Louise Lorraine as Lorraine Estes
- Art Acord as Art Flanders
- Tom London as Jed Hawkings
- Rex the Dog as Rex, Art's Dog
- Black Beauty as Black Beauty, a Horse

== Preservation ==
With no holdings located in archives, Three in Exile is considered a lost film.

== Bibliography ==
- Munden, Kenneth White. The American Film Institute Catalog of Motion Pictures Produced in the United States, Part 1. University of California Press, 1997.
