= Bound in Morocco =

1918 film by Allan Dwan

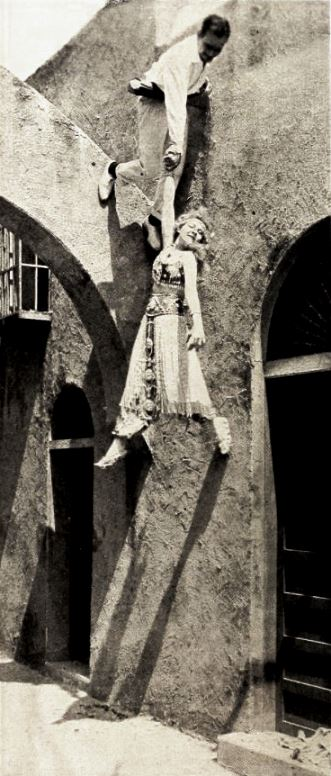
- Still with Douglas Fairbanks and Pauline Curley
- Directed by: Allan Dwan
- Written by: Allan Dwan (scenario)
- Screenplay by: Elton Thomas
- Story by: Elton Thomas
- Produced by: Douglas Fairbanks; Adolph Zukor; Jesse L. Lasky
- Starring: Douglas Fairbanks
- Cinematography: Hugh McClung
- Production company: Fairbanks Pictures Corp.
- Distributed by: Famous Players–Lasky/Artcraft Pictures; Gaumont (France)
- Release dates: June 28, 1918 (U.S.); May 21, 1920 (France)
- Running time: 64 minutes
- Country: United States
- Language: Silent (English intertitles)

Bound in Morocco is a 1918 American silent action romantic comedy film starring Douglas Fairbanks. Fairbanks produced and wrote the film's story and screenplay (under the pseudonym Elton Thomas), and Allan Dwan directed. The film was produced by Douglas Fairbanks Pictures Corporation and distributed by Famous Players–Lasky/Artcraft Pictures.

== Plot ==
As described in a film magazine, George Travelwell, an American youth motoring in Morocco, discovers that the governor of El Harib has seized a young American woman for his harem. Disguised as an inmate of the harem, George nearly wrecks the place while he rescues her. One thrilling incident follows upon the heels of another in their attempts to get away, and it ends with him setting one tribe against another, leaving them free to peacefully ride away.

== Cast ==
- Douglas Fairbanks as George Travelwell
- Pauline Curley as Ysail
- Edythe Chapman as Ysail's mother
- Tully Marshall as Ali Pah Shush
- Frank Campeau as Basha El Harib, Governor of Harib
- Jay Dwiggins as Kaid Mahedi el Menebhi, Lord High Ambassador to Morocco
- Fred Burns as Bandit Chief
- Albert MacQuarrie
- Marjorie Daw (uncredited)
- John George as Hunchback (uncredited)
- Emma-Lindsay Squier as Townswoman (uncredited)

== Preservation ==
With no prints of Bound in Morocco located in any film archives, it is considered to be a lost film.

== See also ==
- List of lost films
