= Victoria Moore =

American screenwriter

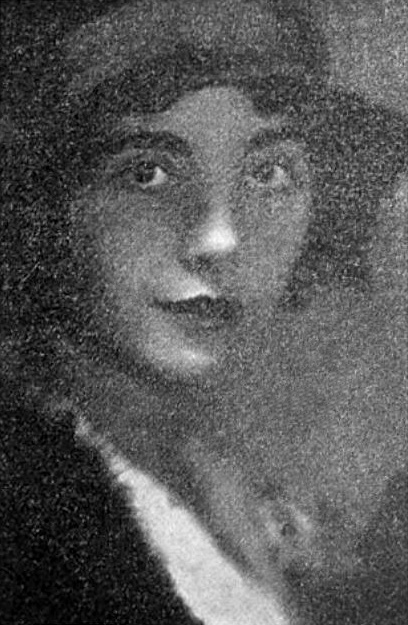
- Occupation: Screenwriter
- Years active: 1925–1928

Victoria Moore was an American screenwriter active in Hollywood during the 1920s.

== Selected filmography ==
- A Little Girl in a Big City (1925)
- The Part Time Wife (1925)
- The Police Patrol (1925)
- His Rise to Fame (1927)
- Broadway Daddies (1928)
- Fashion Madness (1928)
