= She's My Baby (film) =

1927 film

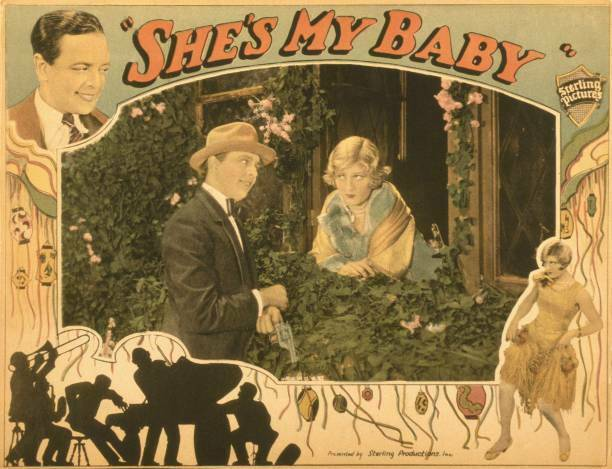
- Directed by: Fred Windemere
- Written by: Frances Guihan
- Starring: Robert Agnew; Kathleen Myers; Earle Williams
- Cinematography: Herbert Kirkpatrick
- Production company: Sterling Pictures
- Distributed by: Sterling Pictures
- Release date: May 10, 1927
- Running time: 60 minutes
- Country: United States
- Languages: Silent; English intertitles

She's My Baby is a 1927 American silent comedy film directed by Fred Windemere and starring Robert Agnew, Kathleen Myers and Earle Williams.

== Synopsis ==
After twenty years of marriage, Mary Wilbur and her husband John keep up a pretense of happiness only for the sake of their daughter Bernice. In fact both embark on very unwise flirtations with potential lovers.

== Cast ==
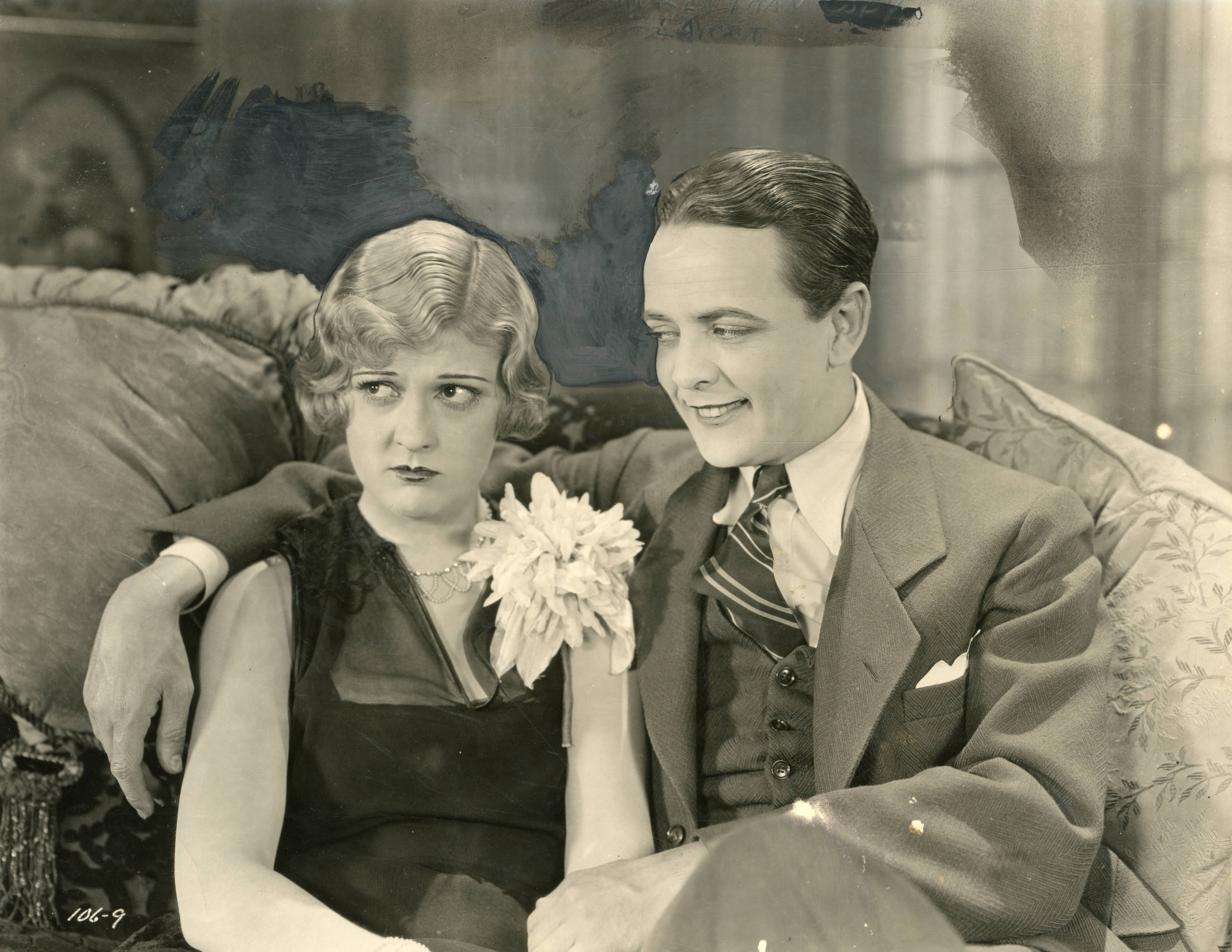
Kathleen Myers and Robert Agnew in She's My Baby

- Robert Agnew as Bobby Horton
- Kathleen Myers as Bernice Wilbur
- Earle Williams as John Wilbur
- Grace Carlyle as Mary Wilbur
- Mildred Harris as Claire Daltour
- Alphonse Martell as Alphonze Dabreau
- Max Asher as Henry Conrad
- William Irving as Chuck Callahan

== Bibliography ==
- Connelly, Robert B. The Silents: Silent Feature Films, 1910-36, Volume 40, Issue 2. December Press, 1998.
- Munden, Kenneth White. The American Film Institute Catalog of Motion Pictures Produced in the United States, Part 1. University of California Press, 1997.
