= Steppin' Out (1925 film) =

1925 film directed by Frank R. Strayer

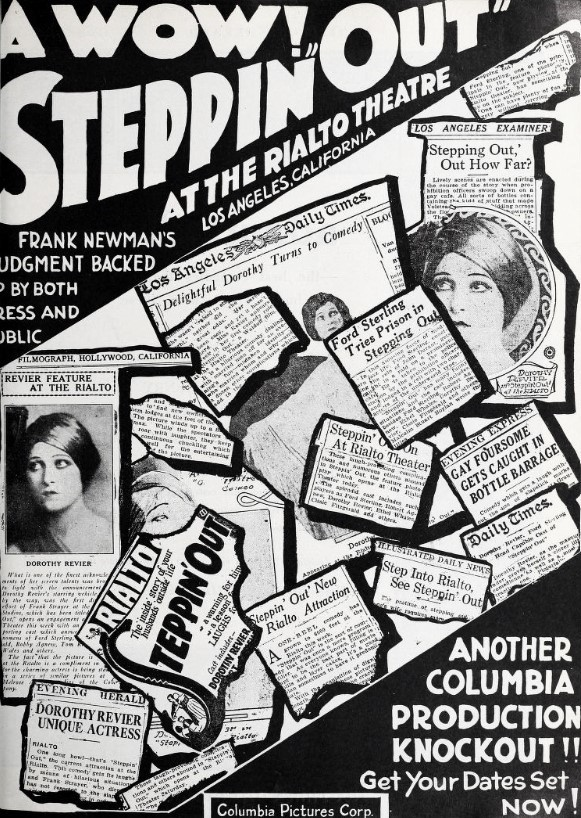
- Trade advertisement
- Directed by: Frank R. Strayer
- Written by: Bernard Vorhaus
- Produced by: Harry Cohn
- Starring: Dorothy Revier; Ford Sterling; Robert Agnew
- Cinematography: Dewey Wrigley
- Production company: Columbia Pictures
- Distributed by: Columbia Pictures
- Release date: October 15, 1925 (US)
- Running time: 6 reels
- Country: United States
- Language: Silent (English intertitles)

Steppin' Out is a 1925 American silent comedy film directed by Frank R. Strayer from a screenplay by Bernard Vorhaus. The film stars Dorothy Revier, Ford Sterling, and Robert Agnew, and was released by Columbia Pictures on October 15, 1925.

== Cast list ==
- Dorothy Revier as Daisy Moran
- Ford Sterling as John Durant
- Robert Agnew as Henry Brodman Jr.
- Cissy Fitzgerald as Mrs. John Durant
- Ethel Wales as Mrs. Henry Brodman
- Tom Ricketts as Henry Brodman
- Harry Lorraine as Sergeant

== Preservation and status ==
An incomplete copy of the film, with reels 3 and 5 missing, is held at the Library of Congress.
