= The Midnight Adventure =

1928 film

- Directed by: Duke Worne
- Written by: Arthur Hoerl
- Produced by: Duke Worne
- Starring: Cullen Landis; Edna Murphy; Ernest Hilliard
- Cinematography: Malcolm Sweeney
- Edited by: Walter L. Griffin
- Production company: Duke Worne Productions
- Distributed by: Rayart Pictures
- Release date: May 1928
- Running time: 50 minutes
- Country: United States
- Languages: Silent; English intertitles

The Midnight Adventure is a 1928 American silent mystery film directed by Duke Worne and starring Cullen Landis, Edna Murphy and Ernest Hilliard.

== Synopsis ==
Guests a country mansion all fall under suspicion when a murder is committed.

== Cast ==
- Cullen Landis as Fred Nicholson
- Edna Murphy as Jeanne Wentworth
- Ernest Hilliard as Randolph Sargent
- Jack Richardson as Anthony Munroe
- Allan Sears as Bart Gainsborough
- Virginia Kirtley as Alicia Gainsborough
- Maude Truax as Patricia Royles
- Ben Hall as Bertram Wellington Coy
- Betty Caldwell as Josephine Franklin
- Tom O'Grady as Mr. Caldwell
- Fred Kelsey as Cassidy
- Edward Cecil as Wilkins
- Amber Norman as Mrs. Caldwell

== Bibliography ==
- John T. Weaver. Twenty Years of Silents, 1908-1928. Scarecrow Press, 1971.
