= The Heart of Salome =

1927 film by Victor Schertzinger

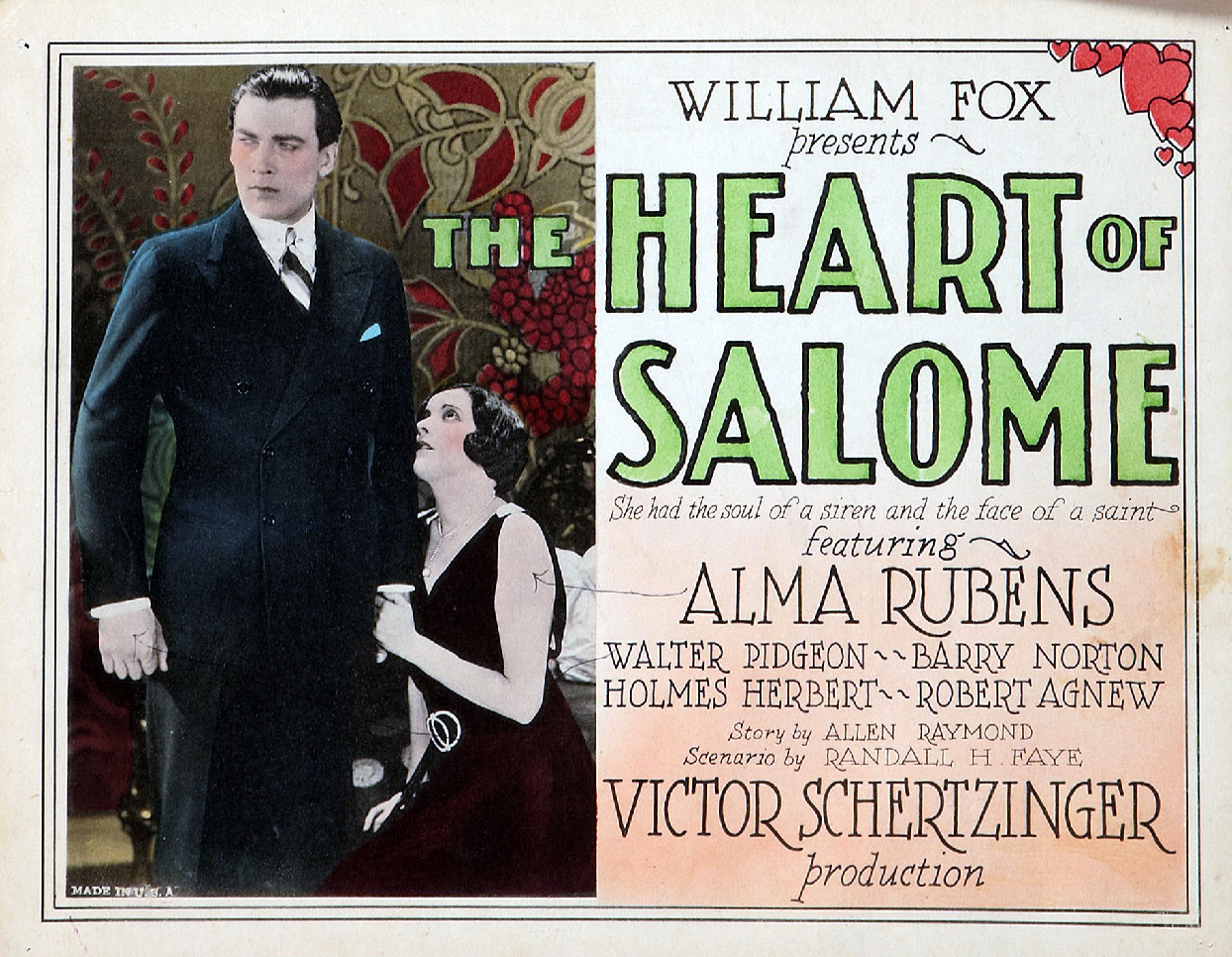
- Lobby card
- Directed by: Victor Schertzinger
- Screenplay by: Randall Faye
- Based on: The Heart of Salome by Allen Raymond
- Starring: Alma Rubens; Walter Pidgeon; Holmes Herbert; Robert Agnew; Erin La Bissoniere; Walter Dugan
- Cinematography: Glen MacWilliams
- Edited by: Margaret Clancey
- Production company: Fox Film Corporation
- Distributed by: Fox Film Corporation
- Release date: May 8, 1927
- Running time: 63 minutes
- Country: United States
- Language: English

The Heart of Salome is a lost 1927 American romance film directed by Victor Schertzinger and written by Randall Faye. It is based on the 1925 novel The Heart of Salome by Allen Raymond. The film stars Alma Rubens, Walter Pidgeon, Holmes Herbert, Robert Agnew, Erin La Bissoniere and Walter Dugan. The film was released on May 8, 1927, by Fox Film Corporation.

== Cast ==
- Alma Rubens as Helene
- Walter Pidgeon as Monte Carroll
- Holmes Herbert as Sir Humphrey
- Robert Agnew as Redfern
- Erin La Bissoniere as Helen's Maid
- Walter Dugan as Chauffeur
- Barry Norton as Henri Bezanne
- Virginia Madison as Madame Bezanne

== Preservation ==
The film is now lost.
