= A Final Reckoning =

1928 film directed by Ray Taylor

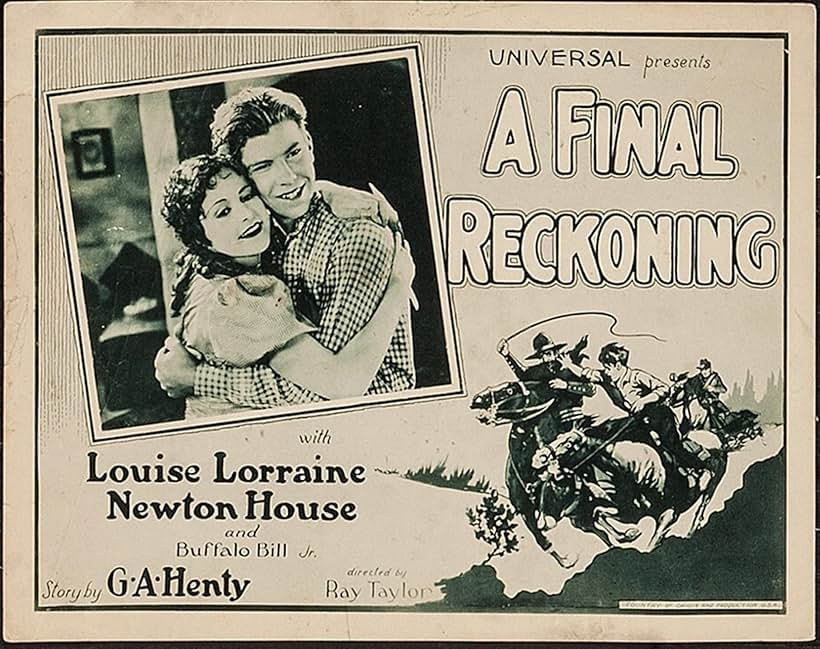
- Directed by: Ray Taylor
- Written by: Basil Dickey; George Morgan
- Starring: Newton House; Louise Lorraine
- Cinematography: Frank Redman
- Distributed by: Universal Pictures
- Release date: April 15, 1928
- Country: United States
- Languages: Silent; English intertitles

A Final Reckoning is a 1928 American silent Western film serial directed by Ray Taylor, set in colonial Australia. The film is considered to be lost. It is based on an 1887 novel by G. A. Henty.

== Cast ==
- Newton House as Ruben Whitney
- Louise Lorraine as Miss Whitney, Ruben's Sister
- Jay Wilsey as Captain Wilson (as Buffalo Bill Jr.)
- Edmund Cobb as Black Jack
- Frank Clark as Jim Whitney

== See also ==
- List of American films of 1928
- List of film serials
- List of film serials by studio
