= Pauline Curley =

American actress

Pauline Curley Peach
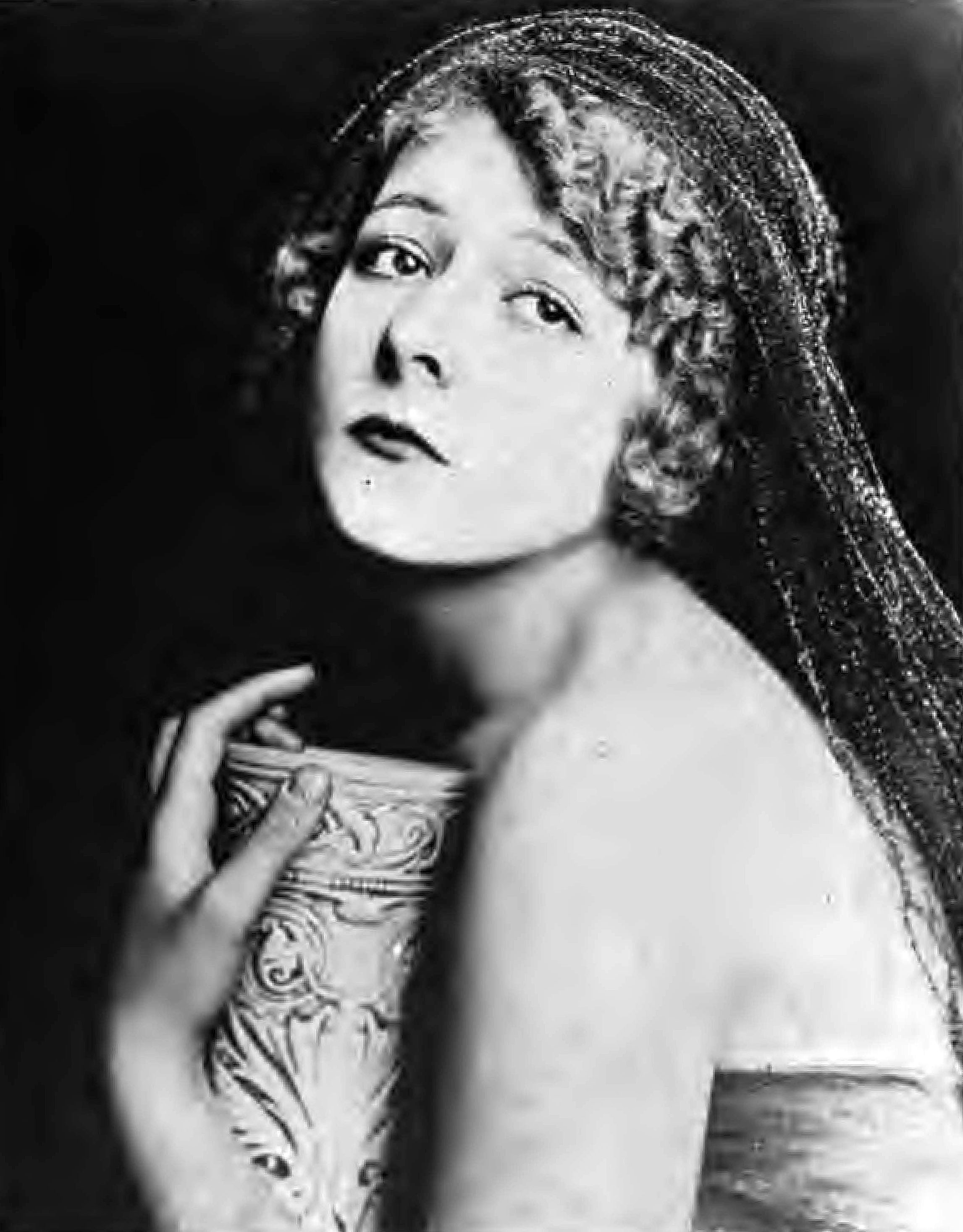
- Born: Pauline Curley; December 19, 1903; Holyoke, Massachusetts, U.S.
- Died: December 11, 2000 (aged 96); Santa Monica, California, U.S.
- Other names: Pauline Peach
- Occupation: Actress
- Years active: 1915–1928
- Spouse: Kenneth Peach (May 22, 1922- February 1988, his death)
- Children: 3

Pauline Curley (December 19, 1903 – December 11, 2000) was a vaudeville and silent film actress from Holyoke, Massachusetts. Her film career spanned much of the silent era, from 1915 to 1928.

== Early years ==
Pauline Curley was born in Holyoke, Massachusetts. Her mother, Rose Curley, brought her into show business at the age of 4, at first on stage in vaudeville shows. In 1910 at 6 years old Rose brought Pauline to New York City to find her work in the newly established silent movie industry and on the stage, getting her bit parts in a variety of movies, as well as weekly stage performances in Uncle Tom's Cabin and Little Lord Fauntleroy for the Jack Packard Stock Company. In 1915, she appeared on Broadway in the role of Rhods in Polygamy at the Park Theatre. Her mother gave different ages for Pauline depending on the requirements of the role, leaving her confused about her actual age, which she only learned in 1998 when she was 94.

== Acting career ==
Pauline Curley's acting career spanned the period of 1903 starting as a baby and finishing when she was 25 in 1929, after which she retired from acting although she retained a connection to the movie business through her cinematographer husband.

=== Entry into movies ===
Curley's first motion picture was Tangled Relations (1912). She played one of the children in a movie which starred Florence Lawrence and Owen Moore. For an audition for The Straight Road in 1914, Pauline was dressed as a boy to land a part as an orphan; a variety of such roles followed, "cornering the market in orphans and waifs".

In 1915 she played the ingenue Claudia Frawley in Life Without Soul, an adaptation of Mary Shelley's Frankenstein.

== Move to Hollywood ==
Her mother took Pauline Curley to Hollywood in 1917 in search of more lucrative work. She soon landed the role of Princess Irina of Russia in Herbert Brenon's The Fall of the Romanovs, her first Hollywood work and, according to Variety, her best known. In 1918 she was a leading lady in five films, including working as the leading lady in King Vidor's first full-length feature, The Turn in the Road.

Curley supported Douglas Fairbanks and Tully Marshall in Bound in Morocco (1918). This is a farcical tale of a young American's adventures in Morocco. In 1920 she was featured in The Invisible Hand, a Vitagraph serial with Brinsley Shaw and Antonio Moreno. It was directed by William J. Bauman. This was her first Western, a genre that would henceforth dominate her work.

In 1926 Curley played with Helen Chadwick, Jack Mulhall, and Emmett King, in The Naked Truth. It was a film about parents who failed to tell their children about the mysteries of life at the appropriate time. It deals with the consequences.

== Personal life ==
She married cinematographer Kenneth Peach in 1922, taking his last name as Pauline Curley Peach and remaining married until his death in 1988. They were married for nearly 66 years. They had three children, two sons and one daughter.

== Death ==
On December 16, 2000, Curley died 8 days before her 97th birthday of complications resulting from pneumonia at St. John's Hospital in Santa Monica.

== Selected filmography ==
- Life Without Soul (1915)
- The Fall of the Romanoffs (1917)
- The Square Deceiver (1917)
- Cassidy (1917)
- A Case at Law (1917)
- Her Boy (1918)
- The Landloper (1918)
- Bound in Morocco (1918)
- The Turn in the Road (1919)
- The Man Beneath (1919)
- The Valley of Tomorrow (1920)
- Hands Off! (1921)
- Judge Her Not (1921)
- The Prairie Mystery (1922)
- Midnight Secrets (1924)
- Prince of the Saddle (1926)
- Walloping Kid (1926)
- Pony Express Rider (1926)
- Thunderbolt's Tracks (1927)
- Devil Dogs (1928)
- Power (1928)
