= The Prairie Mystery =

1922 film

- Directed by: George Edwardes-Hall
- Written by: George Edwardes-Hall
- Produced by: Bud Osborne
- Starring: Bud Osborne; Pauline Curley; Pearlie Norton
- Cinematography: John S. Pastor
- Production company: Bud Osborne Feature Films
- Distributed by: Truart Film Corporation
- Release date: August 15, 1922
- Running time: 50 minutes
- Country: United States
- Languages: Silent; English intertitles

The Prairie Mystery is a 1922 American silent Western film directed by George Edwardes-Hall and starring Bud Osborne, Pauline Curley and Pearlie Norton. Given an initial premiere in 1922, it was re-distributed the following year by the recently established Truart Film Corporation.

== Cast ==
- Bud Osborne as Jim Holmes
- Pauline Curley
- Pearlie Norton
- Ben Hall
- Harry Girard
- Hazel Evans

== Bibliography ==
- Buck Rainey, Sweethearts of the sage: biographies and filmographies of 258 actresses appearing in western movies. McFarland, 1992.
