= Romance Road =

1925 silent film

- Directed by: Fred Windemere
- Starring: Raymond McKee; Billy Bletcher; Margery Meadows
- Cinematography: Lenwood Abbott
- Production company: Granada Productions
- Distributed by: Truart Film Corporation
- Release date: July 15, 1925
- Running time: 50 minutes
- Country: United States
- Languages: Silent; English intertitles

Romance Road is a 1925 American silent comedy film directed by Fred Windemere and starring Raymond McKee, Billy Bletcher and Margery Meadows.

== Plot summary ==
A Royal Canadian Mounted Police officer is sent to mediate between the railroad workers and the trappers and finds romance along the way.

== Cast ==
- Raymond McKee as Patrick O'Brien
- Billy Bletcher as Patrick's Pal
- Margery Meadows as Mary Van Tassler
- Dick Gordon as Arthur Waddington Watts
- Gertrude Claire as Ma O'Brien

== Bibliography ==
- Munden, Kenneth White. The American Film Institute Catalog of Motion Pictures Produced in the United States, Part 1. University of California Press, 1997.
