= Ernest Hilliard =

American actor (1890–1947)

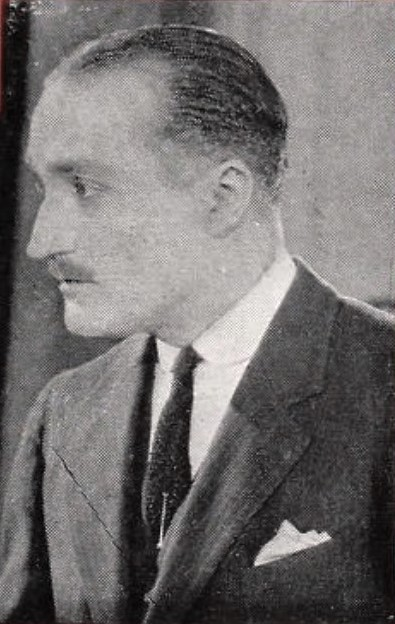
- From an advertisement for Galloping Hoofs (1924)
- Born: January 31, 1890; New York City, US
- Died: September 3, 1947 (aged 57); Santa Monica, California, US
- Occupation: Actor
- Years active: 1921–1947

Ernest Hilliard (January 31, 1890 – September 3, 1947) was an American actor. He appeared in more than 90 films between 1921 and 1947. He was born in New York City and died in Santa Monica, California, from a heart attack.

In March 1925 Hilliard spent three days in a Cuban jail after he was arrested for kissing a Cuban woman in an automobile during a carnival parade. He jumped onto the running board of one of the parade's cars, in which rode two women and their two male escorts, who were lawyers. A news report said, "The actor waved his arms and carried on as the Ciuban boys do in their wooing of girls, while the mardi gras merrymaking is in progress." After Americans intervened on Hilliard's behalf, President Zayas pardoned him.

== Selected filmography ==
- Tropical Love (1921)
- The Matrimonial Web (1921)
- Silver Wings (1922)
- Evidence (1922)
- Who Are My Parents? (1922)
- Married People (1922)
- Love's Old Sweet Song (1923)
- Man and Wife (1923)
- Modern Marriage (1923)
- The Recoil (1924)
- Trouping with Ellen (1924)
- Galloping Hoofs (1924)
- Broadway Lady (1925)
- White Mice (1926)
- The Frontier Trail (1926)
- Forest Havoc (1926)
- The High Flyer (1926)
- Winning the Futurity (1926)
- Broadway After Midnight (1927)
- Let It Rain (1927)
- The Midnight Watch (1927)
- The Scorcher (1927)
- The Racing Fool (1927)
- The Wheel of Destiny (1927)
- The Silent Hero (1927)
- A Bowery Cinderella (1927)
- Modern Daughters (1927)
- The Noose (1928)
- The Matinee Idol (1928)
- The Divine Sinner (1928)
- The Big Hop (1928)
- Dugan of the Dugouts (1928)
- Sinners in Love (1928)
- The Midnight Adventure (1928)
- Out with the Tide (1928)
- Burning Up Broadway (1928)
- Devil Dogs (1928)
- The Awful Truth (1929)
- The Broadway Hoofer (1929)
- Wall Street (1929)
- When Dreams Come True (1929)
- Dynamite (1929)
- Red Hot Rhythm (1929)
- Second Honeymoon (1930)
- Mother and Son (1931)
- Flirting with Danger (1934)
- The Boss Rider of Gun Creek (1936)
- Sea Spoilers (1936)
