= Broadway Daddies =

1928 silent film by Fred Windemere

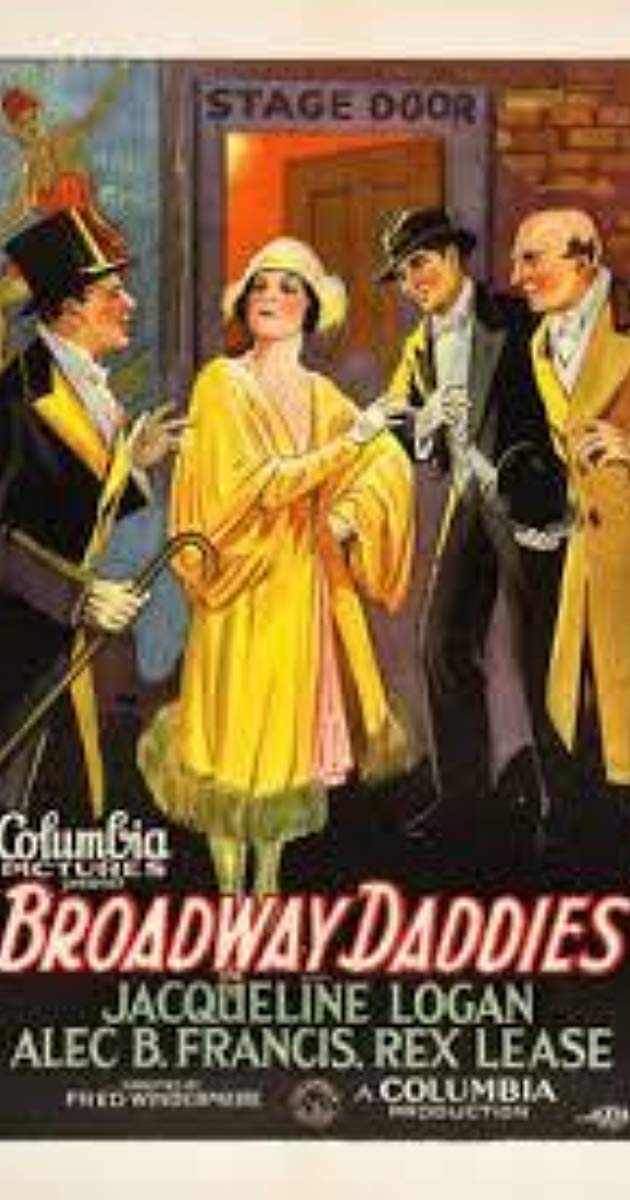
- Poster for the film
- Directed by: Fred Windemere
- Screenplay by: Anthony Coldewey (scenario)
- Story by: Victoria Moore
- Produced by: Harry Cohn
- Starring: Jacqueline Logan; Alec B. Francis; Rex Lease
- Cinematography: Silvano Balboni
- Edited by: Arthur Roberts
- Production company: Columbia Pictures
- Release date: April 7, 1928 (US)
- Running time: 62 minutes
- Country: United States
- Language: English

Broadway Daddies is a lost 1928 American silent melodrama film directed by Fred Windemere. It stars Jacqueline Logan, Alec B. Francis, Rex Lease, and was released on April 7, 1928.

== Plot ==
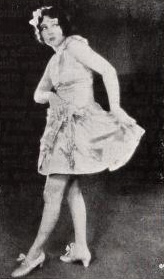
Jacqueline Logan as a cabaret dancer in the film

Eve Delmar is a pretty chorus line dancer, who is the center of attention of a group of wealthy admirers. However, she develops feelings for Richard Kennedy, who she assumes is not wealthy, but simply ambitious. Little does she know that Richard is in fact quite wealthy, the son of millionaire John Lambert Kennedy. He chooses not to reveal his status, because he wants Eve to fall in love with him, and not with his money.

When Eve finds out that Richard is wealthy, she feels that he was simply playing with her affections. To get back at him, she agrees to attend a party with another wealthy suitor, James Leech. The party turns quite raucous, and Leech tries to seduce Eve, but she rebuffs him. However, the events of the party appear in the newspaper, and both Richard and his father get the impression that Eve might have misbehaved.

Eve and Richard reconcile, and both he and John Kennedy understand that she did nothing untoward with anyone. This is further backed up when Leech appears and confirms that he had attempted to seduce her, but that she was the perfect lady and did not fall for his advances. Leech tells John that he owes the young lady an apology, and Richard and Eve continue their love affair.

== Cast ==
- Jacqueline Logan as Eve Delmar
- Alec B. Francis as John Lambert Kennedy
- Rex Lease as Richard Kennedy
- Phillips Smalley as James Leech
- De Sacia Mooers as Fay King
- Clarissa Selwynne as Mrs. Winthrop Forrest
- Betty Francisco as Agnes Forrest

== Production ==
In late February, it was revealed that Fred Windemere was chosen to helm the project, and Alec B. Francis would be starring in the picture. Production began in early March. In March, it was announced that Jacqueline Logan had been chosen to replace Bessie Love as the lead in the film. To prepare for her role, Logan spent time rehearsing with professional chorus line companies. In mid-March Columbia announced that Alec B. Francis and Rex Lease would have supporting roles. Production on the film was completed by the end of March. The film was the first release in April by Columbia, premiering on April 7.

== Reception ==
Harrison's Reports gave the picture a good review, although they found the plot a bit hackneyed, but did manage to hold the audience's interest. They enjoyed the performances of Logan, Francis and Lease.
