= Alphonse Martell =

French actor (1890–1976)

Alphonse Martell (1890 – 1976) was a French actor who wrote and directed Gigolettes of Paris (1933). He portrayed a director in the 1934 film I'll Be Suing You. He often portrayed a waiter as in the 1946 film Falcon's Alibi, in which he is murdered.

He appeared on TV shows including Climax! and Mission Impossible.

== Selected filmography ==
- A Fighting Heart (1924)
- After a Million (1924), as Ivan Senine
- South of the Equator (1924), as General's Aide
- The Prairie Wife (1925), as Count de Chateaunois (uncredited)
- Strings of Steel (1926), as Alexander Graham Bell
- The Mystery Club (1926), as Sengh
- Gigolo (film) (1926), as Waiter at Maxim's (uncredited)
- Grinning Guns (1927), as Tony the Dude
- Naughty Nanette (1927), as Carlton Mary
- She's My Baby (1927), as Alphonze Dabreau
- Dream of Love(1928), as Michonet
- The Night Bird (1928), as Pete
- The Divine Sinner (1928), as Paul Coudert
- Possessed (1931), as French Waiter (uncredited)
- Cocktail Hour (film) (1933), as French Butler (uncredited)
- Maid in Hollywood (1934)
- I'll Be Suing You (1934), as Director
- The Widow from Monte Carlo (1935)
- Manhattan Butterfly (1935)
- The Great Hotel Murder (1935)
- We Have Our Moments (1937), as Headwaiter
- Suez (film) (1938), as General St. Arnaud
- For Love or Money (1939), as Head Waiter
- The Bride Came C.O.D. (1941) as Headwaiter (uncredited)
- Give Out, Sisters (1942), as Headwaiter
- Enter Arsène Lupin (1944), as Conductor
- Pardon My Rhythm (1944), as Headwaiter
- Meet Miss Bobby Socks (1944), as Headwaiter (uncredited)
- Dick Tracy (1945), as Jules
- Blonde from Brooklyn (1945), as Maitre'd (uncredited)
- The Catman of Paris (1946), as Maurice
- Falcon's Alibi (1946)
- The Crime Doctor's Gamble (1947), as Institute Superintendent
- French Leave (1948 film), as Waiter
- The Story of Will Rogers (1952), as French Premier (uncredited)
