= The Radio King =

1922 film

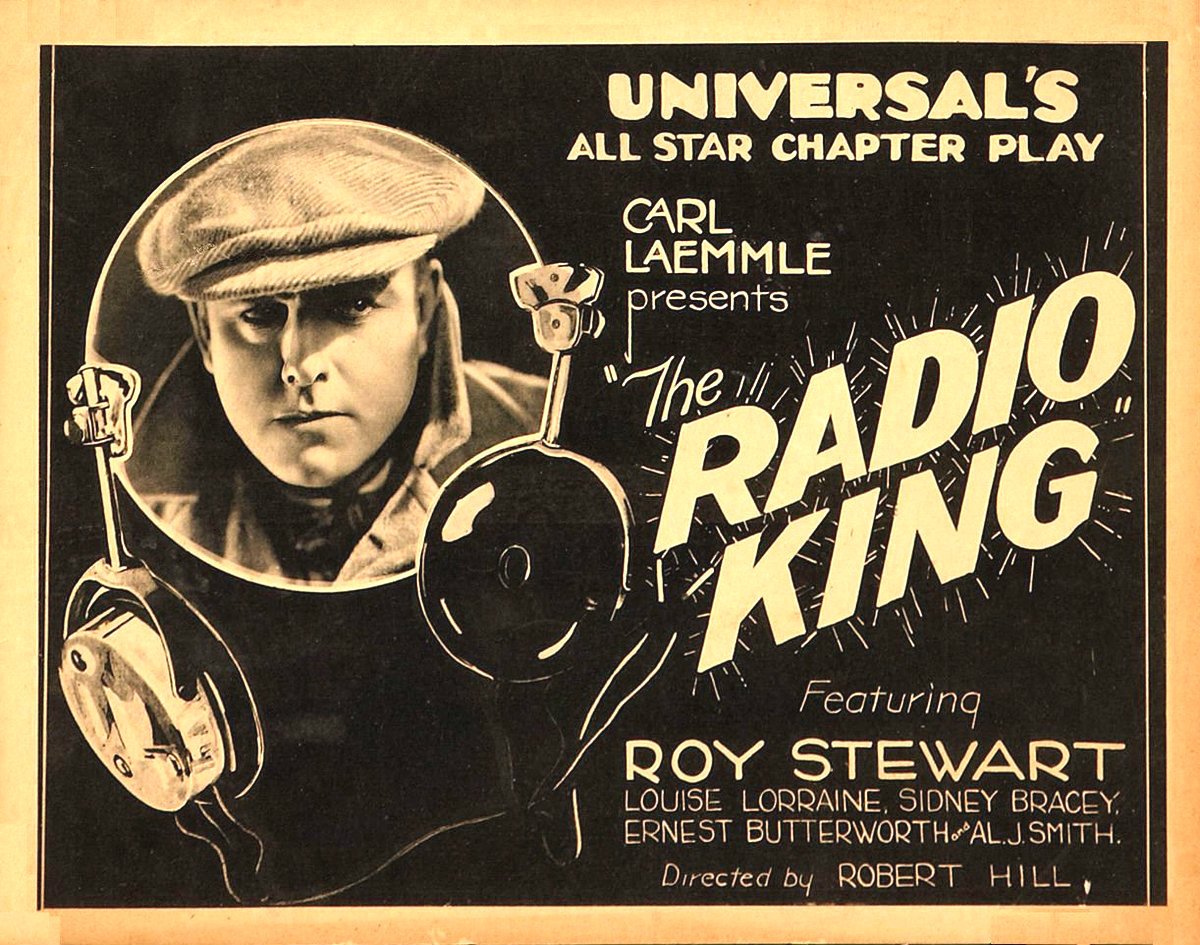
- Film poster
- Directed by: Robert F. Hill
- Written by: Robert Dillon
- Starring: Roy Stewart; Louise Lorraine
- Distributed by: Universal Film Manufacturing Co.
- Release date: October 30, 1922
- Running time: 10 episodes
- Country: United States
- Language: Silent (English intertitles)

The Radio King is a 1922 American adventure film serial directed by Robert F. Hill and released by the Universal Film Manufacturing Co. The ten chapters began with "A Cry for Help" released October 22, 1922. The film is now considered to be a lost film.

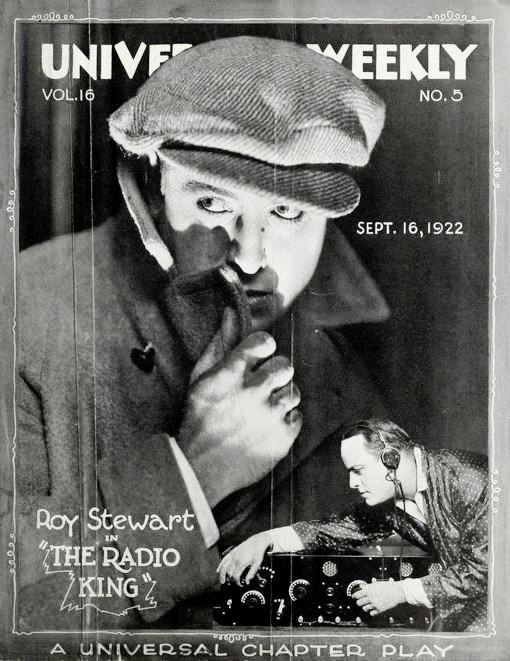
Still of Roy Stewart on cover of Universal Weekly (September 16, 1922)

== Cast ==
- Roy Stewart as Bradley Lane
- Louise Lorraine as Ruth Leyden
- Sidney Bracey as Marnee
- Albert J. Smith as Renally (credited as Al Smith)
- Clark Comstock as John Leyden
- Ernest Butterworth Jr. as Jim Lawton
- Fontaine La Rue as Doria
- Slim Whitaker as The Mystery Man
- Lew Meehan
- Marion Feducha (credited as Marion Faducha)
- Helen Broneau
- Joseph North
- D. Mitsoras (credited as D.J. Mitsoras)
- Laddie Earle
- Charles Force

== See also ==
- List of film serials
- List of film serials by studio
