= Ruth Dwyer (actress) =

American actress (1898–1978)

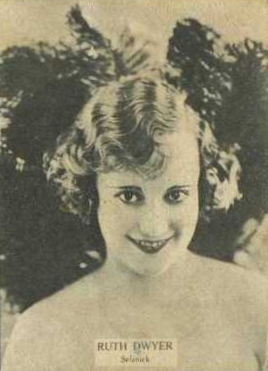
- Born: Ruth Mildred Dwyer; January 25, 1898; Brooklyn, New York, U.S.
- Died: March 2, 1978 (aged 80); Los Angeles, California, U.S.
- Occupation: Actress
- Years active: 1919 - 1943 (film)
- Spouse: William Jackie (died 1954)

Ruth Mildred Dwyer (January 25, 1898 – March 2, 1978) was an American film actress. She had a number of starring roles in the silent era, most famously as Buster Keaton's leading lady in Seven Chances (1925). Dwyer mostly retired in 1928 and played a number of uncredited roles in sound films, but retired from the film business completely in the 1940s.

== Early life and career ==
Dwyer was the eldest of two daughters born to Lydia Hope Strong and Christian A. Dwyer. Her sister Ethel Selina Dwyer also had a brief silent film career although best known as "Jane" opposite Ronald Adair in the 1921 Broadway production of Tarzan of the Apes. Dwyer initially acted in school productions in Brooklyn, after which she and her sister performed on stage. A "test for motion pictures" resulted in her going to Hollywood to pursue work in films.

Dwyer's entertainment career began with her working as a dancer in New York. Her performance in the chorus line in an off-Broadway production in 1919 led to her going to Hollywood. Her film debut came in the serial The Evil Eye.

After a marriage and divorce, Dwyer was married to actor and talent agent William Jackie until his death in 1954. They operated the Ruth Dwyer Agency in San Francisco, helping people obtain parts in films and television shows.

Dwyer died on March 2, 1978, at the Motion Picture Country House and Hospital in Woodland Hills, California.

== Selected filmography ==
- The Evil Eye (1920)
- The Stealers (1920)
- Clay Dollars (1921)
- Second Hand Love (1923)
- His Mystery Girl (1923)
- After a Million (1924)
- Broadway or Bust (1924)
- Jack O'Clubs (1924)
- The Reckless Age (1924)
- Dark Stairways (1924)
- The Covered Trail (1924)
- Cornered (1924)
- The Gambling Fool (1925)
- Going the Limit (1925)
- Seven Chances (1925)
- The Fear Fighter (1925)
- Crack o' Dawn (1925)
- The Canvas Kisser (1925)
- White Fang (1925)
- The Patent Leather Pug (1926)
- Stepping Along (1926)
- The Brown Derby (1926)
- A Man of Quality (1926)
- A Hero for a Night (1927)
- The Lost Limited (1927)
- White Pants Willie (1927)
- The Racing Fool (1927)
- The Nest (1927)
- A Perfect Gentleman (1928)
- Sailors' Wives (1928)
- Alex the Great (1928)

== Bibliography ==
- Munden, Kenneth White. The American Film Institute Catalog of Motion Pictures Produced in the United States, Part 1. University of California Press, 1997.
