= Unknown Treasures =

1926 film

- Directed by: Archie Mayo
- Written by: Charles A. Logue (screenplay); Mary Spain Vigus (story)
- Starring: Gladys Hulette; Robert Agnew; John Miljan
- Cinematography: Harry Davis
- Production company: Sterling Pictures
- Distributed by: Sterling Pictures
- Release date: September 1, 1926
- Running time: 63 minutes
- Country: United States
- Languages: Silent; English intertitles

Unknown Treasures is a 1926 American silent horror film directed by Archie Mayo and starring Gladys Hulette, Robert Agnew and John Miljan. The screenplay by Charles A. Logue was based on a short story written by Mary Spain Vigus called The House Behind the Hedge. Although the film is considered lost today, it is said to have been a straight forward "old dark house" film without the usual 1920s comedy elements. Gustav von Seyffertitz plays the mad doctor in the film, and later went on to appear in several other horror films, including The Bat Whispers (1930) and Son of Frankenstein (1939). Director Mayo started out making comedic shorts, but moved on in later life to directing more prestigious films. He only directed two horror films however, this one and Svengali (1931 film).

== Plot ==
Bob Ramsey is in love with Mary Hamilton, and he comes to suspect that her Uncle Cyrus has hidden a fortune in stolen bonds somewhere in his mansion. Bob tries to discover the hiding place of the old man's fortune, but only succeeds in getting involved in a complicated murder plot. A mad scientist named Dr. Simmons has trained a gorilla to kill people who get in his way.

== Cast ==
- Gladys Hulette as Mary Hamilton
- Robert Agnew as Bob Ramsey
- John Miljan as Ralph Cheneey
- Bertram Marburgh as Cyrus Hamilton
- Jed Prouty as Remus
- Gustav von Seyffertitz as Simmons

== Bibliography ==
- Goble, Alan. The Complete Index to Literary Sources in Film. Walter de Gruyter, 1999.
