= Louise Lorraine =

American film actress (1904–1981)

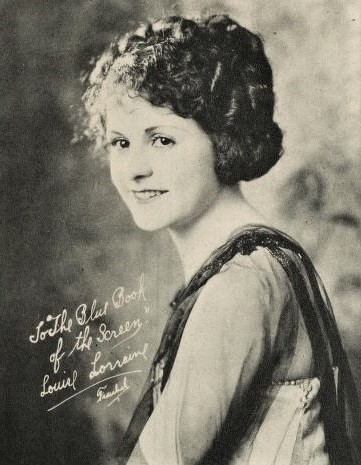
- Lorraine in 1923
- Born: Louise Escovar; October 1, 1904; San Francisco, California, U.S.
- Died: February 2, 1981 (aged 76); New York City, U.S.
- Resting place: Forest Lawn Memorial Park, Hollywood Hills, California
- Occupation: Actress
- Years active: 1920–1932
- Spouses: Art Acord (m. 1926; div. 1928) Chester Hubbard (m. 1930; died 1963)
- Children: 2

Louise Lorraine (born Louise Escovar; October 1, 1904 – February 2, 1981) was an American actress.

== Life and career ==
Louise Lorraine was born Louise Escovar in San Francisco, California.

Lorraine began working in films as an extra and "a bathing girl" before she gained leading roles in comedies for independent studios. After that, she spent time at MGM and Universal. She became very popular in action-filled serials such as The Radio King and With Stanley in Africa in 1922.

She was the third actress to portray Jane, having portrayed the character in the 1921 movie serial The Adventures of Tarzan. She starred in only five talkies in her film career, including Near the Rainbow's End (1930), co-starring Bob Steele.

=== Career after silent cinema ===
Lorraine left the film industry in the early 1930s after Hollywood transitioned to sound films. Her last film was Highway 101 (1931), after which she retired from acting and dedicated herself to family life.

== Personal life ==
Lorraine was divorced from actor Art Acord in 1928. Her marriage to Chester J. Hubbard lasted until 1962, his death. She died on February 2, 1981, aged 76, in New York City, from undisclosed causes. She is interred at Forest Lawn - Hollywood Hills Cemetery.

== Partial filmography ==
- Elmo the Fearless (1920)
- The Flaming Disc (1920)
- The Adventures of Tarzan (1921)
- The Fire Eater (1921)
- With Stanley in Africa (1922)
- Headin' West (1922)
- The Radio King (1922)
- The Altar Stairs (1922)
- The Gentleman from America (1923)
- The Oregon Trail (1923)
- McGuire of the Mounted (1923)
- A Midsummer Night's Scream (1923)
- The Great Circus Mystery (1925)
- Borrowed Finery (1925)
- The Wild Girl (1925)
- Three in Exile (1925)
- The Verdict (1925)
- The Silent Guardian (1925)
- Pals (1925)
- The Blue Streak (1926)
- Exit Smiling (1926)
- The Silent Flyer (1926)
- The Stolen Ranch (1926)
- Winners of the Wilderness (1927)
- Rookies (1927)
- Hard Fists (1927)
- The Frontiersman (1927)
- Legionnaires in Paris (1927)
- Baby Mine (1928)
- Circus Rookies (1928)
- A Final Reckoning (1928)
- The Wright Idea (1928)
- Chinatown Charlie (1928)
- Shadows of the Night (1928)
- The Diamond Master (1929)
- The Mounted Stranger (1930)
- Beyond the Law (1930)
- The Jade Box (1930)
- The Lightning Express (1930)
- Near the Rainbow's End (1930)
- Moonlight and Cactus (1932)
