= After a Million =

1924 film directed by Jack Nelson

- Directed by: Jack Nelson
- Produced by: Anthony J. Xydias
- Starring: Kenneth McDonalds; Ruth Dwyer
- Production company: Sunset Productions
- Distributed by: Aywon Film Corporation
- Release date: 15 April 1924
- Running time: 5 reels
- Country: United States
- Language: Silent..English intertitles

After a Million is a 1924 American silent comedy film starring Kenneth McDonalds and Ruth Dwyer and directed by Jack Nelson.

This film survives in the Library of Congress.

== Cast ==
- Kenneth MacDonald - Gregory Maxim
- Ruth Dwyer - Countess Olga
- Alphonse Martell - Ivan Senine
- Joe Girard -
- Hal Craig -
- Jay Hunt -
- S.J. Bingham - (*as Stanley Bingham)
- Ada Bell -
- Victor Metzetti -
- Otto Metzetti -
- Stella Nova -
- Paul Gerson -
- Martin Turner -
- Jack Waltemeyer -
