= The Racing Fool =

1927 film

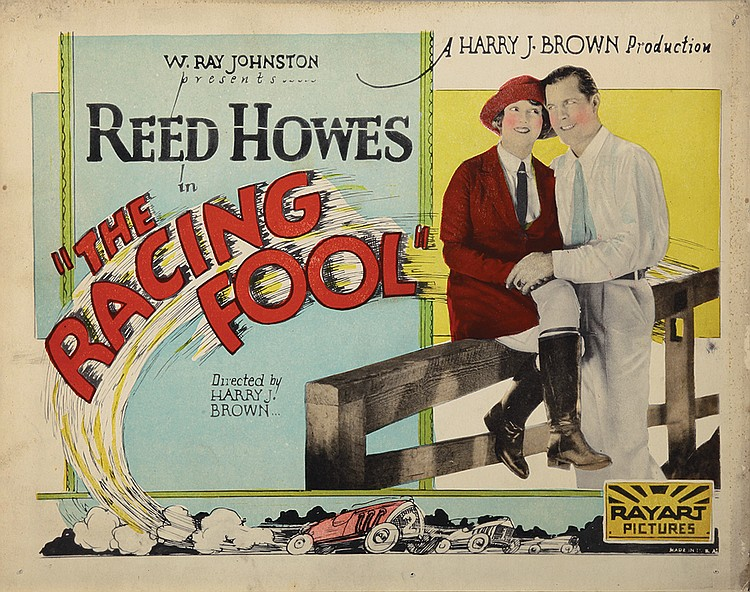
- Directed by: Harry Joe Brown
- Written by: George W. Pyper
- Produced by: Harry Joe Brown; W. Ray Johnston
- Starring: Reed Howes; Ruth Dwyer; Ernest Hilliard
- Cinematography: Ben White
- Production company: Harry J. Brown Productions
- Distributed by: Rayart Pictures
- Release date: August 1927
- Country: United States
- Languages: Silent; English intertitles

The Racing Fool is a 1927 American silent action film directed by Harry Joe Brown and starring Reed Howes, Ruth Dwyer and Ernest Hilliard.

== Cast ==
- Reed Howes as Jack Harlowe
- Ruth Dwyer as Helen Drake
- Ernest Hilliard as Colwyn Kane
- Billy Franey as Henry Briggs
- James Bradbury Sr. as Tom Harlowe
- Miles McCarthy as Cornelius Drake

== Bibliography ==
- Munden, Kenneth White. The American Film Institute Catalog of Motion Pictures Produced in the United States, Part 1. University of California Press, 1997.
