= The Man Without a Conscience =

1925 film

- Directed by: James Flood
- Screenplay by: Louis D. Lighton; Hope Loring
- Story by: Max Kretzer
- Starring: Willard Louis; Irene Rich; June Marlowe; John Patrick; Robert Agnew; Helen Dunbar
- Production company: Warner Bros.
- Distributed by: Warner Bros.
- Release date: June 7, 1925
- Running time: 70 minutes
- Country: United States
- Language: Silent (English intertitles)

The Man Without a Conscience is a 1925 American silent drama film directed by James Flood and written by Louis D. Lighton and Hope Loring. The film stars Willard Louis, Irene Rich, June Marlowe, John Patrick, Robert Agnew, and Helen Dunbar. The film was released by Warner Bros. on June 7, 1925. A print of The Man Without a Conscience is extant at the Danish Film Institute in Copenhagen, Denmark.

== Plot ==
As described in a film magazine review, Amos Mason ruthlessly takes the savings of his fiancée Ann Sherman and then casts her aside when he succeeds in his scheme in New York City to make a fortune rapidly. He causes Ann to be discharged when she finds a position with the Graves family. Amos becomes involved in a real estate business which grows quickly. He employs James Warren to build his mansion. James has married Ann, who tells her husband of the trickery of Amos. Amos and Shirley Graves have married, and a child is born to them. However, Shirley does not love Amos, and cares instead for Douglas White. After the child is born, Amos' trickery is found out and he is sent to prison. There he repents, and after he is released he returns to his wife who is waiting for him with more affection than before.

== Cast ==
- Willard Louis as Amos Mason
- Irene Rich as Shirley Graves
- June Marlowe as Ann Sherman
- John Patrick as Douglas White
- Robert Agnew as James Warren
- Helen Dunbar as Mrs. Graves
- Kate Price as Mrs. McBride
