= Near the Rainbow's End =

1930 film

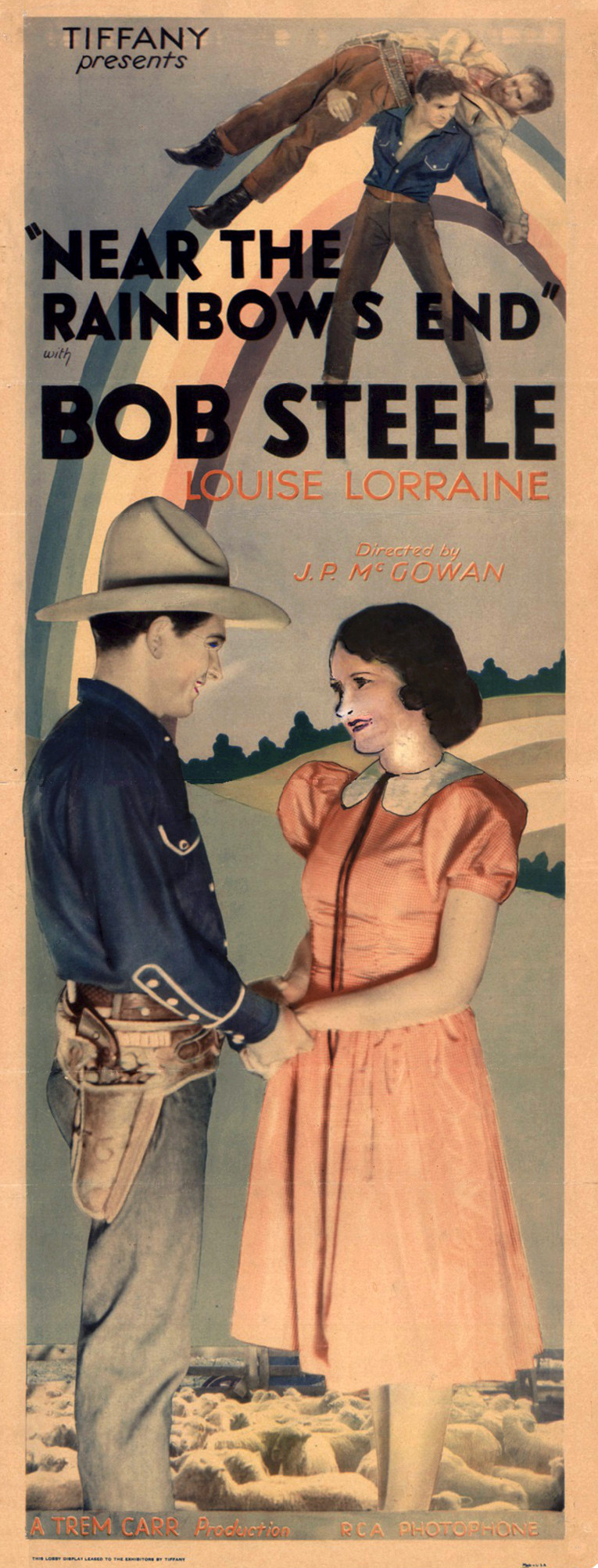
- Film poster
- Directed by: J. P. McGowan
- Written by: Charles A. Post
- Screenplay by: Sally Winters
- Produced by: Trem Carr
- Starring: Bob Steele; Lafe McKee; Al Ferguson
- Cinematography: Hap Depew; T. E. Jackson
- Edited by: Charles J. Hunt
- Production company: Tiffany Productions
- Distributed by: Tiffany Productions
- Release date: June 10, 1930 (U.S.)
- Running time: 57 minutes
- Country: United States
- Language: English

Near the Rainbow's End is a 1930 American Western film directed by J. P. McGowan for Tiffany Productions. The film stars Bob Steele in his talking picture debut as a singing cowboy, Lafe McKee and Al Ferguson and was commercially released in the United States on June 10, 1930.

== Plot ==
Rancher Tug Wilson (Alfred Hewston) discovers his mate's diabolical scheme, only to be killed instantly. The criminal rancher, Buck Rankin (Al Ferguson), is guilty of killing the Bledsoes' cattle. Buck blames Tug's death on Jim (Bob Steele), the son of Tom Bledsoe (Lafe McKee). Seeking revenge, Tug's daughter Ruth (Louise Lorraine) joins a movement led by Buck to kill Jim. Jim narrowly escapes his first capture attempt but knows he will not make it far. Luckily for him, a sheep herder has witnessed Buck killing Tug and the cattle. With the truth out, Sheriff Hank Bosley (Hank Bell), who was initially on Buck's side, promptly arrests the guilty rancher.

== Cast ==
- Bob Steele as Jim Bledsoe
- Lafe McKee as Tom Bledsoe
- Al Ferguson as Buck Rankin
- Alfred Hewston as Tug Wilson
- Louise Lorraine as Ruth Wilson
- Hank Bell as Sheriff Hank Bosley

== See also ==
- Bob Steele filmography

== Bibliography ==
- Fagen, Herb (2003). The Encyclopedia of Westerns. New York: Facts On File. ISBN 978-0816044566.
