= Truart Film Corporation =

American silent film production company

Truart Film Corporation was an American film production and distribution company active during the silent era. Actors Larry Semon and Elaine Hammerstein starred in a number of the company's productions. Truart Film Corporation distributed independent productions on the States' rights market. In the 1922-1926 period, M. H. Hoffman was General Advisory Director, and then Vice President of Truart Film Corporation, a New York production and film exchange company.

== Filmography ==
- Patsy (1921)
- The Prairie Mystery (1922)
- The Western Musketeer (1922)
- The Cub Reporter (1922)
- Women Men Marry (1922)
- The Drums of Jeopardy (1923)
- Riders of the Range (1923)
- The Unknown Purple (1923)
- The Empty Cradle (1923)
- Broadway Gold (1923)
- Let's Go (1923)
- In Fast Company (1924)
- Daring Love (1924)
- The Torrent (1924)
- On Time (1924)
- The Cowboy and the Flapper (1924)
- The Desert Sheik (1924)
- The Virgin (1924)
- Stepping Lively (1924)
- Laughing at Danger (1924)
- American Manners (1924)
- Youth and Adventure (1925)
- Brand of Cowardice (1925)
- The Mysterious Stranger (1925)
- The Thoroughbred (1925)
- Romance Road (1925)
- Where the Worst Begins (1925)
- Pals (1925)
- The Prince of Pep (1925)
- The Wild Girl (1925)
- The Fighting Cub (1925)
- The Reckless Sex (1925)
- The Silent Guardian (1925)
- Jimmie's Millions (1925)
- The Wall Street Whiz (1925)
- Tearing Through (1925)
- The Verdict (1925)
- The Fighting Demon (1925)
- The Sporting Chance (1925)
- Passionate Youth (1925)
- Three in Exile (1925)
- Dollar Down (1925)
- Soiled (1925)
- The Blue Streak (1926)
- The Hurricane (1926)
- The Merry Cavalier (1926)
- The Devil's Partner (1926)
- The Night Patrol (1926)
- The Broadway Gallant (1926)

== Sources ==
- Slide, Anthony. The New Historical Dictionary of the American Film Industry. Routledge, 2014.
