= Beyond the Law (1930 film) =

1930 film directed by J. P. McGowan

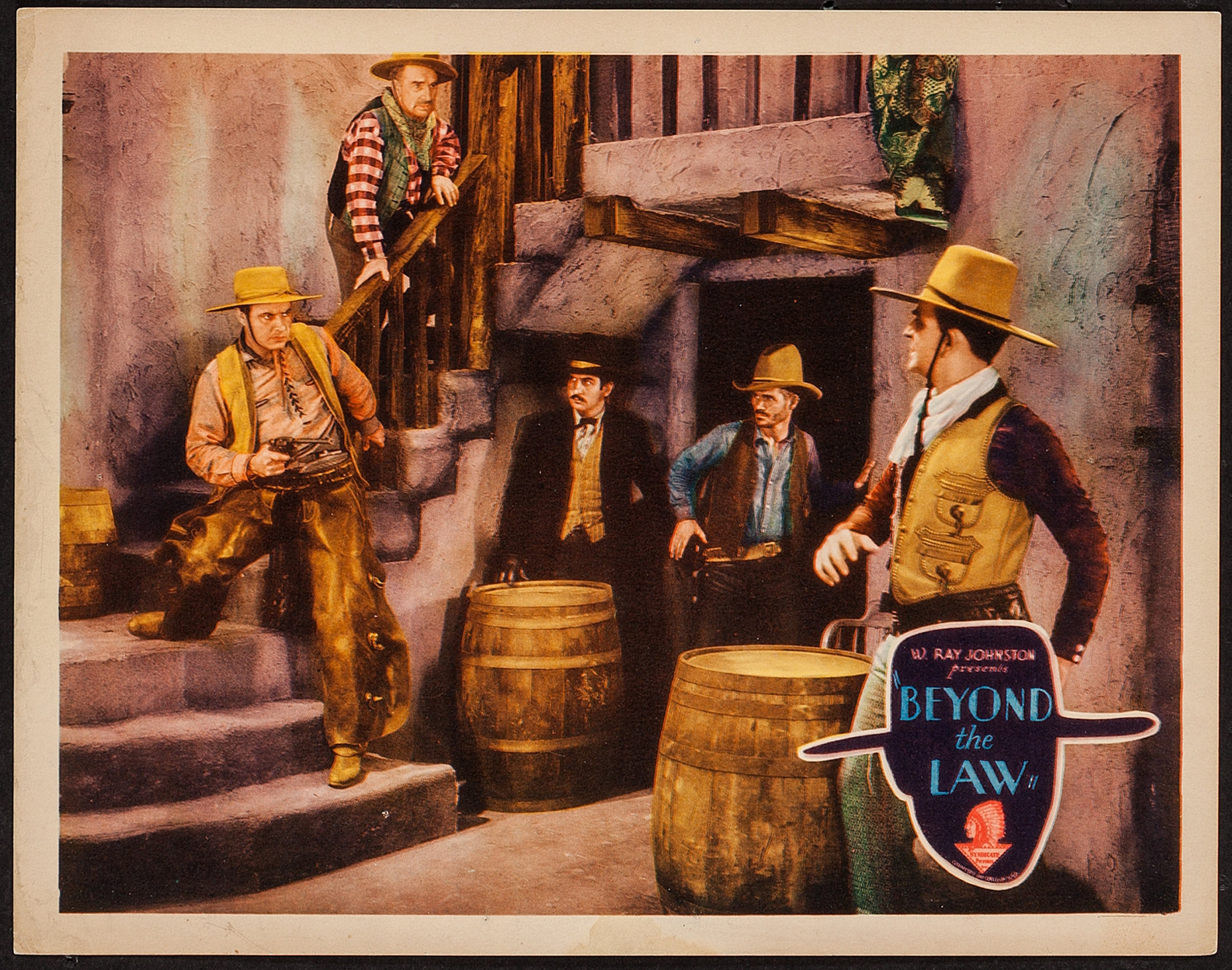
- Lobby Card
- Directed by: J. P. McGowan
- Written by: George Arthur Durlam
- Produced by: George Arthur Durlam; W. Ray Johnston
- Starring: Robert Frazer; Lane Chandler; Louise Lorraine
- Cinematography: Harry Neumann
- Edited by: Arthur A. Brooks
- Production company: Raytone Talking Pictures
- Distributed by: Syndicate Film Exchange
- Release date: November 2, 1930
- Running time: 60 minutes
- Country: United States
- Language: English

Beyond the Law is a 1930 American western film directed by J. P. McGowan and starring Robert Frazer, Lane Chandler and Louise Lorraine. It was one of the final productions of the independent Rayart Pictures, under the name Raytone Talking Pictures. The company was later revived as Monogram Pictures.

== Plot ==
Two cowboys assists locals on the California-Nevada border who are being terrorized by gang.

== Cast ==
- Robert Frazer as Dan Wright
- Lane Chandler as Jack-Knife
- Louise Lorraine as Barbara Ringold
- Charles King as Brand
- Edward Lynch as Jack Slade
- Robert Graves as Stoney Stone
- Will Walling as Mr. Ringold
- Jimmy Kane asTed Ringold
- Franklyn Farnum as Army Lieutenant
- Harry Holden as Sheriff Stone
- George Hackathorne as Monty

== Bibliography ==
- Pitts, Michael R. Poverty Row Studios, 1929–1940. McFarland & Company, 2005.
- Slide, Anthony. The New Historical Dictionary of the American Film Industry. Routledge, 2014.
