= The Covered Trail =

1924 film

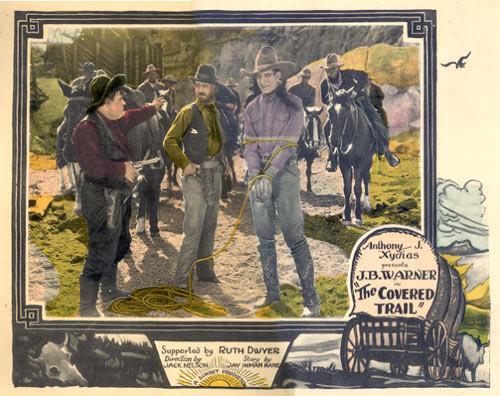
- Directed by: Jack Nelson
- Produced by: Anthony J. Xydias
- Starring: J.B. Warner; Robert McKenzie; Ruth Dwyer
- Production company: Sunset Productions
- Distributed by: Aywon Film Corporation
- Release date: May 16, 1924
- Running time: 50 minutes
- Country: United States
- Languages: Silent; English intertitles

The Covered Trail is a 1924 American silent Western film directed by Jack Nelson and starring J.B. Warner, Robert McKenzie and Ruth Dwyer.

== Cast ==
- J.B. Warner as Bill Keats
- Robert McKenzie as Sheriff
- Ruth Dwyer
- Milburn Morante

== Preservation ==
With no holdings located in archives, The Covered Trail is considered a lost film.
