= Elmo the Fearless =

1920 film directed by J. P. McGowan

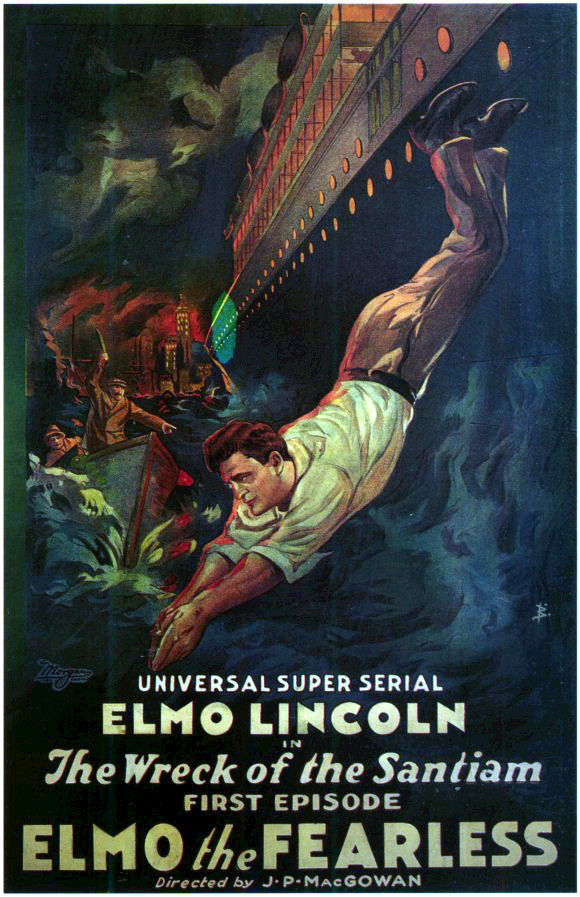
- Theatrical poster
- Directed by: J. P. McGowan
- Written by: Arthur Henry Goodson
- Starring: Elmo Lincoln; Louise Lorraine
- Production company: Great Western Producing Company
- Distributed by: Universal Film Manufacturing Company
- Release date: February 9, 1920
- Running time: 18 episodes
- Country: United States
- Languages: Silent; English intertitles

Elmo the Fearless is a 1920 American silent action adventure film serial directed by J. P. McGowan and starring Elmo Lincoln and Louise Lorraine. The film is now considered to be lost.

== Cast ==
- Elmo Lincoln as The Stranger
- Louise Lorraine as Edith Stillwell
- William N. Chapman as Robert Stillwell (credited as William Chapman)
- Ray Watson as Paul Horton
- Frank Ellis as Dan Bulger
- V. L. Barnes as Checko
- Gordon McGregor as Guy Hatherton
- J. P. McGowan
- Monte Montague

== Chapter titles ==
1. The Wreck of the Santiam
2. The Racing Death
3. The Life Line
4. The Flames of Death
5. The Smugglers' Cave
6. The Battle Under the Sea
7. The House of Mystery
8. The Fatal Crossing
9. The Assassin's Knife
10. The Fatal Bullet
11. The Temple of the Dragon
12. Crashing Through
13. The Hand on the Latch
14. The Avalanche
15. The Burning Fuse
16. The House of Intrigue
17. The Trap
18. The Fatal Letter (alternate title: The Fateful Letter)

== See also ==
- List of American films of 1920
- List of film serials
- List of film serials by studio
