= Hands Off! (film) =

1921 film

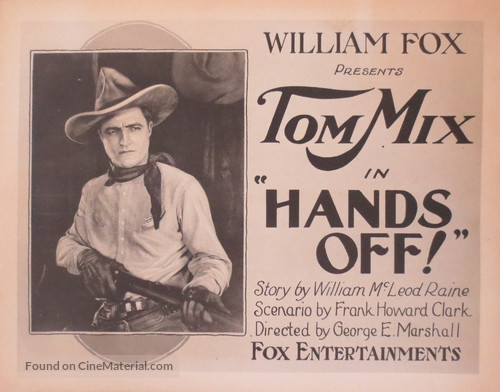
- Directed by: George Marshall
- Written by: Frank Howard Clark; William MacLeod Raine
- Produced by: William Fox
- Starring: Tom Mix; Pauline Curley; Charles K. French
- Cinematography: Benjamin H. Kline
- Production company: Fox Film Corporation
- Distributed by: Fox Film Corporation
- Release date: April 3, 1921
- Running time: 50 minutes
- Country: United States
- Languages: Silent; English intertitles

Hands Off! is a 1921 American silent Western film directed by George Marshall and starring Tom Mix, Pauline Curley and Charles K. French.

== Cast ==
- Tom Mix as Tex Roberts
- Pauline Curley as Ramona Wadley
- Charles K. French as Clint Wadley
- Lloyd Bacon as Ford Wadley
- Frank Clark as Capt. Jim Ellison
- Sid Jordan as Pete Dinsmore
- Merrill McCormick as Tony Alviro
- Virginia Warwick as Bonita
- Jack Dill as The Terrible Swede
- Marvin Loback as Jumbo

== Bibliography ==
- Connelly, Robert B. The Silents: Silent Feature Films, 1910-36, Volume 40, Issue 2. December Press, 1998.
- Munden, Kenneth White. The American Film Institute Catalog of Motion Pictures Produced in the United States, Part 1. University of California Press, 1997.
- Solomon, Aubrey. The Fox Film Corporation, 1915-1935: A History and Filmography. McFarland, 2011.
