= The Wild Girl (1925 film) =

1925 silent film by Billy Bletcher

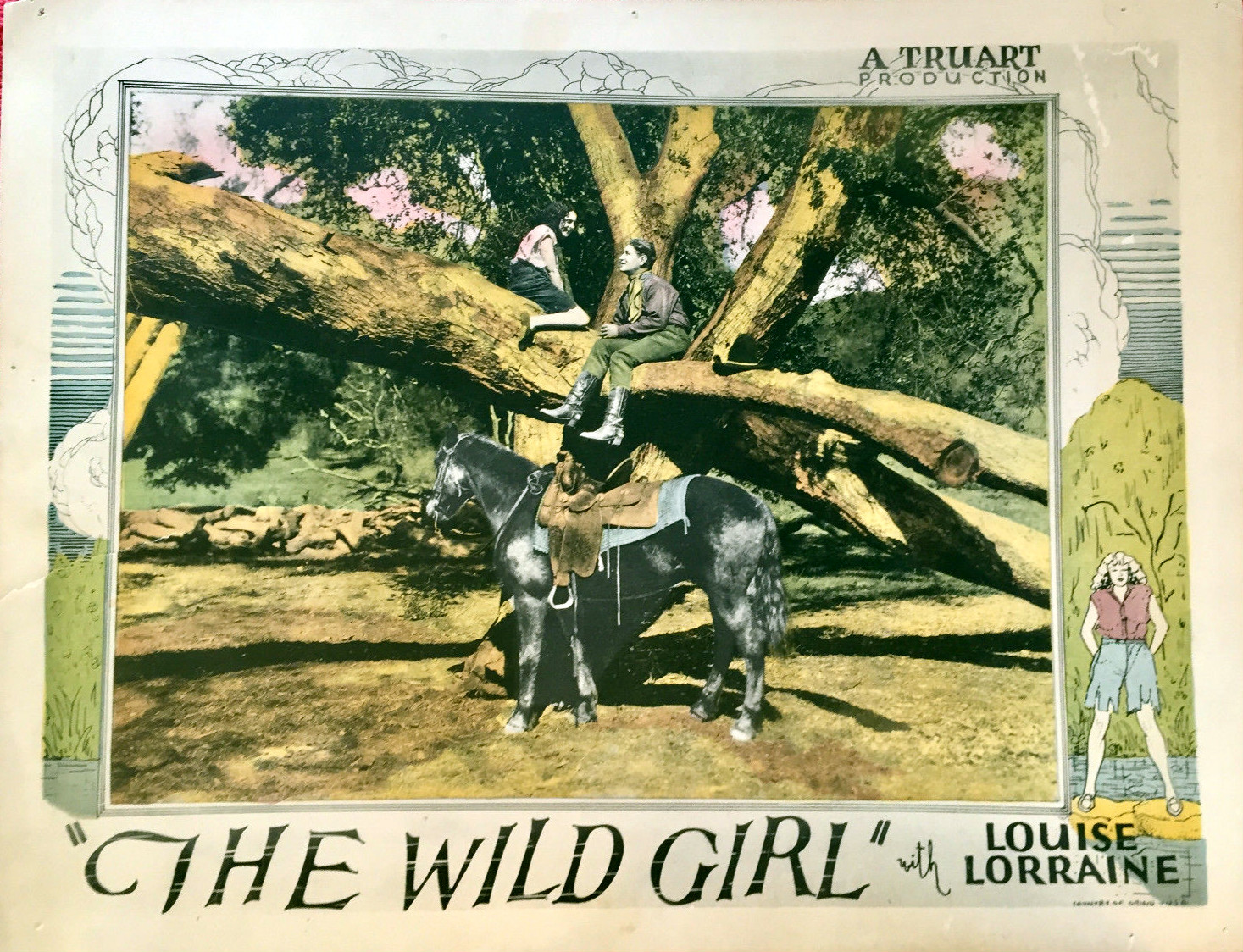
- Lobby card
- Directed by: Billy Bletcher
- Produced by: Phil Goldstone
- Starring: Louise Lorraine; Art Acord; Andrew Waldron
- Production company: Phil Goldstone Productions
- Distributed by: Truart Film Corporation
- Release date: October 10, 1925
- Running time: 50 minutes
- Country: United States
- Language: Silent (English intertitles)

The Wild Girl is a 1925 American silent drama film directed by Billy Bletcher and starring Louise Lorraine, Art Acord, and Andrew Waldron.

== Plot ==
As described in a film magazine review, Pattie, a mountain girl accompanied by her canine companion Rex meets an amateur photographer near her home. They exchange opinions, and the man learns that the stranger loves his horse as much as she loves her dog. When a mountaineer attempts to force Pattie to marry him, the dog warns the stranger of the girl's danger. He dashes to the rescue, and later makes a happy compact with the young woman.

== Cast ==
- Louise Lorraine as Pattie
- Art Acord as Billy Woodruff
- Andrew Waldron as Grandpapa Toto
- Rex the Dog as Rex
- Black Beauty the Horse as Black Beauty

== Bibliography ==
- Munden, Kenneth White. The American Film Institute Catalog of Motion Pictures Produced in the United States, Part 1. University of California Press, 1997.
