= Devil Dogs (film) =

1928 film directed by Fred Windemere

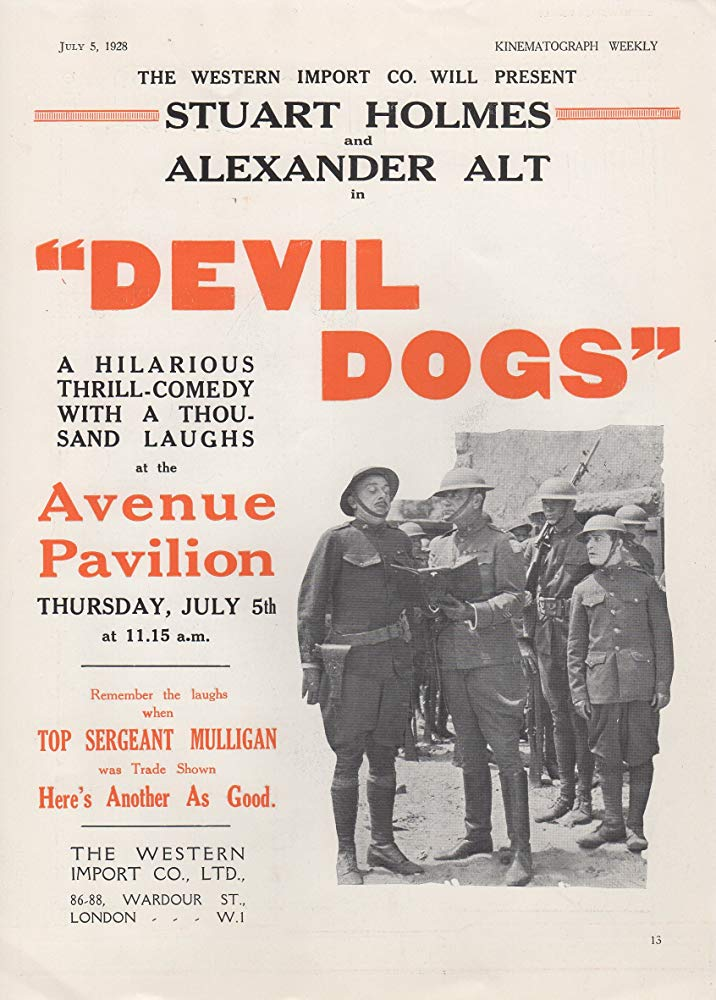
- British poster
- Directed by: Fred Windemere
- Written by: Maxine Alton; Adele Buffington; Al Martin
- Produced by: Morris R. Schlank
- Starring: Pauline Curley; Stuart Holmes
- Cinematography: Robert E. Cline
- Production company: Crescent Pictures
- Distributed by: Anchor Film Distributors
- Release date: August 23, 1928
- Running time: 55 minutes
- Country: United States
- Languages: Silent; English intertitles

Devil Dogs is a 1928 American silent comedy film directed by Fred Windemere and starring Pauline Curley and Stuart Holmes. It takes place during World War I.

== Cast ==
- Al Alt as Archie Van Stratten
- Pauline Curley as Joyce Moore
- Stuart Holmes as Sgt. Gordon White
- Ernest Hilliard as Lt. Holmes
- J.P. McGowan as Capt. Standing

== Bibliography ==
- Munden, Kenneth White. The American Film Institute Catalog of Motion Pictures Produced in the United States, Part 1. University of California Press, 1997.
