= Broadway After Midnight =

1927 film

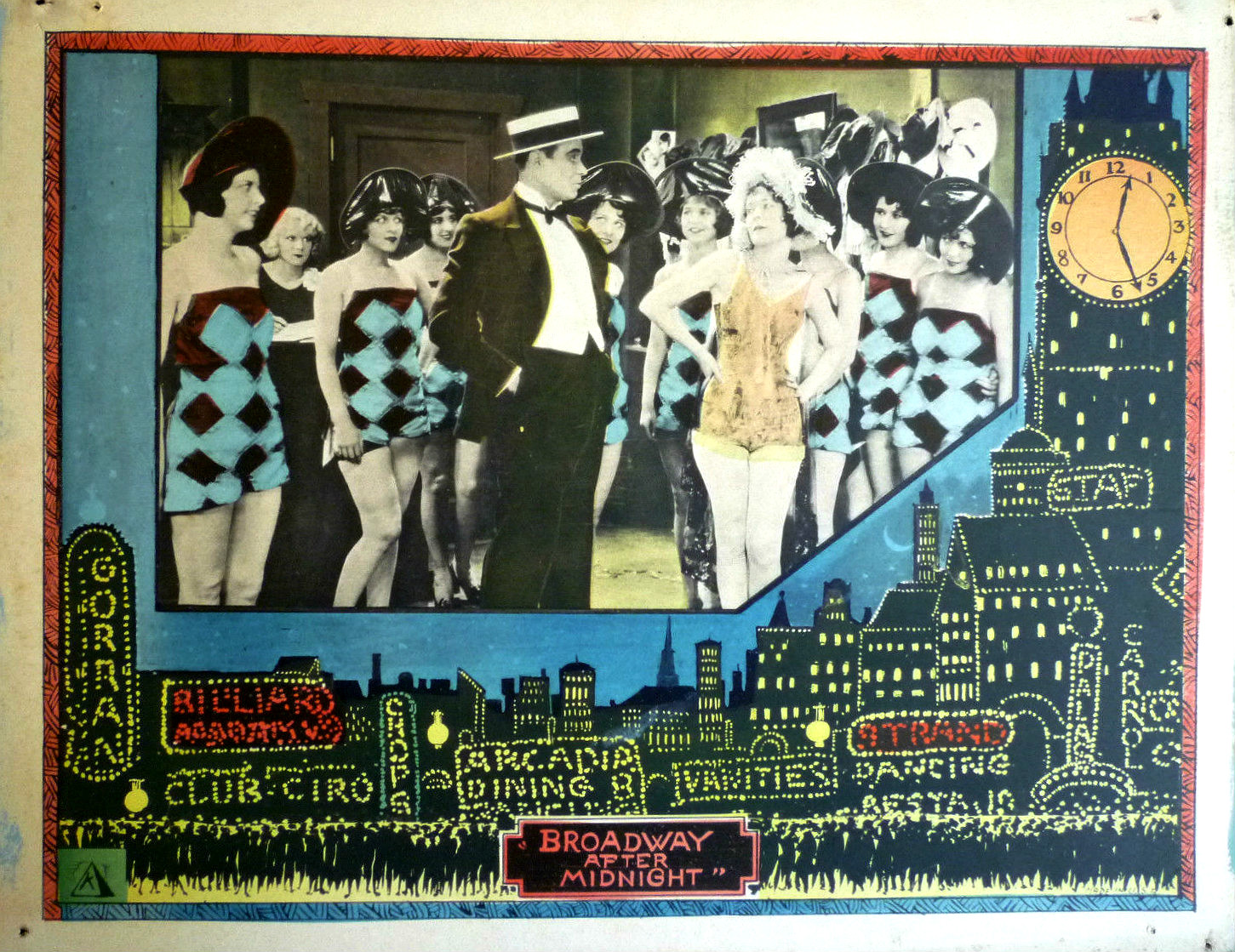
- Lobby card
- Directed by: Fred Windemere
- Written by: Frederic Bartel (story); Adele Buffington
- Produced by: Sherman S. Krellberg
- Starring: Matthew Betz; Priscilla Bonner; Cullen Landis; Gareth Hughes; Ernest Hilliard
- Cinematography: Charles J. Davis
- Production company: Krelbar Pictures
- Distributed by: Collwyn Pictures Corporation
- Release date: October 29, 1927
- Running time: 7 reels
- Country: United States
- Language: Silent (English intertitles)

Broadway After Midnight, also known as Gangsters on Broadway, is a 1927 American silent crime melodrama film directed by Fred Windemere and written by Frederic Bartel and Adele Buffington. The film stars Matthew Betz, Priscilla Bonner, Cullen Landis, Gareth Hughes, and Ernest Hilliard. The film was released on October 29, 1927 by Krelbar Pictures.

== Cast ==
- Matthew Betz as Quill Burke
- Priscilla Bonner as Queenie Morgan / Gloria Livingston
- Cullen Landis as Jimmy Crestmore
- Gareth Hughes as Billy Morgan
- Ernest Hilliard as Bodo Lambert
- Barbara Tennant
- William H. Turner
- Hank Mann
- Paul Weigel

== Preservation ==
The film is now considered lost.
