= Tessie (film) =

1925 film

- Directed by: Dallas M. Fitzgerald
- Written by: Sewell Ford
- Starring: May McAvoy; Robert Agnew; Lee Moran
- Cinematography: Merritt B. Gerstad
- Production company: Arrow Film Corporation
- Distributed by: Arrow Film Corporation
- Release date: September 18, 1925
- Running time: 70 minutes
- Country: United States
- Language: Silent (English intertitles)

Tessie is a lost 1925 American silent comedy drama film directed by Dallas M. Fitzgerald and starring May McAvoy, Robert Agnew, and Lee Moran.

== Plot ==
As described in a film magazine review, a young woman who works as a cigar counter clerk in a hotel is abandoned by her sweetheart when he graduates from a mechanic's job to a sales position. She accepts the attentions of a rich youth in a spirit of revenge directed toward her former suitor. The youth thrashes the ex-mechanic and elopes with the young woman, who is well enough pleased with the outcome of her two romances.

== Cast ==
- May McAvoy as Tessie
- Robert Agnew as Roddy Wells
- Lee Moran as Barney Taylor
- Myrtle Stedman as Mrs. Wells
- Gertrude Short as Mame McQuire
- Mary Gordon as Aunt Maggie
- Walter Perry as Uncle Dan

== Preservation ==
With no holdings located in archives, Tessie is considered a lost film.

== Bibliography ==
- Munden, Kenneth White. The American Film Institute Catalog of Motion Pictures Produced in the United States, Part 1. University of California Press, 1997.
