= White Mice (film) =

1926 film

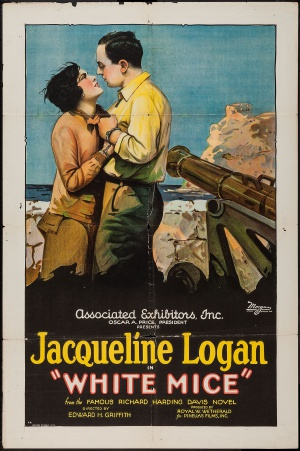
- Theatrical poster
- Directed by: Edward H. Griffith
- Written by: Randolph Bartlett
- Based on: White Mice by Richard Harding Davis
- Produced by: Royal W. Wetherald
- Starring: Jacqueline Logan; William Powell; Ernest Hilliard
- Cinematography: Marcel Le Picard
- Production company: Pinellas Films
- Distributed by: Associated Exhibitors
- Release date: January 31, 1926
- Running time: 6 reels
- Country: United States
- Language: Silent (English intertitles)

White Mice is a 1926 American silent drama film filmed in color with the Kelley Color Process (Wilson-Wetherald Color Process). It was directed by Edward H. Griffith and starring Jacqueline Logan, William Powell, and Ernest Hilliard. It is based upon the novel of the same name by Richard Harding Davis.

== Plot ==
As described in a film magazine review, Roddy Forrester and Peter de Peyster form the White Mice club for the purpose of aiding humans in distress. When Roddy's father sends him to South America, Peter accompanies him. In the Republic of Montebello, Roddy learns that General Rojas, a former president, is slowly dying in a prison cell. He decides to free the general, especially so when he meets Inez, the beautiful daughter of Rojas. Roddy succeeds in his efforts and wins the affections of Inez.

== Cast ==
- Jacqueline Logan as Inez Rojas
- William Powell as Roddy Forrester
- Ernest Hilliard as Colonel Vega
- Bigelow Cooper as R.B. Forrester
- Lucius Henderson as General Rojas
- Marie Burke as Senora Rojas
- Harlan Knight as MacKildrick
- Reginald Sheffield as Peter de Peyster
- F. Vaux Wilson as Dr. Vicenti
- William Wadsworth as Sylvanus Codman
- Dick Lee as Manuel (credited as Richard Lee)
- George De Richelevie as El Comandante
- Vivian Vernon as La Borrachita

== Production ==
White Mice was filmed entirely in Cuba, and includes shots of Havana and its Morro Castle.

== Bibliography ==
- Goble, Alan. The Complete Index to Literary Sources in Film. Walter de Gruyter, 1999.
