= The Big Hop =

1928 film

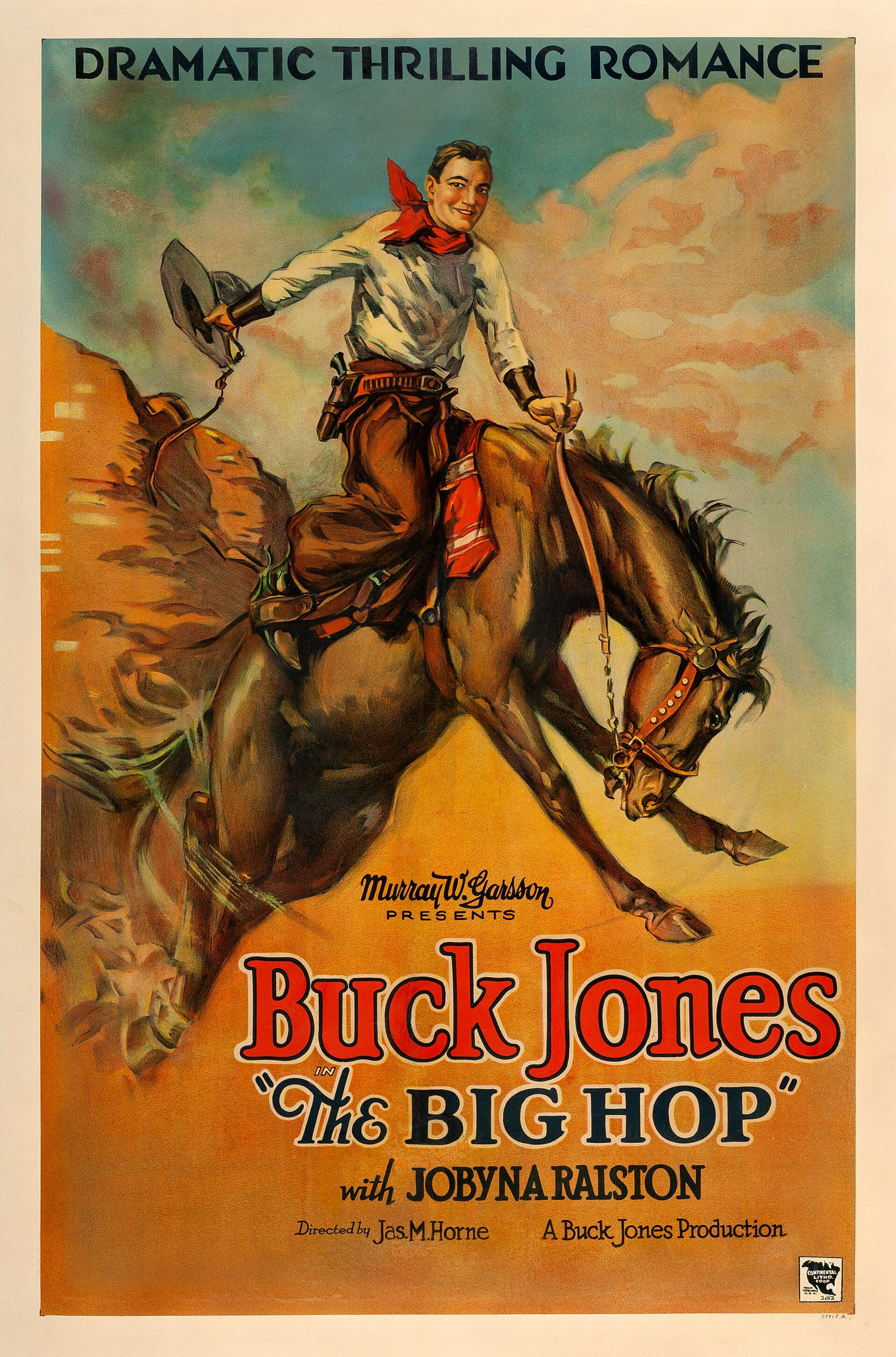
- Directed by: James W. Horne
- Written by: J.B. Mack; Donn McElwaine
- Produced by: Murray W. Garsson; Buck Jones
- Starring: Buck Jones; Jobyna Ralston; Ernest Hilliard
- Cinematography: Allen G. Siegler
- Edited by: Donn McElwaine
- Production company: Buck Jones Productions
- Release date: August 31, 1928
- Running time: 65 minutes
- Country: United States
- Languages: Silent; English intertitles

The Big Hop is a 1928 American silent Western film directed by James W. Horne and starring Buck Jones, Jobyna Ralston and Ernest Hilliard.

== Synopsis ==
A ranch hand takes up aviation and participates in an air race to Honolulu. He faces off against a villainous rival for the woman he loves.

== Cast ==
- Buck Jones as Buck Bronson
- Jobyna Ralston as June Halloway
- Ernest Hilliard as Ben Barnett
- Charles K. French as Buck Bronson's Father
- Charles Clary as June Halloway's Father
- Duke R. Lee as Ranch Foreman
- Edward Hearn as Pilot
- Jack Dill as Mechanic

== Bibliography ==
- Connelly, Robert B. The Silents: Silent Feature Films, 1910-36, Volume 40, Issue 2. December Press, 1998. ISBN 978-0-913204-36-8
- Munden, Kenneth White. The American Film Institute Catalog of Motion Pictures Produced in the United States, Part 1. University of California Press, 1997. ISBN 978-0-520-20969-5
