= Fleckenstein =

Fleckenstein may refer to:

- Château de Fleckenstein, an Alsatian castle
- Albrecht Fleckenstein (1917–1992), German pharmacologist and physiologist
- Bill Fleckenstein (1903–1967) American football player
- Franz Fleckenstein (1922–1996), German musical artist and priest
- Josef Fleckenstein (1919–2004) German historian and essayist
- Knut Fleckenstein (born 1953), German politician
- Kurt Fleckenstein (born 1949), German artist
- Sandra Fleckenstein (born 1985), German actress
