= Granddad (disambiguation) =

A grandad is a male grandparent.

Grandad or Granddad may also refer to:

- "Grandad" (song), a UK #1 song by Clive Dunn
- Grandad, a UK TV series (1979–1984) starring Clive Dunn as Charlie 'Grandad' Quick
- Grandad (Only Fools and Horses), a character in the British sitcom series
- Granddad, an Australian lungfish at the Shedd Aquarium in Chicago
- "Granddad" (Bluey), an episode of the Australian animated series Bluey
- Granddad (film), a 1913 American short film directed by Thomas H. Ince

== See also ==
- Grandpa (disambiguation)
- Old Grand-Dad, a bourbon whiskey
- 7 GRAND DAD, a bootleg of The Flintstones: The Rescue of Dino & Hoppy
