= Gramps (disambiguation) =

Gramps is an informal synonym for a male grandparent.

Gramp or Gramps, may also refer to:

== People ==
- Gramps, nickname of Guy Chouinard (born 1956), Canadian retired National Hockey League player
- Gramps, nickname of Tony Yates (born 1937), American retired college basketball player and coach
- Gramps Morgan, (born 1976), Jamaican reggae singer and musician
- Baby Gramps, American guitar performer famous for his palindromes
- Johann Gramp (1819–1903), Bavarian-born Australian winemaker and politician

=== Fictional characters ===
- George "Gramps" Miller, a character in the TV series Lassie
- Gramps, a character in advertisements for Cocoa Puffs
- Gramp, a fictional character from the film The Boy with Green Hair
- Gramp, a fictional character from the film Happy Land

== Other uses ==
- Gramps (software) (formerly GRAMPS, Genealogical Research and Analysis Management Programming System), genealogy software
- Gramps, a 1995 television movie starring Andy Griffith

== See also ==
- Gran (disambiguation)
- Grandpa (disambiguation)
