= Niebergall =

Niebergall is a surname and may refer to:

- Buschi Niebergall (1938–1990), German free jazz musician
- Charlie Niebergall (1899–1982), American Baseball player
- Ernst Elias Niebergall (1815–1843), German writer and playwright
- Julia Lee Niebergall (1886–1968), American musician and composer
