= Crooks Can't Win =

1928 film

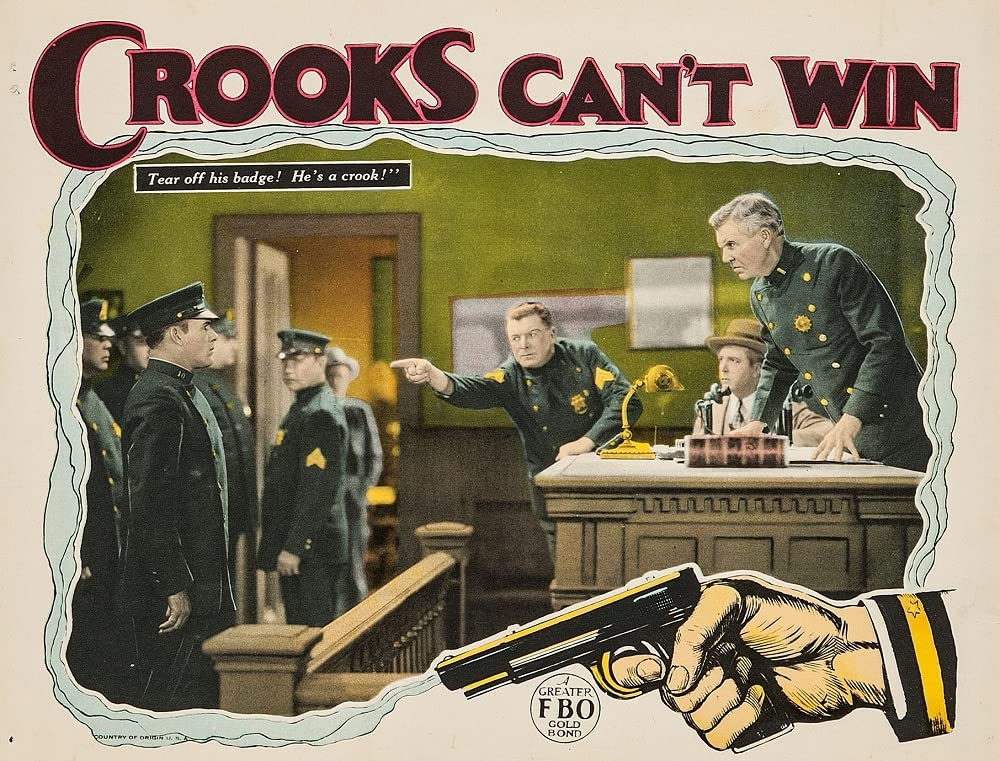
- Directed by: George M. Arthur
- Written by: Randolph Bartlett; Enid Hibbard; Joseph Jefferson O'Neil
- Starring: Ralph Lewis; Thelma Hill; Joe E. Brown
- Cinematography: Robert Martin
- Edited by: George M. Arthur
- Production company: Film Booking Offices of America
- Distributed by: Film Booking Offices of America; Ideal Films (UK)
- Release date: April 7, 1928
- Running time: 70 minutes
- Country: United States
- Languages: Silent; English intertitles

Crooks Can't Win is a 1928 American silent crime drama film directed by George M. Arthur and starring Ralph Lewis, Thelma Hill and Joe E. Brown.

== Synopsis ==
A police officer is kicked off the force when his superior wrongly believes that he is complicit in a robbery committed by a gang his brother is involved with. With the assistance of a crime reporter, he sets out to round up the gang of thieves and clear his name.

== Cast ==
- Ralph Lewis as Dad Gillen
- Thelma Hill as Mary Gillen
- Sam Nelson as Danny Malone
- Joe E. Brown as Jimmy Wells
- Eugene Strong as Alfred Dayton Jr
- Charlie Hall as 'Bull' Savage

== Bibliography ==
- Connelly, Robert B. The Silents: Silent Feature Films, 1910-36, Volume 40, Issue 2. December Press, 1998.
- Gehring, Wes D. Joe E. Brown: Film Comedian and Baseball Buffoon. McFarland, 2014.
- Munden, Kenneth White. The American Film Institute Catalog of Motion Pictures Produced in the United States, Part 1. University of California Press, 1997.
