= The Fair Co-Ed =

1927 film by Sam Wood

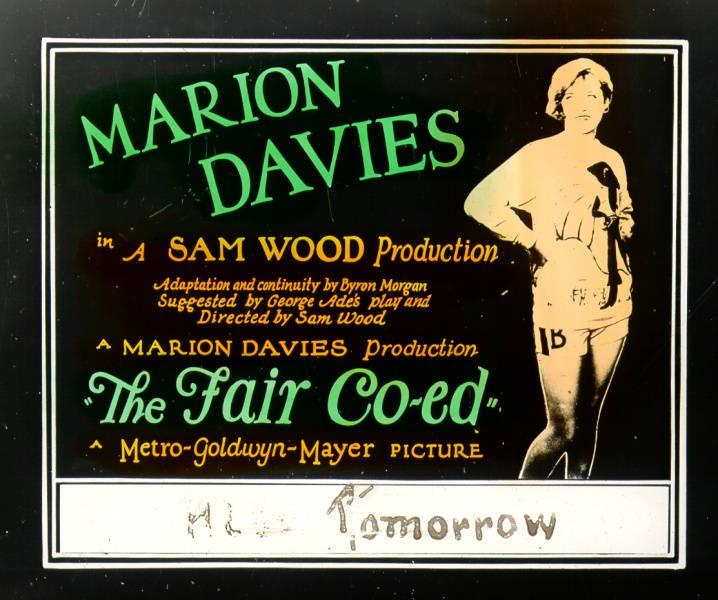
- Advertisement
- Directed by: Sam Wood
- Written by: Byron Morgan (scenario); Joseph Farnham (intertitles)
- Based on: The Fair Co-Ed by George Ade
- Produced by: Irving Thalberg; Sam Wood; William Randolph Hearst
- Starring: Marion Davies
- Cinematography: John Seitz
- Edited by: Conrad Nervig
- Production company: Cosmopolitan Productions
- Distributed by: Metro-Goldwyn-Mayer
- Release date: October 15, 1927
- Running time: 70 minutes (7 reels)
- Country: United States
- Languages: 1927 Silent Version; 1928 Sound Version (Synchronized) (English intertitles)
- Budget: $347,000

The Fair Co-Ed, also known as The Varsity Girl, is a 1927 American silent comedy film starring Marion Davies and released through MGM. The film was produced by William Randolph Hearst, through Cosmopolitan Productions and directed by Sam Wood. The film was released in a sound version in 1928 with a synchronized musical score with sound effects.

The film is based on a 1909 play/musical comedy The Fair Co-Ed by George Ade which starred a young Elsie Janis, and opened on Broadway on February 1, 1909.

The film survives today, supposedly in the MGM/UA archives, now controlled by Warner Brothers.

== Plot ==
The Fair Co-Ed (1927)

Marion Bright enrolls in college to pursue a handsome young man, Bob, only to discover that he is coach of the women's basketball team there. Marion joins the team and becomes its star player, but becomes unpopular when she refuses to play a game after a disagreement with Bob. Happily for all, she has a change of heart and returns in time to help the team win the big game.

== Cast ==
- Marion Davies as Marion Bright
- Johnny Mack Brown as Bob
- Jane Winton as Betty
- Thelma Hill as Rose
- Lillian Leighton as Housekeeper
- Gene Stone as Herbert
- James Bradbury, Sr. as uncredited
- Lou Costello as Extra
- Joel McCrea as Student
- Jacques Tourneur as Extra
- Lillian Copeland as basketball player

== Music ==
The sound version of this film featured a theme song entitled "The Fair Co-Ed" which was composed by William Axt and David Mendoza.

== Production ==
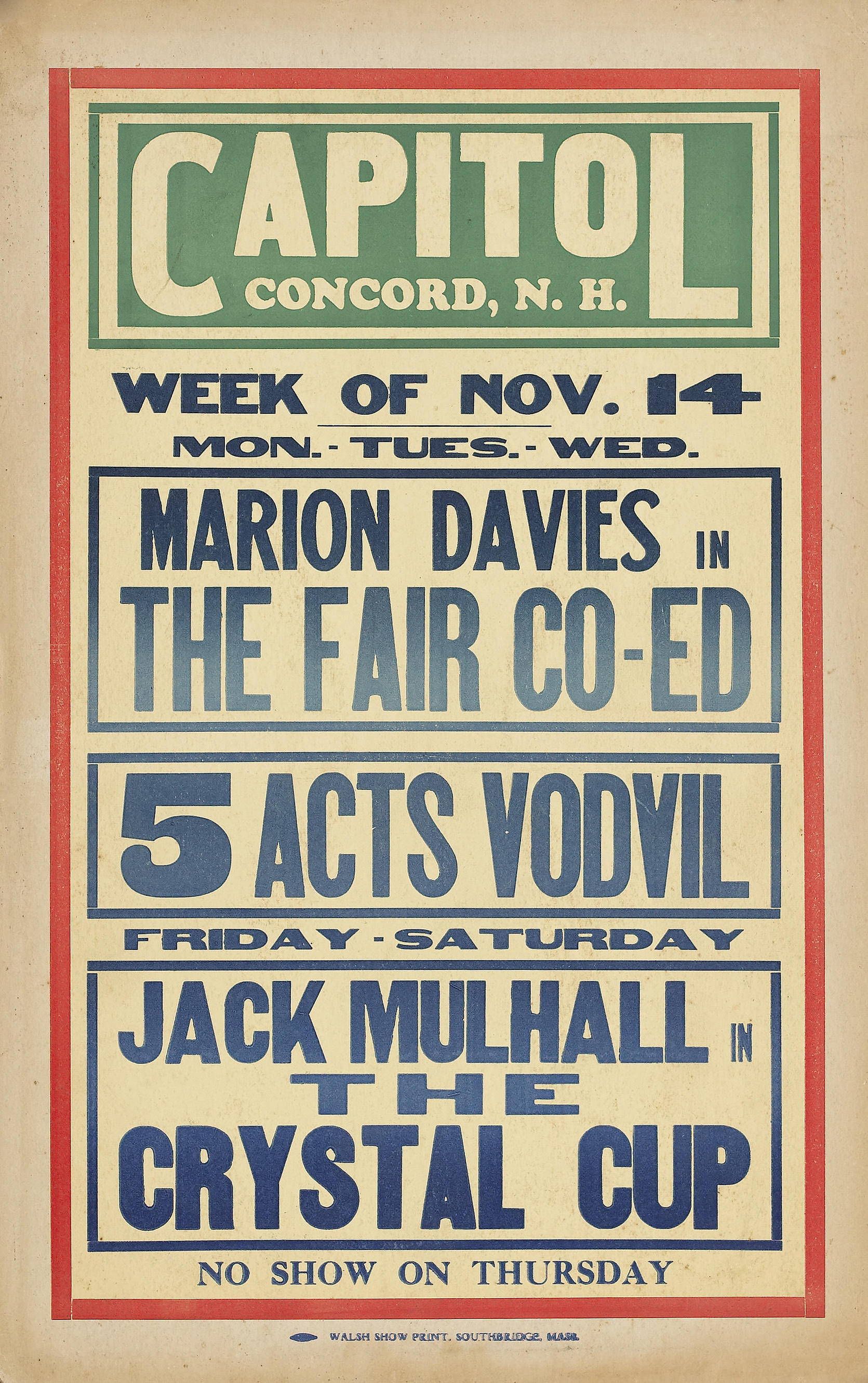
Poster advertising the film playing in Concord, New Hampshire

In her 25th film, Marion Davies starred as a madcap college student with a yen for the basketball coach Johnny Mack Brown. William Randolph Hearst always disliked this film and disliked director Sam Wood. Hearst always referred to this film as "that cheap-looking comedy" that went for "yap laughs". One of the highlights in the shooting of this film was when Charles Lindbergh visited the set. Davies was his favorite movie star. This was another box-office hit for Davies. The Fair Co-Ed was shot on location at Pomona College.

== Stills ==
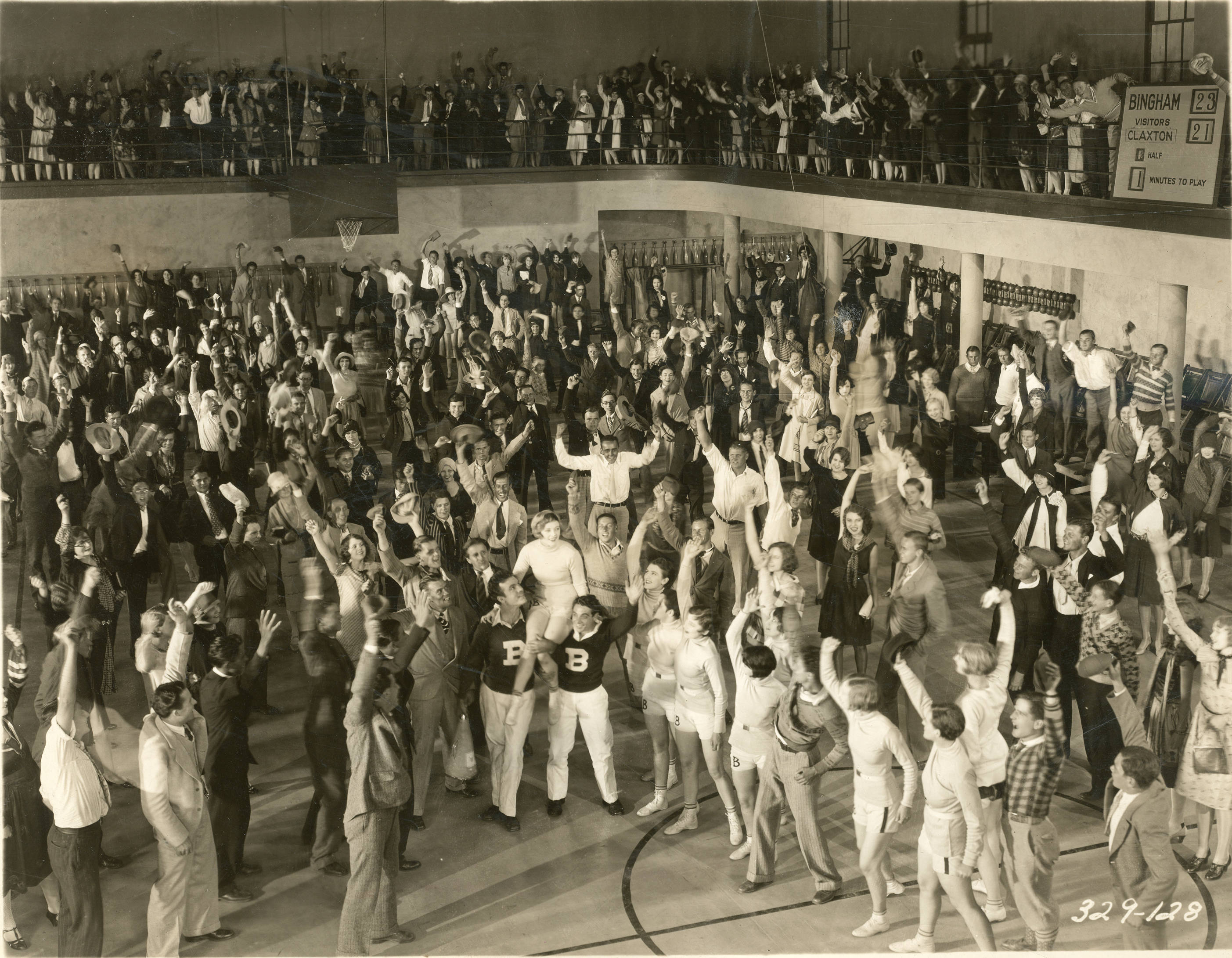
A production still of a college event in the film

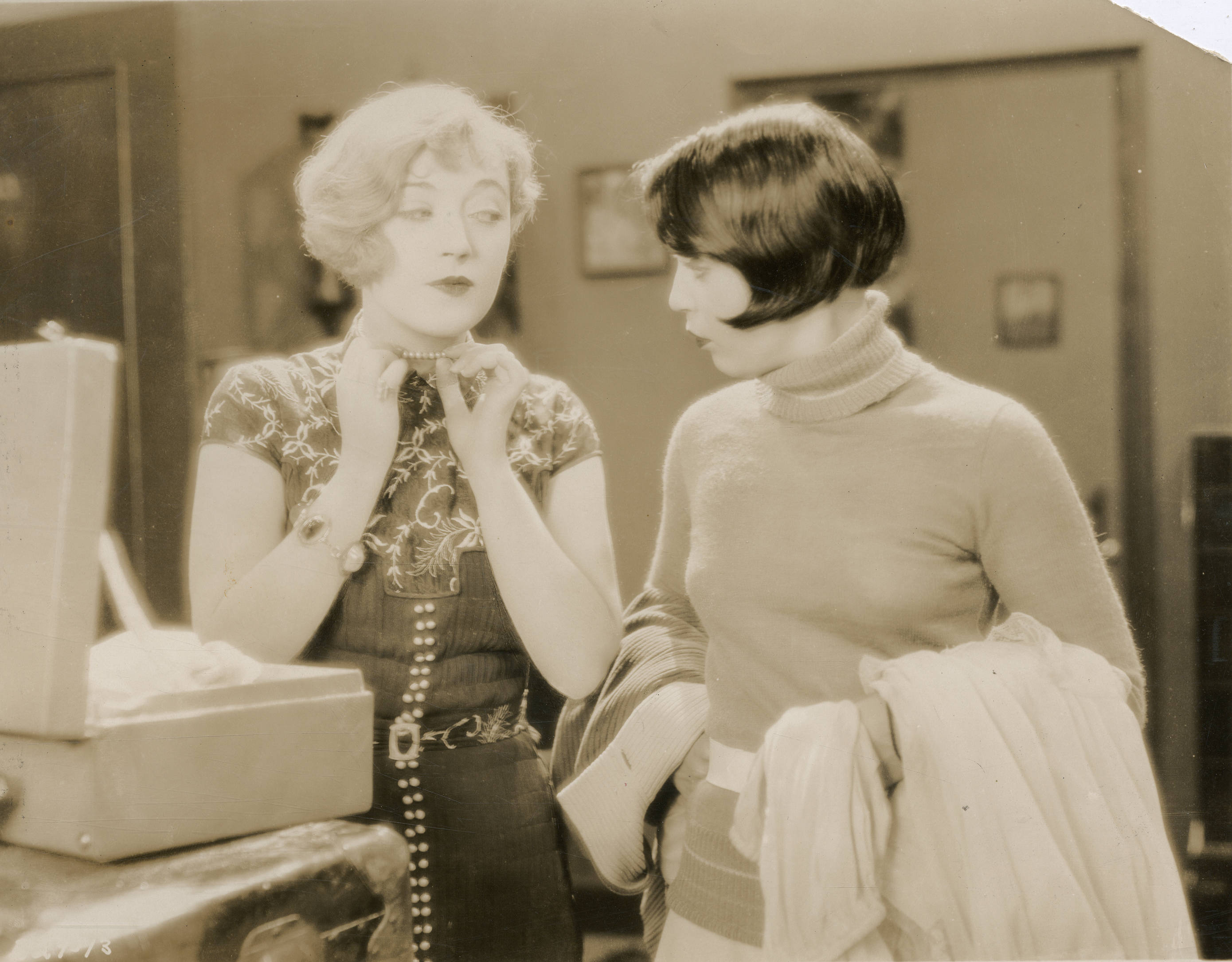
Production still of Marion Davies and Jane Winton

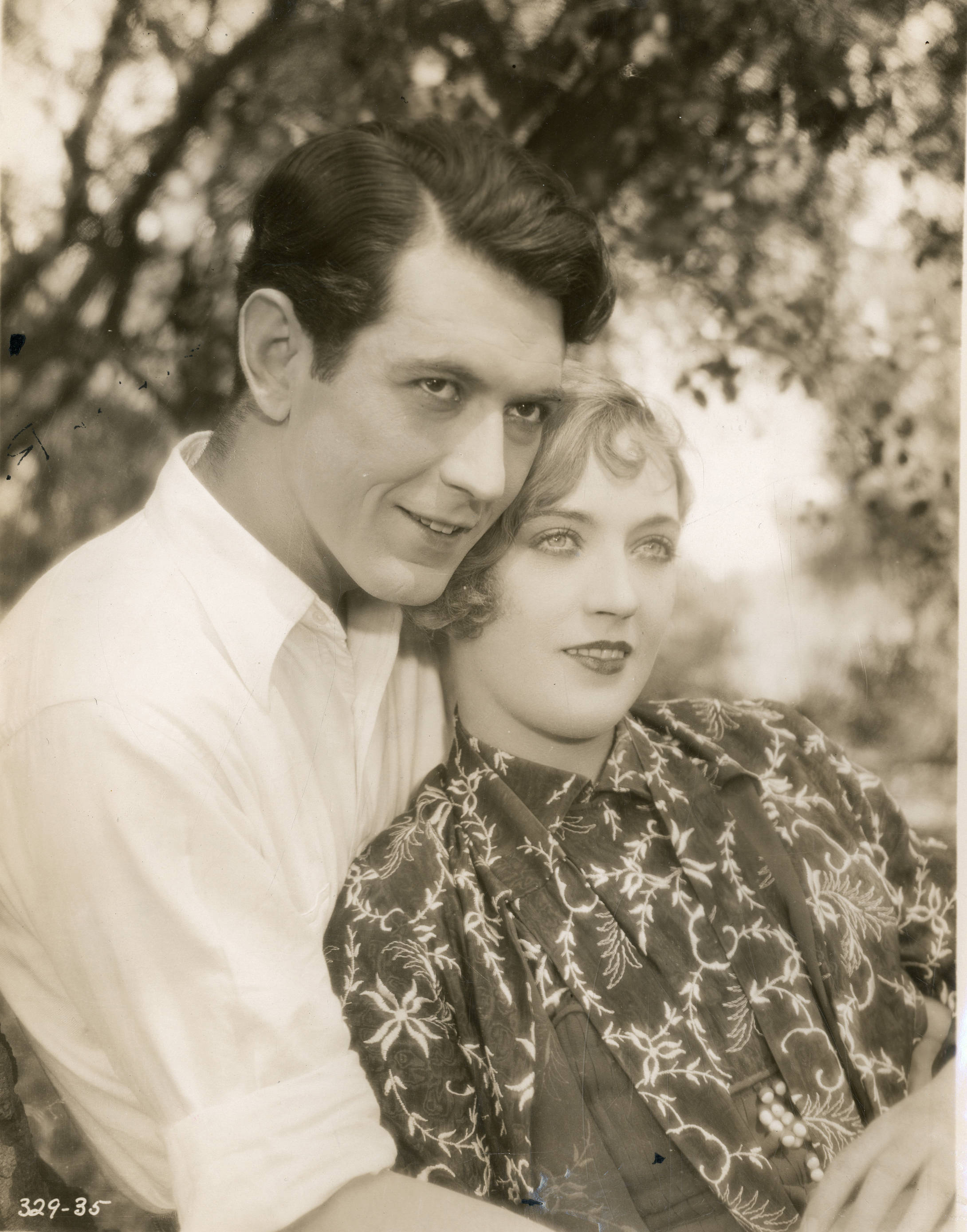
Production still of Johnny Mack Brown and Marion Davies

== See also ==
- List of basketball films
