= Sandra Fleckenstein =

German film and theatre actress

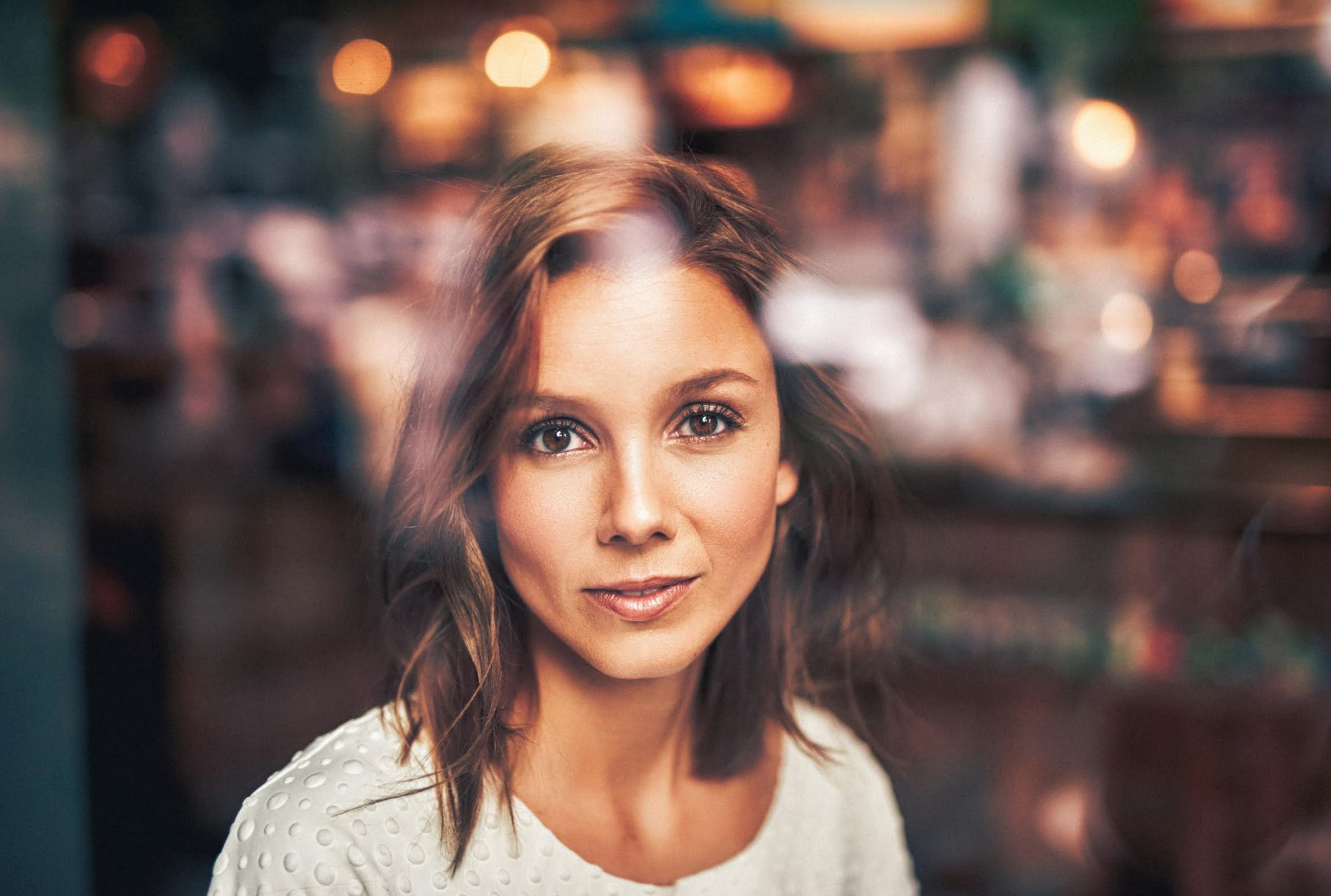
- Born: 17 October 1985 (age 40); Darmstadt, Hesse, Germany
- Occupation: Actress
- Years active: 2005–present
- Website: www.sandra-fleckenstein.de

Sandra Fleckenstein (born 17 October 1985 in Darmstadt, Germany) is a German film and theatre actress.

== Life ==
Fleckenstein was exposed to the world of acting and film from a young age. She had her first experience on a professional film set at the age of nine during the filming of the ZDF three-part movie Tödliche Wahl for German television. In later years, as Fleckenstein completed her final year of High School, she acted in the famous Hessian crime sequence Tatort. Subsequently, in 2007, Fleckenstein completed professional training to become a state-approved actress at the Film Acting School Cologne. Afterwards she studied at the Johannes Gutenberg University in Mainz graduating in 2015 with an M.A. in Film & Theatre Studies. She gave her first workshop in Acting for Camera in 2011 at the Darmstadt University of Applied Sciences. While further completing her education in acting by attending workshops with Hendrik Martz (Meisner Technique), Matthias Beier (Method Acting after Susan Batson) and Nick Dong-Sik.

Fleckenstein is characterized by her work across different media platforms. Along with media film/TV, theatre and advertisement, she works in other related fields. Since 2013, she has been working as a seminar actress for major companies throughout Germany. In January 2020, she began hosting the daily children's programme „Kiki, Timo, Gott & Du“ on the Christian television channel Hope TV, where she reads stories to children.

== Selected filmography ==
- Tatort: Leerstand (2005, TV film)
- Der Weg zum Urizon (2005)
- Our Charly (2009, TV film)
- Fairfield (2009)
- Erinnern ausgeschlossen (2009)
- Tridentität (2011)
- Alles Verbrecher – Eiskalte Liebe (2013, TV film)
- Encounters, Hope Channel (2015)
- The Vision (2017)
- Zweite Zukunft (2018)
- Silence (2019)
- Kiki, Timo, Gott & Du (2020)

== Theatre ==
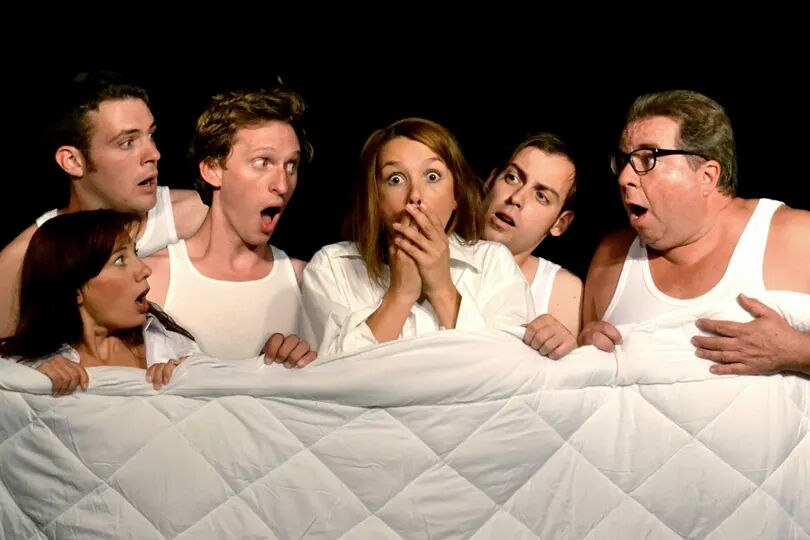
Sandra Fleckenstein (middle) with Simone Wagner and Kevin Silvergieter

- Things You Shouldn't Say Past Midnight (2014–2019), Theater Alte Brücke, Frankfurt
- The Rape of the Sabine Women (2016–2019), Büchner Bühne, Riedstadt
- Datterich (2017), Staatstheater Darmstadt
- The Outsiders of Uskoken Castle (2017-2018), Staatstheater Darmstadt
- Der Glasschrank (2020), Theater Lust Darmstadt

== Other commitments ==
In 2016 Fleckenstein began involvement with the aid organisation Seed of Small Beginnings, which provides sustainable support to families and communities in Cambodia. The focus is on two schools for which, among other things, school buildings are being built, teachers and teaching materials are being financed and drinking water is being provided. Fleckenstein has developed and taught the teaching concept ‘Free! to be me’, which promotes the children's self-confidence through singing, dancing and acting. In June 2019 Fleckenstein supported the opening of a kindergarten in the Cambodian jungle by the aid organisation.

Sandra Fleckenstein is a member of the acting union, Bundesverband Schauspiel, and has been a regional supervisor for Frankfurt since 1 January 2019.
