= The Windjammer =

1926 film

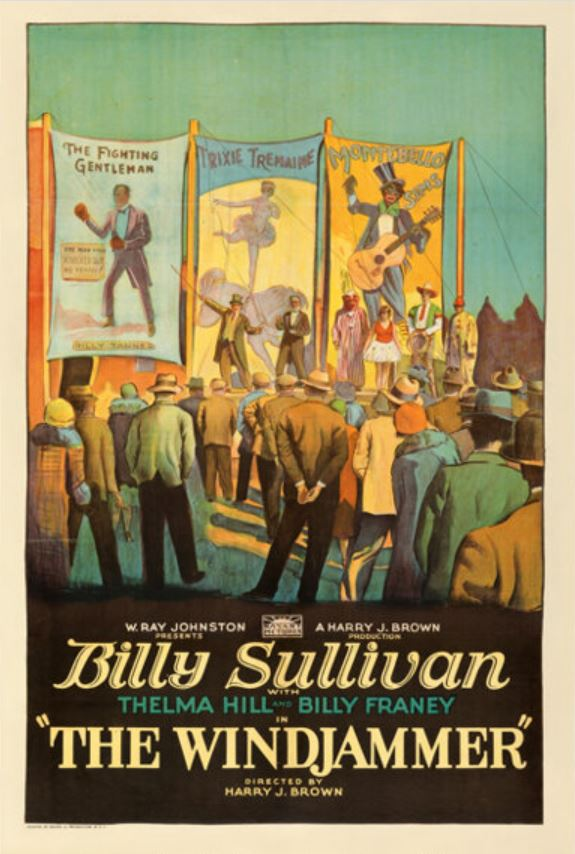
- Directed by: Harry Joe Brown
- Written by: Grover Jones
- Produced by: Harry Joe Brown; W. Ray Johnston
- Starring: Billy Sullivan; Thelma Hill; Billy Franey
- Production company: Harry J. Brown Productions
- Distributed by: Rayart Pictures
- Release date: June 10, 1926
- Running time: 50 minutes
- Country: United States
- Languages: Silent; English intertitles

The Windjammer is a 1926 American silent action film directed by Harry Joe Brown and starring Billy Sullivan, Thelma Hill and Billy Franey. It was distributed by the independent Rayart Pictures, the forerunner of Monogram Pictures.

== Synopsis ==
After graduating from college, Billy Tanner enters his family's old circus business. He becomes engaged in a running battle with a champion boxer who he is forced to fight.

== Cast ==
- Billy Sullivan as Billy Tanner
- Thelma Hill
- Billy Franey
- J.P. Lockney
- Robert Walker
- Fred Burns
- George Magrill
- Henry Roquemore
- Gypsy Clark

== Bibliography ==
- Munden, Kenneth White. The American Film Institute Catalog of Motion Pictures Produced in the United States, Part 1. University of California Press, 1997.
