= Grandpa (disambiguation) =

A grandpa is a male grandparent.

Grandpa, grampa, or granpa may also refer to:

== Places ==
- Tsiatsan or Grampa, a town in the Armavir Province of Armenia

== Music ==
- "Grand Pa", by Brymo from Merchants, Dealers & Slaves (2013)

== Titles or names in entertainment ==
- Grandpa, a character and Juni's grandfather in the Spy Kids franchise
- Granpa, an animated film starring Peter Ustinov and Sarah Brightman
- Grandpa (The Munsters), television series character
- Grandpa Brown, a character in the 1964 horror–science fiction movie The Creeping Terror
- Grampa Simpson, television series character, in The Simpsons
- Grandpa (Tell Me 'Bout the Good Ol' Days), song by The Judds
- Grandpa (comics), a comic strip that ran in British comic book magazine The Beano
- Grandpa, film character, from The Texas Chainsaw Massacre
- Grandpa, television series character, from Caillou
- Stanley "Grandpa" Kanisky, a character on the American television sitcom Gimme a Break
- "Grandpa", a 1955 short story by James H. Schmitz

== Nicknames ==
- Nickname of Alex Dickerson (born 1990), American baseball player

== See also ==
- Granddad (disambiguation)
