= Forbidden (1919 film) =

1919 film by Lois Weber, Phillips Smalley

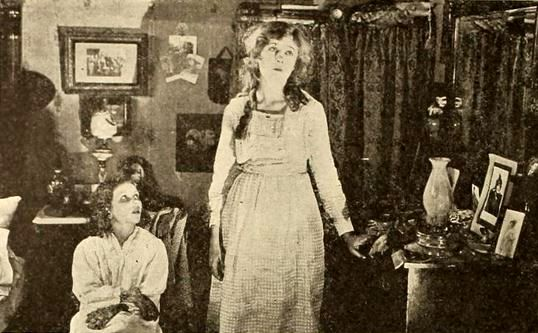
- Film still
- Directed by: Lois Weber; Phillips Smalley
- Written by: E.V. Durling (story); Lois Weber
- Produced by: Carl Laemmle
- Starring: Mildred Harris
- Cinematography: Roy Klafki; Dal Clawson
- Distributed by: Universal Film Manufacturing Company
- Release date: September 8, 1919
- Running time: 6 reels
- Country: United States
- Language: Silent (English intertitles)

Forbidden is a lost 1919 American silent drama film directed by Lois Weber and Phillips Smalley and starring Mildred Harris, who was billed as Mrs. Charles Chaplin. The picture was produced and distributed by the Universal Film Manufacturing Company.

The film was advertised as a Universal-Jewel production.

== Plot ==
As described in Exhibitors Herald, a film industry trade paper, Maddie Irwin (Harris), tired of living in the country, marries Fred Worthington (Henry Woodward), a childhood sweetheart long cherished as her idol but gone for five years to the city. After the wedding she learns that he has erected a sumptuous country home for them. Soon they become almost estranged by her desire to live in the city and his aversion to things metropolitan, born of a disappointment in love. He yields to her plea to take her to the city for a while at least. She learns to paint and powder, and his efforts to disgust her with that life fail. Then he pretends to leave her forever, having first arranged for a friend to take her to Chinatown. Here he, disguised, pretends to attempt an assault. A country acquaintance, who saw her and followed her, shoots him. She flees to her home in the country. Here her husband comes to her, keeping his plot secret, and happiness follows.

== Cast ==
- Mildred Harris as Maddie Irwin
- Henry Woodward as Fred Worthington
- Fred Goodwins as Ben Withers
- Priscilla Dean as An Adventuress
- Harry Woodward (uncredited)
