= Hearts of Men =

1928 film

- Directed by: James P. Hogan
- Written by: De Leon Anthony; Everett C. Maxwell
- Based on: Hearts of Men by James Oliver Curwood
- Produced by: Morris R. Schlank
- Starring: Mildred Harris; Thelma Hill; Warner Richmond
- Cinematography: Robert E. Cline
- Edited by: De Leon Anthony
- Production company: Morris R. Schlank Productions
- Distributed by: Anchor Film Distributors
- Release date: February 15, 1928
- Running time: 60 minutes
- Country: United States
- Languages: Silent; English intertitles

Hearts of Men is a 1928 American silent drama film directed by James P. Hogan and starring Mildred Harris, Thelma Hill and Warner Richmond.

== Cast ==
- Mildred Harris as Alice Weston
- Thelma Hill as Doris Weston
- Cornelius Keefe as John Gaunt
- Warner Richmond as William Starke
- Julia Swayne Gordon as Mrs. Robert Weston
- Harry McCoy as Tippy Ainsworth

== Bibliography ==
- Connelly, Robert B. The Silents: Silent Feature Films, 1910-36, Volume 40, Issue 2. December Press, 1998.
- Munden, Kenneth White. The American Film Institute Catalog of Motion Pictures Produced in the United States, Part 1. University of California Press, 1997.
