= Mildred Harris =

American actress (1901–1944)

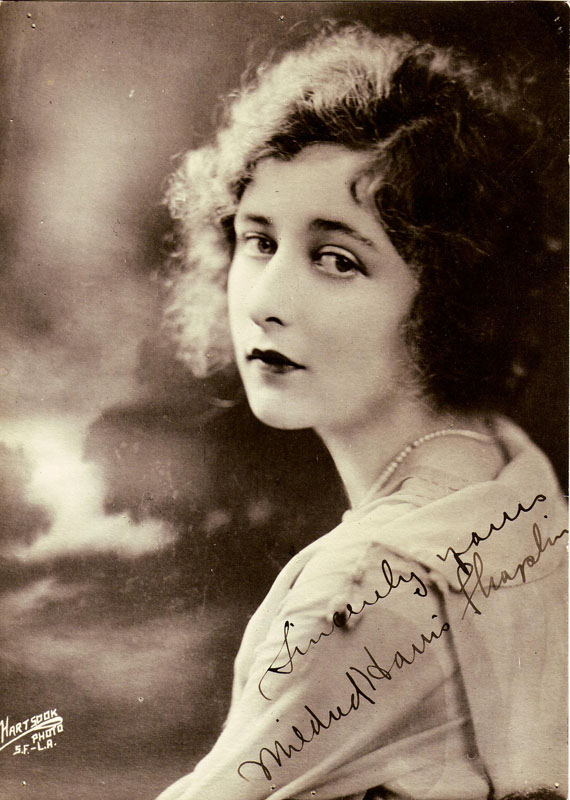
- Harris, c. 1919
- Born: November 29, 1901; Cheyenne, Wyoming, U.S.
- Died: July 20, 1944 (aged 42); Los Angeles, California, U.S.
- Occupation: Actress
- Years active: 1912–1944
- Spouses: Charlie Chaplin (m. 1918; div. 1920) Everett Terrence McGovern (m. 1924; div. 1929) Bill Fleckenstein (m. 1934)
- Children: 2

Mildred Harris (November 29, 1901 – July 20, 1944) was an American stage, film, and vaudeville actress during the early part of the 20th century. She began her career in the film industry as a child actress at age 10. She was also the first wife of Charlie Chaplin.

== Early life ==
Harris was born in Cheyenne, Wyoming, on November 29, 1901. Her parents were telegraph operator Harry Harris and Anna Parsons Foote. Harris made her first screen appearance at age 10 in the 1912 Francis Ford- and Thomas H. Ince-directed Western short The Post Telegrapher. She followed the film with various juvenile roles, often appearing opposite child actor Paul Willis. In 1914, she was hired by The Oz Film Manufacturing Company to portray Fluff in The Magic Cloak of Oz and Button-Bright in His Majesty, the Scarecrow of Oz. In 1916, at age 15, she appeared as a harem girl in Griffith's film Intolerance.

== Career ==
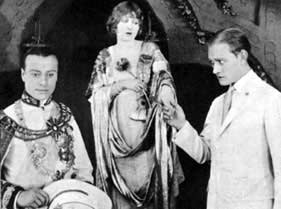
Harris in Fool's Paradise (1921) with John Davidson (left) and Conrad Nagel (right)

In the 1920s, Harris transitioned from child actress to leading roles with Conrad Nagel, Charley Chase, Milton Sills, Lionel Barrymore, Rod La Rocque and the Moore brothers, Owen and Tom. She appeared in Frank Capra's 1928 silent drama The Power of the Press with Douglas Fairbanks Jr. and Jobyna Ralston, and the same year, she starred in Universal Pictures' first sound film Melody of Love with Walter Pidgeon.

She found the transition to sound films difficult, and her career slowed dramatically. She performed in vaudeville and burlesque, and at one point, she toured with comedian Phil Silvers. She was critically praised for her performance in the 1930 film adaptation of the Broadway musical No, No Nanette. In the 1936 Three Stooges comedy Movie Maniacs, she portrayed a film starlet who is startled by Curly Howard when he strikes a match on the sole of her foot.

Harris continued to work in film in the early 1940s, largely through Cecil B. DeMille, who cast her in bit parts in 1942's Reap the Wild Wind (starring Paulette Goddard, who like Harris, was once married to Charlie Chaplin), and 1944's The Story of Dr. Wassell. Her last film appearance was in the posthumously released 1945 film Having a Wonderful Crime.

== Personal life ==
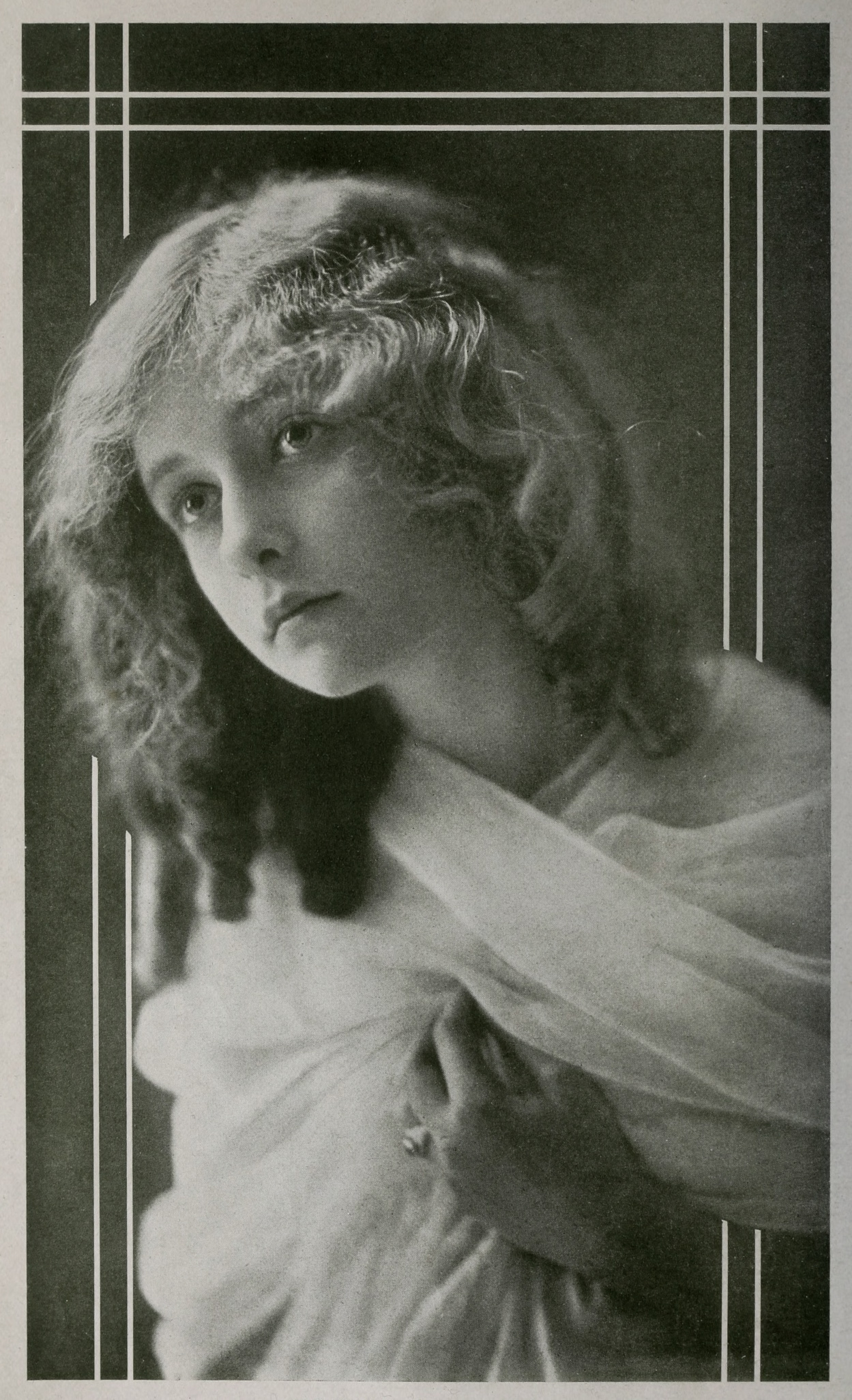
Mildred Harris, 1914 (age 13)

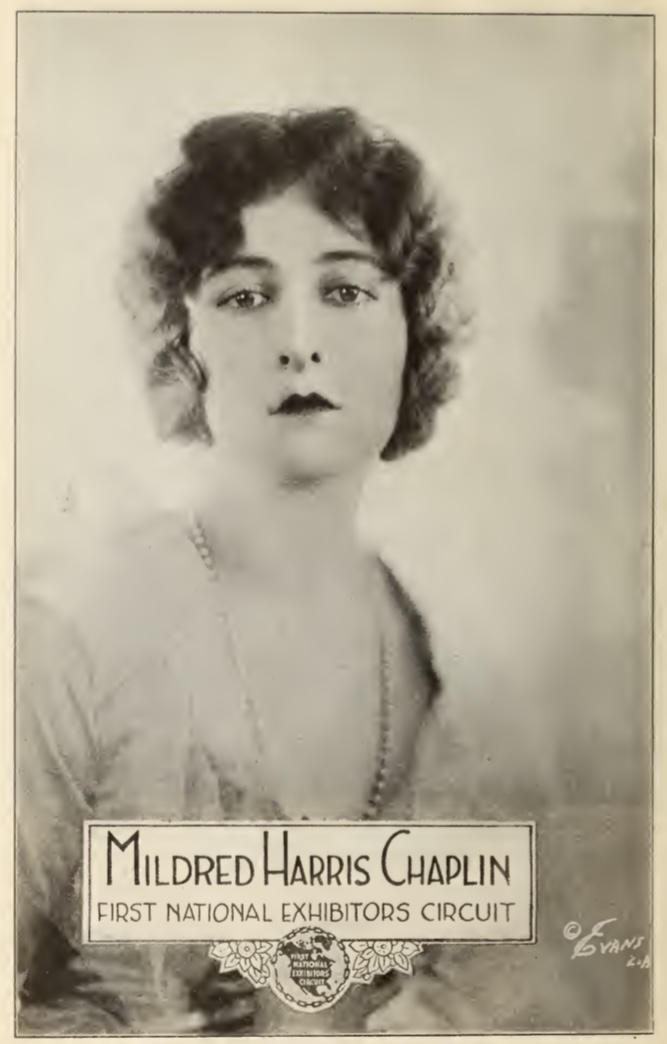
Mildred Harris Chaplin, 1920 (Motion Picture Studio Directory)

At age 16, Harris met and dated actor Charlie Chaplin in mid-1918, when he was 29. She thought she was pregnant by him, but the pregnancy was found to be a false alarm. They married privately on October 23, 1918, in Los Angeles. She later became pregnant. The couple quarreled about her contract with Louis B. Mayer and her career. Chaplin felt she was not his intellectual equal. Their child, Norman Spencer, died in July 1919, at age 3 days, and the couple separated in autumn 1919.

Chaplin moved to the Los Angeles Athletic Club. Harris believed a happy marriage was possible, but in 1920, she filed for divorce based on mental cruelty. Chaplin accused her of infidelity, and although he would not name her lover publicly, actress Alla Nazimova was suspected. The divorce was granted in November 1920, with Harris receiving $100,000 (Note: equivalent to $1.18 million in 2024) in settlement and some community property.

In 1924, Harris married Everett Terrence McGovern. The union lasted until November 26, 1929, when Harris filed for divorce in Los Angeles on the grounds of desertion. The couple had one son, Everett Terrence McGovern, Jr. (1925 - 2014). In 1934, she married former football player William P. Fleckenstein in Asheville, North Carolina. Fleckenstein owned a musical show in which he and Harris were performing at the time of their marriage.

== Death ==
Harris and Fleckenstein remained married until Harris's death on July 20, 1944, of pneumonia, following a major abdominal operation. She had been ill for three weeks. She is interred in the Abbey of the Psalms Mausoleum at the Hollywood Forever Cemetery in Los Angeles.

== Legacy ==
In 1960, a star on the Hollywood Walk of Fame was posthumously dedicated to Harris. It is located at 6307 Hollywood Boulevard in Los Angeles, California. Harris was played by actress Milla Jovovich in the 1992 biographical film Chaplin.

== Filmography ==
Year	Film	Role	Notes
1912	The Post Telegrapher		
1912	The Triumph of Right	Their Little Daughter	
1912	His Nemesis		
1912	The Frontier Child	A Frontier Child	
1912	His Squaw		
1912	His Sense of Duty		
1913	A Shadow of the Past		
1913	The Wheels of Destiny		
1913	The Miser		
1913	The Drummer of the 8th		
1913	A Child of War		
1913	A True Believer		
1913	The Seal of Silence		
1913	Granddad	Mildred	Survives
1913	Borrowed Gold		
1914	Romance of Sunshine Alley		
1914	O Mimi San		
1914	The Courtship of O San		
1914	Wolves of the Underworld		
1914	The Colonel's Orderly		
1914	The Social Ghost	Ethel	
1914	Shadows of the Past		
1914	A Frontier Mother		
1914	The Sheriff of Bisbee		
1914	Shorty and the Fortune Teller		
1914	When America Was Young		
1914	Mildred's Doll	Mildred	
1914	The Magic Cloak of Oz	Princess Margaret 'Fluff' of Noland	
1914	His Majesty, the Scarecrow of Oz	Button-Bright, who is lost and doesn't care	
1914	Jimmy	Mary	
1915	The Lone Cowboy		
1915	The Warrens of Virginia	Betty Warren	
1915	Enoch Arden	A Child	uncredited
1915	The Little Matchmaker	Mildred	
1915	The Little Soldier Man	Mildred	
1915	The Absentee	Innocence	Lost
1915	A Rightful Theft		
1915	The Old Batch	First Adopted Daughter	
1915	The Choir Boys		
1915	The Little Lumberjack		
1915	The Indian Trapper's Vindication	Dorothy King - their Daughter	
1916	Hoodoo Ann	Goldie	Survives; Library of Congress
1916	Intolerance	Favorite of the Harem	uncredited, Survives; many
1916	The Old Folks at Home	Marjorie	Unsure if it exists. LoC online database says 'No'. silentera.com says 'Yes'
1916	The Matrimaniac		uncredited, Survives; Library of Congress, others
1916	The Americano	Stenographer	Survives; Library of Congress, others
1917	The Bad Boy	Mary	Lost
1917	A Love Sublime	Eurydice	Lost
1917	An Old Fashioned Young Man		Lost
1917	Time Locks and Diamonds	Lolita Mendoza	Lost
1917	Golden Rule Kate	Olive - Kate's sister	Survives; Library of Congress, Academy Film Archive (possible abridgement)
1917	The Cold Deck	Alice Leigh	print Incomplete; Library of Congress, La Cinemathèque française
1917	The Price of a Good Time	Linnie	Lost
1918	The Doctor and the Woman	Sidney Page	Lost
1918	Cupid by Proxy	Jane Stewart	print Survives; Archives du Film CNC Bois d'Arcy, France
1918	For Husbands Only	Toni Wilde	Lost
1918	Borrowed Clothes	Mary Kirk	Lost
1919	When a Girl Loves	Bess	Lost
1919	Home	Millicent Rankin	Lost
1919	Forbidden	'Maddie' Irvin	Lost
1920	Old Dad	Daphne Bretton	Lost
1920	The Inferior Sex	Allisa Randall	Lost (as Mildred Harris Chaplin)
1920	Polly of the Storm Country	Polly	Lost (as Mildred Harris Chaplin)
1920	The Woman in His House	Hilda	Lost (as Mildred Harris Chaplin)
1921	Habit	Irene Fletcher	Lost
1921	A Prince There Was	Katherine Woods	Lost
1921	Fool's Paradise	Rosa Duchene	Survives; Library of Congress
1922	The First Woman	The Girl	Lost
1923	The Fog	Madelaine Theddon	Lost
1923	The Daring Years	Susie LaMotte	Lost
1924	The Shadow of the East	Gillian Locke	Lost
1924	By Divine Right	The Girl	Lost
1924	Traffic in Hearts	Alice Hamilton	Lost
1924	One Law for the Woman	Polly Barnes	print Survives; private holding (abridgement)
1924	In Fast Company	Barbara Belden	print Survives; Filmmuseum Amsterdam (EYE Institut)
1924	Unmarried Wives	Princess Sonya	print Survives; Filmoteca Espanola (Madrid)
1924	Stepping Lively	Evelyn Pendroy, the girl	Survives
1924	The Desert Hawk	Marie Nicholls	Lost
1925	Easy Money	Blanche Amory	Survives; Library of Congress
1925	Flaming Love	Chita	Lost
1925	Beyond the Border	Molly Smith	Survives
1925	The Dressmaker from Paris	Joan McGregor	Lost (per Lost Film Files)
1925	Super Speed	Claire Knight	Survives; Library of Congress
1925	Private Affairs	Amy Lufkin	Lost
1925	My Neighbor's Wife	Inventor's Wife	Lost
1925	A Man of Iron	Claire Bowdoin	Lost
1925	The Fighting Cub	Margie Toler	Incomplete; print held at UCLA, one reel missing
1925	The Unknown Lover	Gale Norman	Lost
1925	Soiled	Pet Darling	Lost
1926	Mama Behave	Lolita Chase, Charlie's Wife	Short, Survives
1926	The Isle of Retribution	Lenore Hardenworth	Lost
1926	The Self Starter	Ruth Atkin	Lost
1926	Dangerous Traffic	Helen Leonard	Survives
1926	The Wolf Hunters	Helen Ainsworth	Lost
1926	The Mystery Club	Mrs. Kate Vandeerveer	Lost (per Lost Film Files: Universal Pictures)
1926	Cruise of the Jasper B	Agatha Fairhaven	Survives; Library of Congress
1927	The Show Girl	Maizie Udell	Survives; Library of Congress, UCLA Film and Television
1927	One Hour of Love	Gwen	Survives; National Archives of Canada
1927	Husband Hunters	Cynthia Kane	Survives; BFI London
1927	Wandering Girls	Maxine	Survives; La Corse Et Le Cinéma
1927	Wolves of the Air	Marceline Manning	Survives
1927	Burning Gold	Claire Owens	Lost
1927	She's My Baby	Claire Daltour	Lost
1927	Rose of the Bowery		Lost
1927	The Swell-Head	Kitty	Lost (per Lost Film Files: Columbia Pictures)
1927	The Girl from Rio	Helen Graham	Survives; Library of Congress
1927	Out of the Past	Dora Prentiss	Lost
1927	The Adventurous Soul	Miriam Martin	Survives; Library of Congress
1928	The Last Lap		Lost
1928	Hearts of Men	Alice Weston	Lost
1928	The Heart of a Follies Girl	Florine	Lost
1928	Lingerie	Mary	print Survives; BFI London
1928	The Speed Classic	Sheila Van Hauten	Lost
1928	Melody of Love	Madelon	Unsure; LoC says yes...silentera.com says no
1928	The Power of the Press	Marie Weston	Survives
1929	Side Street	Bunny	Survives
1929	Sea Fury	The Girl	Lost
1930	No, No, Nanette	Betty	
1930	The Melody Man	Martha	
1930	Ranch House Blues		
1935	Lady Tubbs	Society Woman	uncredited
1935	The quiero con locura		
1935	Never Too Late	Mary Lloyd Hartley	
1936	Movie Maniacs	Leading Lady	
1936	Great Guy	bit role	uncredited
1942	Reap the Wild Wind	Dancing Lady	uncredited
1942	Holiday Inn	Woman	uncredited unconfirmed
1943	Sweet Rosie O'Grady	Minor role	uncredited
1944	The Story of Dr. Wassell	Dutch nurse	uncredited
1944	Fun Time	Tillie	uncredited
1944	Hail the Conquering Hero	Wife of Marine Colonel	uncredited
1945	Having Wonderful Crime	Guest	uncredited
