= The Power of the Press =

1928 film

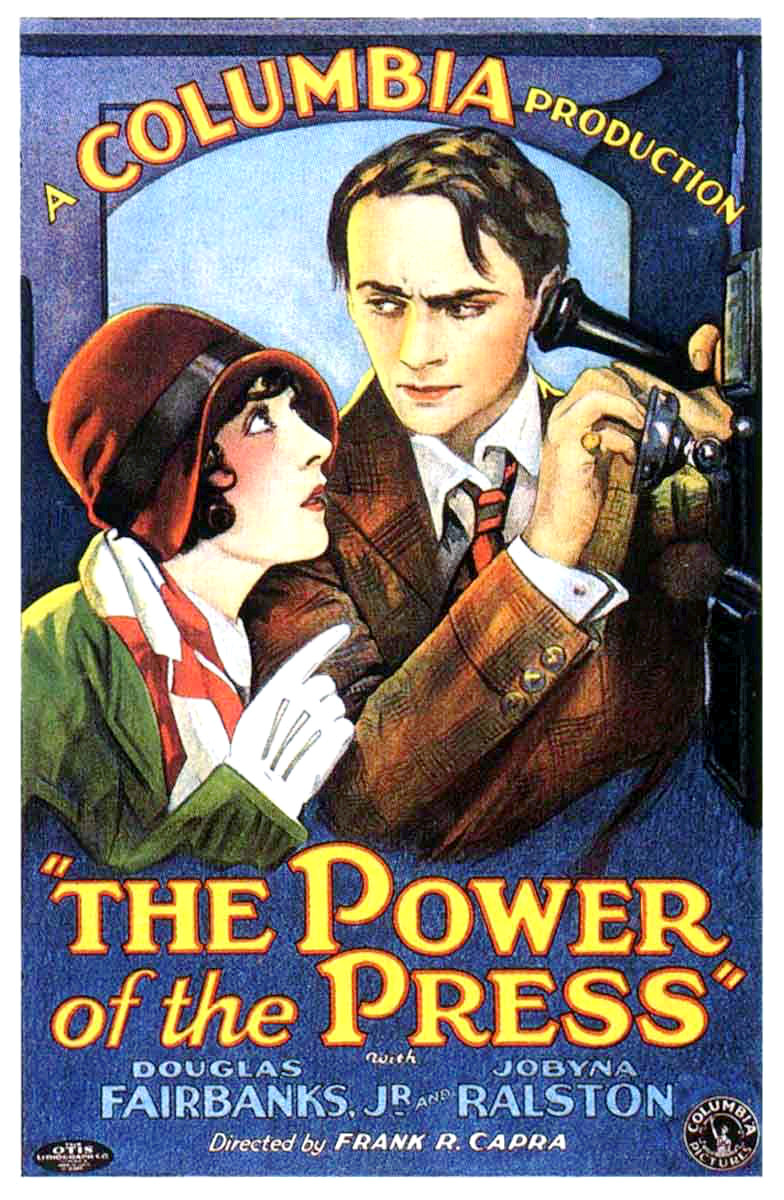
- Theatrical poster
- Directed by: Frank Capra
- Written by: Sonya Levien; Frederick A. Thompson
- Produced by: Jack Cohn
- Starring: Douglas Fairbanks Jr. Jobyna Ralston; Mildred Harris; Philo McCullough; Wheeler Oakman
- Cinematography: Chester A. Lyons; Ted Tetzlaff
- Edited by: Arthur Roberts
- Distributed by: Columbia Pictures
- Release date: October 31, 1928 (U.S.)
- Running time: 62 minutes
- Country: United States
- Language: Silent (English intertitles)

The Power of the Press is a 1928 American silent drama film directed by Frank Capra and starring Douglas Fairbanks Jr. as an aspiring newspaper reporter and Jobyna Ralston as a young woman suspected of murder.

In 1943, Columbia Pictures reused the title, without the leading The, for another newspaper picture, but it had a completely different plot and was not a remake.

== Cast ==
- Douglas Fairbanks Jr. as Clem Rogers
- Jobyna Ralston as Jane Atwill
- Mildred Harris as Marie Weston
- Philo McCullough as Robert Blake
- Wheeler Oakman as Van
- Robert Edeson as City Editor
- Edward Davis as Mr. John Atwill
- Dell Henderson as Bill Johnson
- Charles Clary as District Attorney Nye
- Spottiswoode Aitken as Sports Writer
- Frank Manning as Detective

== Preservation ==
In 2005 the film was selected for preservation in the United States National Film Registry by the Library of Congress as being "culturally, historically, or aesthetically significant".
