= Thelma Hill =

American actress (1906–1938)

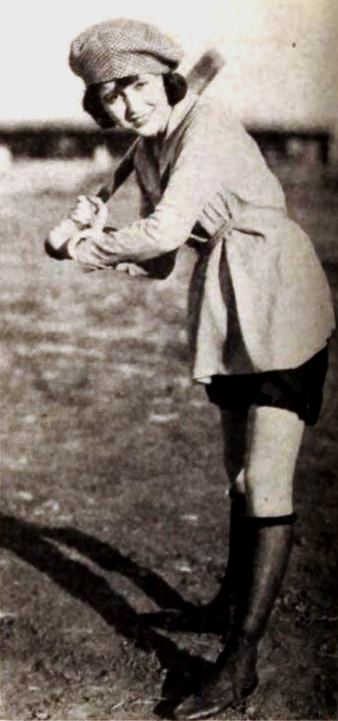
- From a 1920 magazine
- Born: Thelma Hillerman; December 12, 1906; Emporia, Kansas, U.S.
- Died: May 11, 1938 (aged 31); Culver City, California, U.S.
- Resting place: Forest Lawn Memorial Park
- Occupations: Actress, Model
- Years active: 1919–1934
- Spouse: John West Sinclair (m. 1934)

Thelma Hill (born Thelma Hillerman; December 12, 1906 – May 11, 1938) was an American silent screen comedian and one of the Sennett Bathing Beauties.

== Early life ==
Hill was born Thelma Hillerman on December 12, 1906, in Emporia, Kansas. Her parents were married in Salt Lake City, Utah in 1899. They relocated to Emporia, Kansas, before Thelma was born and divorced when she was a baby. Her mother Augusta "Gussie" Hillerman was given full custody after alleging her father, railroad worker Clifford Hillerman, had abandoned them for another woman. Clifford Hillerman died in 1914 after suffering an accident at work.

== Career ==
Before she became a Mack Sennett bathing beauty, Hill worked as an artist's model in New York.

Hill was one of the few Sennett Bathing Beauties to make it into featured roles. Hill was widely known as the "mah jongg bathing girl" because of the mah jongg bathing suit she was photographed in.

When she was a child her parents divorced and her father died. Thelma and her mother moved to California, where they opened a cafe down the road from the Sennett studios. She was discovered by Roscoe Fatty Arbuckle when she was serving him and dropped soup in his lap. Arbuckle introduced her to Mack Sennett who made her one of his bathing beauties. In a 1924 article Sennett declared she was the "ideal bathing beauty of her time". The petite actress was just five feet tall and weighed only 100 pounds.

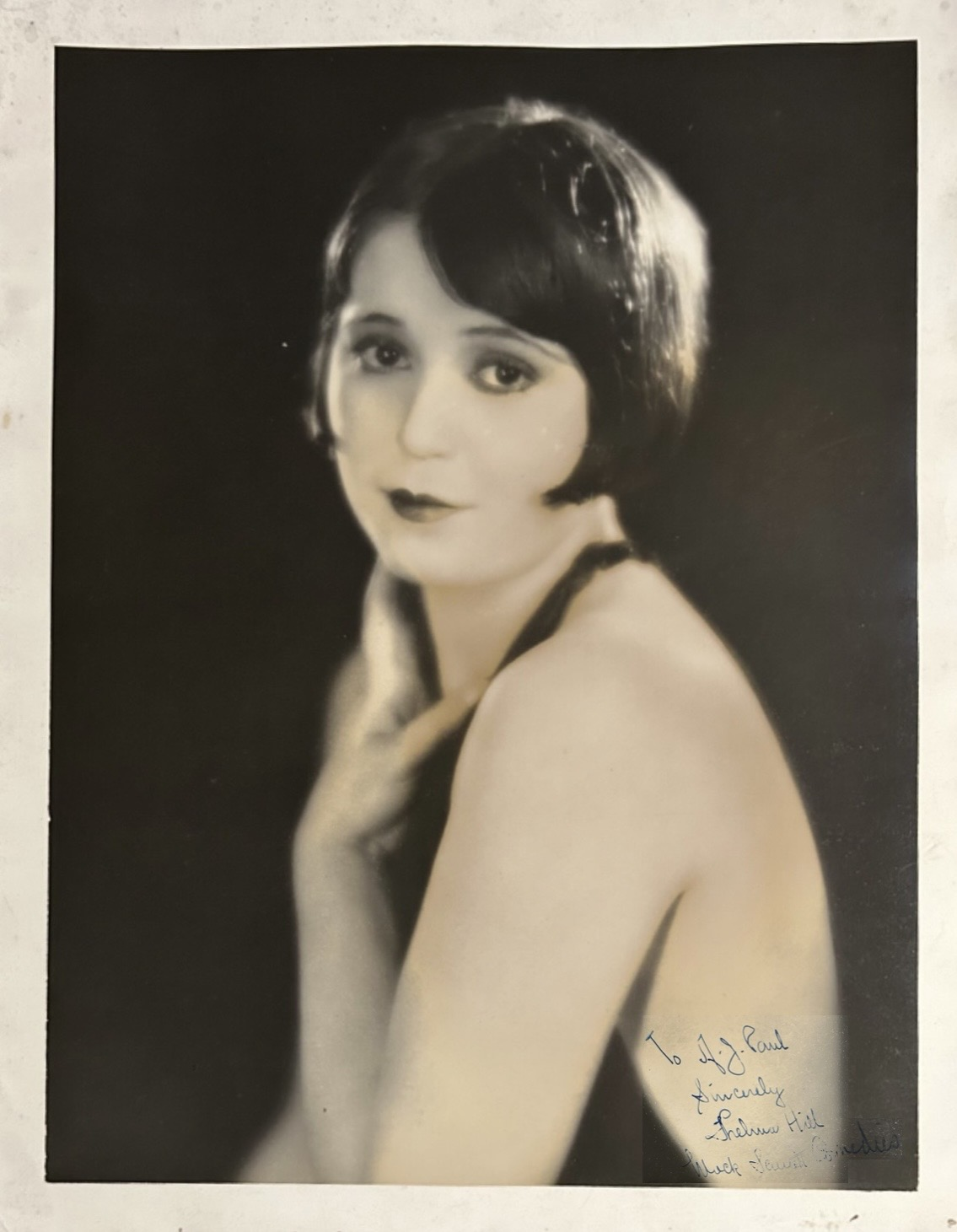
Sennett Publicity Photo

She started working as an extra at the Sennett studios in 1919 and appeared in dozens of comedy shorts including Picking Peaches (1924) and The Hollywood Kid (1925). She was a talented comedienne and quickly moved on to featured roles. Hill starred opposite Ben Turpin in A Prodigal Bridegroom (1926) and with Billy Bevan in Hoboken From Hollywood. Mack Sennett saw her potential and signed to her a long term long contract.

From 1927 to 1929, she co-starred with Bud Duncan in Larry Darmour's series of silent Toots and Casper comedy shorts and was Laurel and Hardy's leading lady in Two Tars (1928). She was under contract at FBO in 1927 and was signed by MGM for a role in The Fair Co-Ed (1927). She appeared in a handful of talkies including The Old Barn (1929) and The Naughty Flirt (1931) with Alice White. Her final role was in the Hal Roach comedy Mixed Nuts (1934).

== Personal life ==
In 1934 she married John West Sinclair, a stunt man and gag writer for W.C. Fields.

== Death ==
By 1935 she had retired from movies and was living with her husband at 8229 Blackburn Avenue in Hollywood. Unfortunately she was suffering from depression and alcohol abuse. After having a nervous breakdown she entered Edward Merrill Sanitarium in Culver City, California, in early 1938.

She died at the sanitorium on May 11, 1938, at the age of 31. Cause of death was attributed to a stomach ailment. She was buried in Forest Lawn Memorial Park

== Partial filmography ==
- Up In Alf's Place (1919)
- Picking Peaches (1924)
- The Hollywood Kid (1924)
- Pie-Eyed (1925)
- Hoboken To Hollywood (1926)
- The Divorce Dodger (1926)
- The Windjammer (1926)
- Flirty Four-Flushers (1926)
- Fooling Casper (1927)
- His First Flame (1927)
- Crazy To Act (1927)
- The Pride Of Pikeville (1927)
- The Fair Co-Ed (1927)
- The Chorus Kid (1928) *lost film
- Two Tars (1928)
- Crooks Can't Win (1928)
- Hearts of Men (1928)
- The Old Barn (1929)
- Two Plus Fours (1930)
- The Miracle Woman (1931)
- The Naughty Flirt (1931)
- The Dentist (1932)
- Wild People (1932)
- Mixed Nuts (1934)
