= Kurt Fleckenstein =

German sculptor

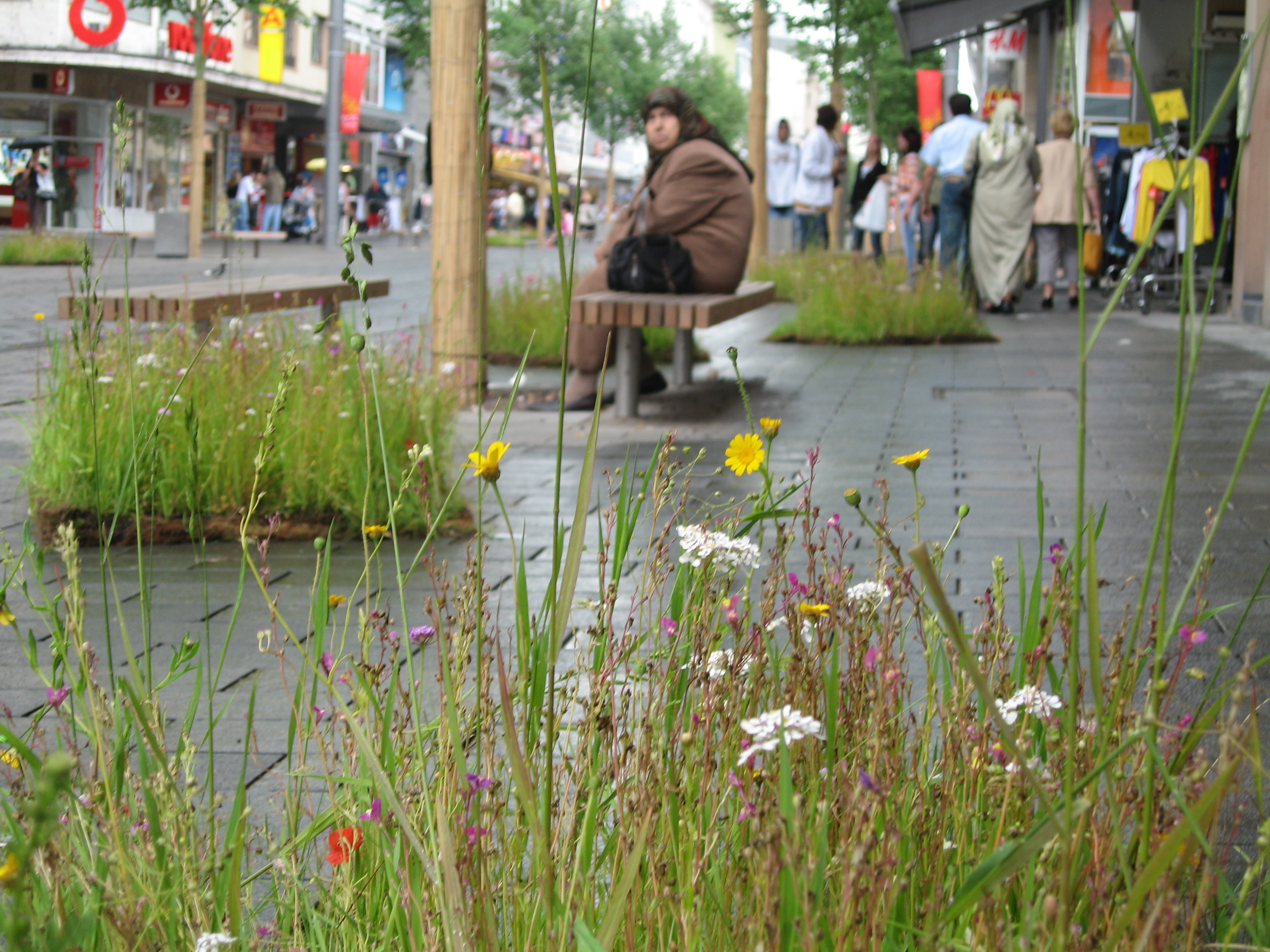
Field Flowers – to commemorate the 400th anniversary of Mannheim, Germany

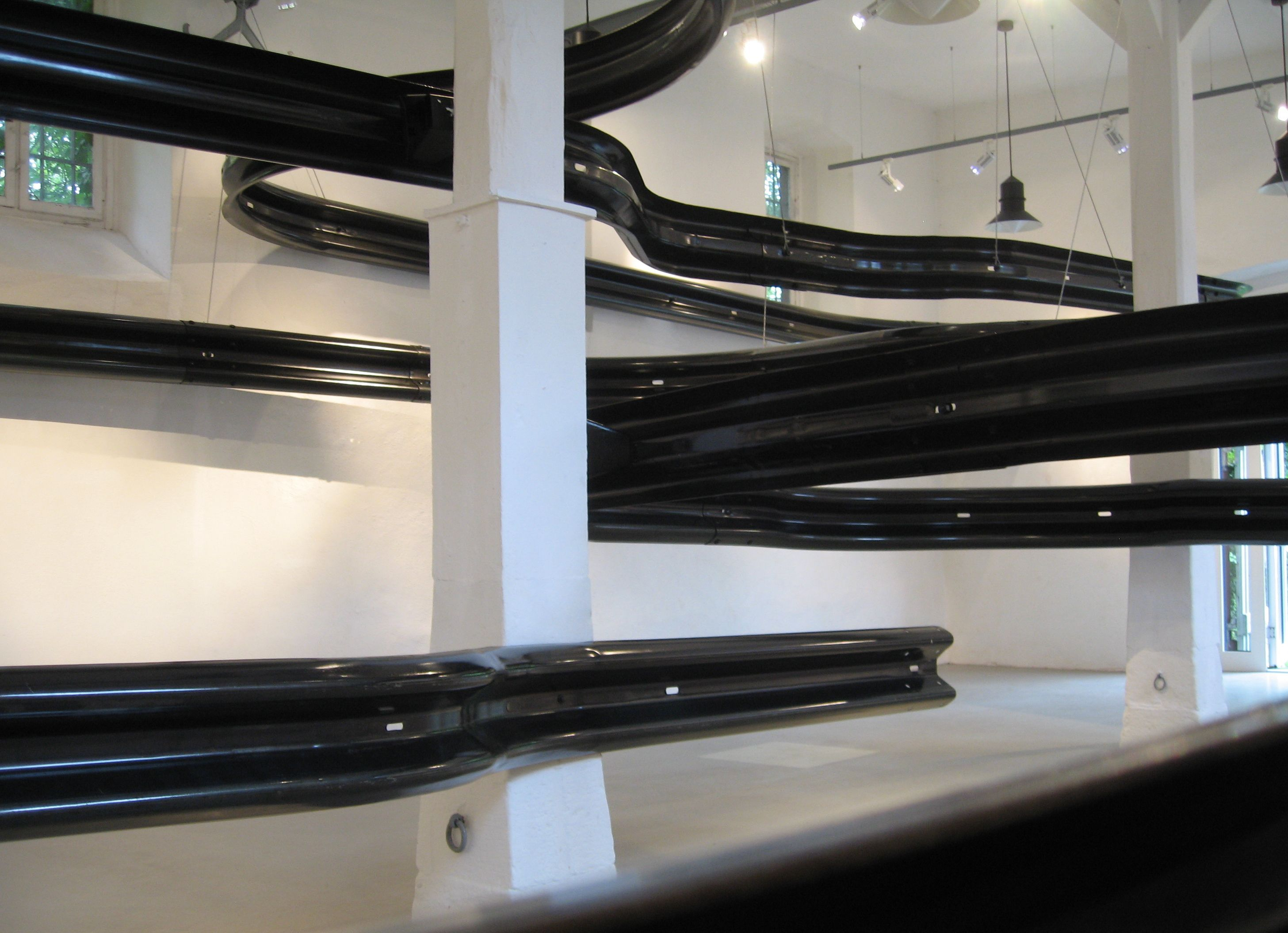
Last Exit - Art Association Neckar Odenwald

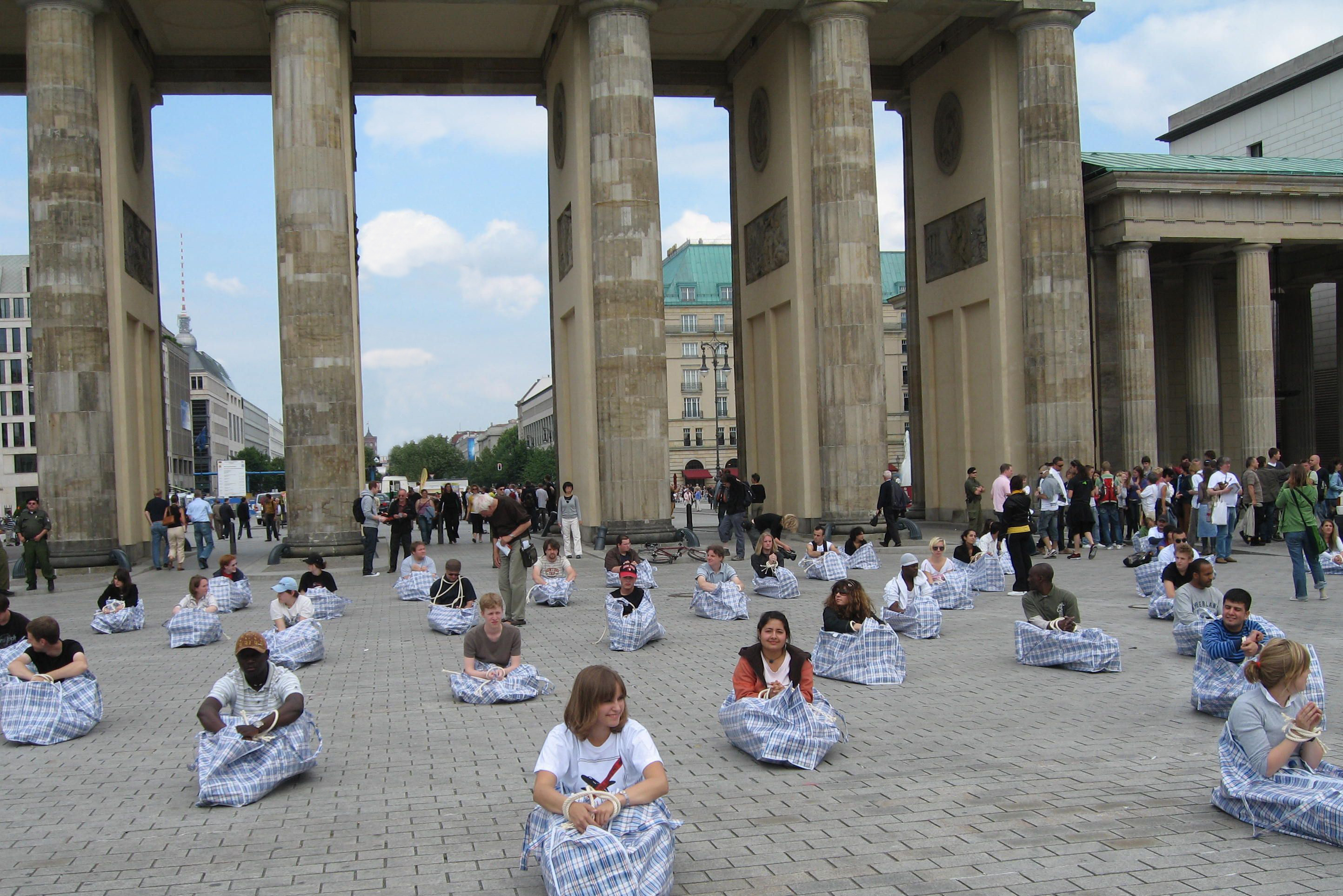
Cleared - at the Brandenburg Gate Berlin – status of asylum seekers in Germany

Kurt Fleckenstein (born December 5, 1949) is a German artist/sculptor associated with land art, minimal art and installation art. Fleckenstein was born in Heddesheim near Mannheim in Baden-Württemberg. His earlier career in landscape architecture, regional planning and horticultural art led to the establishment of several architectural studios in Germany, Austria and Poland. Since 2003 he has worked as a freelance artist with a focus on spatial objects and installations in exhibition centres and public open space. His provocative art form is designed to charm, irritate and challenge the viewer to question and compare “idealism with realism” on major social, cultural, economic and environmental issues. Fleckenstein now divides his home and work life between Mannheim, Germany and Wroclaw, Poland.

== Studies ==
Kurt Fleckenstein initially completed a master's degree in landscape architecture with a special emphasis on art history at the University of Applied Science in Weihenstephan. Then followed regional planning studies at the University of Karlsruhe majoring in environmental space and landscape before completing a Doctorate in Political Science at the University of Kaiserslautern which enabled Fleckenstein to professionally link the science disciplines studied.

== Political activities ==
He was politically active in the eighties as a member of the Regional Planning Association – Lower Neckar, co-founded a local green party and was the Local member for the County Council of Rhein-Neckar district in Baden-Wurttemberg.

== Research and planning ==
As a recipient of research awards by the Federal Government and the University of Karlsruhe/Sparkasse Foundation in 1980/1981 Fleckenstein commenced a period of intense scientific activity culminating in over 80 publications in books and trade journals. His main field of research was the environmental impact of large-scale infrastructure projects on landscape planning. As a result of his research, many current planning practices have been adopted in the area of integrating infrastructure routes and mining ventures into the contemporary landscape. In the early 1990s as the borders of eastern Europe were opened he established offices at Dresden in the former East Germany and Wrocław in Poland. This strategic move created a point of departure for his future cross-border plans and research.

== Change towards visual arts ==
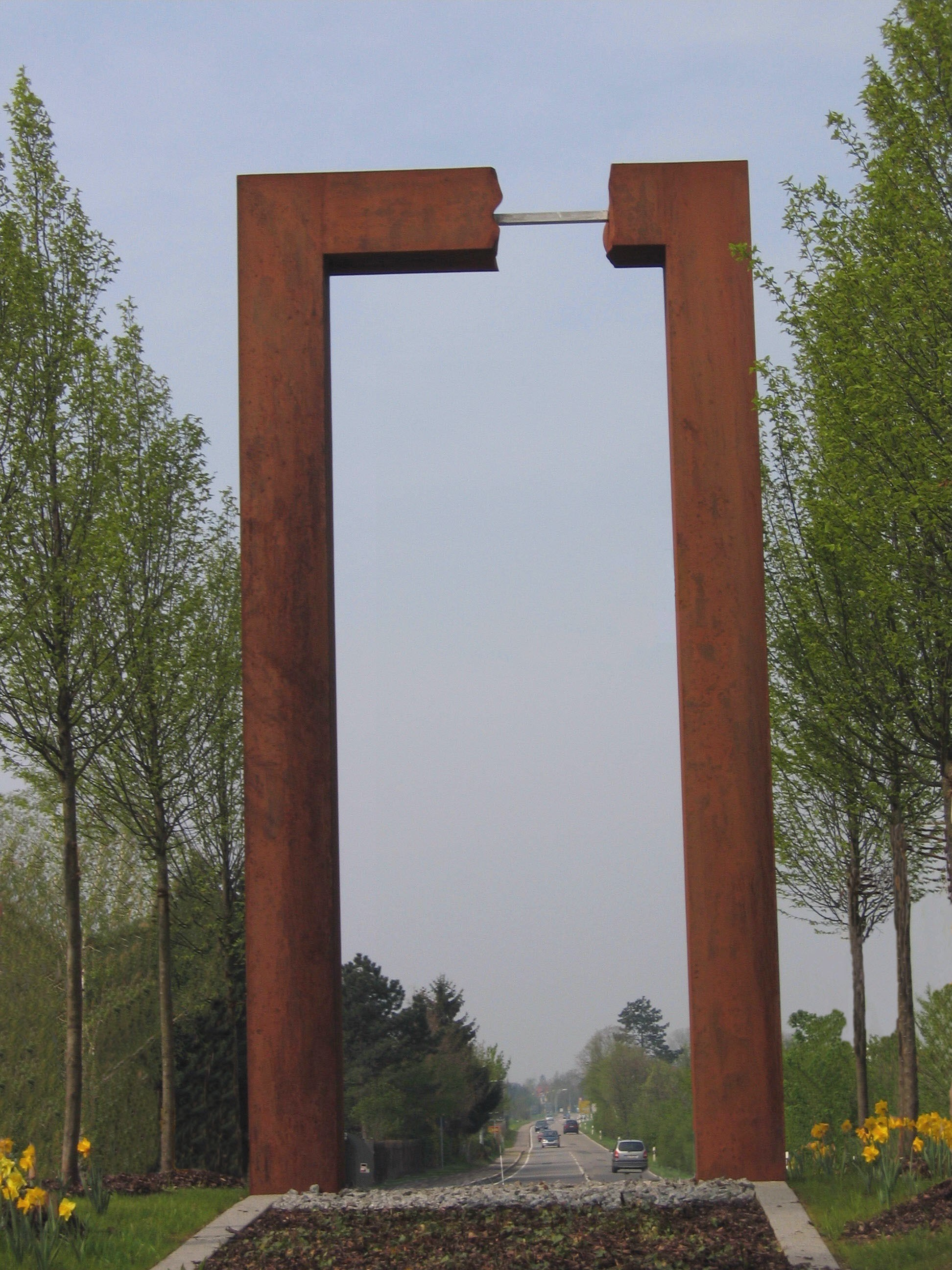
Entry Gate - Heddesheim

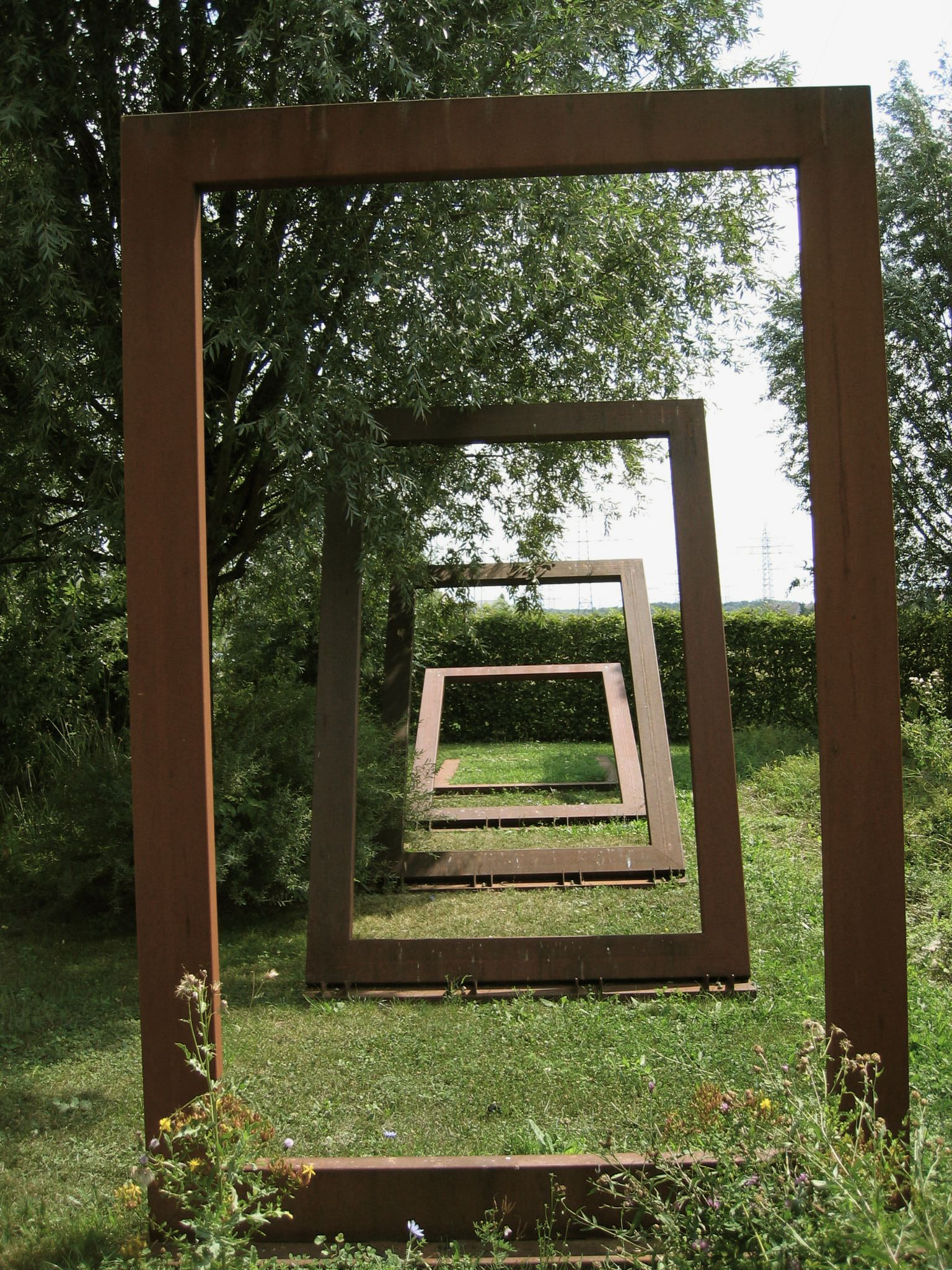
Falling Frame - Mannheim

From an outsiders' point of view Fleckensteins' career appeared to undergo a major transformation at the age of 50. He ceased his scientific/planning activities and handed over his planning company with offices in Germany/Poland/Austria dedicating all his energy to artistic work. If you take a closer look on his life however one would realise that the new direction in his work was not a “sea-change” as such. The landscape planning studies combined with a passion for the history of art and artistry were reflected in his large-scale commercial installations of that era i.e. minimalist emphasis - utilising polystyrene and the new industry technologies had already set the course. The complexities of the landscape issue would remain the prime focus and the consistent fight for a "contemporary landscape" were inspired by the wish to design spaces and regions according to artistic ideals.

== Land-art objects ==
Against the backdrop of his qualifications in the field of landscape, it does not surprise that land-art objects and installation represent an important part of the current works by Kurt Fleckenstein. His objects deal with the surrounding landscape or town-scape. Strong encounters of the monumental, rust coloured objects which are a contrast to the green landscape come into being and connect with nature. Playing with gravity is particularly distinct in his work - when balls threaten to roll down a hill or cubes are ready to tip - but do not fall down. In his art he refers to minimalist positions and thus finds new ways to deal with reduction, so that an artwork is a thing by its own existence. “ That is what it is, no more and no less - it does not symbolise anything, it is just present in the context of its surroundings”. An example is the town entrance gate of Wroclaw. A square measuring 8 by 8 meters defines the edge of town. At the same time the viewer establishes sight contact with the approaching town. The location and the context of the surroundings constitute the quality of the object. Other objects (photomontages) are located in almost untouched landscapes. In this examples the stress ratio between the geometry and pure nature in its spatial interaction is thematised.

== Installations ==
Consistent with his socio-critical life philosophy, Fleckenstein's geometric objects in the landform are supplemented by issue related installations. In those space-filling works, which one could associate with the Pop Art or Object Art, current media issues are dealt with in a critical and provocative way.

For example, in his installation art titled "Fitness"- barbells mutate into moving parts of a male body. In the “Chess - a Game of Kings" installation, the chessboard in the showroom consists of black and red squares filled with blood and petroleum. Fleckenstein also enjoys using industrial products in his installations in an alienated context in order to prompt awareness for the viewer. In his work "Last Exit" 100 meters of typical roadside crash barriers were integrated in the exhibition room in a curvilinear infinite loop. On the occasion of the 400th anniversary of the founding of Mannheim he arranged the installation “Field Flowers” 2 throughout the citycentre. 400 (1m x 1m) squares of plants and flowers seemed to be growing out of the city's paving and sidewalks. The squares appeared at random but were strategically placed amidst pedestrian traffic and impact in an endearing way. His “Whipped through Customs” installation at the Brandenburg Gate in Berlin is within the meaning of performance art. 100 adolescents sat gloomily inside typical carry bags used by immigrants with their hands tied. In this artistic way Feckelstein wanted to draw attention to the status of asylum seekers in Germany. The year 2009 was characterised by post-communist social changes in Russia and Ukraine. These events were thematised by Fleckenstein with a “Freedom” exhibition at the Museum of Non-Conformist Art in St. Petersburg and the “Homage to Sergei Eisenstein” exhibit on the Potomkein steps in Odesa. In 2011 a big solo exhibition took place in the "Museo d'Arte Contemporanea - Villa Croce" in Geneva. "Lost in View" was the title of the exhibition in which spatial illusions caused visitors to mistrust their own visual faculty.

Sociopolitically motivated installations and projects in public space get more and more important in his artistic practice. With installations in Ukraine and at the Museum Kulturspeicher he takes a stand for the struggle for freedom of the Ukrainian people. In a film displayed at the fassade of the WRO-Art Center in Wroclaw in 2012 - the year of the European Football Championship - he dealt with German history. The topic of the film were the crimes committed at Babyn Jar in Kyiv. These were artistically broached within a football game between naked players and players in a German tricot.

With his installation "I believe in God" in front of the Frauenkirche (Church of our Lady) in Dresden in 2015 he received nationwide attention. There, he displayed 75 prayer-rugs on the fore court of the church in order to stand-up against Pegida and to promote freedom and tolerance in Germany.

== Identification with Poland ==
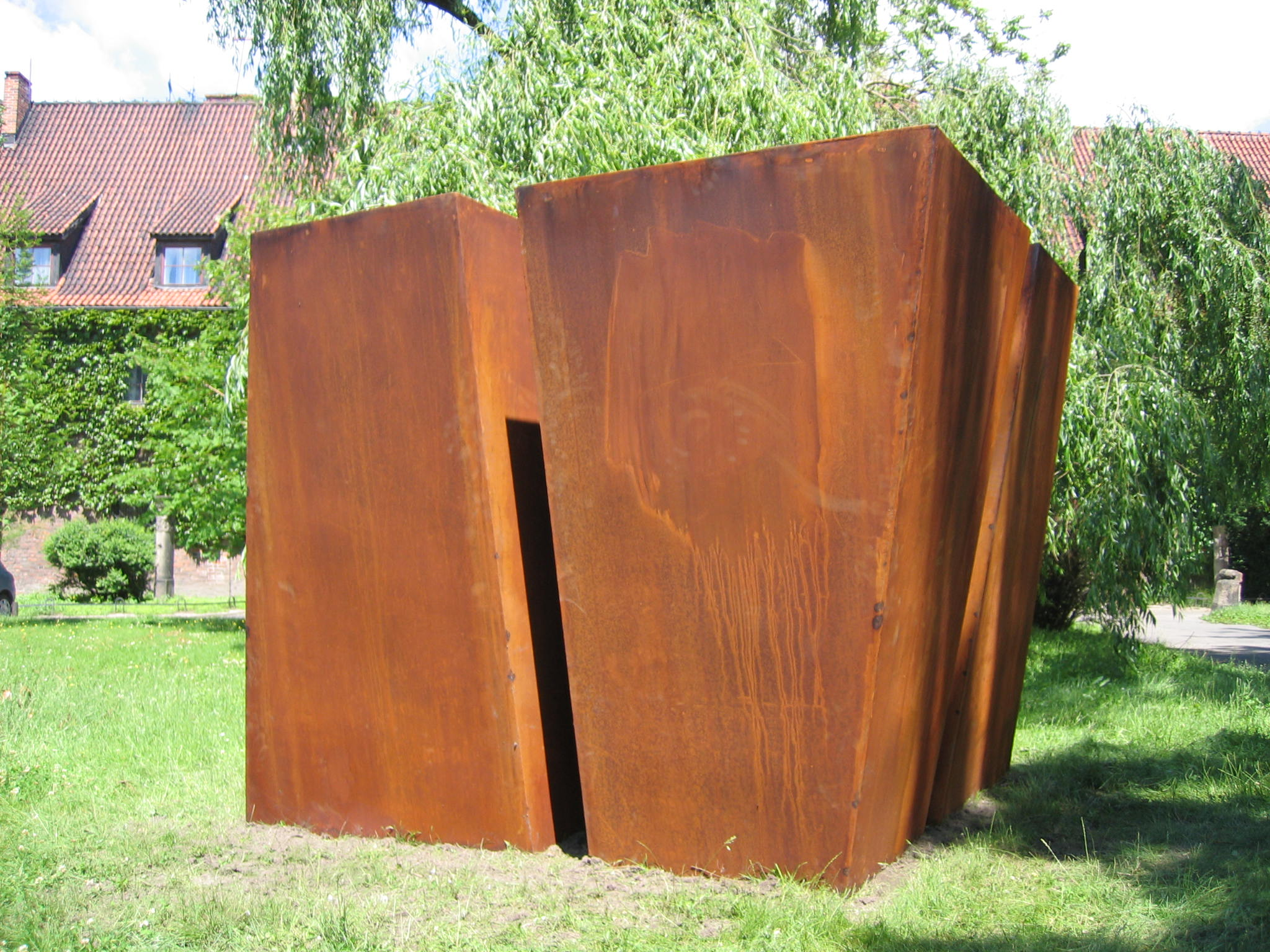
Cube - Museum for Architecture

Even though there are no historical or family roots, Fleckenstein devoted himself in the early 1990s to the changing social situation in Poland and established cross-border ties. Poland eventually became his second home country. Exhibitions and objects, particularly in Wroclaw region identify his allegiance with the city, its culture and Polish life generally. Crucial social issues are addressed with true empathy not only by the location of his Polish studio but his willingness to integrate into the Polish language and culture. e.g. with the installations “Wolnosc“(Freedom) and “Polska droga“ (The Polish Way) The year 2008 was particularly devoted to his “Border“ and “New Polish Way of Life“ exhibitions in Poland, which took place in Poznan, Szczecin, Lublin and Gorzow Wielkopolski.

Kurt Fleckenstein now lives and works in Mannheim and in Wroclaw.

== Publications (excerpt) ==
- K. Fleckenstein, H. P. Kolb, H. Neugebauer, „Visualisierung von Veränderungen des Landschaftsbildes im Steine- und Erden-Bergbau“ ("Visualisation of landscape changes in stone and earth mining") in the magazine Steinbruch und Sandgrube (Quarry and Sandpit), Verlagsgesellschaft Grütter, Hannover, magazine volume 10, October 1998, volume 91
- K. Fleckenstein, S. Reiß, B. Schwoerer-Böhning, „Methoden zur Bewertung von Eingriffen in das Landschaftsbild bei Freileitungen“ (“Methods of assessments of the interference of overhead lines with the landscape”) in: special print of the ANL reports 20 (1996)), by the Bavarian Academy for nature conservation and landscape preservation in Laufen
- K. Fleckenstein, H. Helm, R. Kramer, „Assessment of the landscape within the framework of UVP for gravel mining" in: magazine UVP Report 5/95, December 1995
- K. Fleckenstein, W. Rhiem, „Umwelt- und Landschaftsplanung für Freileitungen“ ("Environmental and landscape planning for power lines") in: ANL Reports, volume 18 (1994), by the Bavarian Academy for nature conservation and landscape preservation in Laufen
- K. Fleckenstein „Die gesellschaftspolitische Bedeutung des Naturschutzes in der Raum- und Landschaftsplanung - eine kritische Anmerkung zum gegenwärtigen Naturschutzverständnis in Deutschland“ ("The socio-political meaning of the nature conservation in the layout and landscape planning - a critical comment on the current comprehension of nature conservation in Germany") in: commemorative publication for Hans Kistenmacher, didactic field and field of research regional planning and town and country planning, University of Kaiserslautern 1994

== Actions /installations/ objects in public spaces (excerpt) ==
- (D) I believe in God, anti-Pegida action at the Frauenkirche in Dresden (2015)
- (D) Special ride, action at the Art Museum „im Kulturspeicher“, Würzburg (2014)
- (UA) Installation “Hommage to Eisenstein”, Museum of Modern Art, Odesa (2009)
- (D) Action “Thanksgiving“at Cathedral Mainz (2008)
- (D) Action “abgefertigt", at the Brandenburg Gate in Berlin (2007)
- (D) Installation “Wiese ²“ on the occasion of the 400th anniversary of Mannheim (2007)
- (D) Object "The wave", Heinrich Vetter Foundation, Ilvesheim (2007)
- (PL) Object "Town Gate", Wrocław (2006)
- (PL) Object "Canted Cube", at the Architecture Museum, Wrocław (2005)

== Participation in exhibitions (excerpt) ==
- (A) Gallery of Salzburg in the Traklhaus, “3.500.000”, Salzburg (2015)
- (D) House of Artists Dortmund, „NO EXIT“, Dortmund (2015)
- (A) Art Society Maerz, cooperation exhibition, Linz (2015)
- (CH) Art Museum Solothurn, „oil track“, Solothurn (2013)
- (RUS) International Art Festival “The Level of a Sea”, Manege, St. Petersburg (2009)
- (D) Humboldt Berlin (Umspannwerk), “Icons of Victory – transFORM”, Berlin (2009)
- (D) Action / Art „In the street“, Kunstverein / Schwetzingen (1.award 2008)
- (PL) Performance Intermedia Festival, Szczecin (2008)
- (PL) Gallery BWA, Gallery of Contemporary Art Lublin, Lublin (2008)
- (PL) Festival “WroclawNonStop”, Wrocław, (2007)

== Individual exhibitions (excerpt) ==
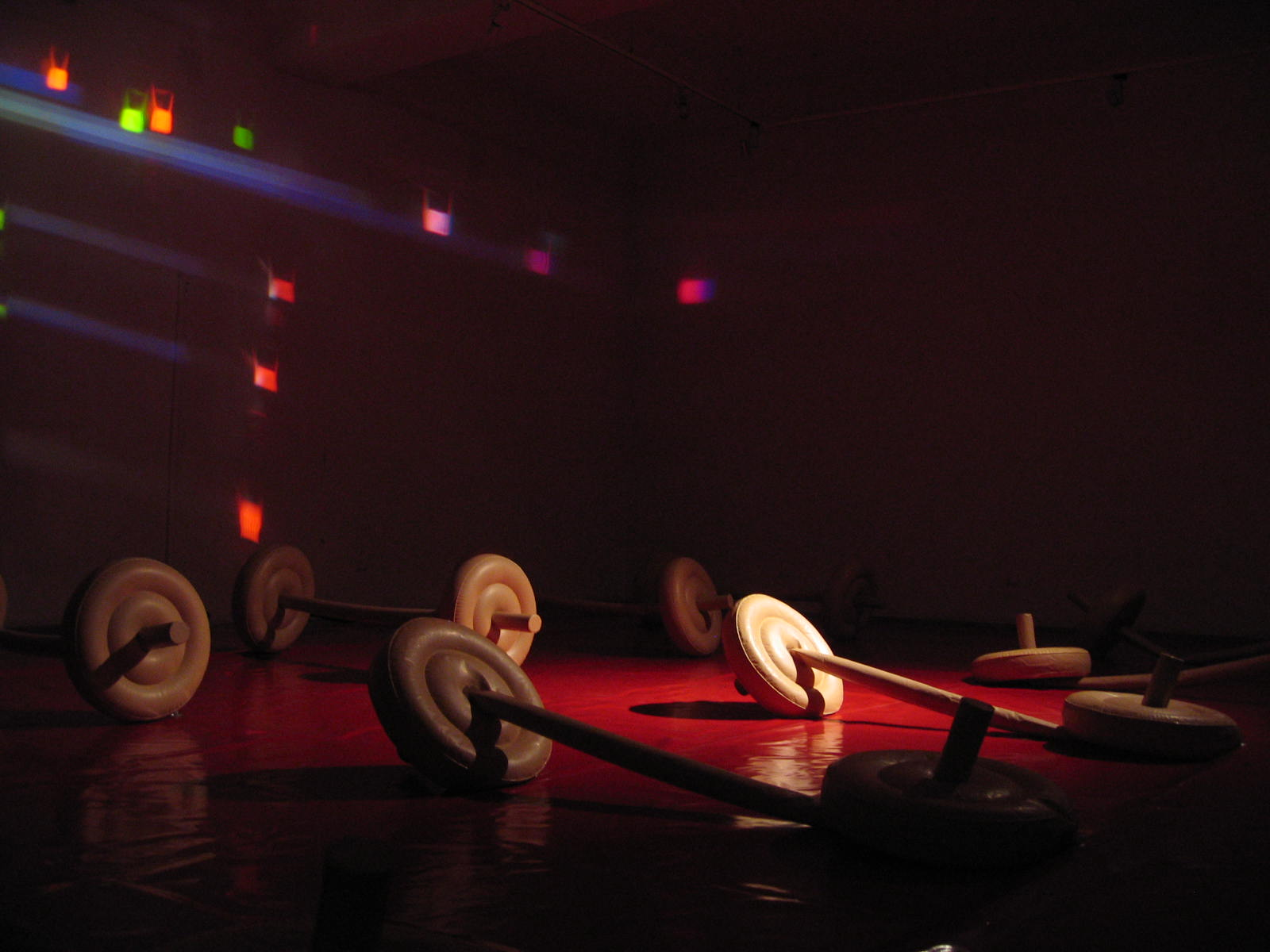
Fitness - BWA Galeria Awangarda

- (D) Art Society in the MIK Museum, Ludwigsburg (2014)
- (D) Saarländisches Künstlerhaus, Saarbrücken (2013)
- (UA) National Art Museum Ukraine, Kyiv (2012)
- (PL) WRO Art Center for media art, Wroclaw (2012)
- (D) Art Hall St. Annen, Lübeck (2012)
- (I) Museum of Contemporary Art - Villa Croce, Genoa (2011)
- (D) GB KUNST -Society of Fine Arts, Trier (2011)
- (UA) Lavra, City Gallery of Kyiv, Kyiv (2011)
- (EST) Art Hall Gallery Kunstihoone, Tallinn (2010)
- (D) Neuer Kunstverein Regensburg, Regensburg (2010)
- (RUS) The Museum of NONCONFORMIST ART, St. Petersburg (2009)
- (D) Gallery KulturForum Europa, Cologne / Vettweiß (2006)
- (PL) Gallery BWA, Galeria Awangarda, Wrocław (2006)
- (PL) Gallery Wzgórze Zamkowe of the municipality of Lubin (2006)
- (PL) Museum of Architecture, Wrocław (catalogue 2005)
