= Granddad (film) =

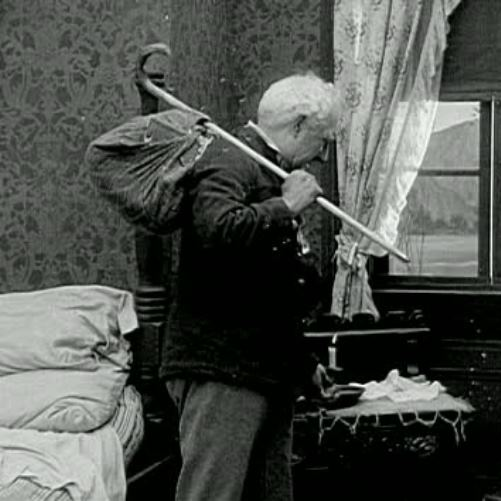
- Still from Granddad
- Directed by: Thomas H. Ince
- Written by: William Clifford (writer)
- Produced by: Thomas H. Ince
- Starring: See below
- Distributed by: Mutual Film
- Release date: 1913
- Running time: 29 minutes
- Country: United States
- Language: English

The full film

Granddad is a 1913 American film directed by Thomas H. Ince.

== Plot ==
Mildred lives with her grandfather, Civil War veteran Jabez Burr, whom she loves deeply. Jabez demonstrates tendencies of heavy drinking regardless of whether or not Mildred is next to him. One day, Mildred's stepmother arrives and smells Jabez's liquor, accusing him of "contaminating" her child. Tensions grow and to avoid more drama and guilt, Jabez leaves, leaving behind nothing but a note. Mildred's father attempts to stop him, but Jabez believes he is coming between their family and insists he must go. His disappearance causes a stir within the family as Mildred cries and her father confronts his wife who believes she acted as any Christian woman should.

Jabez continues to write to his granddaughter, telling her that he is happy working on a farm, however the truth is he is miserable performing the manual labor. Mildred is told by her family that they will be doing charity work at the county's "poor house" where she, to her surprise, finds Jabez who never found a new home. A Southern colonel arrives searching for Jabez, claiming Jabez saved his life during the war. In a flashback, Jabez finds the wounded colonel and carries him all the way to safety. However, Jabez is soon captured by Confederate soldiers. Back in the present, Mildred's father demands they bring him back to the house as no member of their family should be in a "poor house", but shortly after, Jabez suffers a heart attack on the farm and later dies in the hospital. He is given a soldier's funeral as the family laments while the screen fades to black.

== Cast ==
- William Desmond Taylor
- Mildred Harris as Mildred
- Frank Borzage
