= Josef Fleckenstein =

German historian and writer (1919–2004)

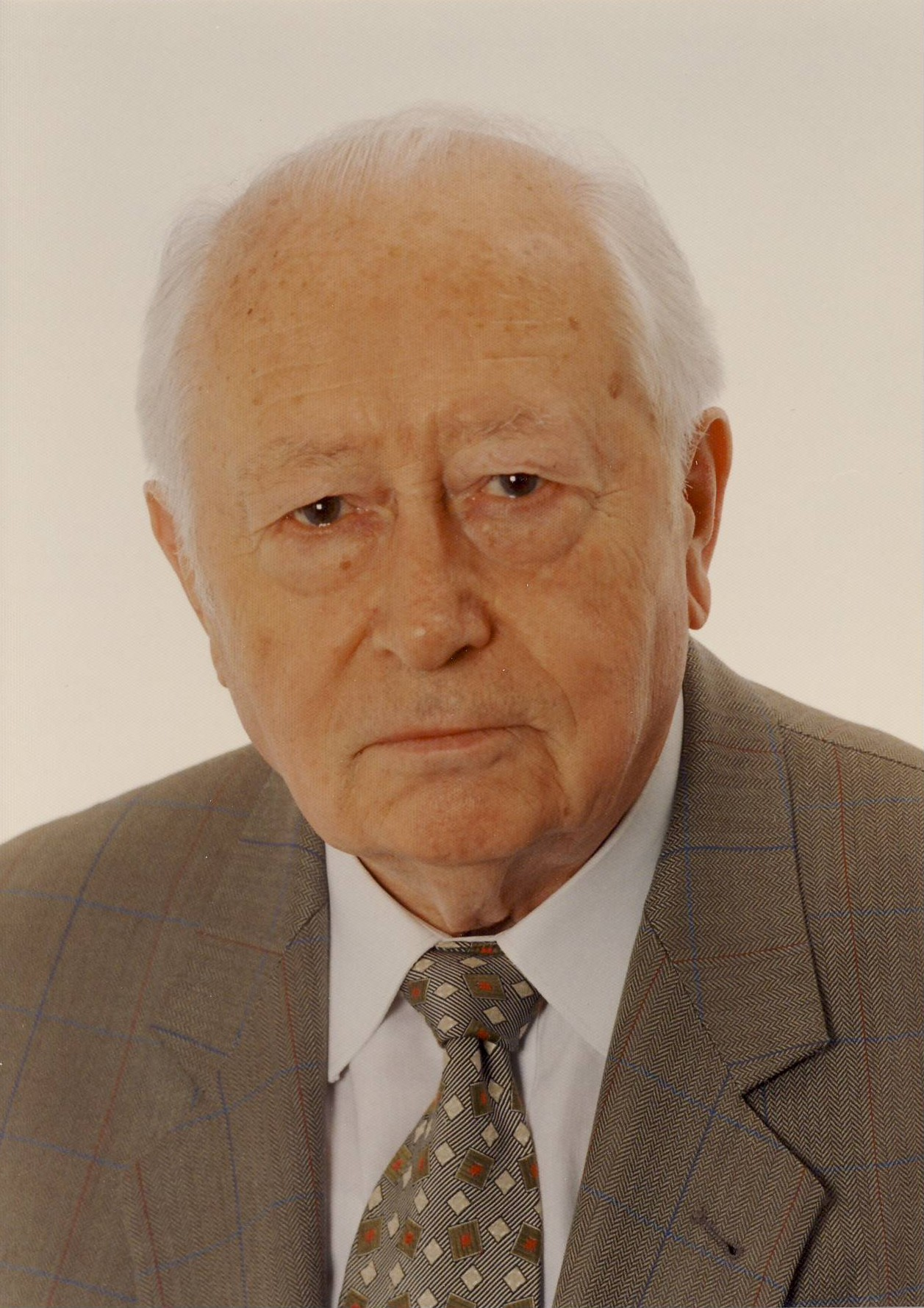
Josef Fleckenstein

Josef Fleckenstein (18 February 1919 in Kämmeritz bei Querfurt - 4 November 2004 in Gottingen) was a German historian and essayist. His central field of research was the Middle Ages. He did his doctorate and habilitation with Gerd Tellenbach in Freiburg. From 1962 to 1965 he was a professor at the University of Frankfurt, then from 1965 to 1971 at the University of Freiburg as Tellenbach's successor. From 1971 to 1987 he directed the Max Planck Institute for History in Göttingen.

== Works ==
- 1953 Die Bildungsreform Karls des Großen
- 1959 Die Hofkapelle der deutschen Könige, volume 1: Grundlegung. Die karolingische Hofkapelle (= Schriften der Monumenta Germaniae Historica, vol. 16, 1-2 ISSN 0080-6951)
- 1962 Karl der Große (= Persönlichkeit und Geschichte. vol. 28, ZDB-ID 528992-0)
- 1966 Die Hofkapelle der deutschen Könige, volume 2: Die Hofkapelle im Rahmen der ottonisch-salischen Reichskirche (= Schriften der Monumenta Germaniae Historica, vol. 16, 1-2 ISSN 0080-6951)
- 1974 Grundlagen und Beginn der deutschen Geschichte (= Deutsche Geschichte. vol. 1, ISBN 3-525-33361-7)
- 2002 Rittertum und ritterliche Welt, ISBN 3-88680-733-9 (The cavalry and the world of chivalry. Includes a study of Spanish cavalry Jesús Rodríguez-Velasco . Madrid, 2006.)
