= Bill Fleckenstein =

American football player (1903–1967)

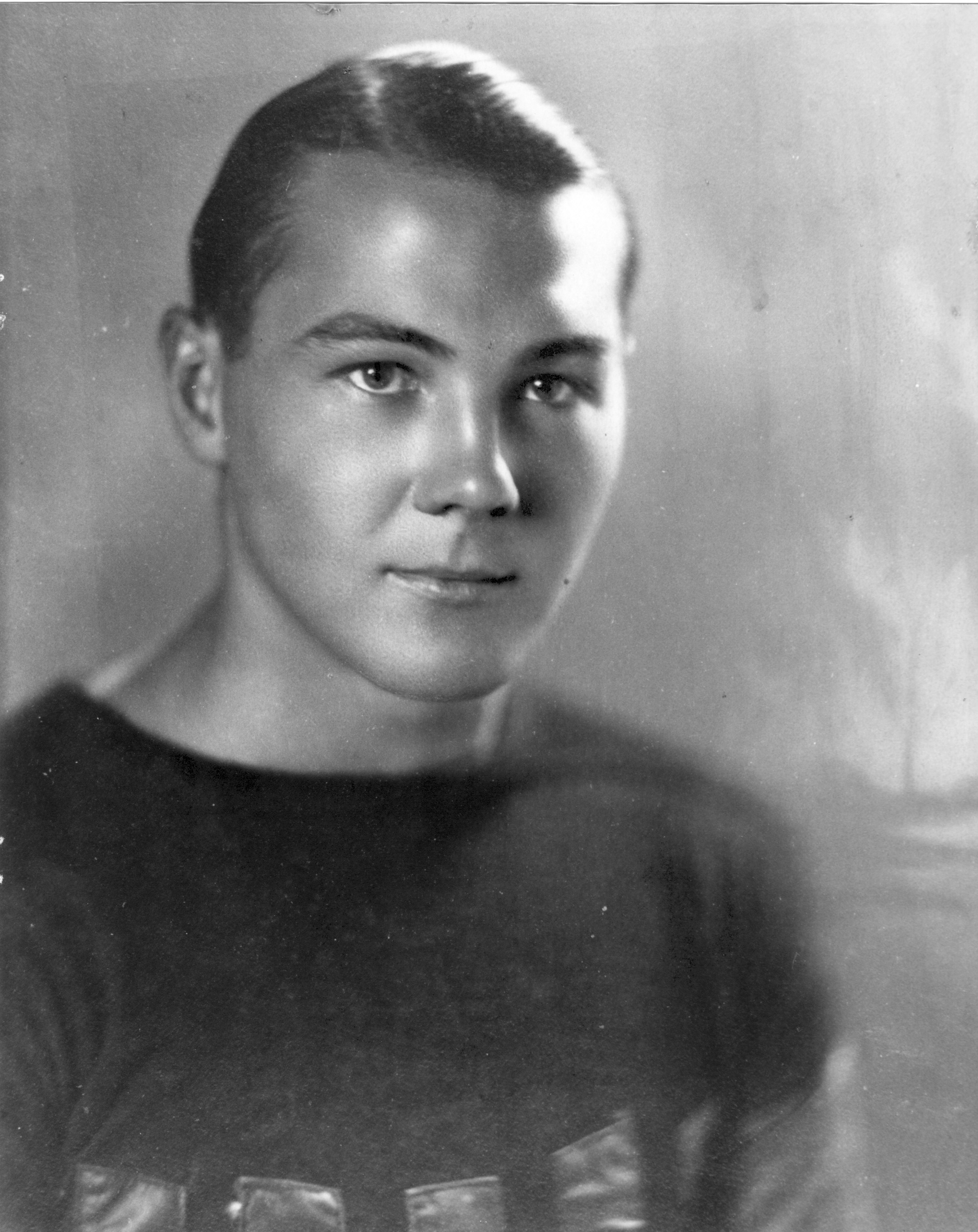

No. 15
- Position: Guard

Personal information
- Born: November 4, 1903; Faribault, Minnesota, U.S.
- Died: January 25, 1967 (aged 63); Los Angeles, California, U.S.
- Listed height: 6 ft 1 in (1.85 m)
- Listed weight: 201 lb (91 kg)

Career information
- High school: Faribault (MN)
- College: Carleton, Iowa

Career history
- Chicago Bears (1925–1930); Portsmouth Spartans (1930); Brooklyn Dodgers (1931); Frankford Yellow Jackets (1931)

Awards and highlights
- Third-team All-American (1924)

Career statistics
- Games played: 84
- Games started: 50
- Touchdowns: 1
- Stats at Pro Football Reference

William Peter Fleckenstein (November 4, 1903 – January 25, 1967) was an American professional football player who was a guard in the National Football League (NFL) for seven seasons with the Chicago Bears, the Portsmouth Spartans, the Brooklyn Dodgers, and the Frankford Yellow Jackets.

In March 1934, he married the actress Mildred Harris, who was previously married to Charlie Chaplin, with whom he lived until her death in 1944.

On April 9, 1946, he married Esther Louise Priebe. They lived in Hollywood, California. They had three children (John William, Cheryl Ann, and Julie Jane).
