= Tsiatsan =

Village in Armavir, Armenia

Tsiatsan Ծիածան
- Location within Armenia
- Coordinates: 40°11′13″N 44°16′00″E
- Country: Armenia
- Marz (Province): Armavir

Population (2011)
  - Total: 1,056
- Time zone: UTC+4 ( )
  - Summer (DST): UTC+5 ( )

Tsiatsan (Armenian: Ծիածան – meaning "rainbow"; until 1978, Grampa) is a village in the Armavir Province of Armenia.

== See also ==
- Armavir Province
