= Ernst Elias Niebergall =

German writer and playwright

Ernst Elias Niebergall (13 January 1815 – 19 April 1843) was a comedic German writer and playwright. He mostly wrote fiction and plays.

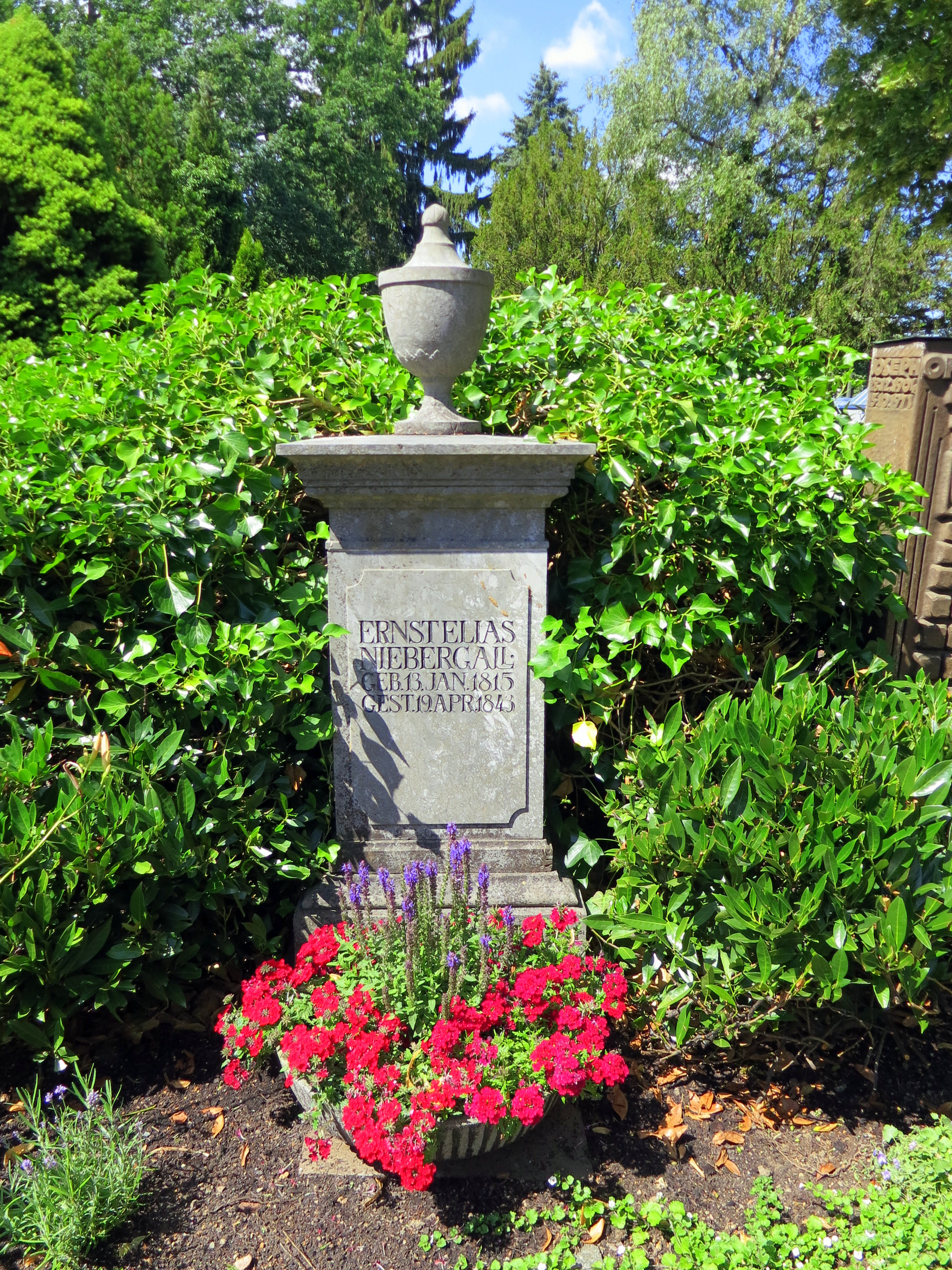
Honorary grave: Ernst Elias Niebergall (Writer) at the old cemetery in Darmstadt (Germany)

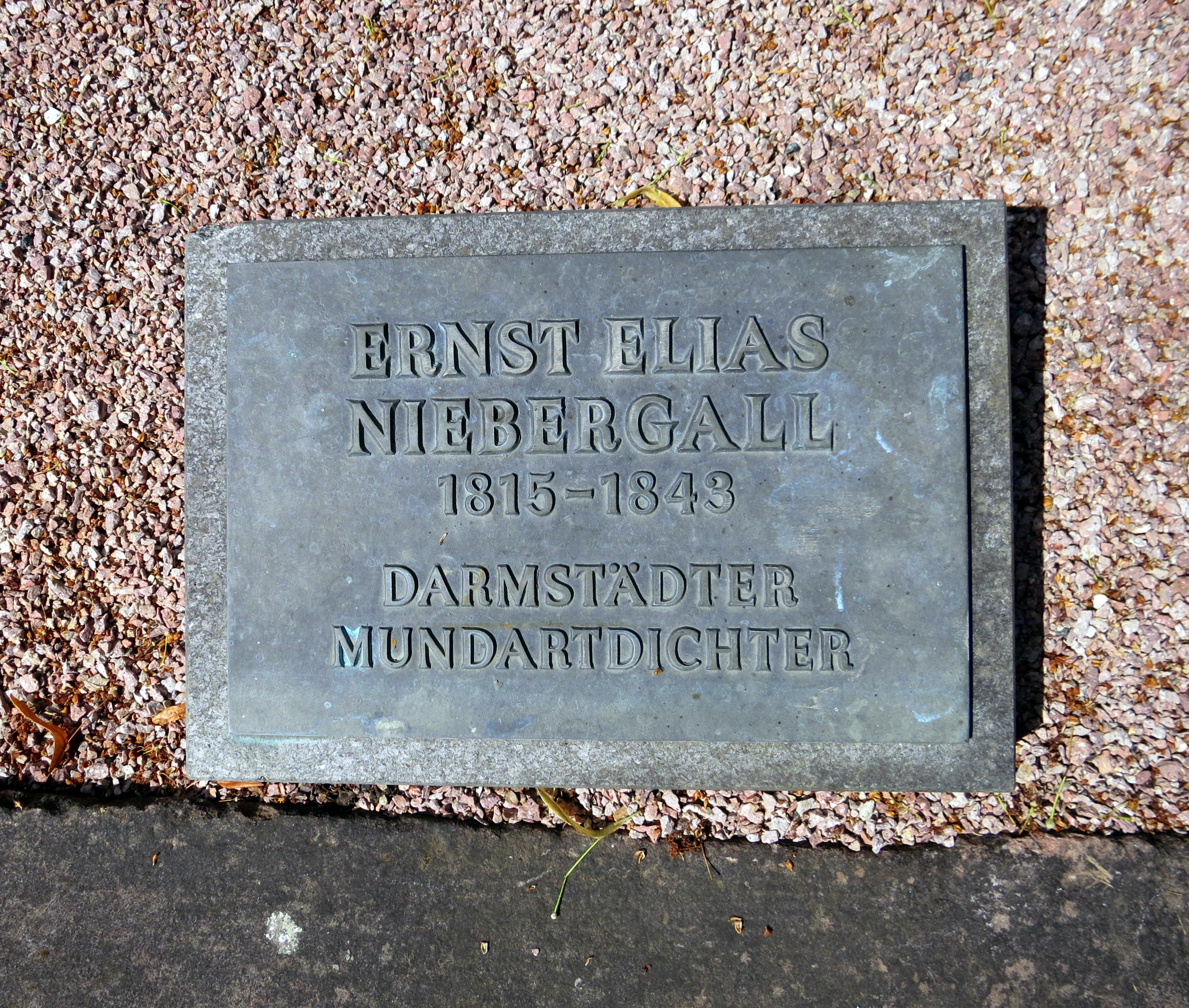
Honorary grave: Ernst Elias Niebergall (Writer) (Grave inscription)

== Biography ==
The son of a musician, Niebergall studied Theology at Gießen. He was involved in the student league Germania where he met Georg Büchner. After the banning of this organization and resulting disciplinary action, he was forced to suspend his theology studies. He became a teacher of Latin and Greek at a school in Dieburg and after 1840 in Darmstadt at Schmitzschen Knabeninstitut, a private school.

== Datterich ==
Nieberhall wrote most of his work under the pseudonyms E. Streff or E. St., and sadly his work was not actually performed during his lifetime. His best known work is the play Datterich (1841). Written in Hessian dialect, it tells the story of a drunken and laid-off finance official.

- "The text of Datterich can be read at gutenberg.de". spiegel.de. Archived from the original on August 24, 2002.

== Other works ==
- Eleven Novellas in the Didaskalia supplement of the Frankfurter Journals (1836–1841)
- "Des Burschen Heimkehr oder: Der Tolle Hund" (1837)
