= October Ferry to Gabriola =

1970 novel by Malcolm Lowry

- Editor: Margerie Bonner (posthumously edited)
- Author: Malcolm Lowry
- Language: English
- Genre: Existential, Love story
- Publisher: The World Publishing Company (US), Douglas & McIntyre (Canada)
- Publication date: 1970
- Publication place: United Kingdom
- Media type: Print (hardcover)
- ISBN: 0888945922

October Ferry to Gabriola is a novel by Malcolm Lowry. Edited by his widow Margerie Bonner, it was posthumously published in 1970.

It is an existential love story featuring a Lowry-like character, Ethan Llewelyn, and his wife, in their never-fully-consummated journey to Gabriola, one of the Gulf Islands off the east coast of Vancouver Island in British Columbia. The themes are living, loving, drinking, travel, mysticism, and literature in the 1940s.

== Details ==
- Lowry, Malcolm (1970), October Ferry to Gabriola. Last Novel (First ed.), New York: The World Publishing Company
- Lowry, Malcolm (1970), October Ferry to Gabriola. Last Novel, Vancouver, BC: Douglas & McIntyre, ISBN 0888945922
