= Ultramarine (novel) =

1933 debut novel by Malcolm Lowry

First edition, (publ. Jonathan Cape)

Ultramarine is the first novel by English writer Malcolm Lowry. Published in 1933, the novel follows a young man aboard a steamer in the early 20th century and his struggle to gain acceptance from his crew mates. Lowry tinkered with the novel until his death, adapting it also to make it fit with his second novel, Under the Volcano (1947).

== Introduction ==
Ultramarine is the story of Dana Hilliot, a young man of a well-to-do family who signs up to sail to the Far East on the Oedipus Tyrannus. The crew, and especially Andy, the "chinless cook", don't readily accept him as one of theirs because Dana is from a different socio-economic class: they all saw how his father, driving a luxury car, dropped him off at the ship, and they know that Dana doesn't need to work for a living as they do. Moreover, Dana is a mess-boy who is not particularly good at his work. The novel's action comes to a head when during shore leave, Dana has found enough courage in liquor to insult Andy, after which the two develop a kind of friendship. Along the way, Dana writes to and pines for his virginal girlfriend back home, Janet; his dedication to her is another challenge to him during shore leave, when his crew mates visit bars and brothels.

== Background and development ==
The novel was written from Lowry's own experience; he had sailed at age 18, starting as a deck hand, on a tramp steamer, and like Hilliot he had gotten permission from his father to delay entrance into university and go to sea for a year. Like Hilliot, Lowry was dropped off at the quay from the family limousine.

Lowry's notes made during his voyage were the basis for two short stories (his first publications) that appeared in Experiment, a Cambridge magazine, in the early 1930s. According to Margerie Bonner, Lowry's wife and editor, these two stories were worked into the novel Ultramarine. The history of the novel's manuscript is muddled and contradictory: Lowry said he'd finished the novel at a friend's house but lost the manuscript, and the friend, Martin Case, later claimed to have found it in his trash can; according to Conrad Aiken, Lowry's idol and friend, a version was kept at his house and Lowry knew about it. The novel was published in 1933 by Jonathan Cape. Afterward, the name of the ship was changed from Nawab to Oedipus Tyrannus, "to conform with Hugh's ship in Under the Volcano."

== The style of the novel ==
The story is a semi-autobiographical account of the life at sea of an unskilled hand on a merchant ship bound for the Far East sometime during the inter-war period (1927). Lowry himself went to sea when he was 18. The novel is partly descriptive, in that it describes in concrete vignettes life on board, but it is also much more than that. In parts, it is poetic and even lyrical, as it purports to reflect the emotions of a very young man confronted with new and fascinating experiences. In other parts, it is philosophical, as the hero indulges in lengthy musings and reflections on life in general, life on board the ship, and his own life in particular. Dialogues form an important part of the novel too, and they are frequently written in very realistic, vivid and crude language, reflecting faithfully (one supposes) the language used by the crew on board the ship, who are, after all, working-class men with little or no formal education.

The combination of these different styles gives the novel a fairly unique flavor. However, occasionally but not too often, the dialogues and the author's personal reflections (which are intertwined) may seem overlong, with the risk that they may border on the tedious. Also, the mixture of vulgar and obscene language on the one hand (that used by the crew and the hero when dealing with them), and academic or semi-philosophical ramblings on the other (when the author/hero is left to his own devices) — this mixture can feel contrived at times. Some readers may feel that the style borders on the pompous and the arcane in places, when the author quotes Ancient Greek or Norwegian (since the hero is supposed to be part-Norwegian). Overall, one feels that the style is not quite as rounded and sophisticated as it purports to be — no doubt the sign of a novel written by a very young man. (Lowry was not even 25 when he wrote it.)

== Key themes in the novel ==
The story is that of a voyage by sea on a British merchant ship in 1927, from the UK to the Far East (Japan and China). The ship is due to return to Britain from the Far East, but the second leg of the trip is not narrated. (In fact, while out in the East, the crew are told that they will go from Britain to America and back, after their journey back from China, before being allowed to go home!)

Little happens on board the ship, where time is shared between working (mainly, for the hero, a case of serving food to the crew and scrubbing the deck) and chatting (the crew have endless and bitty conversations in the course of which they swap anecdotes while playing cards). When in port, the crew leave the ship to go on memorable drinking binges that take them from one bar and nightclub to the next till they are close to collapsing in the street. Inevitably, many (if not most) finish the night in the arms of a prostitute (something they can then boast about once back on board the ship). The fear of sexually transmitted diseases is, therefore, a frequent topic of conversation. Only once does the hero appear to join fellow crew members to go drinking himself, while dreaming of having sex with a prostitute, if only to be ‘like the others’.

A major underlying theme of the book is that of the rite of passage: Dana Hilliot, the central character, is not accepted by the rest of the crew, and is forever trying to fit in. Things are complicated by the fact that he is a slightly introverted young man and that, although he desperately wants to fit in, he does not want to admit it — not even to himself or to the reader, at any rate at the start. Dana's problem is that he chose to go to sea and that, for him, it is a short-term ‘adventure’; on top of it, he is middle-class (or perhaps even upper-middle-class) and well-educated. (All the other crew members noticed that he was driven to the port in his father's limousine on the 1st day!) There is, as a result, a considerable class divide between Dana and the rest of the crew.

The other crew members never chose to become sailors and cannot understand that anyone with any other options could possibly want to work in the merchant navy. Yet, they like their life at sea, in the main. At any rate, they have been in the merchant navy for too long and could not contemplate going back to a more sedentary life. This does not mean that they are truly happy or contented, or that they can understand why someone would choose to become a sailor. More to the point, Dana is seen as a ‘part-timer’ and an amateur whereas they are professionals doing the job for a living — because they have to. As a result, Dana, branded the outsider and the intellectual, gets little sympathy from the others. Some of them, in fact, are quite hostile to him. All this boils down to the opposition, in social-class terms, between them (who are working-class) and him (who is not).

One way of being accepted would be to play cards with the other men, but Dana never even tries. Another way would be to go drinking with them, but Dana is at first reluctant to indulge in this pleasure, for reasons that are not clear. (It turns out he wins the respect of his fellow crew members in due course as a heavy drinker who can hold his drinks!) Another way towards acceptance is, increasingly, in Dana's eyes, to go whoring while the ship is in port. But, here, we have a problem, because the hero is a sensitive young man who has moral scruples. These moral scruples are made far worse by the fact that Dana is in love with his girlfriend back home, a girl called Janet, who does write to him from time to time. It is not clear whether the two ever had sex together, so that one gets the impression Dana might still be a virgin — in which case the desire to have sex with a prostitute would acquire, somewhat, a sense of urgency. (But this is never made clear; the author bashfully glosses over this.)

As a result, for most of the book, the hero is forever reflecting upon his inability to fit in with the rest of the crew, and not doing very much about it. This aspect may seem tedious to some readers, after a while. Round the end of the novel, at long last, and after an incident with a crew member who has become his tormentor (the cook, who is also a bully), Dana can feel that he has been accepted, which is what he wanted all along. This is achieved through confronting the cook in question in front of all the other crew members (and one wonders why he waited so long before doing it!), and thanks to the fact that, eventually, Dana went drinking and whoring while the ship was in port. Dana has won his credentials: he is one of them, and the novel can end, which it does, without much of a genuine ending at all, for that matter.

The theme of love lost and sentimental longing (as Dana tells the reader that he is constantly missing Janet's presence) is present right through the novel. This acts as a distraction in a way, as it prevents the narrator (and the reader) from concentrating on the theme of life at sea. It colours the whole journey for Dana: basically, most of the time, he is not enjoying himself, if only because he would much rather be with Janet than on a merchant ship somewhere between Suez and Hong Kong. This raises the question of why he left England in the first place... The recurrent tear-jerking focused on Janet's absence and her infrequent letters could be deemed almost mawkish at times — the reaction of a teenager who wants to have his cake and eat it (i.e. spend a year at sea, yet remain close to his sweetheart).

The novel remains very interesting and quite unique in its tone and style. Symbolically, one could see it as a metaphor for one's journey through life and through society. For Dana Hilliot, the central character, it is a coming-of-age story: confronted with a bully (Andy, the cook from Scotland), Dana has to stand up for himself, which gains him acceptance by the rest of the crew (and by Andy himself). The issue of class — the gulf between Dana and the rest of the crew — is analysed in perceptive fashion right through the story.

== Summary of the story ==
We are introduced to Dana, an ordinary seaman, at the start of the novel, as he is hired. The name of the ship is, with typical literary undertones of the kind that permeate the novel, the « Oedipus Tyrannus ». Right from the start, Dana is up against the hostility of the crew: « Useless, we don’t know what sort of bloody man you are at all. Just a nancy. […] He knew that they thought he wasn’t one of them ». The cook, Andy, or another crew member, has said: « I hate those bloody toffs who come to sea for experience ». The crew are just « plain working men, like »: « I’m just a plain British working man »). Their racial prejudices are on a par with their social conceptions (see references to « Chinks » and « Niggers »).

A recurrent theme is that of the boredom of life at sea. Far from exciting, the journey turns out to be repetitive and uneventful. As often with tales of life at sea, there is nothing romantic about it all (and, in this respect, Lowry does seem to tell the truth, as opposed to embellishing it). The sea is hostile and threatening; the ship is cramped and uncomfortable; the work is back-breaking and boring; and, finally, ports are all the same — smoky bars, garish lights, provocative prostitutes, and so on. As Dana puts it: « All the days were the same […] Today, or is it yesterday? […] No, there was precious little meaning left now in this life which so surprisingly had opened out before him ». « Still, what was there to see? Nothing […]. It was the same in any seaport town at night. He might as well be back in Liverpool — or Swansea! ». As a German seaman puts it more succinctly: « But everywhere is the same ».

Andy, « the chinless cook » who is openly hostile to Dana and full of scorn for him, states: « I suppose you think it’s pretty good coming to sea. Well, you’ll find out pretty soon what it’s like; it’s just a question of working as hell — one port’s the same as another ». As another seaman puts it: « Well, a man who’d go to sea for fun’d go to hell for a pastime ». The motivation behind Dana Hilliot's decision to go to sea remains a mystery but, after all, nothing truly explains why other seamen choose this harsh life a long way from home either.

Dana is acutely aware that, due to Andy's hostility, he will not be able to « justify his [Dana Hilliot’s] presence on the ship »; Dana feels he must ‘shine’ in his work or perform some act of « heroism » to gain « acceptance ». Getting accepted by Andy, who enjoys prestige and power among ordinary crew members, will secure Dana's acceptance by the whole crew, Dana Hilliot feels. Dana is willing to do « anything » to show that « he was one of them, that he did belong ». Andy resents Dana Hilliot's presence partly because he feels the youngster is « doing a good lad out of his job ». Other crew members warn Dana Hilliot against getting on the wrong side of Andy, who never fails to brand him useless and « a nuisance ».

After several weeks, the ship reaches the port of Tsjang-Tsjang after Shanghai. « And once more his thoughts turned tenderly to Janet ». Dana feels « desolate and miserable, wishing that he could have stayed in England with Janet for ever ». Dana Hilliot feels « gladness in his soul » as they sail into port, « but the old despair came back […]. If Janet could only see this with him! ». Another port is yet another test of Dana's love for Janet — to put it bluntly, will he betray her by going with a prostitute, or not? The joy of being in port is, therefore, instantly ruined by this constant and painful moral dilemma!

To avoid having to make a decision, Dana tends to stay on board when the ship is in port. The truth is that Dana feels « afraid of living, afraid of manhood »: he would like to be adventurous, but he is not. « Andy with his go-ashore suit, all dolled up to go ashore, Andy the chinless wonder, going to give the girls a treat » does not fail to show his « contempt » for Dana. As for the quartermaster, he quite openly suggests a homosexual affair to Dana Hilliot, which the latter politely declines.

Dana explains that he was born in Norway — the sailors on the ship are British or Norwegian. The ship was built in Norway but flies the British flag. Dana marvels at how the ship's crew have become « a community » — a community Dana does not belong to. Yet, there is a marked difference between (ordinary) sailors (who work on deck, referred to as « seamen ») and « the firemen » (who work the machines in the bowels of the ship). As a galley-boy working under the authority of the cook, Dana is clearly at the bottom of the heap. The cook himself — perhaps because his role matters to all the hands on board! — enjoys a surprisingly influential (and even powerful) position.

Dana Hilliot gives a glimpse of his history and its « wandering, harborless, dispossessed characteristics ». He talks about his « queer » family. Dana is worried that his stay out at sea may change him forever, may cost him his virginity (something he is eagerly praying for!), and may estrange him from Janet. At times, his musings take on religious overtones mixed with irony, for example when he refers to himself as the lord's « unworthy and unwashed servant », the « Liverpool-Norwegian ».

Eventually, Dana Hilliot makes up his mind: he will go ashore and enjoy himself — he does not care anymore. He wants to be « a man, a hell of a fellow like Andy », and feels that « Janet wouldn’t mind that ». This will secure his acceptance by « the community », Dana Hilliot feels: he wants to be one of them, and whoring is part of the process. Dana yearns to be « the hero, the monster ». When Dana is given two letters addressed to him — one from his mother and one from Janet — he chooses not to read the latter, as if his girlfriend were trying to check on him and to talk him out of his decision to go ashore. Dana says: « My mind was made up. And suddenly I hated her for the letter! ».

When ashore in a Japanese port, Dana Hilliot meets a German seaman and they spend a good deal of the night drinking together, talking in English and German, and getting terribly drunk. The locals only get a cursory look: « A native came from behind the counter [of the bar] like a spider from under his leaf ». Indeed, the local population are reduced to the role of attending staff, whether they are male (bartenders, waiters, rickshaw runners, etc.) or female (prostitutes). At an advanced stage of the night, Dana is taken by « a pimp » to a brothel-cum-bar-cum-nightclub. Dana is soon dancing with an attractive European prostitute who claims to be a Russian refugee. When he remembers Janet's letter, Dana Hilliot cannot do the deed: he staggers out of the bar in order to take a breath of fresh air and to read his girl's letter.

As he sits down in another bar, Dana realises that he has lost it, which makes him feel miserable and sinful. (In fact, Dana gave the letter to the German sailor for him to read it, but he did not, and merely put it in his pocket.) When Dana goes back to the brothel, he finds Olga (the Russian girl) dancing with...Andy. The morning after, the cook boasts that he had sex with Olga. The charm, if charm there was, is broken, and the desire to ‘sin’ is gone: Dana Hilliot has become an adult. Dana Hilliot now feels that he must push his conflict with Andy to its limit: why not kill him by pushing him overboard, he muses.

At long last, the tension between Dana Hilliot and Andy finds its solution and its conclusion when Dana confronts — very publicly — the Scottish cook: « Now then, it’s about time I had this out with you ». Dana denies that he does his job badly or that he has pinched menial items belonging to the other men on board, and adds: « I’ve got something more to say; I haven’t wanted to fight before […]. » But now, Dana is ready to fight the Glaswegian cook. To provoke him, he insults him by referring to his strange chin: « if you’d got a chin, you little bastard, I’d hit you on it! » Andy's reaction is curiously muted while the rest of the crew plead with Dana to « go easy ». As Andy leaves the room, the others explain to Dana that he lost his chin during WWI, and the doctors put some metal plates in his smashed face to support it, hence his chinless appearance.

Dana, from proud and courageous, now feels awful and cowardly that he confronted the cook in such a manner. Dana asks Andy to « forgive » him: they are now going to be, at long last, ‘friends’. It now occurs to Dana that « there was a feeling of peace » on the ship — he is no longer restless and impatient. Andy accepts Dana Hilliot's apology and, himself, admits that he has been « wrong » previously. « Peace was made », and Dana is happy to be on « the strong, generous ship he knew ».

The German sailor made sure that Janet's letter was forwarded to Dana Hilliot. When, at long last, Dana gets to read it, it is full of love and affection. Dana Hilliot realises that his « initial inferiority towards Andy » was misguided: he is the one who is superior, thanks to the strength of his love for Janet. Dana realises that he, at least, has a woman who loves him back in England — most of the other crew members are lonely figures at best, who go from one port and one prostitute to the next, in a never-ending quest that takes them home for a few weeks per year, at best.

The crowning of Dana's integration into the crew — after his night out in port in Japan and his confrontation with Andy — comes when he is asked to work in the engine room with the firemen, because several of them have fallen ill. Dana Hilliot gladly accepts and sees this as an obvious and flattering promotion. The last sentence in the book reads, rather oddly: « But, oh, Janet, no sorrow is so bad as that which quite goes by ».
