= Reno (1923 film) =

1923 film

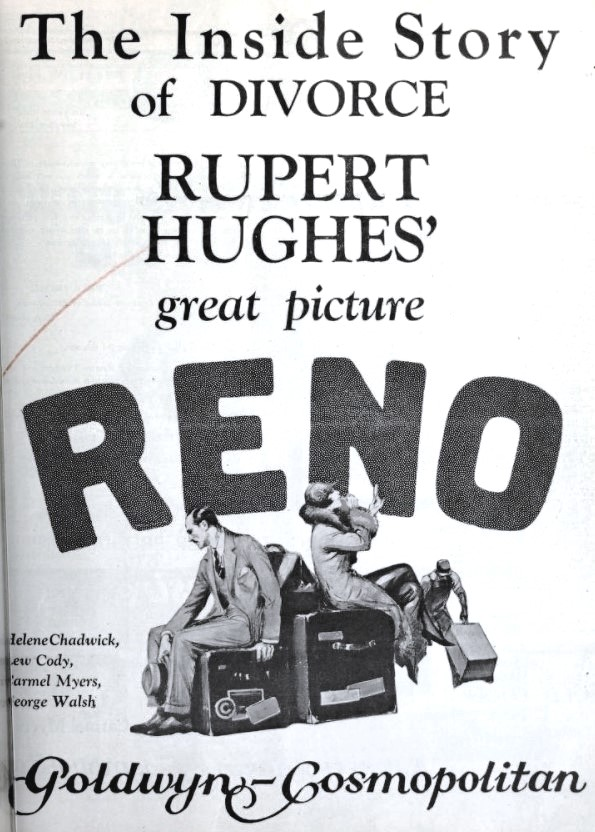
- Advertisement
- Directed by: Rupert Hughes
- Written by: Rupert Hughes
- Produced by: Louis B. Mayer
- Starring: Helene Chadwick
- Cinematography: John J. Mescall
- Production company: Goldwyn Pictures
- Distributed by: Goldwyn-Cosmopolitan Distributing Corporation
- Release date: December 9, 1923 (United States)
- Running time: 70 minutes
- Country: United States
- Language: Silent (English intertitles)

Reno is a 1923 American silent melodrama film produced and distributed by Goldwyn Pictures and was written and directed by Rupert Hughes. Hughes provided his own story to the film which followed Souls for Sale. The film stars Helene Chadwick and Lew Cody.

== Cast ==
- Helene Chadwick as Mrs. Emily Dysart Tappan
- Lew Cody as Roy Tappan
- George Walsh as Walter Heath
- Carmel Myers as Mrs. Dora Carson Tappan
- Dale Fuller as Aunt Alida Kane
- Hedda Hopper as Mrs. Kate Norton Tappan
- Kathleen Key as Yvette, the Governess
- Rush Hughes as Jerry Dysart (Emily's brother)
- Margerie Bonner as Marjory Towne
- Robert DeVilbiss as Paul Tappan (Emily's son)
- Virginia Loomis as Ivy Tappan (Emily's daughter)
- Richard Wayne as Arthur Clayton
- Hughie Mack as Justice of the Peace
- Boyce Combe as Hal Carson
- Victor Potel as Detective McRae
- Percy Hemus as Lemile Hake
- Maxine Elliott Hicks as Mattie Hake
- Billy Eugene as Tod Hake (credited as Billy Eugene)
- Adele Watson as Mrs. Tod Hake
- Evelyn Sherman as Mrs. Towne
- Jack Curtis as Hod Stoat
- Patterson Dial as Mrs. Hod Stoat

== Production ==
Reno was partially filmed on location at Yellowstone National Park.

== Preservation ==
A print is preserved by Metro-Goldwyn-Mayer.
