= Malcolm Lowry =

English poet and novelist

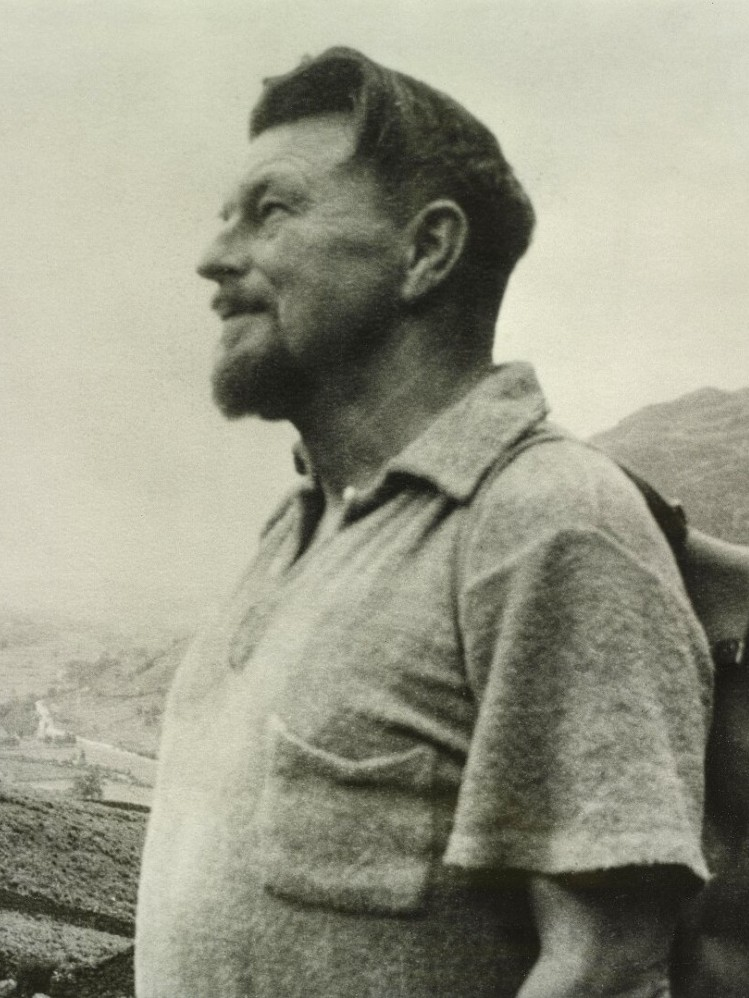
- Lowry in 1957
- Born: Clarence Malcolm Lowry; 28 July 1909; New Brighton, England
- Died: 26 June 1957 (aged 47); Ripe, England
- Occupations: Novelist, poet
- Spouses: Jan Gabrial (m. 1934; div. 1937) Margerie Bonner (m. 1940)
- Writing career
- Notable works: Ultramarine (1933); Under the Volcano (1947); Hear Us O Lord from Heaven Thy Dwelling Place (1961); Lunar Caustic (1968); Dark as the Grave wherein my Friend is Laid (1968); October Ferry to Gabriola (1970)
- Literary movement: Modernism

Clarence Malcolm Lowry (/ˈlaʊri/; 28 July 1909 – 26 June 1957) was an English poet and novelist who is best known for his 1947 novel Under the Volcano, which was voted No. 11 in the Modern Library's 100 Best Novels list.

== Biography ==
=== Early years in England ===
Lowry was born in New Brighton, Wirral, the fourth son of Evelyn Boden and Arthur Lowry, a cotton broker with roots in Cumberland. In 1912, the family moved to Caldy, on another part of the Wirral peninsula. Their home was a mock Tudor estate on two acres with a tennis court, small golf course and a maid, a cook and a nanny. Lowry was said to have felt neglected by his mother, and was closest to his brother. He began drinking alcohol at the age of 14.

In his teens Lowry was a boarder at The Leys School in Cambridge, the school made famous by the novel Goodbye, Mr. Chips. At age 15, he won the junior golf championship at the Royal Liverpool Golf Club, Hoylake. His father expected him to go to Cambridge and enter the family business, but Malcolm wanted to experience the world and convinced his father to let him work as a deckhand on a tramp steamer to the Far East. In May 1927, his parents drove him to the Liverpool waterfront and, while the local press watched, waved goodbye as he set sail on the freighter S.S. Pyrrhus. The five months at sea gave him stories to incorporate into his first novel, Ultramarine.

After returning to Britain Lowry enrolled at St Catharine's College, Cambridge, in autumn 1929, in an attempt to placate his parents. He spent little time at the university, however, and his penchant for drink was already apparent; Hugh Sykes Davies, one of Lowry's academic supervisors and later a friend, found that the only place in which it was possible to teach him was in a pub. Nonetheless, he excelled in writing, graduating in 1932 with a third-class honours degree in English upon submitting several extracts of his first draft of Ultramarine for examination. During his first term, his roommate, Paul Fitte, killed himself. Fitte had wanted a homosexual relationship, which Lowry refused. Lowry felt responsible for his death and was haunted by it for the rest of his life. Lowry was already well travelled; besides his sailing experience, between terms he made visits to America, to befriend his literary idol, Conrad Aiken, and to Norway and Germany.

After Cambridge, Lowry lived briefly in London, existing on the fringes of the vibrant Thirties literary scene and meeting Dylan Thomas. He met his first wife, Jan Gabrial, in Spain. They were married in France in 1934. Theirs was a turbulent union, especially due to his drinking, and because she resented homosexuals attracted to her husband.

=== United States, Mexico, Canada ===
After an estrangement, Lowry followed Jan to New York City where, almost incoherent after an alcohol-induced breakdown, he checked into Bellevue Psychiatric Hospital in 1936 – experiences which later became the basis of his novella Lunar Caustic. When the authorities began to take notice of him, he fled to avoid deportation and then went to Hollywood, where he tried screenwriting. At about that time he began writing Under the Volcano. Lowry and Jan moved to Mexico, arriving in the city of Cuernavaca on 2 November 1936, the Day of the Dead, in a final attempt to salvage their marriage. Lowry continued to drink heavily, though he also devoted more energy to his writing.

The effort to save their marriage failed. Jan saw that he wanted a mother figure, and she did not want to mother him. She then ran off with another man in late 1937. Alone in Oaxaca, Lowry entered into another period of dark alcoholic excess, culminating in his deportation from Mexico in the summer of 1938. His family put him up at the Hotel Normandie in Los Angeles where he continued working on his novel and met his second wife, the actress and writer Margerie Bonner. His father sent his rent checks directly to the Normandie's hotel manager.

In August Lowry moved to Vancouver, leaving his manuscript behind. Later, Margerie moved up to Vancouver, bringing his manuscript, and the following year they married. At first, they lived in an attic apartment in the city. When World War II broke out, Lowry tried to enlist but was rejected. Correspondence between Lowry and Governor-General of Canada Lord Tweedsmuir (better known as the writer John Buchan) during this time resulted in Lowry's writing several articles for the Vancouver newspaper The Province. The couple lived and wrote in a squatter's shack on the beach near the community of Dollarton, north of Vancouver. In 1944, the beach shack was destroyed by a fire, and Lowry was injured in his efforts to save manuscripts.

Margerie was a positive influence, editing Lowry's work skilfully and making sure that he ate as well as drank (she drank, too). The couple traveled to Europe, America and the Caribbean, and while Lowry continued to drink heavily, this seems to have been a relatively peaceful and productive period. It lasted until 1954, when a final nomadic period ensued, embracing New York, London and other places. During their travels to Europe, Lowry twice attempted to strangle Margerie.

He lived in Canada for much of his active writing career and is thus also considered a significant figure in Canadian literature. He won the Governor General's Award for English-language fiction in 1961 for his posthumous collection Hear Us O Lord from Heaven Thy Dwelling Place.

=== Death ===
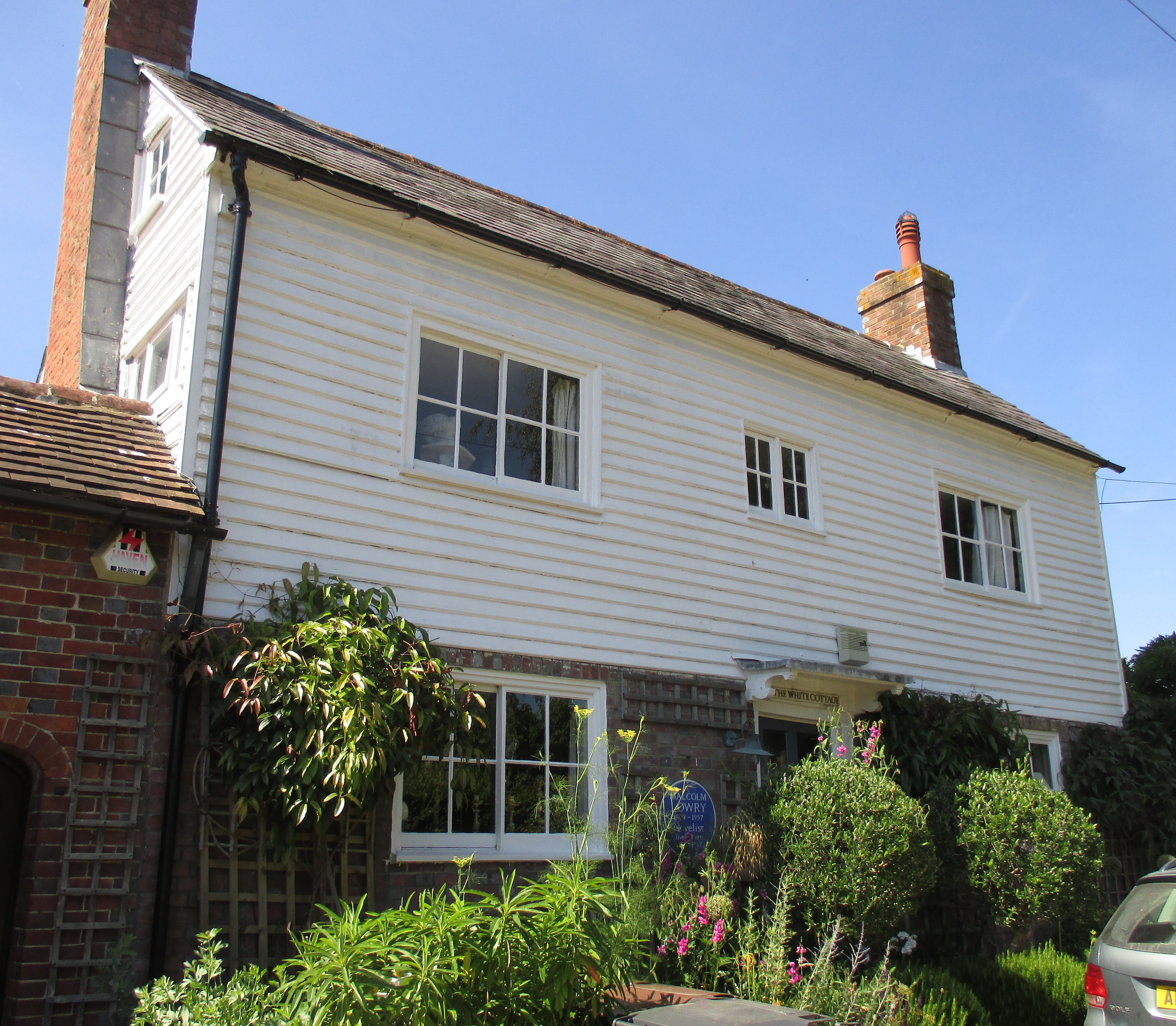
The White Cottage, Ripe, East Sussex, his last home

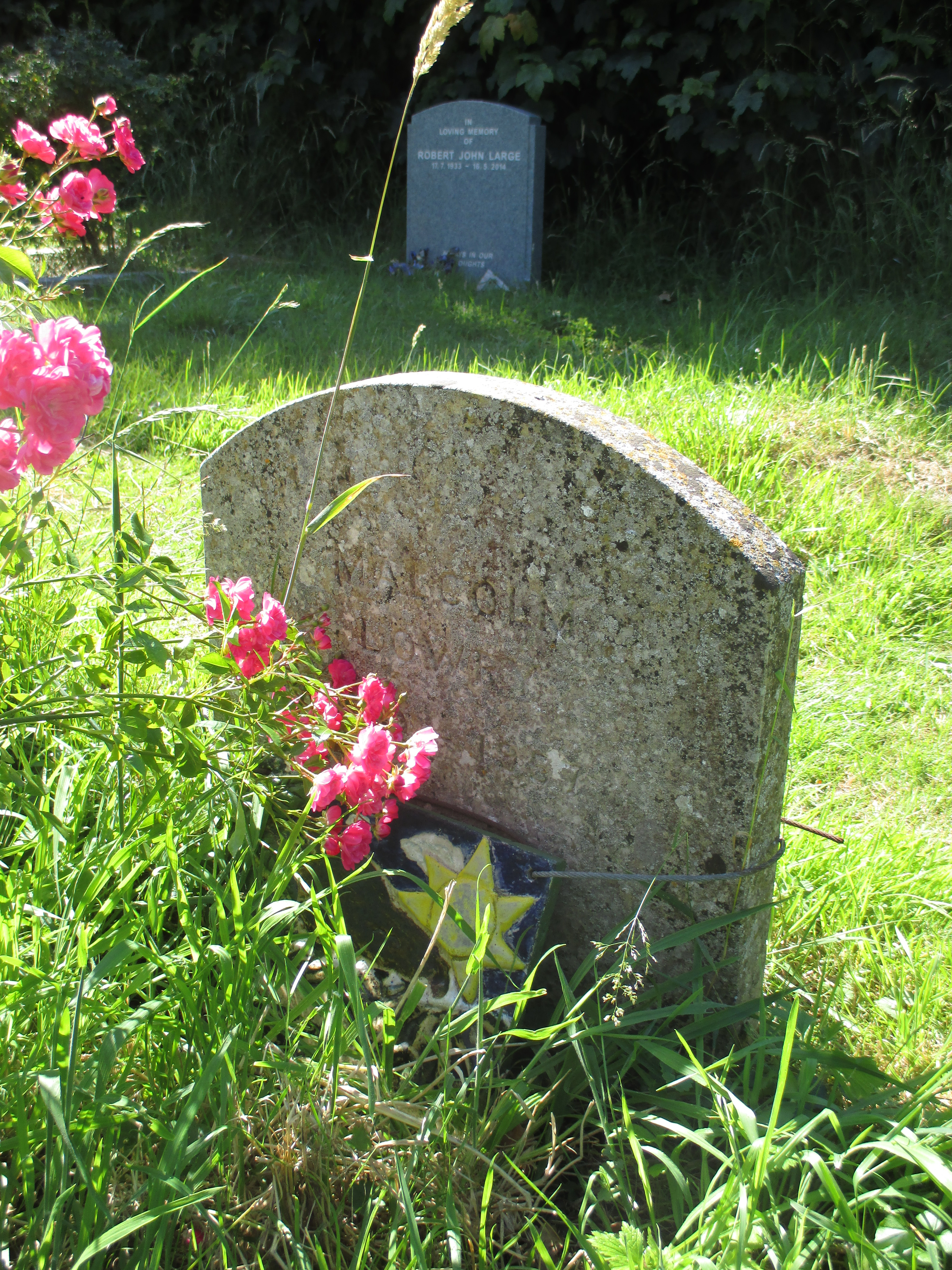
His gravestone in the churchyard of St John the Baptist's Church, Ripe, East Sussex

Lowry died in June 1957, in a rented cottage in the village of Ripe, Sussex, where he was living with wife Margerie after having returned to England in 1955, ill and impoverished. The coroner's verdict was death by misadventure, and the causes of death given as inhalation of stomach contents, barbiturate poisoning, and excessive consumption of alcohol.

It has been suggested that his death was a suicide. Inconsistencies in the accounts given by his wife at various times about what happened on the night of his death have also given rise to suspicions of murder.

Lowry is buried in the churchyard of St John the Baptist in Ripe. Lowry wrote in his 1940 poem "Epitaph": "Here lies Malcolm Lowry, late of the Bowery, whose prose was flowery, and often glowery. He lived nightly, and drank daily, and died playing the ukulele," but the epitaph does not appear on his gravestone.

=== Papers ===
Margerie Lowry deposited the Malcolm Lowry papers in her possession with the University of British Columbia in 1961. This initial deposit has been continuously augmented by material deposited by friends and family of the Lowrys, Lowry scholars and collectors, or purchased at auction.

In 2017 the British Library acquired the Malcolm Lowry papers that had been in the possession of his first wife, Jan Gabrial. These had been entrusted to Gabrial's mother, Emily Vanderheim, in 1936 and passed to Gabrial on her mother's death. The library later acquired further items from Margerie Lowry's sister, Priscilla Bonner.

== Writings ==
Lowry published little during his lifetime, in comparison with the extensive collection of unfinished manuscripts he left. Of the two novels that he himself finished and saw through publication, Under the Volcano (1947) is now widely accepted as his masterpiece and one of the great works of the 20th century (number 11 on the Modern Library's 100 Best Novels of the 20th century).

Ultramarine (1933), written while Lowry was still an undergraduate, follows a young man's first sea voyage and his determination to gain the crew's acceptance.

A collection of short stories, Hear Us, O Lord from Heaven Thy Dwelling Place (1961), was published after Lowry's death. The scholar and poet Earle Birney edited Selected Poems of Malcolm Lowry (1962). Birney also collaborated with Lowry's widow, Margerie Bonner Lowry, conflating several earlier pieces concerned with Lowry's experience at Bellevue Hospital into the novella Lunar Caustic, first published in The Paris Review in 1963, in book form in a French translation the same year (Julliard), and finally in book form in English in 1968 (Jonathan Cape). Using Lowry's manuscripts, Bonner Lowry also completed and edited the novels Dark as the Grave Wherein my Friend Is Laid (1968), assisted by Douglas Day, who later became Lowry's first biographer, and October Ferry to Gabriola (1970).

The Selected Letters of Malcolm Lowry, edited by Bonner Lowry and Harvey Breit, was released in 1965, followed in 1995–96 by the two-volume Sursum Corda! The Collected Letters of Malcolm Lowry, edited by Sherrill E. Grace. Scholarly editions of Lowry's final work in progress, La Mordida ("The Bribe"), and his screen adaptation of F. Scott Fitzgerald's Tender Is the Night have also been published.

Volcano: An Inquiry into the Life and Death of Malcolm Lowry (1976) is an Oscar-nominated National Film Board of Canada documentary directed by Donald Brittain and John Kramer. It opens with the inquest into Lowry's "death by misadventure", and then moves back in time to trace the writer's life. Selections from Lowry's novel are read by Richard Burton amid images shot in Mexico, the United States, Canada and England.

In 2001, Lowry's first wife Jan Gabrial revealed in her memoir that she had an early draft of Lowry's novel In Ballast to the White Sea, which was thought to have been lost. According to Professor Dean Irvine at Dalhousie University, Lowry had given an early copy of the novel to Gabrial's mother before the couple went to Mexico in 1936. Lowry's working copy of the manuscript was then lost in a fire. In October 2014 it was published for the first time by University of Ottawa Press and a launch was held at the Bluecoat Arts Centre in Liverpool.

=== The Voyage That Never Ends ===
Lowry envisioned The Voyage That Never Ends as his magnum opus: an epic cycle encompassing his existing novels and stories as well as projected works, with Under the Volcano as its centrepiece. He spent much of his writing life crafting his body of work into a greater, thematically cohesive whole, which he called The Voyage That Never Ends. It was to rival the epics of other great modernists, and he referred to it in several personal annotations and letters as the concept evolved over many years and works-in-progress. An early typescript has the sequence's contents listed as:

- The Ordeal of Sigbjørn Wilderness I

–

- Untitled Sea Novel
- Lunar Caustic

–

- Under the Volcano

–

- Dark as the Grave Wherein My Friend is Laid
- Eridanus
- La Mordida

–

- The Ordeal of Sigbjørn Wilderness II

Lowry labelled Under the Volcano as "The Centre" while marking Dark as the Grave Wherein My Friend is Laid, Eridanus, and La Mordida as "Trilogy". In addition, Eridanus (the name Lowry gave his West Coast surroundings, referring "to both the stellar constellation and mythical river to which Faeton was cast down by gods") seems to consist of the story collection Hear Us Oh Lord From Heaven Thy Dwelling Place, the poems of The Lighthouse Invites the Storm, and "other tales, poems, a play, etc." As well, The Ordeal of Sigbjørn Wilderness was a novel he planned after spending time in a hospital after breaking his leg in 1949: "His experiences there due to a mixture of alcohol withdrawal and drugs were as traumatic as his time in Bellevue in 1936. As ever Malc turned these experiences into literature which he initially entitled the 'Atomic Rhythm' which eventually became The Ordeal of Sigbjørn Wilderness, which was never developed beyond a rough sketch and remains unpublished." His plans for The Voyage That Never Ends ultimately grew into a 34-page outline that he gave to the editor Albert Erskine, with whom he was friends.

It's hellish near impossible to make a précis of my plan...but I've tried to give you an idea, a frame. I myself can hear – almost – the whole thing; that is to say I can already project myself into a given section, no matter how remote, and feel, hear, sense more or less how it must be. (November 23, 1951)

It was this letter and outline that secured for Lowry a long-term contract with Random House. Lowry's alcoholism and early death, however, prevented him from finishing his grand project. Several of the works intended as part of the sequence were rewritten many times over many years—he worked on Lunar Caustic, for instance, from the 1930s until his death, first titled The Last Address, then Swinging the Maelstrom, and finally Lunar Caustic. The posthumous publications of his unfinished manuscripts have brought several more parts of The Voyage That Never Ends to light, though these vary in completeness and Lowry's final intentions with these works can only be speculated on. The published version of Lunar Caustic, for instance, was compiled by his widow Margerie Lowry and poet Earle Birney from "two distinctly different manuscripts. One bore the first title and was last worked on in 1942–44, while the other had the second name and was last edited by the (at the time living) dead author in 1951–52."

In the intervening years, the story had undergone vast changes in style and thematic emphasis. A scholarly edition was eventually published in 2013 that includes the three major versions with annotation on the history of the text's composition. When the novel In Ballast to the White Sea was finally published in 2014—after being thought lost for decades—it represented only an early draft of the 1000 page manuscript that had been destroyed in the same shack fire that nearly destroyed Under the Volcano, and as such does not represent the more complete text Lowry had been working on for nine years. La Mordida was inspired by Lowry's deportation from Mexico in the mid-1940s. "The central narrative of La Mordida involves a descent into the abyss of self, culminating in the protagonist's symbolic rebirth at the book's end. Lowry planned to use this basic narrative pattern as the springboard for innumerable questions about such concerns as art, identity, the nature of existence, political issues, and alcoholism.

Above all, La Mordida was to have been a metafictional work about an author who sees no point in living events if he cannot write about them and who is not only unable to write but suspects that he is just a character in a novel." It was published in 1996 as notes, sketches, outlines, and rough chapters—it was to feature the autobiographical character Sigbjørn Wilderness. Dark as the Grave Wherein My Friend is Laid was published only twelve years after Lowry's death, and also featured Sigbjørn Wilderness. It was "collated from a huge volume of notes ... almost every chapter exist[ing] in three or four different forms."

Because so much of The Voyage That Never Ends was left incomplete (much of it hardly begun, barely going beyond his initial conceptual framework) what exists only hints at the final form Lowry intended for his magnum opus.

== Works ==
=== Works published in Lowry's lifetime ===
- Ultramarine (1933), novel
- Under the Volcano (1947), novel

=== Posthumous works largely completed by Lowry ===
- Hear Us O Lord from Heaven Thy Dwelling Place (1961), short stories

=== Posthumous works constructed from Lowry's drafts and notes ===
- Selected Poems of Malcolm Lowry (1962), poetry
- Lunar Caustic (1963 in French, 1968 in English), novella
- Dark as the Grave Wherein My Friend Is Laid (1968), novel
- October Ferry to Gabriola (1970), novel
- The Cinema of Malcolm Lowry: A Scholarly Edition of Malcolm Lowry's "Tender is the Night" (1990), screenplay
- The Collected Poetry of Malcolm Lowry (1992), poetry
- The 1940 Under The Volcano (1994), novel
- La Mordida (1996), novel
- Swinging the Maelstrom (2013), novella
- In Ballast to the White Sea (2014), novel
