= Under the Volcano =

1947 novel by Malcolm Lowry

- First edition (US)
- Author: Malcolm Lowry
- Language: English
- Publisher: Reynal & Hitchcock (US); Jonathan Cape (UK)
- Publication date: 1947
- Publication place: United Kingdom
- Media type: Print
- Text: Under the Volcano online

Under the Volcano is a novel by the English writer Malcolm Lowry (1909–1957) published in 1947. It tells the story of Geoffrey Firmin, an alcoholic British consul in the Mexican city of Quauhnahuac on the Day of the Dead in November 1938. It takes its name from the volcanoes Popocatépetl and Iztaccihuatl, which overshadow the city and the characters. It was Lowry's second novel, and the last one he completed.

The novel was adapted for radio on Studio One in 1947 but had gone out of print by the time Lowry died in 1957. In 1984 it served as the basis of the film adaption Under the Volcano, which restored its popularity. In 1998 Modern Library ranked Under the Volcano at number 11 on its list of the 100 best English-language novels of the 20th century. It was included also in Le Monde's 100 Books of the Century, Time's All-Time 100 Novels, and Anthony Burgess' Ninety-Nine Novels: The Best in English Since 1939.

== Genesis and publication history ==
Lowry had already published one novel, Ultramarine (1933), by the time he was working on Under the Volcano, and in 1936 wrote a short story called "Under the Volcano" containing the kernel of the future novel. That story was not published until the 1960s; passages of it are found also in the account of Sigbjorn Wilderness, found in Dark as the Grave Wherein my Friend Is Laid, edited by Margerie Bonner (Lowry's second wife) and published in 1968. It contains what Conrad Aiken would later call "the horse theme," so important in Under the Volcano. The story includes the horse branded with the number seven, the dying Indian encountered while on a bus trip, the pelado who steals the Indian's money to pay his bus fare, and the inability of the spectator (Wilderness in the short story, the Consul in the novel) to act. All this ended up in the novel's eighth chapter.

The first version of the novel was developed while Lowry lived in Mexico, frequently drunk and out of control while his first marriage was breaking up. In 1940, Lowry hired an agent, Harold Matson, to find a publisher for the manuscript but found nothing but rejection—this manuscript is referred to by scholars as the 1940 version, and differs in details of various significance from the published version. Between 1940 and 1944, Lowry revised the novel (with significant editorial assistance from Margerie Bonner), a process which occupied him completely: during those years Lowry, who had been wont to work on many projects at the same time, worked on nothing but the manuscript, a process documented exhaustively by Frederick Asals. One of the most significant changes involved Yvonne's character: In earlier versions she was the Consul's daughter, but, by 1940, she was his unfaithful wife. In that version (and a 1941 revision), chapter 11 ended with her and Hugh making love.

In 1944, the manuscript was nearly lost in a fire at the Lowrys' cabin in Dollarton, British Columbia. Margerie Bonner rescued the unfinished novel, but all of Lowry's other works in progress were lost in the blaze. The burned manuscript was called In Ballast to the White Sea, and would have been the third book in a trilogy made up of Under the Volcano, an expanded version of Lunar Caustic, and In Ballast. Like Dante's Divine Comedy, these were to be infernal, purgatorial, and paradisal, respectively. Asals notes that the important 1944 revision evidences Lowry and Bonner paying extraordinary attention to references to fire in the novel, especially in Yvonne's dream before her death.

The novel was finished in 1945 and immediately sent to different publishers. In late winter, while travelling in Mexico, Lowry learned the novel had been accepted by two publishing companies: Reynal & Hitchcock in the United States and Jonathan Cape in the United Kingdom. Following critical reports from two readers, Cape had reservations about publishing and wrote to Lowry on 29 November 1945 asking him to make drastic revisions, though he added that if Lowry didn't make the revisions "it does not necessarily mean I would say no". Lowry's lengthy reply, dated 2 January 1946, was a passionate defence of the book in which he sensed he had created a work of lasting greatness: "Whether it sells or not seems to me either way a risk. But there is something about the destiny of the creation of the book that seems to tell me it just might go on selling a very long time." The letter includes a detailed summary of the book's key themes and how the author intended each of the 12 chapters to work; in the end, Cape published the novel without further revision.

Under the Volcano and Ultramarine were both out of print by the time Lowry died of alcoholism (and possibly sleeping pills) in 1957, but the novel has since made a comeback. In 1998, it was rated as number 11 on the list of the 100 best novels of the 20th century compiled by the Modern Library. TIME included the novel in its list of "100 best English-language novels from 1923 to the present," calling it a "vertiginous picture of self-destruction, seen through the eyes of a man still lucid enough to report to us all the harrowing particulars."

== Structure and plot ==
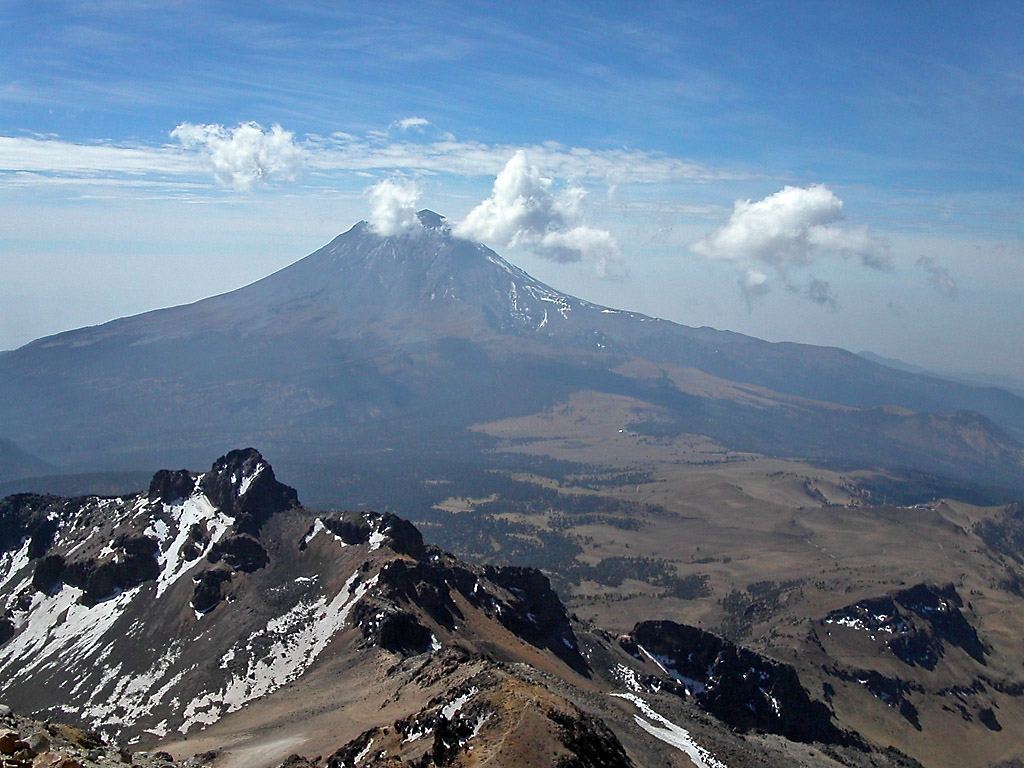
The active volcano Popocatépetl in Mexico, from the summit of the dormant volcano Iztaccihuatl

The book consists of twelve chapters, the first of which introduces the narrative proper and which is set exactly a year after the events. The following eleven chapters happen in a single day and follow the Consul chronologically, starting early on the morning of the Day of the Dead with the return of his wife, Yvonne, who left him the year before, to his violent death at the end of the day. In contrast with the omniscient narrative mode of the 1940 version, the published novel "focus[es] each chapter through the mind of one central figure, no two sequential chapters employing the same character's consciousness."

The number of chapters was important numerologically, as Lowry explained in a letter to Jonathan Cape: there are twelve hours in a day (and most of the novel happens in a single day), twelve months in a year (one year elapses between chapter 1 and the end of chapter 12). Besides, the number 12 is of symbolic importance in the Kabbalah which, according to Lowry, represents "man's spiritual aspirations." Finally, "I have to have my 12," Lowry says, since he hears in it "a clock slowly striking midnight for Faust."

=== Chapter 1 ===
In the first chapter, set on 2 November 1939, Jacques Laruelle and Dr Vigil drink anisette at the Hotel Casino de la Selva, on a hill above Quauhnahuac (an approximation of the Nahuatl name of Cuernavaca), and reminisce on the Consul's presence, exactly a year ago. His alcoholism is discussed and his unhappy marriage; that his wife came back to him is remarked upon as particularly striking. Their conversation over (they are to meet later again that night at a party), Laruelle walks down from the hotel into town through the ruins of a palace of Archduke Maximilian. Along the way he remembers spending a season with the Consul: Laruelle's family and the Consul's adopted family (the Taskersons, consisting of a poetic-minded patriarch and a set of hard-drinking sons) rented adjoining summer homes on the English Channel. Afterward Laruelle spent some time with the Taskersons in England but the friendship soon petered out.

Laruelle is scheduled to leave Quauhnahuac the next day, but has not yet packed and does not want to go home, spending his time instead at the Cervecería XX, a bar connected to the local cinema, run by Sr. Bustamente. At that bar, he is given a book he had borrowed a year and a half before from the Consul—an anthology of Elizabethan plays he had meant to use for a film on the Faustus myth. Playing a variation on Sortes virgilianae, his eyes fall on the closing words of the chorus in Marlowe's Doctor Faustus, "Cut is the branch that might have grown full straight...", then finds a desperate letter by the Consul to Yvonne, a final plea for her to return, interspersed with descriptions of alcoholic stupor and delirium tremens. Laruelle burns the letter. A bell outside sounds dolente, delor symbolising the closing of the chapter.

=== Chapter 2 ===
Chapter 2 finds the Consul sitting at the bar of the Bella Vista hotel in Quauhnahuac at 7:00am on 2 November 1938, drinking whisky the morning after the Red Cross ball, when Yvonne enters. The Consul has not been home yet and isn't wearing any socks (as is explained later, his alcoholism is so advanced he cannot put them on). Yvonne has returned to try and save their marriage, but the Consul appears stuck in the past and begins to talk about his visit to Oaxaca, where he went on a drinking binge after Yvonne left. In interior monologue Yvonne wonders if the Consul will be able to return from "this stupid darkness". The chapter had opened with an exclamation about a child's corpse being transported by train; the Consul explains that in such cases in Mexico the dead child always needs to be accompanied by an adult, leading to a reference to William Blackstone, "the man who went to live among the Indians", a reference the Consul will repeat later on in the day.

Yvonne and the Consul leave the hotel and walk through town, along the Palace of Cortés, Cuernavaca; they stop at a printer's shop window, their attention drawn by a photograph of a boulder split in two by the elements, an image Yvonne immediately recognises as emblematic of her marriage. On the way to their house in the Calle Nicaragua they stop at Jacques Laruelle's "bizarre" house, with the inscription No se puede vivir sin amar ("one cannot live without loving") on the wall, and Popocatépetl and Ixtaccihuatl come into view. The Consul tells Yvonne that Hugh is staying with him as well and is expected back from a trip this very day. As they enter the garden of their house a pariah dog follows them in.

=== Chapter 3 ===
Yvonne inspects the garden, which has fallen into chaos while she was away, and the Consul is making an attempt to keep up the appearance that he is dealing with his drinking problem. Throughout the chapter, hallucinations, memories, and imaginary conversations interrupt his train of thought, and he hears voices that alternately tell him all is lost and that there is still hope. Dr Vigil had prescribed him a strychnine concoction which the Consul sips from continuously, all the while trying to resist the temptation to drink whisky.

While Yvonne is in the bathroom, however, he leaves the house to visit a cantina but falls face down in the street, passes out, and is almost run over by an English driver in an MG Magna who offers him Burke's whisky from a flask. While unconscious, memories of Hugh return to him, particularly his having forced Yvonne on him. Back at the house, he enters Yvonne's bedroom but their conversation is halted, in part by the temptation of the bottle of Johnnie Walker he knows is on the patio and in part by hallucinations. An unsuccessful attempt at making love to her establishes his impotence and his despair; afterward, while Yvonne is crying in her room, he murmurs "I love you" to his bottle of whisky and falls asleep.

=== Chapter 4 ===
Much of the chapter takes Hugh's point of view. Hugh arrives at his brother's home and it's understood that he's not wearing any of his own clothes. Because his clothes have been impounded, he wears his brother's jacket, shirt, and bag. He stores his news dispatch in his brother's jacket. References to the Battle of the Ebro are found throughout the chapter, as are mentions of Hugh's friend Juan Cerillo, a Mexican who was in Spain with Hugh. Hugh sees Yvonne at the Consul's home; it's obvious that she has some hold on his heart. In fact, an affair between the two is alluded to in the chapter. While the Consul is sleeping, Hugh and Yvonne rent horses and ride through the countryside, stopping at a brewery and then at the country estate of Archduke Maximilian, Emperor of Mexico, haunted by the memory of Maximilian and his consort Carlota, and of the Consul and Yvonne in happier times.

=== Chapter 5 ===
While Hugh and Yvonne are out, the Consul endures a "horripilating" hangover. The chapter begins with a vision of a man suffering unquenchable thirst; while the Consul inspects his garden (the Garden of Eden is referenced throughout, and a snake crosses his path) he finds a bottle of tequila he had hidden, and sees a newly placed sign: LE GUSTA ESTE JARDIN? QUE ES SUYO? EVITE QUE SUS HIJOS LO DESTRUYAN! He mistranslates this as "You like this garden? Why is it yours? We evict those who destroy!" As he is getting more drunk he has visions of the Farolito, a bar in Parian. He engages his American neighbour, Mr. Quincey, in conversation. Quincey obviously disdains the drunk Consul, who speaks of the Garden of Eden and proposes that perhaps Adam's punishment was to continue to live in the Garden of Eden, alone, "cut off from God". Vigil (also hungover from the Red Cross ball) visits Quincey; he carries a newspaper with headlines of the Battle of the Ebro and the sickness of Pope Pius XI. He then visits the Consul, telling him to stay away from mescal and tequila. Hugh and Yvonne return, and the Consul wakes up from a black-out in the bathroom, slowly remembering the strained conversation during which it is decided that rather than accept Vigil's offer of a day trip to Guanajuato they will go to Tomalin, near Parian.

=== Chapter 6 ===
Hugh ruminates upon his career as sailor, journalist, and musician, while smoking a cigar. He imagines himself to be a traitor to his "journalist friends", somehow responsible for the Ebro, and comparable to Adolf Hitler as "another frustrated artist" and anti-semite. It is revealed that Hugh's signing aboard the S.S. Philoctetes was intended as a publicity stunt to promote his songs, which are to be printed by a Jewish publisher named Bolowski. Doubting his choice, Hugh attempts to escape his journey to sea but is thwarted by the Consul, who wires words of support for Hugh's choice to their aunt. Hugh remembers his time aboard the Philoctetes and, later, the Oedipus Tyrannus, revealing his naivete and bigotry. Back in England, Hugh finds that Bolowski has made "No effort [...] to distribute [Hugh's songs]".

It is further revealed that Hugh cuckolds Bolowski, who raises charges of plagiarism against Hugh. Later, Bolowski drops the charges. Once again in the present, Hugh shaves the Consul, who is suffering from delirium tremens. The two men discuss literature and the occult; their discussion is intermingled with Hugh's ongoing inner monologue. At the end of the chapter, Hugh, Yvonne, the Consul and Laruelle make their way to Laruelle's home. On the way, the Consul receives a postcard from Yvonne, which she wrote the year before, days after she left him, and which has travelled around the world before reaching Quauhnahuac.

=== Chapter 7 ===
The four arrive at Jacques Laruelle's home, which features two towers that the Consul compares to both Gothic battlements and the camouflaged smokestacks of the Samaritan. Hugh, Yvonne, and the Consul go upstairs, where the Consul simultaneously struggles to resist drinking and look for his copy of Eight Famous Elizabethan Plays. Yvonne wants to leave from the start, and she soon suggests going to the fiesta before they board the bus to Tomalin. The Consul stays behind as Hugh and Yvonne leave; once the two are gone, Laruelle rounds on him for coming only to drink. The Consul can no longer resist, and does so while Laruelle changes into his tennis clothes for a match with Vigil. They accompany each other down to the fiesta, where the Consul gets himself drunk at a cafe called the Paris while Laruelle tries to lecture him on his drinking. At the fiesta, more mention is made of the Pope's illness and the Battle of the Ebro.

Eventually Laruelle leaves, although the Consul is not sure when; he ends up lecturing himself on his drinking problem. Now wandering around to avoid Hugh and Yvonne, he finds an unoccupied ride called the Infernal Machine and is pressured by a gang of children to take the ride. He loses all of his possessions on the ride, which the children gather and return to him. The Consul still has more time to waste, so he stumbles into the Terminal Cantina El Bosque, wherein he chats with the proprietor, Senora Gregorio, and has at least two more drinks. The pariah dog follows him inside but is scared off when he rises. Finally, he walks back outside to find Vigil, Quincey, and Bustamente walking together—they do not notice him—just as the bus to Tomalin pulls into the station.

=== Chapter 8 ===
The Consul, Hugh, and Yvonne travel to Tomalin by bus. A number of allusions and symbols are repeated: Las Manos de Orlac, the battle of the Ebro, cigarettes, the Good Samaritan, the number seven, etc. Along the way, Hugh notices a dead dog at the bottom of the barranca (Spanish for "canyon" or "ravine"). During the trip, a pelado on the bus is noted, and Hugh and the Consul debate the meaning of the epithet. Hugh believes the term to mean "a shoeless illiterate" but the Consul corrects him, claiming that pelados are "indeed 'peeled ones', the stripped, but also those who did not have to be rich to prey on the really poor."

Further along, Hugh spots a man by the road, seemingly asleep. The bus stops and the man is found to be an Indian dying with his hat covering his face. No one helps the man due to a law that makes any such Samaritan liable for "accessory after the fact". However, the pelado removes the Indian's hat, revealing a head wound and bloodied money. Nearby, Hugh and the Consul spot the recurring horse: "branded number seven". Leaving the peasant to his fate, the passengers reboard the bus. The Consul directs Hugh to look at the pelado, who is now clutching the "bloodstained pile of silver pesos and centavos": the pelado has pilfered the Indian's money, and has used it to pay his fare. The Consul, Hugh, and Yvonne take a pinch of habanero, and the bus rattles on toward Tomalin, where it arrives at the end of the chapter.

=== Chapter 9 ===
The Consul, Hugh, and Yvonne arrive at Arena Tomalin and take in a bullfight. The narrative references Munro Leaf's Ferdinand the Bull, as the bull does not care to participate in the occasion for much of the event. This chapter offers Yvonne's point of view, including her memories of the Indian that had been injured and the emotion that she feels when reflecting on the volcano, Popocatépetl. As the chapter continues, she reminisces about her childhood and early adulthood in multiple instances; for example, when she claimed to see her father come toward her in a hallucination, when she thinks about her mother's death around the time of World War I, and when she discusses her life as an actress in Hollywood. Also, Yvonne dreams of the future she could have had, and would still like to have, with the Consul. Yvonne's futuristic dreams included living with the Consul in solidarity and peace with nature. During the bullfight, Hugh decides to jump in and ride the bull while the Consul and Yvonne profess their love for each other in the crowd.

=== Chapter 10 ===
Told from the Consul's perspective, Chapter 10 opens with Geoffrey having drinks at the Salon Ofelia. He sits at the bar contemplating varieties of liquor while listening to Hugh and Yvonne banter as they swim nearby. They dress in separate changing rooms as the Consul continues to listen to their playful repartee, and they soon join him for dinner. Various landmarks, including the San Francisco Convent, the City Parish and the Tlaxcala Royal Chapel and Sanctuary, are mentioned as the Consul reads a tourist information booklet and remembers places he and Yvonne visited in happier times of their past. The Consul leaves early after arguing politics with Hugh and lashing out against Hugh and Yvonne's concerns about his drinking.

=== Chapter 11 ===
Hugh and Yvonne leave Salon Ofelia in search of the Consul. They walk in the shadow of the two volcanoes, Popocatépetl and Ixtaccihuatl, and come to a point where they must choose one of two paths. Told from Yvonne's perspective, they choose the main path, which they believe the Consul would have taken, since it passes by two cantinas on the way to Parian. Their progress is hindered by a growing thunderstorm and there are numerous references to constellations, such as Orion and the Pleiades. Yvonne is trampled by the horse with the number 7 branded on its leg and imagines seeing her dream house in Canada burn down as she dies.

=== Chapter 12 ===
The final chapter of Under the Volcano is told again from the Consul's point of view. And simultaneous to Yvonne's previous chapter 11. The final two chapters occur simultaneously. He is in the main barroom of the Farolito, which is located at the foot of and seemingly under the volcano Popocatépetl. He does not realise that Hugh and Yvonne are looking for him. Diosdado, also called The Elephant, hands the Consul a stack of letters he has had, which were written by Yvonne and sent to the Consul throughout the past year. The Consul gets into a disagreement with the local police chiefs. They push him outside of the bar and out of the light, where they shoot the Consul and throw him off the edge of the ravine that the Farolito is built atop of. The shot startles the horse that runs off and tramples Yvonne (in the previous chapter).

== Characters ==
=== Main characters ===
- Geoffrey Firmin is the alcoholic Consul living in Quauhnahuac. The Consul was born in India, and his mother died when he was young. His father remarried but walked away from his wife, his son Geoffrey, and his newly born son Hugh, disappearing into the Himalayas. The stepmother dies soon afterward, and the Firmin boys are sent to England and taken in by the Taskersons. A naval officer during World War I, Firmin was court-martialed and subsequently decorated for his actions aboard a submarine destroyer disguised as a merchant vessel (the captured German officers disappeared and were allegedly burned alive in the boiler). His appointment to the consular service is a kind of lateral promotion to get him out of the headlines, and he ends up with the sinecure of a consular position in a Mexican town with no British interests. By the novel's start he is actually an ex-consul: he resigned the service at the time when the UK and Mexico broke up diplomatic relationships in the aftermath of President Lázaro Cárdenas's 1938 nationalisation of the country's oil reserves. He wants to write a book on comparative mythology, but his alcoholism dominates all areas of his life.
- Yvonne Constable is a former actress, born in Hawaii, who at age 14 began a brief career in the movies, which she abandoned and never picked up again. She has returned to Mexico, after a long absence in the United States, to rekindle her marriage to the Consul. She was married before and had a child, who died young; she may have had affairs with Hugh Firmin and Jacques Laruelle.
- Hugh Firmin who had interrupted his career as a singer-songwriter in England for a year at sea, is Geoffrey's half-brother and a child-prodigy like Yvonne. After returning to England, he falls in with the political left and supports the Republicans in the Spanish Civil War. He visits Mexico to report on fascist activity for the London Globe, and is to leave the next day, to board a ship bringing ammunition to the Spanish government forces. There are frequent allusions in later chapters to an earlier affair between Hugh and Yvonne.
- Jacques Laruelle (usually referred to as "M. Laruelle"), a French film director and childhood friend of the Consul. Born in the Moselle area, he grew up in Paris and became acquainted with the Consul during the summer of 1911 in the beach resort of Courseulles-sur-Mer, on the Channel. Independently of the Consul he has also moved to Quauhnahuac, and like Hugh has an affair with Yvonne. He is 42 when the novel starts and is preparing to leave Mexico.

=== Secondary characters ===
- Dr. Arturo Díaz Vigil, a local physician, friend of the Consul and Laruelle.
- Sr. Bustamente, owner of the local cinema.
- Señora Gregorio, owner of the Terminal Cantina El Bosque, a bar in Quauhnahuac.
- The Taskersons, the Consul's adoptive family; the patriarch, a poet named Abraham Taskerson, took Geoffrey in as a fifteen-year-old brooding poet. The entire family, including the mother and at least six sons, drinks hard and takes long walks in the countryside around their home, across the River Mersey and with a view of the Welsh mountains.
- Juan Cerillo, a Mexican national who was in Spain with Hugh and is now an agent for a cooperative holding made possible by the nationalisations of president Lázaro Cárdenas: he transports money between rural cooperatives and farmers and the national Credit Bank (much like the murdered Indian in Chapter VII). Cerillo is modelled on a real-life friend of Lowry's, Juan Fernando Márquez, whom he befriended during his 1936–1938 stay in Mexico and who also appears in Dark as the Grave Wherein my Friend is Laid.

== Symbolism and allusion ==
Under the Volcano is particularly rich in symbolism; references and allusions to other writers and literary works abound. The influence of Christopher Marlowe's Doctor Faustus runs throughout the novel, and references to Charles Baudelaire's Les Fleurs du mal, William Shakespeare's tragedies, and Dante's Divine Comedy enrich the novel's meaning.

=== Marlowe and Doctor Faustus ===
Critics have remarked that Marlowe's version of the Faustus myth is "Lowry's single most important source for Under the Volcano". Lowry alludes to Goethe's Faust as well and uses a quote for one of his three epigraphs but Marlowe's dominates, with the Consul being suggested as a Faustian black magician by Hugh. The Consul "often associates himself with Faustus as a suffering soul who cannot ask for salvation, or who even runs toward hell", and parodies Marlowe's line about Helen of Troy ("was this the face that launched a thousand ships, / and burnt the topless towers of Illium?") when looking at a fighting cock in a bar, "Was this the face that launched five hundred ships, and betrayed Christ into being in the Western Hemisphere?"

A literary game based on the Sortes virgilianae—a form of divination by bibliomancy in which advice or predictions of the future are sought by randomly selecting a passage from Virgil's Aeneid, but with Shakespeare replacing Virgil—is an important theme. The Consul (who "had delighted in the absurd game") refers to it again in chapter 7, this time using Jean Cocteau's The Infernal Machine. Exactly a year later Laruelle plays it yet again, this time with the Consul's copy of Eight Famous Elizabethan Plays. After two lines and then another from Doctor Faustus and a passage from Thomas Dekker's The Shoemaker's Holiday, the book opens on the last page of Doctor Faustus, and the four lines Laruelle reads are particularly appropriate to the Consul: "Cut is the branch that might have grown full straight, ... Faustus is gone: regard his hellish fall."

=== Others ===
Many of the individual symbols in the novel relate to each other and to Lowry's literary models. The Consul's wild and overgrown garden, which stands for his life, alludes to the Garden of Eden; the barranca symbolises and becomes his tomb. Throughout the novel the number 7 appears –branded on the horse which is encountered in many of the chapters, and often as time: Laruelle's Day of the Dead, in the first chapter, ends at 7 p.m.; Yvonne returns to the Consul at 7 a.m.. and the day which takes up chapters 2 through 12 ends at 7 p.m. At the novel's close, the clock strikes seven times and a cock apparently confirms the Indian belief that "a cock crowing seven times announces death", while the clock also announces the opening of the seventh seal.

== Literary significance and critical reception ==
An early review of the book, by R. W. Flint in The Kenyon Review, called it "one of the most readable novels to appear since the war" but ultimately criticised it severely for its "second-handedness", saying that Lowry "lacks the confidence of the innovator".

Poet and novelist Charles Bukowski said that, when he read Lowry's novel, "I yawned myself to shit". He criticised it for lack of pace, quickness, life, sunlight, juice and flavour in his lines.

Michael Hofmann, who would edit the collection of posthumous work of Lowry's The Voyage That Never Ends, wrote, "Under the Volcano eats light like a black hole. It is a work of such gravity and connectedness and spectroscopic richness that it is more world than product. It is absolute mass, agglomeration of consciousness and experience and terrific personal grace. It has planetary swagger."

In The New York Review of Books, critic Michael Wood wrote, "Under the Volcano is a great book about missing grandeur, about the specialised tragedy that lies in the unavailability of the tragedy you want."

Chris Power, writing in The Guardian, said: "I came to the book knowing only its reputation as a masterpiece of English modernism. I left thinking it one of the greatest novels of the 20th century... Lowry is closer to Melville and Conrad than Joyce, but he creates his corner of Mexico in a manner similar to the Dublin of Ulysses: not by describing it so much as by building an alternate reality from language."

Novelist Elizabeth Lowry (no relation), writing in the London Review of Books, described it as a "black masterpiece about the horrors of alcoholic disintegration."

Reviewing Gordon Bowker's biography of Lowry, The New York Times commented on Volcano's legacy: "Under the Volcano is too famous to be just a cult object, but more than most great novels it is revisited year after year by a few zealous defenders, who place Lowry high up in the modernist pantheon, while the rest of the world is only barely aware of his masterpiece as an exotic and harrowing read."

Modern Library's 100 Best Novels of English novels in the 20th century lists the book at position 11. It was ranked number 99 on Le Monde's 100 Books of the Century.

== In other media ==
John Huston directed the 1984 film adaptation, with Albert Finney, Jacqueline Bisset, Anthony Andrews and Katy Jurado. It received Academy Award nominations for Best Actor in a Leading Role (Albert Finney) and Best Music, Original Score.

Volcano: An Inquiry into the Life and Death of Malcolm Lowry
- 1976: Volcano: An Inquiry Into the Life and Death of Malcolm Lowry – National Film Board of Canada.

Volcano: An Inquiry Into the Life and Death of Malcolm Lowry (1976) is a National Film Board of Canada documentary produced by Donald Brittain and Robert A. Duncan and directed by Brittain and John Kramer. It opens with the inquest into Lowry's "death by misadventure," and then moves back in time to trace the writer's life. Selections from Lowry's novel are read by Richard Burton amid images shot in Mexico, the United States, Canada and England.

The novel was the inspiration for the 1971 song "The Consul at Sunset" by Jack Bruce and Pete Brown, as well as the 1987 song "Back Room of the Bar" by The Young Fresh Fellows. It is also referenced by name in the third verse of Loudon Wainwright III's alcoholic satire "Wine with Dinner," the 6th track on T Shirt (album), from 1976.

== See also ==
- Le Monde's 100 Books of the Century
