= Secret Orders =

1926 film

- Directed by: Chester Withey
- Written by: J. Grubb Alexander; Martin Justice
- Starring: Harold Goodwin; Robert Frazer; Evelyn Brent
- Cinematography: Roy H. Klaffki
- Production company: Robertson-Cole Pictures Corporation
- Distributed by: Film Booking Offices of America (US); Butcher's Film Service (UK)
- Release date: March 7, 1926
- Running time: 60 minutes
- Country: United States
- Language: Silent (English intertitles)

Secret Orders is a lost 1926 American silent drama film directed by Chester Withey and starring Harold Goodwin, Robert Frazer, and Evelyn Brent. The film was set in World War I and contained what the Chester Times described as a "world of swift-flowing melodrama.

== Plot ==
As described in a film magazine review, Janet Graham is cajoled into marrying Delano, who is a crook. During the War she obtains a position as a Secret Service agent under Bruce Corbin, in charge of scheduling transports. They fall in love. Delano is hired by the Germans and directed to obtain a list of transports sailing to Europe from Corbin's safe. He breaks in and forces Janet to accompany him. She warns a transport by radio to beware of a Hun submarine, which is then discovered and sunk. Corbin and guards rescue her and Delano is killed. Corbin and Janet wed.

== Cast ==
- Harold Goodwin as Eddie Delano
- Robert Frazer as Bruce Corbin
- Evelyn Brent as Janet Graaham
- John Gough as Spike Slavin
- Margerie Bonner as Mary, Janet's friend
- Brandon Hurst as Butler
- Frank Leigh as Cook

== Bibliography ==
- Lynn Kear & James King. Evelyn Brent: The Life and Films of Hollywood's Lady Crook. McFarland, 2009.
