= In Ballast to the White Sea =

In Ballast to the White Sea was an unpublished novel by Malcolm Lowry, his second, which was lost in a fire which consumed his house in 1944. By that time the manuscript consisted of 1,000 pages which had taken him nine years to write.

It was thought lost, but an early copy of the manuscript had been kept, safely and secretly, by Lowry's first wife Jan Gabrial. In 2000, Gabrial revealed that her family had long had an early copy of the manuscript, and after she died it was given to the New York Public Library. The University of Ottawa Press published a scholarly edition, with biographical notes and annotations, in 2014.

== See also ==
- Lost works
