= The Ancient Highway =

1925 film

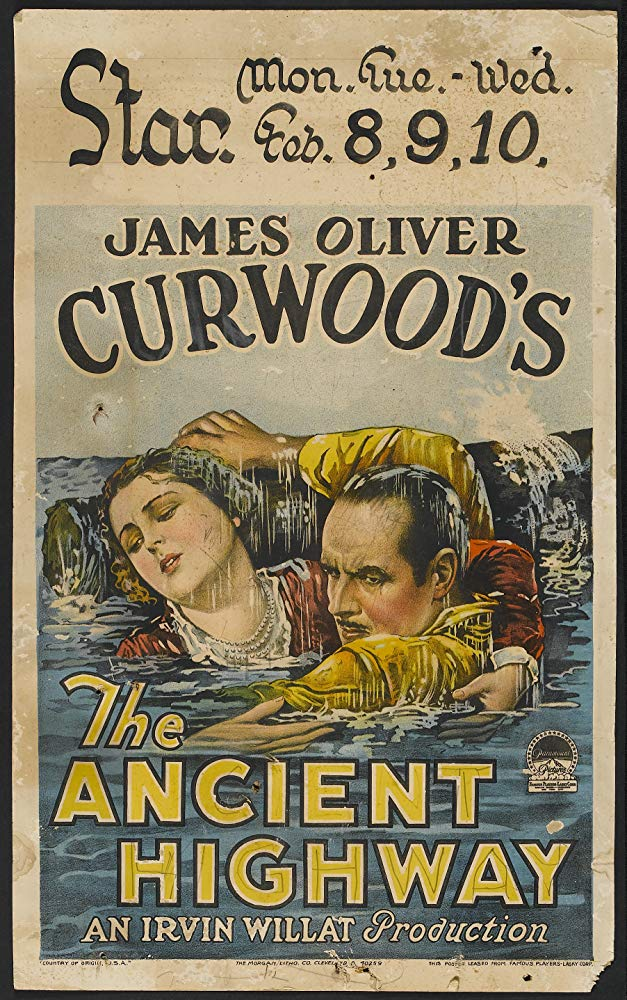
- Film poster
- Directed by: Irvin Willat
- Screenplay by: James Shelley Hamilton; Eve Unsell
- Based on: The Ancient Highway by James Oliver Curwood
- Produced by: Jesse L. Lasky; Adolph Zukor
- Starring: Jack Holt; Billie Dove; Montagu Love; Stanley Taylor; Lloyd Whitlock; William A. Carroll
- Cinematography: Alfred Gilks
- Production company: Famous Players–Lasky Corporation
- Distributed by: Paramount Pictures
- Release date: November 8, 1925
- Running time: 70 minutes
- Country: United States
- Language: Silent (English intertitles)

The Ancient Highway is a 1925 American silent adventure film directed by Irvin Willat and written by James Shelley Hamilton and Eve Unsell based upon the novel of the same name by James Oliver Curwood. The film stars Jack Holt, Billie Dove, Montagu Love, Stanley Taylor, Lloyd Whitlock, and William A. Carroll. The film was released on November 8, 1925, by Paramount Pictures.

== Plot ==
As described in a film magazine reviews, Cliff Brant wanders the world but eventually returns to Canada to avenge the death of his father, which was caused by Ivan Hurd. He beats Hurd almost to death. The fight is witnessed by Antoinette St. Ives, owner of a paper company that is a competitor of Hurd's. Hurd loves Antoinette also, and tries to ruin her company to force her to accept him. Antoinette warns Brant that Hurd has reported him to the police and he takes to “The Ancient Highway,” a famous stream in Quebec. He rescues Antoinette's brother from a crowd of ruffians and takes him home. The lad introduces Brant to Antoinette and he falls in love with her. He declares his love but she is repulsed by his primitive tactics though she loves him. Hurd plots the ruin of Antoinette's company once more and tries to jam the logs going to her mill. Brant prevents this and establishes himself solidly with the young woman. A frenzied monk kills Hurd.

== Cast ==
- Jack Holt as Cliff Brant
- Billie Dove as Antoinette St. Ives
- Montagu Love as Ivan Hurd
- Stanley Taylor as Gaspard St. Ives
- Lloyd Whitlock as John Denis
- William A. Carroll as Ambrose
- Marjorie Bonner as Angel Fanchon
- Christian J. Frank as George Bolden

== Fatality while filming on location in Oregon ==
Environmental journalists Paul Koberstein and Jessica Applegate in Canopy of Titans (2023) report that while filming a scene on the Coos River in Oregon, a Splash dam was operating upstream. Historian Lionel Youst provided this account of the incident in his book Lost in Coos (2019):

A stunt man named Renald D. Jones, doubling for star Tim Holt, was in a canoe below the Sugarloaf Dam. The scene called for him to be paddling ahead of a rush of water and logs. When the dam was opened, the wall of water immediately capsized the canoe and Jones was drowned in sight of hundreds of spectators. Filming stopped, the search was on, and his body was found the next day.

== Preservation ==
The Ancient Highway is presumed to be a lost film.

== Sources ==
- Koberstein, Paul and Applegate, Jessica. 2023. Canopy of Titans: The Life and Times of the Great North American Temperate Rainforest. OR Books, New York, London. ISBN 978-1-68219-345-7 (paperback).
- Youst, Lionel. 2019. Lost in Coos: "Heroic Deeds and Thrilling Adventures" of Searches and Rescues on Coos River, Coos County, Oregon 1871 to 2000. Golden Falls Publishing, Allegheny, Oregon. ISBN 978-0972622639
