= Margerie Bonner =

American actress

- Born: February 17, 1905; Washington, D.C., U.S.
- Died: September 28, 1988 (aged 83); Los Angeles, California, U.S.
- Occupation: Actress
- Relatives: Priscilla Bonner (sister)

Margerie Bonner (February 17, 1905 – September 28, 1988) was an American actress, scriptwriter, and novelist. She is best known as the wife of Malcolm Lowry and for her support of the author while he wrote his best known novel, Under the Volcano, considered one of the finest novels of the 20th century.

== Biography ==
=== Acting career ===
The younger sister of silent screen star Priscilla Bonner, Bonner moved to Hollywood in the early 1920s. She made her film debut in Reno (1923) and over the next five years she appeared as a leading lady or support in over a dozen films (often spelling her first name Marjorie). She appeared with Priscilla as sisters in Paying the Price (1927). She struggled with the transition to sound pictures and by the late 1930s her movie career was over.

=== Relationship with Malcolm Lowry and writing career ===
In the 1930s she began writing scripts for radio and also worked on animated films for Walt Disney. By 1939 she was working as a personal assistant to the actress Penny Singleton.

On June 7, 1939, she met British author Malcolm Lowry on the corner of Hollywood Boulevard and Western Avenue at the time he had begun the second draft of Under the Volcano. They married in 1940 and settled in a beach shack in Dollarton, a small town near Vancouver, British Columbia.

Bonner wrote scripts for CBC Radio and worked with Lowry on a screenplay for the F. Scott Fitzgerald novel Tender Is the Night. She wrote three novels during the 1940s. Two were mystery novels, The Shapes That Creep and The Last Twist of the Knife (both "in the vein of Agatha Christie" and both published by Charles Scribner's Sons in 1946); a third was "a more ambitious novel about human passions, dreams, and failure", Horse in the Sky (1947). A fourth novel, The Castle of Malatesta, was a psychological novel that remained in manuscript.

She is chiefly remembered for her unsung role in the creation of Lowry's masterpiece, Under the Volcano (1947). Not only did she provide the supportive environment her husband needed in order to write, she meticulously edited the novel's manuscript while various passages were rewritten at her suggestion. Since Lowry had a tendency toward verbosity, her most frequent editorial comment was "cut". She is widely “considered to be the model for its central female character, the consul's wife, Yvonne."

==== Lowry's death ====
In 1955 Lowry was persuaded by her to return to Ripe, a small village in Sussex, England, where he died two years later "after a fatal mixture of gin and sodium amytol: the coroner's verdict was 'Death by misadventure.'"

"Foul play at White Cottage", an article by biographer Gordon Bowker published in the Times Literary Supplement on 20 February 2004, outlined inconsistencies in the various different accounts of Lowry's death offered by Margerie.

A 2007 collection of texts by Lowry suggests "he either committed suicide or was in fact murdered by his wife."

=== Later life ===
After Lowry's death in 1957, Margerie Bonner returned to Los Angeles and co-edited with Douglas Day the unfinished novel Dark as the Grave Wherein My Friend Is Laid in 1968, and edited his Psalms and Songs in 1975.

== Selected filmography ==
- Reno (1923)
- The Four-Footed Ranger (1923)
- Daughters of Today (1924)
- Broadway Lady (1925)
- High and Handsome (1925)
- The Ancient Highway (1925)
- Riding Romance (1925)
- Secret Orders (1926)
- Rapid Fire Romance (1926)
- Paying the Price (1927)
- Trail of Courage (1928)
- Sinner's Parade (1928)
- The Film Parade (1933)
- Cleopatra (1934)

== Works ==
- The Shapes That Creep, Scribner's, 1946
- The Last Twist of the Knife, Scribner's, 1946
- Horse in the Sky, Scribner's, 1947

== Bibliography ==
- Lynn Kear & James King. Evelyn Brent: The Life and Films of Hollywood's Lady Crook. McFarland, 2009.
