= Dollarton, North Vancouver =

Suburb of North Vancouver, British Columbia, Canada

Coordinates: 49°19′0″N 122°57′0″W

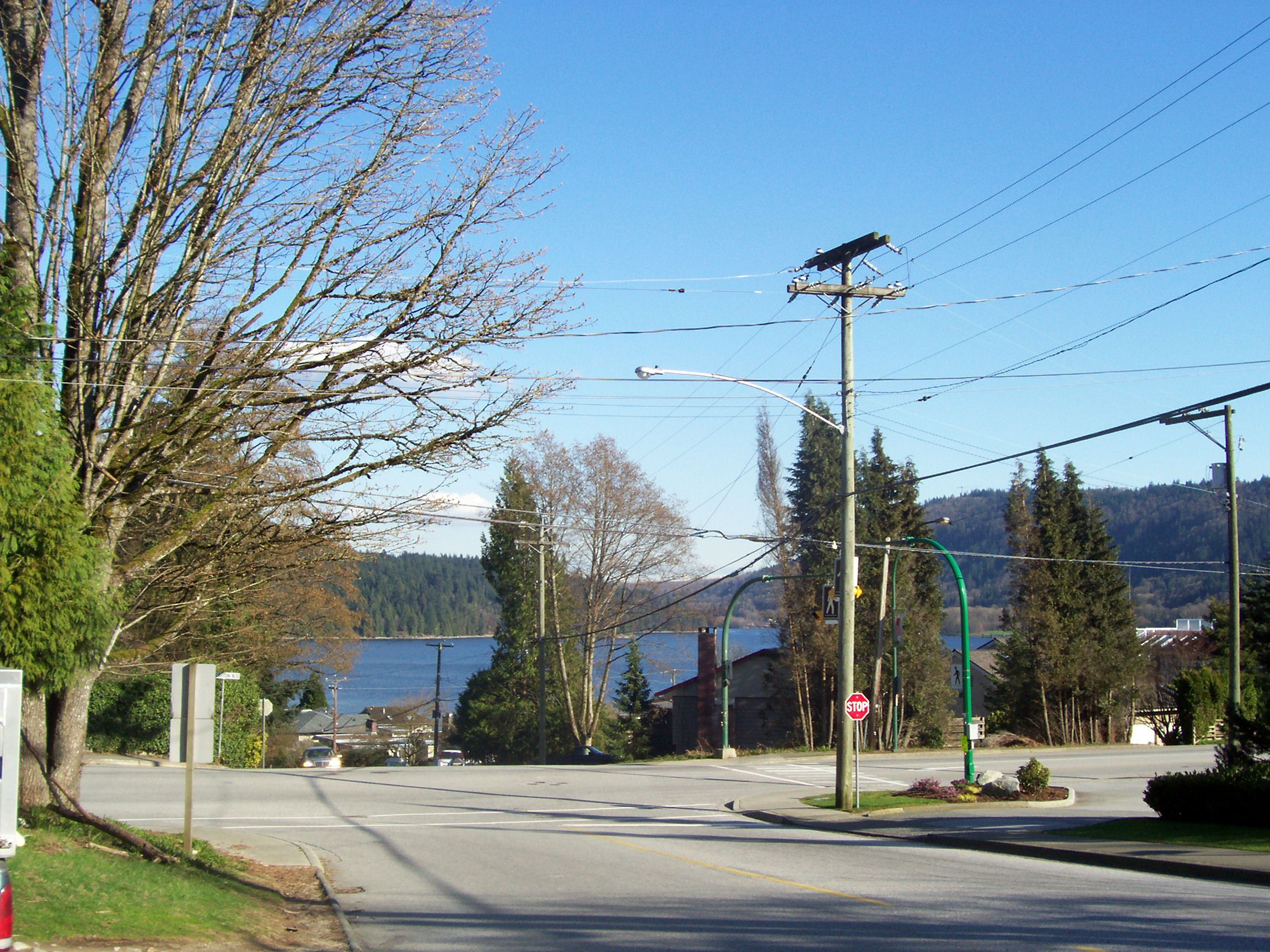
Dollarton Highway in Dollarton

Dollarton is a neighborhood in the municipal district of North Vancouver, British Columbia, Canada. It was founded in 1916 as the site of a sawmill and a village for sawmill workers by Robert Dollar, a San Francisco businessman. Already at this time Dollarton was part of the District Municipality of North Vancouver. In 1917 The Deep Cove Lumber Company began logging the east side of Mount Seymour supplying logs to local mills. In 1918 a road connection was provided to connect it to the rest of the municipality and the more recently created City of North Vancouver. This road was likely an extension of Keith Road which stretched from Horseshoe Bay to Deep Cove. A later road connection known as the Dollarton Highway was completed in 1931. In 1936 Mount Seymour Park was established. In 1942 the Dollarton sawmill was closed. Since that time Dollarton and the surrounding area has developed as a residential and recreational area. In 1948 a road was built up Mount Seymour to develop a ski area. Sometime between 1955 and 1958 a large municipal park, Cates Park, was established in South Dollarton on Burrard Inlet. Since the closure of the sawmill the area to become Cates Park had developed into a desirable squatter community consisting of reasonably well build cabins. Upon creation of the Cates Park the residents were evicted. Native communities who had a village in the area are also reclaiming some ownership over the land beyond the designated Indian Reserves further west along the shore of Burrard Inlet. Besides developing as a residential area, Dollarton, along with Mount Seymour and the adjoining Neighborhood of Deep Cove offer recreational opportunities for people from all over the Vancouver Lower Mainland. The area is generally referred to as Deep Cove by non-residents.

== Notable residents ==
Author Malcolm Lowry and his wife Margerie lived in a series of shacks in the Cates Park area in the 1940s, where they finished the third and fourth drafts of Under the Volcano. His presence in the Dollarton area's history was celebrated in the annual "Under the Volcano" music and poetry festival, named after his most famous novel. It was held in Cates Park, on the shores of Burrard Inlet, where there is also a monument in his memory.
